= The Legend of Tennessee Moltisanti =

- The Sopranos episode
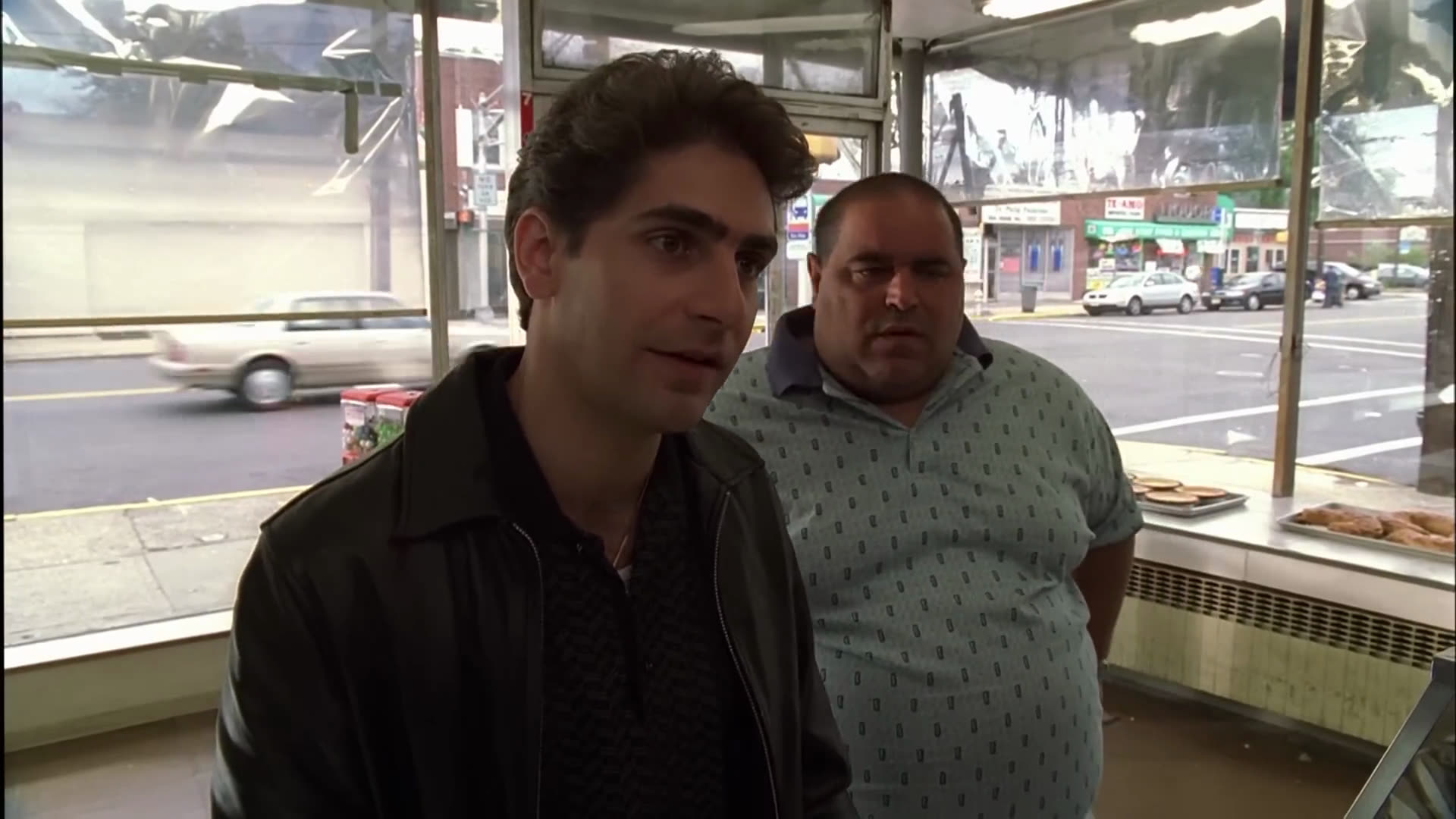
- Christopher Moltisanti making a scene in the bakery
- Episode no.: Season 1 Episode 8
- Directed by: Tim Van Patten
- Written by: David Chase; Frank Renzulli
- Cinematography by: Phil Abraham
- Production code: 108
- Original air date: February 28, 1999
- Running time: 49 minutes

Episode chronology
← Previous "Down Neck"	Next → "Boca"
- The Sopranos season 1

"The Legend of Tennessee Moltisanti" is the eighth episode of the HBO original series The Sopranos. It was written by David Chase and Frank Renzulli, directed by Tim Van Patten and originally aired on February 28, 1999.

== Starring ==
- James Gandolfini as Tony Soprano
- Lorraine Bracco as Dr. Jennifer Melfi
- Edie Falco as Carmela Soprano
- Michael Imperioli as Christopher Moltisanti
- Dominic Chianese as Corrado Soprano, Jr.
- Vincent Pastore as Pussy Bonpensiero
- Steven Van Zandt as Silvio Dante
- Tony Sirico as Paulie Gualtieri
- Robert Iler as Anthony Soprano, Jr.
- Jamie-Lynn Sigler as Meadow Soprano
- Nancy Marchand as Livia Soprano

=== Guest starring ===
- Richard Romanus as Richard LaPenna
- Drea de Matteo as Adriana La Cerva

==== Also guest starring ====
- Al Sapienza as Mikey Palmice
- Tony Darrow as Larry Boy Barese
- George Loros as Raymond Curto
- Joe Badalucco Jr. as Jimmy Altieri
- Frank Santorelli as Georgie
- Sam Coppola as Dr. Sam Reis
- Brian Geraghty as Counter Boy
- Will McCormack as Jason LaPenna
- Ed Crasnick as Comedian
- Joseph Gannascoli as Gino (credited as Bakery Customer)
- Barbara Hass as Aida Melfi
- Bill Richardone as Joseph Melfi
- Timothy Nolen as Jeffrey Wernick
- Barbara Lavalle as Band Leader
- Robert Anthony Lavalle as Band Leader #2
- Frank Pando as Agent Grasso
- Annika Pergament as News Anchor
- Brooke Marie Procida as Bride
- Matt Servitto as Agent Harris
- Bruce Smolanoff as Emil Kolar

== Synopsis ==
At his daughter's wedding, Larry Boy tells Tony and his crew that, according to his source in the FBI, federal indictments will soon be handed down against the DiMeo crime family. One by one the capos gather their families, say goodbye to the tearful bride, and leave the ceremony early. Tony and Carmela swiftly collect cash and guns from different parts of their house while Meadow and A.J. watch. Tony hides everything, without her knowledge, in Livia's room at the Green Grove retirement community. The Soprano residence is searched by an FBI team led by Agent Dwight Harris.

Having dinner after the search, Tony explains to his children that Italians and Italian-Americans are not given the respect they deserve. Dr. Melfi, at a dinner with her own family, says a few careless words which allow her ex-husband to deduce that one of her patients is a mobster. He urges her to drop that patient, deploring the way a few thousand gangsters have tarnished the good name of millions of Italian-Americans. Anticipating arrest, Tony has told Dr. Melfi he might go on vacation and miss a session without notice; she understands what he means. He misses one as a result of the FBI raid, and the next time they meet, she tells him that, as previously agreed, she will still charge him. Tony angrily scatters dollar bills on the floor and leaves.

In nightmares, Christopher is haunted by Emil Kolar. He enlists Georgie to help dig up and relocate Emil's body. At the same time, Christopher is struggling to write a Mafia screenplay; he states that the characters have no arc and feels there is no arc in his own life. In a bakery, he shoots a clerk in the foot for making him wait too long.

Tony is initially furious but calms down and shows some sympathy for his feelings.

Christopher is resentful that he is not listed as one of those being investigated by the FBI. When his name finally appears in the newspaper, he is thrilled.

Livia divulges to Uncle Junior that Tony is seeing a psychiatrist, adding, "I don't want there to be any repercussions."

== First appearances ==
- Agent Grasso: an agent investigating the DiMeo crime family
- Agent Harris: an agent who specializes in the case of the DiMeo crime family
- Jason LaPenna: Dr. Melfi's college-age son
- Richard LaPenna: Dr. Melfi's ex-husband
- Jimmy Petrille: capo in the Lupertazzi crime family.
- Angie Bonpensiero: Pussy's wife of 24 years who is considered a "mob wife" and is good friends with Carmela Soprano, Gabriella Dante and Rosalie Aprile.
- Gino: Gino is seen in the bakery when Christopher shoots the baker in the foot; he is played by Joseph R. Gannascoli, who will later take on the role of "Vito Spatafore" in season 2 of the series.

== Title reference ==
- The title is a play on Christopher Moltisanti's name and that of noted 20th-century American playwright and sufferer of depression Tennessee Williams. Adriana calls Christopher her "Tennessee William" [sic] when he struggles with his screenplay.

== Production ==
- Joseph R. Gannascoli, who plays Gino the bakery customer in this episode, returns in season two as Vito Spatafore, a soldier in the Aprile crew. Gannascoli, Saundra Santiago and Dan Grimaldi are the only actors to portray two roles in the series. Santiago portrays twins Jeannie Cusamano and Joan O'Connell. Grimaldi portrays twins Philly and Patsy Parisi.
- The actresses who play Pussy and Silvio's wives in this episode differ from those who play those roles later in the series—neither "wife" in this role has any lines or is credited for her appearance. Pussy's wife from this episode also appears in "Guy Walks into a Psychiatrist's Office...". In season two, the role of Angie Bonpensiero is recast with Toni Kalem and that of Gabriella Dante with Maureen Van Zandt, Steven Van Zandt's real-life wife.
- This is the first episode directed by Tim Van Patten, who would become a regular director on the series.
- This is the first episode to have Phil Abraham as cinematographer.

== Other cultural references ==
- When describing a character with a story arc to Paulie, Christopher mentions Richard Kimble (protagonist of The Fugitive) and Keanu Reeves' character in The Devil's Advocate. Big Pussy later jokes that Noah had an ark.
- A.J. is seen playing the Nintendo 64 game Blast Corps.
- Richard Romanus plays Dr. Melfi's ex-husband, Richard LaPenna, and he tells Dr. Melfi, played by Lorraine Bracco, that American culture is giving Italian-Americans a bad name, citing The Godfather and Goodfellas as examples. Bracco co-starred in Goodfellas, and Romanus co-starred in another Martin Scorsese film, Mean Streets.
- Christopher's explanation of his sense of malaise to Paulie Gualtieri prompts Paulie to share: the writer "with the bullfights blew his head off". Paulie is referring to Ernest Hemingway, who died by suicide. Hemingway wrote both non-fiction and fiction about bullfighting.
- Christopher speaks appreciatively of Blockbuster, a chain of video rental stores, now closed down, save for one location that remains open in Bend, Oregon.
- When Tony explains the importance of Italians to his children, several Italian figures are mentioned: Michelangelo, Antonio Meucci (when A.J. mentions Alexander Graham Bell as the person who invented the telephone), the founder of the Bank of America, Francis Albert, Sacco and Vanzetti, John Cabot (mentioned by Carmela), Mother Cabrini (mentioned by A.J.), and Meadow snidely comments that Lucky Luciano invented the Mafia by organizing the Five Families
- In the 1990 film Goodfellas, Tommy DeVito, played by Joe Pesci, shoots Michael "Spider" Gianco, played by Michael Imperioli (Christopher Moltisanti) in the foot. In this episode, it is Christopher who shoots the bakery clerk in the foot justifying it with: "It happens!".
- There is also a scene in Goodfellas in which main characters Tommy DeVito (Pesci), Jimmy Conway (Robert De Niro) and Henry Hill (Ray Liotta) are forced to dig up and relocate the body of Billy Batts (Frank Vincent) several months after he was killed by Tommy, similar to Christopher relocating the remains of Emil Kolar.

== Music ==
- The song played when Christopher has a nightmare about Adriana and Carmela is "You" by The Aquatones.
- The song played when Larry Boy tells Paulie about the possible indictments is "Wind Beneath My Wings" by Barbara Lavalle.
- The song played when Jimmy tells Christopher about the possible indictments, and Tony, Junior and the other capos discuss the situation is "Turn the Beat Around" also by Barbara Lavalle.
- The song played when the capos pull their families out of the wedding is "Summer Wind" by Robert Anthony Lavalle.
- The song played when Tony hides his guns and cash in Livia's room is "Welcome (Back)" by Land of the Loops. It was previously played in the pilot episode, which was the first-ever song to play on the show.
- The song played when Dr. Melfi is eating dinner with her family is a piano sonata composed by Domenico Scarlatti, Sonata in D minor "Pastorale" K.9.
- The song played when Paulie visits Christopher's apartment is "Summertime" by Booker T. & the MG's.
- The Beatles song "Lucy In the Sky with Diamonds" is mentioned by the comedian in the nursing home scene between Junior and Livia.
- The song played when Christopher steals the newspapers and into the end credits is "Frank Sinatra" by Cake.

== Filming locations ==
Listed in order of first appearance:

- Satriale's Pork Store in Kearny, New Jersey
- Astoria, Queens
- Jersey City, New Jersey
- North Arlington, New Jersey
- West Orange, New Jersey
- Below Interstate 95 in the Meadowlands in Kearny, New Jersey
- Kearny, New Jersey
- West Caldwell, New Jersey
- West Orange, New Jersey

== Reception ==
In a retrospective review, Emily St. James of The A.V. Club was positive. While she opined that the story with Melfi's family "has a tendency to stop the show dead in its tracks" in that "no one watching really cares what Melfi's ex-husband thinks", St. James listed Christopher's conversations with Paulie and Tony among her favorite scenes from the entirety of The Sopranos and argued that "the series shows it has a certain affection for these characters, these scumbags." Alan Sepinwall also praised the scene between Christopher and Paulie as "remarkable [...] as it illustrates the folly of trying to model your life on your favorite movie and TV characters", but wrote that the dialogue in the scenes with Melfi's family about the popular image of Italian-Americans "grows a little didactic at times".
