= I Dream of Jeannie Cusamano =

- The Sopranos episode
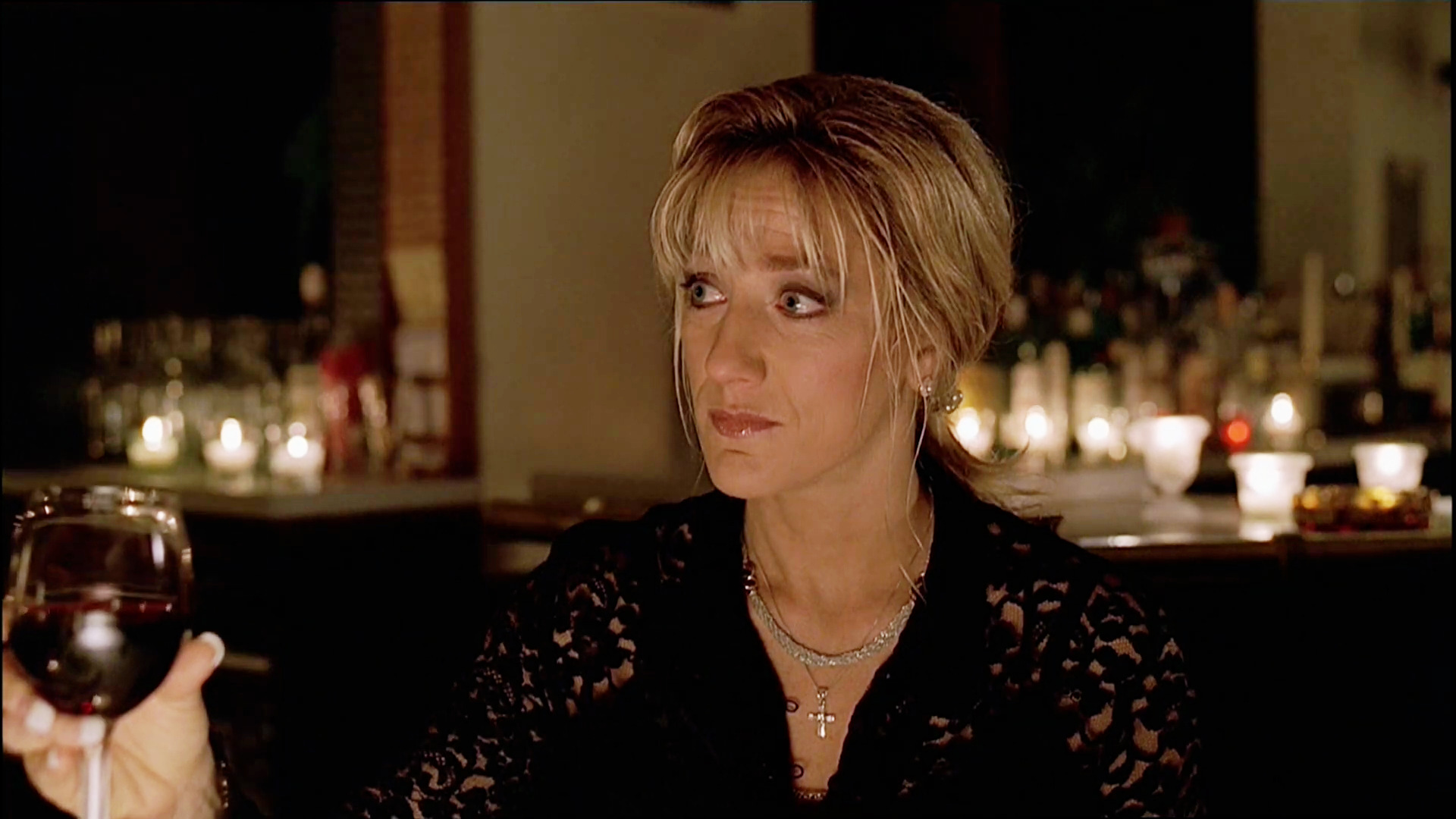
- Carmela Soprano during a candlelight dinner at Artie Bucco's new restaurant
- Episode no.: Season 1 Episode 13
- Directed by: John Patterson
- Written by: David Chase
- Cinematography by: Phil Abraham
- Production code: 113
- Original air date: April 4, 1999
- Running time: 60 minutes

Episode chronology
← Previous "Isabella"	Next → "Guy Walks into a Psychiatrist's Office..."
- The Sopranos season 1

"I Dream of Jeannie Cusamano" is the 13th episode of the HBO original series The Sopranos and the finale of the show's first season. Written by David Chase and directed by John Patterson, it originally aired on April 4, 1999.

== Starring ==
- James Gandolfini as Tony Soprano
- Lorraine Bracco as Jennifer Melfi
- Edie Falco as Carmela Soprano
- Michael Imperioli as Christopher Moltisanti
- Dominic Chianese as Corrado Soprano, Jr.
- Vincent Pastore as Pussy Bonpensiero *
- Steven Van Zandt as Silvio Dante
- Tony Sirico as Paulie Gualtieri
- Robert Iler as Anthony Soprano, Jr.
- Jamie-Lynn Sigler as Meadow Soprano
- Nancy Marchand as Livia Soprano

* = credit only

== Guest starring ==
- John Ventimiglia as Artie Bucco
- Kathrine Narducci as Charmaine Bucco
- Frank Pellegrino as Frank Cubitoso

== Also guest starring ==
- Al Sapienza as Mikey Palmice
- Paul Schulze as Father Phil
- Drea de Matteo as Adriana
- Tony Darrow as Larry Boy Barese
- George Loros as Raymond Curto
- Joe Badalucco, Jr. as Jimmy Altieri
- Sal Ruffino as Chucky Signore
- Sharon Angela as Rosalie Aprile
- John Aprea as U.S. Attorney Gene Conigliaro
- George Bass as Janitor
- Gene Canfield as Police Officer
- Frank Dellarosa as EMT
- Santiago Douglas as Jeremy Herrera
- Militza Ivanova as Russian Woman
- Frank Pando as Agent Grasso
- Annika Pergament as News Anchor
- Michele Santopietro as JoJo Palmice
- Matt Servitto as Agent Harris
- Candy Trabucco as Ms. Giaculo

== Deceased ==
- Jimmy Altieri: Shot in the back of the head by Silvio.
- Chucky Signore: Shot and killed by Tony.
- Mikey Palmice: Shot and killed by Paulie and Christopher.

== Synopsis ==
Jimmy's behavior at a meeting convinces Tony and Uncle Junior that he is an FBI informant. Jimmy is lured into a trap by Christopher and killed by Silvio; his body is dumped in an alley with a dead rat stuffed into his mouth.

Knowing that Tony's life is in danger, Dr. Melfi openly speculates about Livia, noting that she often speaks of infanticide and suggesting that she has borderline personality disorder. Tony angrily rejects this, physically threatens Melfi, and storms out.

Tony is brought to an FBI safehouse where Agent Frank Cubitoso reveals that Livia's room at the Green Grove retirement home has been bugged. He plays audio recordings that confirm Tony's suspicions that the attempt on his life was planned by Uncle Junior, who was goaded by Livia.

Tony returns to Melfi, explaining that the attempted hit occurred partly because he was seeing her, and telling her to leave town. When he next goes to her office, he is told she is on vacation. He confides to his crew that he is seeing a psychiatrist. Though Silvio and Paulie accept it, Christopher cannot and walks out. Tony and his crew then begin to retaliate against Junior's crew, killing Mikey and Chucky. However, Junior and the rest of his crew are then arrested; Tony's lawyer tells him that he was not indicted because the charges relate to a stock fraud scam in which he was not involved. Junior is offered a lesser charge if he confesses that Tony is the de facto boss of the DiMeo crime family, but he refuses.

Carmela sees that Father Phil is now close to Jackie Aprile's widow Rosalie. When he calls on Carmela, knowing that she is alone, she rebuffs him, accusing him of taking advantage of spiritually thirsty women. Crushed, he leaves.

When Artie visits Livia at Green Grove, she divulges Tony's role in burning down his restaurant. Artie then angrily confronts Tony with a rifle, but Tony manages to persuade him that his mother is unreliable and confused. Though still enraged, Artie destroys the rifle and leaves. As time passes, his rebuilt restaurant is a success, and he finds peace.

Tony goes to Green Grove and grabs a pillow, intending to smother his mother. However, Livia has just had a stroke and is wheeled past Tony on a gurney. Discarding the pillow, he leans very close to her face and whispers that he knows what she did. The staff haul him off as he shouts, "Look at her face, she's smiling!"

Later that night, Tony and his family go to Artie's restaurant to wait out a thunderstorm. After a little hesitation, he welcomes them. As they eat by candlelight, Tony raises his glass to "the little moments - like this - that were good".
