= Nobody Knows Anything =

- The Sopranos episode
- Episode no.: Season 1 Episode 11
- Directed by: Henry J. Bronchtein
- Written by: Frank Renzulli
- Cinematography by: Phil Abraham
- Production code: 111
- Original air date: March 21, 1999
- Running time: 49 minutes

Episode chronology
← Previous "A Hit Is a Hit"	Next → "Isabella"
- The Sopranos season 1

"Nobody Knows Anything" is the 11th episode of the HBO original series The Sopranos. Written by Frank Renzulli and directed by Henry J. Bronchtein, it originally aired on March 21, 1999.

== Starring ==
- James Gandolfini as Tony Soprano
- Lorraine Bracco as Dr. Jennifer Melfi
- Edie Falco as Carmela Soprano
- Michael Imperioli as Christopher Moltisanti
- Dominic Chianese as Corrado Soprano, Jr.
- Vincent Pastore as Pussy Bonpensiero
- Steven Van Zandt as Silvio Dante
- Tony Sirico as Paulie Gualtieri
- Robert Iler as Anthony Soprano, Jr.
- Jamie-Lynn Sigler as Meadow Soprano
- Nancy Marchand as Livia Soprano

=== Guest starring ===
- John Heard as Vin Makazian
- Karen Sillas as Debbie

==== Also guest starring ====
- Al Sapienza as Mikey Palmice
- Joseph Badalucco, Jr. as Jimmy Altieri
- Giancarlo "John" Giunta as Kevin Bonpensiero
- George Loros as Raymond Curto
- Sal Ruffino as Chucky Signore
- Doug Barron as Dr. Mop-N-Glo
- Veronica Bero as Girl
- Britt Burr as Traffic Cop
- Johann Carlo as Bonnie DiCaprio
- Ramsey Faragallah as Fed #1
- Annika Pergament as Female Anchor
- Bobby Rivers as Male Anchor
- Michele Santopietro as JoJo Palmice
- Matthew Lawler as Fed #2
- Chance Kelly as Fed #3
- Tim Kirkpatrick as Detective #1
- Peter Bretz as Detective #2

== Synopsis ==
Pussy is at Jimmy Altieri's social club when FBI agents conduct a raid and find a stash of guns. Jimmy and Pussy are both arrested, and Pussy is released on bail soon after. Vin Makazian relays intelligence to Tony that Pussy is an FBI informant. Tony does not want to believe it, but Vin points out how easily Pussy managed to get off after the raid. Tony insists on seeing the official report with Pussy's name on it, but Vin is unable to obtain it.

Due to back pain, Pussy has stopped collecting payments, but Paulie, who sees the same doctor, has been told there is nothing wrong with Pussy's back. Tony consults Dr. Melfi, who explains back pain might be caused by stressful situations such as the burden of a secret. Tony tells Paulie not to act until Pussy's wire is seen, so Paulie insists that Pussy go to a bathhouse with him; Pussy refuses to undress, saying that his doctor told him that heat is bad for him. Silvio discovers that Vin owes Pussy $30,000, which he believes may be his motive to have Pussy "disappear." Tony visits Pussy at home and questions him sympathetically, but Pussy does not respond. Tony is distrustful and confused; he tells Paulie he feels he is walking into walls.

Vin has a personal relationship with the madam of a bordello, and he is there when the police raid it. After his release from custody, Vin kills himself by jumping off a bridge. Jimmy is bailed out and visits Tony at his home; Tony is surprised that he was freed so soon. When Jimmy asks some intrusive questions about the Colombian drug heist, Tony evades them, confirming his suspicion that Jimmy is the rat; he and Pussy were arrested at the same time, and Vin's source confused the "two fat fucks with black hair". Pussy is no longer suspected, but he has disappeared.

Bitter that Tony has sold her house, Livia tells a visiting Junior that several capos have placed their mothers at the Green Grove retirement community and hold meetings there. Instantly suspecting that they are conspiring with Tony against him, he decides to assign Mikey and Chucky Signore to find hitmen from out of town.
