= The Sopranos season 1 =

Television show season

The Sopranos
- Season 1
- Season 1 DVD cover art
- Starring: James Gandolfini; Lorraine Bracco; Edie Falco; Michael Imperioli; Dominic Chianese; Vincent Pastore; Steven Van Zandt; Tony Sirico; Robert Iler; Jamie-Lynn Sigler; Nancy Marchand
- No. of episodes: 13

Release
- Original network: HBO
- Original release: January 10 – April 4, 1999

Season chronology
- Next → Season 2

The first season of the American crime drama series The Sopranos aired on HBO from January 10 to April 4, 1999. The first season was released on VHS and DVD in North America on December 12, 2000, and on Blu-ray on November 24, 2009.

The season introduces DiMeo crime family capo Tony Soprano and his family, as well as his troubled relationship with his mother Livia. Also troubled is his relationship with his Uncle Junior, who becomes locked in a power struggle with Tony after the death of the crime family boss, Jackie Aprile. Tony also begins therapy sessions with Dr. Melfi after suffering a panic attack.

Meanwhile, Tony's daughter Meadow becomes aware of her father's true profession while preparing to get into college, and Tony's nephew Christopher attempts to write a screenplay about his criminal life and anxiously awaits becoming a made man. Due to Junior's plotting of an assassination, Tony also gets embroiled in a plot against childhood friend Artie Bucco, a charming but obsequious restaurateur.

The season won the Golden Globe Award for Best Television Series – Drama, the Primetime Emmy Award for Outstanding Writing for a Drama Series for the episode "College", as well as several other accolades. James Gandolfini and Edie Falco received numerous accolades for their performances, including winning both Golden Globe Awards and Screen Actors Guild Awards.

== Cast ==
=== Main cast ===
- James Gandolfini as Anthony "Tony" Soprano, a capo in the DiMeo crime family that begins suffering panic attacks.
- Lorraine Bracco as Dr. Jennifer Melfi, Tony's therapist, to whom he develops an attraction.
- Edie Falco as Carmela Soprano, Tony's beleaguered wife who struggles with the morality of his work.
- Michael Imperioli as Christopher Moltisanti, Tony's young, ambitious cousin by marriage.
- Dominic Chianese as Corrado "Junior" Soprano Jr., a DiMeo capo and Tony's combative uncle.
- Vincent Pastore as Salvatore "Big Pussy" Bonpensiero, Tony's best friend and a DiMeo soldier.
- Steven Van Zandt as Silvio Dante, a loyal, intelligent soldier.
- Tony Sirico as Peter Paul "Paulie Walnuts" Gualtieri, a short-tempered soldier.
- Robert Iler as Anthony "A.J." Soprano Jr., Tony's troublemaker son.
- Jamie-Lynn Sigler as Meadow Soprano, Tony's high schooler daughter who questions her father's occupation.
- Nancy Marchand as Livia Soprano, Tony's petulant mother.

=== Recurring cast ===
- Al Sapienza as Michael "Mikey" Palmice, Junior's loyal soldier.
- Joe Badalucco Jr. as James "Jimmy" Altieri, a capo whose loyalty to the family wavers.
- Drea de Matteo as Adriana La Cerva, Chris's girlfriend.
- Jerry Adler as Herman "Hesh" Rabkin, an old Jewish friend of Tony's father.
- Tony Darrow as Lorenzo "Larry" Barese, the capo of the biggest crew in the family.
- Oksana Lada as Irina Peltsin, Tony's Russian comare.
- George Loros as Raymond "Ray" Curto, an experienced capo and the top choice to replace Aprile as boss.
- Anthony DeSando as Brendan Filone, a friend of Chris's who runs afoul of Junior.
- John Heard as Vin Makazian, a police detective in debt to Tony.
- Kathrine Narducci as Charmaine Bucco, Artie's moral wife who disapproves of his friendship with Tony.
- Paul Schulze as Phil Intintola, a local priest who develops an attraction to Carmela.
- John Ventimiglia as Arthur "Artie" Bucco, Tony's non-mob friend who runs a restaurant.
- Sharon Angela as Rosalie Aprile, Carmela's best friend and Jackie's wife.
- Michele DeCesare as Hunter Scangarelo, Meadow's best friend.
- Michael Rispoli as Giacomo "Jackie" Aprile, the cancer-stricken boss of the DiMeo family.
- Frank Santorelli as George "Georgie" Santorelli, a dim-witted employee at the strip club Tony runs.
- Matt Servitto as Dwight Harris, an FBI agent investigating the DiMeo family.
- Sal Ruffino as Charles "Chucky" Signore, a soldier in Junior's crew.
- Robert LuPone as Bruce Cusamano, Tony's physician neighbor who takes an interest in his occupation.
- Saundra Santiago as Jeannie Cusamano, Cusamano's wife.
- Vincent Curatola as John "Johnny Sack" Sacrimoni, the underboss of the New York-based Lupertazzi family.

== Episodes ==
Season 1 episodes
No. overall	No. in season	Title	Directed by	Written by	Original release date	U.S. viewers (millions)
1	1	"The Sopranos"	David Chase	David Chase	January 10, 1999	3.45
After a family of ducks he had been sheltering flies away, New Jersey DiMeo crime family capo Tony Soprano has a panic attack and is pointed to Dr. Jennifer Melfi for psychiatric help. When he tries to get his petulant mother Livia to go to a nursing home, her pushback forces a second attack, and he admits to Melfi that his work depresses him and that he was upset about the ducks because their flight reminded him of his fear of losing his family. Tony's protégé and cousin by marriage Chris Moltisanti executes a rival gangster to win Tony's favor, but finds his work ignored. Tony's uncle Corrado "Junior" Soprano plans to have a man killed at Nuovo Vesuvio, a restaurant run by Tony's friend Artie Bucco, so Tony has it burned, knowing a murder would irreparably damage its reputation. As Livia and Junior drive to Tony's house, Junior remarks that "something may have to be done" about him, and Livia quietly smiles.
2	2	"46 Long"	Dan Attias	David Chase	January 17, 1999	N/A
Chris and his friend Brendan Filone rob a trucking business that pays protection to Junior, who warns them to stop. Brendan accidentally kills a driver during the next robbery. Angry that Chris did nothing to stop him, Tony decides to let them both deal with the consequences. Tony's son Anthony Jr.'s teacher has his car stolen, so Tony sends soldiers Salvatore "Big Pussy" Bonpensiero and Paulie Gualtieri to find those responsible. They track down the gay couple who stole it and force them to steal another car, giving it to the teacher. After Livia injures her wrist driving, Tony moves her to the nursing home despite feeling guilt over not taking care of her, and almost has another attack while moving family photos out of her house. Despite Melfi trying to get him to stop displacing his anger towards Livia, Tony beats Georgie Santorelli, an employee at the Bada Bing, the strip club he runs, for mishandling the phone in a manner similar to her.
3	3	"Denial, Anger, Acceptance"	Nick Gomez	Mark Saraceni	January 24, 1999	N/A
Chris and Brendan return the stolen truck and Tony is given credit for solving the issue, prompting Junior to go to Livia for advice. He has Chris mock executed and watches as Brendan is killed by soldier Mikey Palmice. Tony is hired by a Jewish man who is being extorted by his son-in-law, and he attacks the man when he tries to back out on the deal, who derides him as a "golem". DiMeo boss Jackie Aprile is hospitalized with stomach cancer, and Melfi tries to get Tony to discuss his feelings on it, as well as asking if being compared to a monster upset him. He attends his daughter Meadow's choir recital and is moved to tears by her solo part, unaware that she has spent the past few days using speed sold to her by Chris to complete her schoolwork.
4	4	"Meadowlands"	John Patterson	Jason Cahill	January 31, 1999	N/A
Tensions rise after Tony beats Palmice for Brendan's murder and is unable to reach a compromise with Junior. After Aprile dies, Tony uses Melfi's advice on dealing with elders and backs Junior for boss of the family, allowing him to feel in control while Tony pulls the strings. He realizes his growing attraction to Melfi and has indebted police detective Vin Makazian tail her while she is on a date, but Makazian ends up beating up the man she is with. A.J. almost gets into a fight with a classmate, but the boy backs out because of who A.J.'s father is. Confused, he goes to Meadow, who reveals the true nature of Tony's work.
5	5	"College"	Allen Coulter	James Manos Jr. and David Chase	February 7, 1999	N/A
While taking Meadow to tour colleges, Tony spots Fabian Petrulio, a former DiMeo soldier who flipped on the family. Petrulio realizes he is being watched and follows Tony to his motel, where he almost kills him but is stopped by the presence of witnesses. The next day, Tony finds him at his place of business and strangles him. Meadow notices the bruises on Tony's hands, but he dodges her questioning. Tony's wife Carmela gets a call from Melfi, who Tony had told her was a man. Upset, she asks local priest Phil Intintola to stay when he comes over, confessing that she feels guilt over letting Tony commit crimes for her family. They almost kiss after some drinks, but Phil instead goes to the restroom and vomits. Carmela and Tony argue about Phil and Melfi when he returns.
6	6	"Pax Soprana"	Alan Taylor	Frank Renzulli	February 14, 1999	N/A
Tony's Prozac begins negatively affecting his sex drive, and he finds himself increasingly attracted to Melfi. He tries to kiss her and has her car repaired, but she rebuffs his advances. At the same time, he convinces Carmela that he feels no attraction to Melfi, and they reconcile. After Junior's tailor's grandson dies while on drugs, Junior has the dealer hunted down and killed, angering a DiMeo capo, as the dealer was his top earner. Junior begins taxing Tony's Jewish mob associate Herman "Hesh" Rabkin at Livia's suggestion without distributing the money to his capos, forcing Tony to negotiate with him. Tony shares his portion of the payment with Hesh. At Junior's celebration dinner, a waiter covertly takes pictures of everyone present with a button camera provided by the FBI. Junior's position on a federal chart of the DiMeo hierarchy is updated to "boss".
7	7	"Down Neck"	Lorraine Senna	Robin Green & Mitchell Burgess	February 21, 1999	N/A
After A.J. gets in trouble for being drunk in school, his parents learn that he may have ADD. Tony worries that his genes may have corrupted his son and that he will turn out to be like him, and so he tells Melfi a story from his childhood: His father Johnny would take his sister Janice somewhere often, but he was always excluded. Jealous, he hid in the trunk of Johnny's car and learned that he was taking Janice to a fair, but only so she could act as cover while he did illegal business. After young Tony watched Johnny get arrested, he felt a sense of pride that he realizes A.J. feels about him. When he learns that A.J. is a borderline case, he rejects any further testing. A.J. tells Livia that Tony is seeing a therapist.
8	8	"The Legend of Tennessee Moltisanti"	Tim Van Patten	Frank Renzulli and David Chase	February 28, 1999	N/A
Melfi and her ex-husband debate over whether or not she should continue treating Tony. Livia tells Junior that Tony is in therapy. The DiMeo family gets a tip that the FBI will soon be raiding them, so the capos hide and destroy any evidence of wrongdoing. Chris has nightmares about the man he killed, so he digs up the body and relocates it. As he struggles to write a mob screenplay and feels anger at not being recognized as a feared figure, he attacks a bakery employee and shoots him in the foot. He learns that his name is in the newspaper, which delights him.
9	9	"Boca"	Andy Wolk	Jason Cahill and Robin Green & Mitchell Burgess	March 7, 1999	N/A
Junior's girlfriend praises his cunnilingus talents against his wishes and word gets to Carmela; both Carmela and Tony make thinly veiled jokes about it around him. Furious, Junior breaks up with her, pulls his money out of her business, and reveals Tony's therapy to Palmice, who believes Tony is informing on them. Meadow's soccer coach makes plans to leave town for a better job, while the team's star player reveals to Meadow that the coach had sex with her. Tony prepares to have him killed until Artie tries to get him to change his mind. After drinking excessively, Tony calls off the hit, and the coach is arrested after one of the teammates reports on him.
10	10	"A Hit Is a Hit"	Matthew Penn	Joe Bosso and Frank Renzulli	March 14, 1999	N/A
Chris tries to fulfill his girlfriend Adriana La Cerva's dream of being involved in music production by meeting with a gangster rapper, who is in a dispute with Hesh about royalties. When he and Hesh agree to sue each other, Tony's crew mocks the rapper for going through the legal system. Adriana's first recording goes poorly and Hesh rejects their material. Tony's neighbor Bruce Cusamano invites him to play golf with his friends. They make Tony uncomfortable with questions about mob life, and he tells Melfi about a boy from his childhood with a cleft palate he and his friends used to mock, only understanding his pain after being humiliated at the club. As revenge, Tony pranks Cusamano by filling a box with sand and leaving it with him to hold on to, and he and his wife Jeannie nervously try to guess what illegal contents may be inside.
11	11	"Nobody Knows Anything"	Henry J. Bronchtein	Frank Renzulli	March 21, 1999	N/A
The FBI raids a card game and arrest capo Jimmy Altieri. Pussy is caught but mysteriously released. Makazian informs Tony that he heard Pussy is wearing a wire. Tony sends Paulie to confirm the existence of the wire and Paulie takes Pussy to a bath house, but Pussy refuses to take his clothes off, citing high blood pressure. At the same time, Tony learns that Makazian, who kills himself after being caught in a brothel, may have had ulterior motives for implicating Pussy. Altieri is released and talks to Tony, who realizes from his strange behavior that he is the informant. Junior learns from Livia that the mothers of several of his capos have been placed in her nursing home, and he realizes they are meeting behind his back. He has his men organize a hit on Tony.
12	12	"Isabella"	Allen Coulter	Robin Green & Mitchell Burgess	March 28, 1999	4.19
Pussy disappears, leaving Tony depressed and listless. He meets Isabella, a young Italian exchange student watching over the Cusamanos' house while they are away, and fantasizes about her nursing a baby named Antonio. When she disappears, Melfi realizes the lithium she had him taking was causing him to hallucinate, and explains that Isabella was an idealized maternal figure. Chris unwittingly saves Tony's life when he checks on him, his car blocking the two hitmen who were sent to kill Tony. When the contractor jokes about Livia being responsible for the hit, Junior has Palmice kill him. The next day, the hitmen strike, but Tony survives after one of them accidentally kills the other. Junior and Livia go to check on him, where she feigns memory loss.
13	13	"I Dream of Jeannie Cusamano"	John Patterson	David Chase	April 4, 1999	5.22
Tony almost attacks Melfi when she suggests that Livia may have borderline personality disorder, and warns her to go into hiding because of Junior's attempted hit. He reluctantly tells his men that he is seeing Melfi, but they accept and encourage him. He has Altieri and Palmice executed, as well as killing the man he suspects Junior will send after him next. The FBI arrest Junior using information from Altieri, although he refuses to inform on Tony. Carmela notices Phil getting close with Aprile's widow Rosalie and calls him out on his pattern of seducing "spiritually thirsty" married women. Livia tells Artie that Tony was the one who burned Nuovo Vesuvio, and Tony convinces him while being held at gunpoint that he was not responsible. When Livia has a stroke and the FBI inform Tony that they taped her subtly convincing Junior to put out the hit, he goes to the hospital to kill her, but is stopped by the staff taking her away. A storm knocks out the power in the Soprano household, so the family goes to the rebuilt Nuovo Vesuvio, where Tony advises his children to "remember the little moments that were good."

== Reception ==
=== Critical response ===
The first season of The Sopranos was met with wide acclaim, receiving a score of 88 out of 100 on Metacritic, and a 98% approval rating on Rotten Tomatoes with an average score of 9.3/10, the latter site reporting the critical consensus as, "The Sopranos smartly runs an emotional gamut, offering detailed character work and riveting suspense while displaying a flair for both comedy and drama." James Gandolfini was widely hailed for his performance, with Ken Tucker of Entertainment Weekly praising his "magnificently shrewd, wary performance" as Tony Soprano. Deseret News expressed approval for the show's clear insight into the "modern incarnations of family and mortality and ambition."

Marvin Kitman of Newsday wrote, "It's a great show, the best new series of the year. It's so - dare I say it? - original. It catches you off guard. Basically, it's everything I'm always looking for in drama. It's beautifully written, authentic, without the plastic Los Angeles look. The acting is marvelous. It's funny in a darkly comedic way, involving as a soap opera, and quirky. I never quite know what's going to happen, even though the subject matter is by no means unprecedented for television."

=== Awards and nominations ===
Year	Association	Category	Nominee(s)	Result	Ref.
1999	Primetime Emmy Awards	Outstanding Drama Series		Nominated	
1999	Primetime Emmy Awards	Outstanding Lead Actor in a Drama Series	James Gandolfini (Episode: "Pilot")	Nominated	
1999	Primetime Emmy Awards	Outstanding Lead Actress in a Drama Series	Edie Falco (episode: "College")	Won	
1999	Primetime Emmy Awards	Outstanding Lead Actress in a Drama Series	Lorraine Bracco (episode: "The Legend of Tennessee Moltisanti")	Nominated	
1999	Primetime Emmy Awards	Outstanding Supporting Actress in a Drama Series	Nancy Marchand (episodes: "Pilot" + "46 Long")	Nominated	
1999	Primetime Emmy Awards	Outstanding Guest Actor in a Drama Series	John Heard (episode: "Nobody Knows Anything")	Nominated	
1999	Primetime Emmy Awards	Outstanding Directing for a Drama Series	David Chase (episode: "Pilot")	Nominated	
1999	Primetime Emmy Awards	Outstanding Writing for a Drama Series	David Chase (episode: "Pilot")	Nominated	
1999	Primetime Emmy Awards	Outstanding Writing for a Drama Series	Robin Green, Mitchell Burgess (episode: "Isabella")	Nominated	
1999	Primetime Emmy Awards	Outstanding Writing for a Drama Series	James Manos Jr. (episode: "College")	Won	
1999	Primetime Emmy Awards	Outstanding Writing for a Drama Series	Frank Renzulli (episode: "Nobody Knows Anything")	Nominated	
1999	Golden Globe Awards	Best Drama Series		Won	
1999	Golden Globe Awards	Best Actor in a Drama Series	James Gandolfini	Won	
1999	Golden Globe Awards	Best Actress in a Drama Series	Edie Falco	Won	
1999	Golden Globe Awards	Best Actress in a Drama Series	Lorraine Bracco	Nominated	
1999	Golden Globe Awards	Best Supporting Actress – Television	Nancy Marchand	Won	
1999	Screen Actors Guild Awards	Outstanding Ensemble in a Drama Series	Entire Cast	Won	
1999	Screen Actors Guild Awards	Outstanding Actor in a Drama Series	James Gandolfini	Won	
1999	Screen Actors Guild Awards	Outstanding Actress in a Drama Series	Edie Falco	Won	
1999	Screen Actors Guild Awards	Outstanding Actress in a Drama Series	Lorraine Bracco	Nominated	
1999	Screen Actors Guild Awards	Outstanding Actress in a Drama Series	Nancy Marchand	Nominated	
1999	Directors Guild of America Award	Outstanding Directing in a Drama Series	David Chase (episode: "Pilot")	Won	
1999	Directors Guild of America Award	Outstanding Directing in a Drama Series	Allen Coulter (episode: "College")	Nominated	
1999	Directors Guild of America Award	Outstanding Directing in a Drama Series	Daniel Attias (episode: "46 Long")	Nominated	
1999	Directors Guild of America Award	Outstanding Directing in a Drama Series	Henry J. Bronchtein (episode: "Nobody Knows Anything")	Nominated	
1999	Writers Guild of America Award	Best Drama Episode	Jason Cahill (episode: "Meadowlands")	Won	
1999	TCA Awards	Program of the Year		Yes	
1999	TCA Awards	Outstanding Achievement in Drama		Won	
1999	TCA Awards	Outstanding New Program of the Year		Won	
1999	TCA Awards	Outstanding Individual Achievement in Drama	David Chase	Nominated	
1999	TCA Awards	Outstanding Individual Achievement in Drama	James Gandolfini	Won	
1999	Satellite Awards	Best Drama Series		Nominated	
1999	Satellite Awards	Best Actor in a Drama Series	James Gandolfini	Nominated	
1999	Satellite Awards	Best Actress in a Drama Series	Lorraine Bracco	Nominated	
1999	Satellite Awards	Best Actress in a Drama Series	Edie Falco	Nominated	
