= 46 Long =

- The Sopranos episode
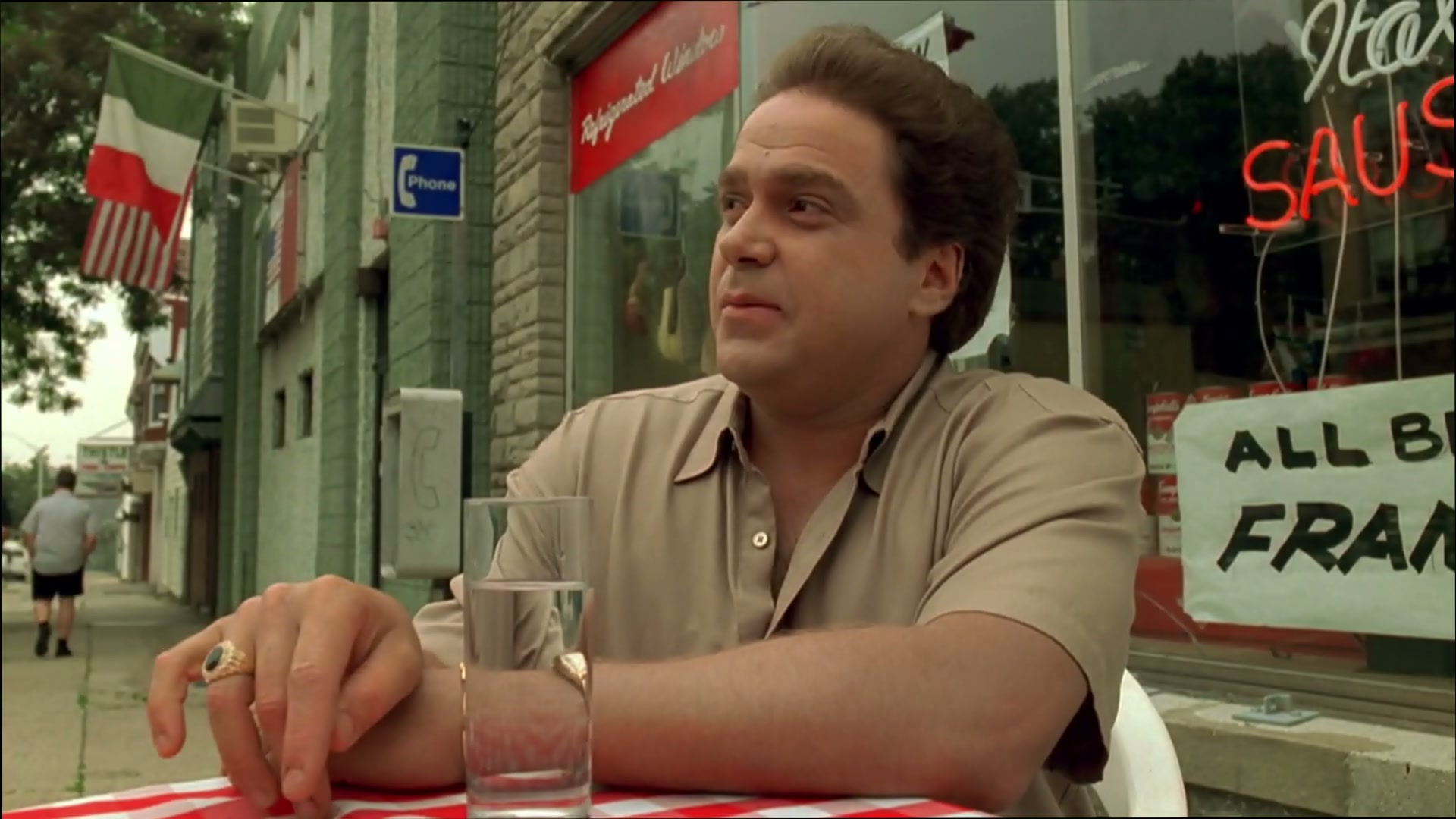
- Jackie Aprile, Sr. having a sitdown with Tony Soprano
- Episode no.: Season 1 Episode 2
- Directed by: Dan Attias
- Written by: David Chase
- Cinematography by: Alik Sakharov
- Production code: 102
- Original air date: January 17, 1999
- Running time: 50 minutes

Episode chronology
← Previous "The Sopranos"	Next → "Denial, Anger, Acceptance"
- The Sopranos season 1

"46 Long" is the second episode of the first season of the HBO original series The Sopranos. It was written by David Chase, directed by Dan Attias and was originally broadcast on January 17, 1999, in the United States.

== Synopsis ==
After A.J.'s science teacher has his car stolen, Carmela persuades Tony to help find it. Tony tells Salvatore "Big Pussy" Bonpensiero, who runs an auto repair shop, to look out for the vehicle. The thieves are found, but the car has already been "chopped", so they are told to steal another car of the same make and model. The teacher is surprised when the car is "returned" with the same plates, but with different keys and a different color.

Christopher and his friend Brendan Filone, who is a meth user, hijack a shipment of DVD players. They deliver the goods to Tony, Silvio and Paulie Gualtieri at Silvio's strip club, the Bada Bing. However, the trucking company pays protection money to Junior, who arranges a sit-down with Tony and the DiMeo family's acting boss, Jackie Aprile, Sr. Jackie rules that $15,000 in restitution be made, which Tony accepts, but Christopher, who thinks he is due his button, attempts to reject. Tony insists on receiving the full amount, saying he will talk Junior down, but Christopher is aware that Tony will take some for himself and little will be left for him and Brendan.

Although they have been told not to target the trucking company again, Christopher and Brendan, both high on cocaine, plan to hijack a shipment of Italian suits. However, when Brendan arrives to pick him up, Christopher, stoned and reflective, backs out of the job. Brendan proceeds with the hijacking along with two inexperienced associates. One of them drops his gun, which discharges when it hits the ground, killing the truck driver. When Tony learns of this, he orders Christopher and Brendan to return the whole consignment to Junior and come to terms with him, though not before his crew help themselves to a few of the suits.

A small fire occurs while Livia is cooking. Tony insists that she accept a live-in nurse, who Livia soon provokes into quitting. While driving, she forgets to shift her car into reverse and badly injures a friend of hers to whom she has just given a ride. As a result, Livia is forced to move into the Green Grove retirement home. At her house, while collecting photos of himself as a child with his parents, Tony nearly has another panic attack.

Although Tony tells his mother, "You've got to stop with this black poison cloud, because I can't take it anymore!" he cannot bear hard words about her from Dr. Melfi. After he discloses feelings of guilt, Melfi says that he must either acknowledge or displace his "feelings of hatred" toward his mother; he walks out. At the Bada Bing, when Georgie Santorelli, the bartender, clumsily uses the telephone in a manner similar to Livia, Tony grabs the handset and beats him with it.

== Cast ==
- James Gandolfini as Tony Soprano
- Lorraine Bracco as Dr. Jennifer Melfi
- Edie Falco as Carmela Soprano
- Michael Imperioli as Christopher Moltisanti
- Dominic Chianese as Corrado Soprano, Jr.
- Vincent Pastore as Pussy Bonpensiero
- Steven Van Zandt as Silvio Dante
- Tony Sirico as Paulie Gualtieri
- Robert Iler as Anthony Soprano, Jr.
- Jamie-Lynn Sigler as Meadow Soprano
- Nancy Marchand as Livia Soprano

=== Guest starring ===
- Michael Rispoli as Jackie Aprile, Sr.

==== Also guest starring ====
- Al Sapienza as Mikey Palmice
- Anthony DeSando as Brendan Filone
- Drea de Matteo as Adriana La Cerva
- Frank Santorelli as Georgie
- Johann Carlo as Bonnie DiCaprio
- Debrah Ellen Waller as Perrilyn
- Mike Epps as Jerome
- Yancey Arias as Eduardo Arnaz
- Tibor Feldman as U.S. Attorney Braun
- Harvey Levin as Talk Show Host
- Steven Randazzo as Vincent Rizzo
- Kate Anthony as Counter Person
- Anthony Caso as Martin Scorsese (misspelled Martin Scorcese)
- Victor Colicchio as Joe
- Marcia Haufrecht as Fanny
- Desiree Kehoe as Nude Dancer
- Michael Park as Bouncer
- Sharif Rashed as Antjuan
- Charles Santy as Truck Driver
- David Schulman as Mr. Miller
- Manny Silverio as 2nd Truck Driver
- J.D. Williams as Special K

== Production ==
Drea de Matteo, who played the restaurant's hostess in the pilot episode, appears in a new role as Christopher's girlfriend, Adriana La Cerva. De Matteo was initially cast as the hostess in the pilot episode only, but creator David Chase liked her performance so much that he developed the role of Adriana for her starting with this episode.

== Reception ==
Alan Sepinwall wrote of the episode that "some of it – particularly anything involving Tony and Livia [...] feels fully-formed and very much of a piece with what we would come to know as one of the greatest shows ever made. And some of it is David Chase still fiddling with the knobs and levers"; Sepinwall considered the family-oriented scenes strong while viewing the subplot about the car theft as "still on the broader, lighter end of the comedy spectrum, [...] It's not bad, but it's not quite right, either." In The A.V. Club, however, Emily St. James praised "46 Long" as "a confident expansion of the show's universe," considering it an example of "the show's keen sense of generational conflict, of the ways that different kinds of people come into conflict with each other."
