= Isabella (The Sopranos) =

- The Sopranos episode
- Episode no.: Season 1 Episode 12
- Directed by: Allen Coulter
- Written by: Robin Green; Mitchell Burgess
- Cinematography by: Phil Abraham
- Production code: 112
- Original air date: March 28, 1999
- Running time: 47 minutes

Episode chronology
← Previous "Nobody Knows Anything"	Next → "I Dream of Jeannie Cusamano"
- The Sopranos season 1

"Isabella" is the 12th episode of the HBO original series The Sopranos. Written by Robin Green and Mitchell Burgess, and directed by Allen Coulter, it originally aired on March 28, 1999.

== Starring ==
- James Gandolfini as Tony Soprano
- Lorraine Bracco as Dr. Jennifer Melfi
- Edie Falco as Carmela Soprano
- Michael Imperioli as Christopher Moltisanti
- Dominic Chianese as Corrado Soprano, Jr.
- Vincent Pastore as Pussy Bonpensiero *
- Steven Van Zandt as Silvio Dante
- Tony Sirico as Paulie Gualtieri
- Robert Iler as Anthony Soprano, Jr.
- Jamie-Lynn Sigler as Meadow Soprano
- Nancy Marchand as Livia Soprano

* = credit only

=== Guest starring ===
- Maria Grazia Cucinotta as Isabella
- Al Sapienza as Mikey Palmice
- Paul Schulze as Father Phil
- Matt Servitto as Agent Harris
- Joe Badalucco, Jr. as Jimmy Altieri
- John Eddins as William "Petite" Clayborn
- Touche as Rasheen Ray
- Kareen Germaine as Nurse
- Johnathan Mondel as Boy
- Jack O'Connell as Vendor
- Katalin Pota as Lilliana
- Denise Richardson as Newscaster
- Sal Ruffino as Chucky Signore
- Bittu Walia as Doctor
- David Wike as Donnie Paduana

== Synopsis ==
Tony, deeply depressed after Pussy's unexplained disappearance, sees a beautiful Italian woman in the Cusamanos' backyard next door. She tells him her name is Isabella and that she is an exchange student staying there while the Cusamanos are away. Tony takes her out to lunch and she describes the beauty of Avellino, where Tony's grandfather came from. He has a daydream about Isabella in a rocking chair in a village house, nursing a baby named Antonio. One day, Isabella is no longer there. When the Cusamanos return, Tony asks about her and realizes he has been hallucinating. Dr. Melfi instructs him to stop taking lithium and theorizes that Isabella was an idealized maternal figure.

Mikey, acting through Donnie Paduana, contracts two gunmen to carry out the hit on Tony. Uncle Junior cannot bear to hear the details of the plan when Mikey tries to report. Meanwhile, Christopher is concerned about Tony's emotional state and secretly follows him; he unknowingly prevents the hit when he pulls his car up next to the assassins', blocking their view of Tony. Mikey and Donnie urgently meet about the failed attempt, with Junior hiding in the backseat of Mikey's car. Donnie promises to try the hit again the next day and casually remarks that even Tony's mother wants him dead. Junior, fearing Donnie's "big mouth", has Mikey kill him.

The next day, the assassins make their move while Tony is running errands, only for one hitman to accidentally kill the other. After a ferocious struggle, Tony leaves the other gunman on the street and drives away, but crashes into a parked car. At the hospital, Tony says that his injuries occurred in an attempted carjacking, a story that not even A.J. believes. FBI Agent Harris comes to his bed and offers a deal, including immunity from prosecution, which Tony scornfully rejects. The next day, Livia and Junior visit Tony at home. Livia appears not to know who Meadow is; Junior later comments on the "good timing" of this apparent memory loss.

== Deceased ==
- Donnie Paduana: shot by Mikey Palmice on orders of Uncle Junior.
- William "Petite" Clayborn: accidentally shot by his partner, Rasheen Ray, in the failed attempt on Tony Soprano's life.

== Title reference ==
Isabella is the Italian exchange student Tony hallucinates.

== Music ==
- The song played at the Bada Bing when Christopher and Silvio discuss Tony's depression is "Ugly Stadium" by Tipsy.
- The song that is played twice during this episode (when Tony is in his bedroom, and again during the "carjacking") is "Tiny Tears" by Tindersticks.
- The song played as the would-be assassins are stalking Tony at the newsstand is "Cry" by Thornetta Davis.
- The song that is played briefly after Tony's meeting with Dr. Melfi, when he runs into Isabella, is "Ballad of Tindersticks (instrumental)" also by Tindersticks.
- The song played when Tony and Isabella have lunch is "Milonga del Angel" by Al Di Meola.
- The song played while Mikey kills Donnie Paduana is "Temptation Waits" by Garbage.
- The song played over the end credits is "I Feel Free" by Cream.

== Filming locations ==
Listed in order of first appearance:

- Belleville, New Jersey
- Satin Dolls in Lodi, New Jersey
- North Caldwell, New Jersey
- Montclair, New Jersey
- Greenpoint, Brooklyn
- Van Vleck House in Montclair, New Jersey
- West Orange, New Jersey

== Reception ==
Alan Sepinwall has lauded "Isabella" as one of the greatest episodes of The Sopranos. Emily St. James found the subplot with the titular character to be outlandish, but still described the episode as featuring "classic scene after classic scene".
