= A Hit Is a Hit =

- The Sopranos episode
- Episode no.: Season 1 Episode 10
- Directed by: Matthew Penn
- Written by: Joe Bosso; Frank Renzulli
- Cinematography by: Phil Abraham
- Production code: 110
- Original air date: March 14, 1999
- Running time: 53 minutes

Episode chronology
← Previous "Boca"	Next → "Nobody Knows Anything"
- The Sopranos season 1

"A Hit Is a Hit" is the 10th episode of the HBO original series The Sopranos. Written by Joe Bosso and Frank Renzulli, and directed by Matthew Penn, it originally aired on March 14, 1999.

== Starring ==
- James Gandolfini as Tony Soprano
- Lorraine Bracco as Dr. Jennifer Melfi
- Edie Falco as Carmela Soprano
- Michael Imperioli as Christopher Moltisanti
- Dominic Chianese as Corrado Soprano, Jr. *
- Vincent Pastore as Pussy Bonpensiero
- Steven Van Zandt as Silvio Dante
- Tony Sirico as Paulie Gualtieri
- Robert Iler as Anthony Soprano, Jr. *
- Jamie-Lynn Sigler as Meadow Soprano
- Nancy Marchand as Livia Soprano *

* = credit only

=== Guest starring ===
- Jerry Adler as Hesh Rabkin
- Drea de Matteo as Adriana
- Bokeem Woodbine as Massive Genius

==== Also guest starring ====
- Oksana Lada as Irina Peltsin
- Bryan Hicks as Orange J
- Nick Fowler as Richie Santini
- Gregg Wattenberg as Vito
- Chris Gibson as Bass Player
- Ned Stroh as Drummer
- Bray Poor as Squid
- Robert LuPone as Dr. Bruce Cusamano
- Jim Demarse as Jack Krim
- James Weston as Randy Wagner
- Phil Coccioletti as Eric
- Terumi Matthews as Rita
- Dan Morse as Mullethead
- Alexandra Neil as Wendy Krim
- Ken Prymus as Manager
- Saundra Santiago as Jean Cusamano
- Jessy Terrero as Gallegos
- Elizabeth Ann Townsend as Barb Wagner
- Cedric Turner as Police Officer

== Synopsis ==
Paulie, Christopher and Pussy rob and kill a Colombian drug dealer. They gain a huge amount of cash; as Tony says, a once-in-a-lifetime score.

Christopher and Adriana meet Massive Genius, a wealthy gangster rapper, and Christopher arranges a sit-down for him with Hesh Rabkin. Massive says he is acting on behalf of the mother of a deceased black singer whose royalties Hesh stole, and now claims $400,000. Hesh refuses, and threatens a counterclaim: there is an unauthorized sampling by Massive's record label of a song, the copyright of which is owned by Hesh's label. Massive says he will see Hesh in court. When the conversation is over, Tony and his crew jeer at a self-proclaimed gangster who works within the legal system.

Adriana proposes that she should pursue a career as a music producer and that Massive can help. Christopher, flush with money, agrees to finance a demo for the band Visiting Day, whose singer, Richie Santini, is Adriana's ex-boyfriend. The demo recording progresses slowly and Christopher smashes Richie's guitar over his back in frustration. Christopher is told by Hesh that the band is not good and realizes that Massive is helping them only because of his sexual interest in Adriana. When he tells her this, Adriana accuses him of trying to hold her back and storms out.

Carmela wonders whether she and her children will be alright if anything happens to Tony, but he reassures her. A friend introduces her to the stock market and gives her a tip; she buys and profits.

Tony, keen to mix with meddigans (white Americans not of Italian descent or Italian-Americans that don't act "Italian") accepts an invitation from his neighbor and family physician, Dr. Bruce Cusamano, to play a round of golf at a country club along with his friends. They pester Tony with questions about organized crime. As he later tells Dr. Melfi, he feels he is being "used for somebody else's amusement, like a dancing bear." In revenge, Tony persuades Dr. Cusamano to keep a package (of sand) safely for him, pretending it contains something sinister.

== First appearances ==
- Jean Cusamano: Wife of Dr. Cusamano and friend of the Soprano family

== Deceased ==
- Gallegos a.k.a. "Juan Valdez": Shot in the forehead by Paulie Gualtieri

== Title reference ==
- The title refers to when Hesh Rabkin mentions to Christopher that he knows a hit song when he hears one, saying "a hit is a hit" and that the band Visiting Day's song is not a hit, and they are not particularly talented.
- Giving the title a double meaning, a hit is also the slang term for a mafia-ordered murder; the episode opens with a hit on a Colombian drug dealer, and while hosting Tony in a golf game at his country club, Bruce Cusamano refers to mobster Carmine Galante's assassination as a "fuckin' beautiful hit".

== Other cultural references ==
- One of Massive's entourage refers to Chris as Donnie Brasco.
- Massive references The Godfather, The Godfather Part II, as well as The Godfather Part III, the latter of which he labels as "misunderstood."
- While golfing with Bruce Cusamano and his friends, they ask him if he had ever met John Gotti; Tony tells a made-up story about Gotti's fondness for a certain kind of ice cream truck, which enthralls them. They also mention Umberto's Clam House in New York City, and ask Tony if he has ever been to Mount Plymouth, Florida where Al Capone used to go to play golf. Bruce later tells Tony that the golf club's membership books are closed, seemingly drawing a parallel to the memberships in becoming a made man (Where "open(ing) the books" indicates a faction is prospecting for new members while "Close(ing) the books" indicates they are not accepting new members)
- At a dinner party, Bruce Cusamano refers to the scene where Joe Pesci's character puts Tony Dogs's head in a vise in Casino.
- An envious Christopher complains to Adriana that Massive Genius lives in The Hamptons where he is visited by Alec Baldwin and Whitney Houston.
- Christopher names what he considers to be "great Italian singers: "Frankie Valli, Dion, and The Rascals. Adriana then turns up the Bon Jovi song "You Give Love a Bad Name" as "paisan pride."
- When Adriana asks what "experts" Christopher discussed the Visiting Day demo with, he names Hesh and also Silvio, who he says used to own "rock clubs in Asbury". Steven Van Zandt is a Springsteen side-man and a key figure in the Asbury music scene.
- Hesh refers to Jimi Hendrix and the Cafe Wha? when referring to musical talent.
- Chris and Adriana go to see Rent on Broadway.

== Music ==
- The song played when Tony, Christopher, and Paulie celebrate their big score at a hotel with their Cumares is "A Dreamer's Holiday" by Ray Anthony.
- The song played when Christopher and Adriana come to a party at Massive Genius' mansion is "DJ Keep Playin' (Get Your Music On)" by Yvette Michele.
- Earlier in the episode, while Christopher and Adriana talk about their tastes in music, she plays "You Give Love a Bad Name" by Bon Jovi.
- When Christopher and Adriana hatch their music management plan over dinner, the background song is "Decara a la pared" from Lhasa De Sela's album "La Llorona".
- The song played when Christopher and Adriana take Massive Genius to a club to watch Visiting Day perform. Also later, when Visiting Day try to cut their record; and later still, when Adriana plays the song for Massive Genius, and Christopher plays the song for Hesh is "Erase Myself" by the fictional band Visiting Day.
- The song played when Hesh looks over his mementos from his days running a record label is "Fools Follow Angels" by Little Jimmy Willis.
- The background song when Adriana is modeling her black dress for Christopher near the end of the episode is "Why" by Annie Lennox.
- The song played in one of the closing scenes, which Hesh hears and then says to Christopher, "Now uh... that's a hit", is "Nobody Loves Me But You" by Dori Hartley.
- The songs performed by the episode's fictional band, Visiting Day/Defiler, were created and performed bespoke by Gregg Wattenberg and Nick Fowler. "Defile You" is played over the end credits.

== Filming locations ==
Listed in order of first appearance:

- North Caldwell, New Jersey
- Soundview, Bronx
- Livingston, New Jersey
- Jersey City, New Jersey
- Glen Head, New York
