= Guy Walks into a Psychiatrist's Office... =

- The Sopranos episode
- Episode no.: Season 2 Episode 1
- Directed by: Allen Coulter
- Written by: Jason Cahill
- Cinematography by: Phil Abraham
- Production code: 201
- Original air date: January 16, 2000
- Running time: 49 minutes

Episode chronology
← Previous "I Dream of Jeannie Cusamano"	Next → "Do Not Resuscitate"
- The Sopranos season 2

"Guy Walks into a Psychiatrist's Office..." is the 14th episode of the HBO original series The Sopranos and the first of the show's second season. Written by Jason Cahill and directed by Allen Coulter, it originally aired on January 16, 2000.

== Starring ==
- James Gandolfini as Tony Soprano
- Lorraine Bracco as Dr. Jennifer Melfi
- Edie Falco as Carmela Soprano
- Michael Imperioli as Christopher Moltisanti
- Dominic Chianese as Corrado Soprano, Jr.
- Vincent Pastore as Big Pussy Bonpensiero
- Steven Van Zandt as Silvio Dante
- Tony Sirico as Paulie Gualtieri
- Robert Iler as Anthony Soprano, Jr.
- Jamie-Lynn Sigler as Meadow Soprano
- Drea de Matteo as Adriana La Cerva
- Aida Turturro as Janice Soprano
- Nancy Marchand as Livia Soprano

=== Guest starring ===
- Jerry Adler as Hesh Rabkin

==== Also guest starring ====
- Lillo Brancato Jr. as Matt Bevilaqua
- Chris Tardio as Sean Gismonte
- Oksana Lada as Irina Peltsin
- Nicole Burdette as Barbara Giglione
- David Margulies as Neil Mink
- Tom Aldredge as Hugh DeAngelis
- John Billeci as Manager
- Darrell Carey as Proctor
- Dan Chen as Ernest Wu
- Robert Cicchini as Dr. D'Alessio
- John Fiore as Gigi Cestone
- Mark Fish as Caller #2
- Karen Giordano as Samantha Martin
- Bryan Greenberg as Peter McClure
- Dan Grimaldi as Philly Parisi
- Philipp Kaner as Caller #3
- Katrina Lantz as Sylvia
- George Loros as Raymond Curto
- Wayne W. Pretlow as Caller #1
- Suzanne Shepherd as Mary DeAngelis
- Kevin Sussman as Kevin
- Roberto Thomas as Lee
- Ed Vassallo as Tom Giglione
- Terence Patrick Winter as Tom Amberson

== Synopsis ==
Several months after Mikey Palmice's murder, Livia Soprano's hospitalization, and Uncle Junior's arrest, business appears to be returning to normal for the DiMeo crime family. Tony Soprano is no longer receiving therapy from Dr. Melfi and is self-medicating. When his mother is mentioned, Tony insists that she is dead to him. Money is still coming in from Tony's capos. Phillip Parisi is killed for spreading gossip about Tony, his mother and his uncle.

Tony's older sister Janice arrives from Seattle. Tony is apprehensive because he knows she will make financial demands but lets her stay at his home. At a family gathering, Carmela smiles as she watches Tony embracing Janice and his younger sister, Barbara. Janice is interested in Livia's will and her house; Tony is trying to sell the house and suspects that Janice is trying to obstruct the sale.

Tony's mood worsens after Janice arrives. While driving, he passes out and runs off the road. He consults a new psychiatrist, who tells Tony that he recognizes him and is not taking new patients. He phones Melfi in the motel room where she is currently seeing patients, and tells her things are now safe; she is frightened, realizing that Tony knows where she is. Tony confronts Melfi in a diner and tries to apologize. Melfi states that one of her other patients died by suicide because her treatment was disrupted, and angrily tells Tony to "get out of my life."

Christopher Moltisanti hires someone to take his stockbroker's licensing exam and becomes the SEC compliance officer for a boiler room conducting a "pump and dump" scam. He is assisted by two young men eager to make a mark, Matt Bevilaqua and Sean Gismonte. While Christopher is out of the office, the pair beat a broker for providing genuine investment advice. Tony rebukes Christopher, telling him to take his responsibilities seriously, but ends the meeting with a smile.

Big Pussy Bonpensiero appears at Tony's home one morning. In his basement, Pussy explains that he has been in Puerto Rico having his back treated and got involved with a woman there. He expresses his resentment at being suspected of turning informant. Tony is initially furious that Pussy has not been in touch. He pats him down while giving him a hug; when Pussy is offended, he pulls him in for a real hug. He allows Pussy to start earning again but remains suspicious, though his story appears to check out.

== First appearances ==
- Hugh De Angelis: Carmela's father.
- Mary De Angelis: Carmela's mother.
- Matthew Bevilaqua and Sean Gismonte: Associates who work as stockbrokers at Christopher's firm who are looking to get themselves recognized by the DiMeo crime family.
- Gigi Cestone: soldier in the Junior Soprano crew.
- Neil Mink: Tony Soprano's attorney and confidante.
- Thomas Giglione: Barbara Soprano's husband and Tony and Janice's brother-in-law.
- This also marks the first present-day appearances of Janice Soprano (also known as Parvati Wasatch): Tony's older sister, who resurfaces after a 20-year absence while living in Seattle, and Barbara Soprano Giglione: Tony's younger sister, who lives in Brewster, New York. Previously, both of these characters appeared (as children) in flashbacks in "Down Neck".

== Deceased ==
- Philly "Spoons" Parisi: killed by Gigi Cestone for spreading rumors that Tony likes to "fluff his mother's pillows." Dan Grimaldi later returned to the series as Philly's twin brother, Patsy.

== Title reference ==
- The episode's title is intended to be the beginning of a joke (for example, "Guy walks into a bar and..."). It refers to Tony's therapy sessions.

== Production ==
- Drea de Matteo (Adriana La Cerva) and Aida Turturro (Janice Soprano) are now billed in the opening credits.
- Show producer/writer/director Terence Winter appears as minor character Tom Amberson, a Dr. Melfi patient in the first of his three series' appearances. Winter was filling in when no other actor pleased director Allen Coulter.

== References to past episodes ==
- It is revealed in this episode that Carmela's parents have avoided family functions at the Soprano home that Livia attended for years.
- In Season One episode "Nobody Knows Anything" Tony tells Livia that her house, which he put up for sale, has an accepted offer, a move that angered Livia so much that she revealed to Junior that Tony and his capos held secret meetings at Green Grove. However, in this episode, Tony reveals to Janice that he just had the house put on the market.

== Cultural references ==
- Edward G. Robinson, playing a mobster, is briefly seen and heard as Key Largo plays on a TV in Christopher's apartment.
- When Adriana picks up Christopher in his office, she calls him "E.F." and tells him she "is listening"; a reference to the ads for brokerage of E.F. Hutton and their 1970s advertising slogan "When E.F. Hutton talks, people listen".
- Silvio makes several imitations of actors in The Godfather and The Godfather Part III.
- At Tony's cookout, the crew chats about Shelley Hack (of Charlie's Angels fame), leading to Paulie Gualtieri singing the jingle for Charlie cologne. Besides co-starring on Charlie's Angels, Shelley Hack was also the model appearing in advertisements for Charlie perfume by Revlon.
- Phillip Parisi's death is a reference to The Godfather (1972) when Paulie Gatto is shot and killed in the driver's seat of a car because of his role in the attempted murder of Vito Corleone. Also, as Philly gets in his car to leave home, his wife tells him, "Don't forget the pastries", a reference to the scene where Peter Clemenza's wife also tells him, "Don't forget the cannoli", before he drives off to see that Paulie is killed.
- When Tony is seeing his prospective new psychiatrist using an assumed name, and the psychiatrist says that he recognizes Tony from the news, he also mentions the 1999 comedy film Analyze This, a film that stars Robert De Niro as a gangster who is seeing a psychiatrist, played by Billy Crystal.

== Music ==
- After the opening credits, the episode shows the status of all the major characters, overscored by Frank Sinatra's "It Was a Very Good Year".
- The song played during Sil's The Godfather prank in the Bing! is "Nod Off" by Skeleton Key.
- During the Soprano family barbecue, Andrea Bocelli's "Con te partirò" is playing in the background.
- While Tony is driving in his truck before he passes out and crashes, he is listening to Deep Purple's "Smoke on the Water" (a song also used in the Season Six episode "Join the Club").
- The song played when Christopher is in the bar with Adriana, Matthew and Sean is Alejandro Escovedo's "Guilty" from his 1999 album Bourbonitis Blues.
- The song played over the end credits is "Time Is on My Side" by Irma Thomas.

== Filming locations ==
Listed in order of first appearance:

- Montclair, New Jersey
- Fort Lee, New Jersey
- Ridgefield, New Jersey
- North Caldwell, New Jersey
- Teterboro, New Jersey
- Teterboro Airport
- Newark Liberty International Airport
- Bridge Street Bridge between Newark and Harrison, New Jersey
- Satin Dolls in Lodi, New Jersey
- Verona, New Jersey
- Lodi, New Jersey
- Newark, New Jersey
- Clifton, New Jersey
