= Badalucco (surname) =

Badalucco is an Italian surname. Notable people with the surname include:

- Joseph Badalucco Jr., American actor, brother of Michael
- Michael Badalucco (born 1954), American actor
- Nicola Badalucco (1929–2015), Italian screenwriter
