= The Sopranos (The Sopranos episode) =

- The Sopranos episode
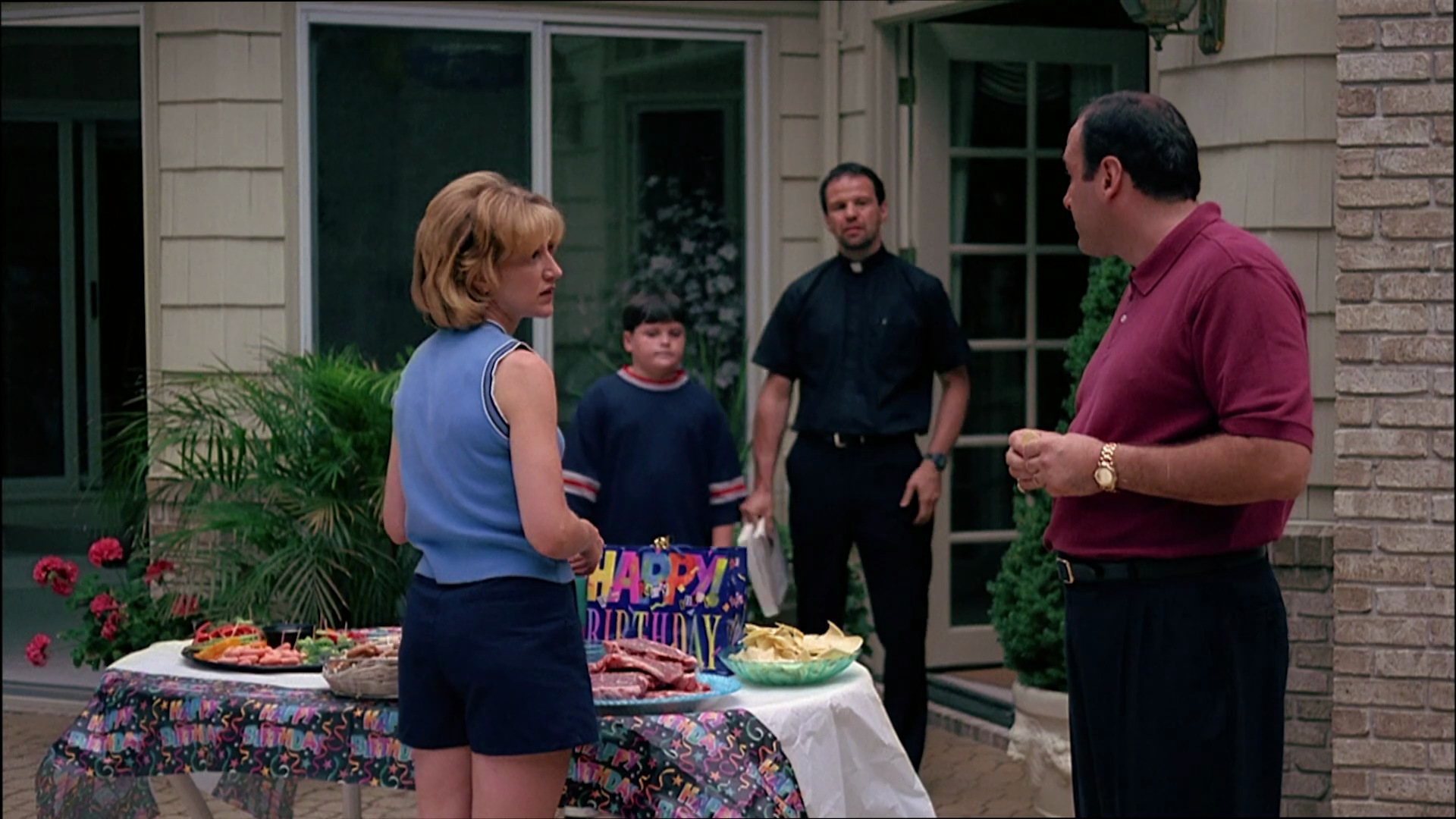
- The Sopranos having a birthday party for A.J.
- Episode no.: Season 1 Episode 1
- Directed by: David Chase
- Written by: David Chase
- Cinematography by: Alik Sakharov
- Editing by: Joanna Cappuccilli
- Production code: S101
- Original air date: January 10, 1999
- Running time: 60 minutes

Guest appearances
- Jerry Adler as Hesh Rabkin; Alton Clinton as MRI Technician; Phil Coccioletti as Nils Borglund; Michele DeCesare as Hunter Scangarelo (as Michele de Cesare); Drea de Matteo as Hostess (Adriana La Cerva); Elaine del Valle as Sandrine; Giuseppe Delipiano as Giuseppe; Siberia Federico as Irina Peltsin; Michael Gaston as Alex Mahaffey; Joe Lisi as Dick Barone; Justine Miceli as Nursing Home Director; Kathrine Narducci as Charmaine Bucco; Joe Pucillo as Beppy Scerbo; Michael Santoro as Father Phil Intintola; Bruce Smolanoff as Emil Kolar; John Ventimiglia as Artie Bucco

Episode chronology
← Previous —	Next → "46 Long"
- The Sopranos season 1

"The Sopranos", also known as "Pilot", is the pilot episode of the HBO television drama series The Sopranos, premiering on January 10, 1999. It was written and directed by the series creator and executive producer, David Chase.

== Synopsis ==
In June 1998, North Jersey mobster Anthony "Tony" Soprano, a captain in the DiMeo crime family, is referred to a psychiatrist, Dr. Jennifer Melfi, after having a panic attack. Tony tells Melfi he is a waste management consultant, but she hints that she knows what he actually does. After Melfi establishes what will and will not fall under doctor-patient confidentiality, Tony begins to partly open up.

Tony has recently been dealing with tensions between his wife Carmela and teenage daughter Meadow, as well as trying to keep his impulsive nephew, Christopher Moltisanti, in check. When a Czech-American criminal organization is bidding against Tony for a waste management contract, Christopher unilaterally murders one of the Czechs, Emil Kolar, resulting in the Czechs withdrawing their bid. Corrado "Junior" Soprano, Tony's uncle, resents his nephew's rise in the family hierarchy while he himself is in decline.

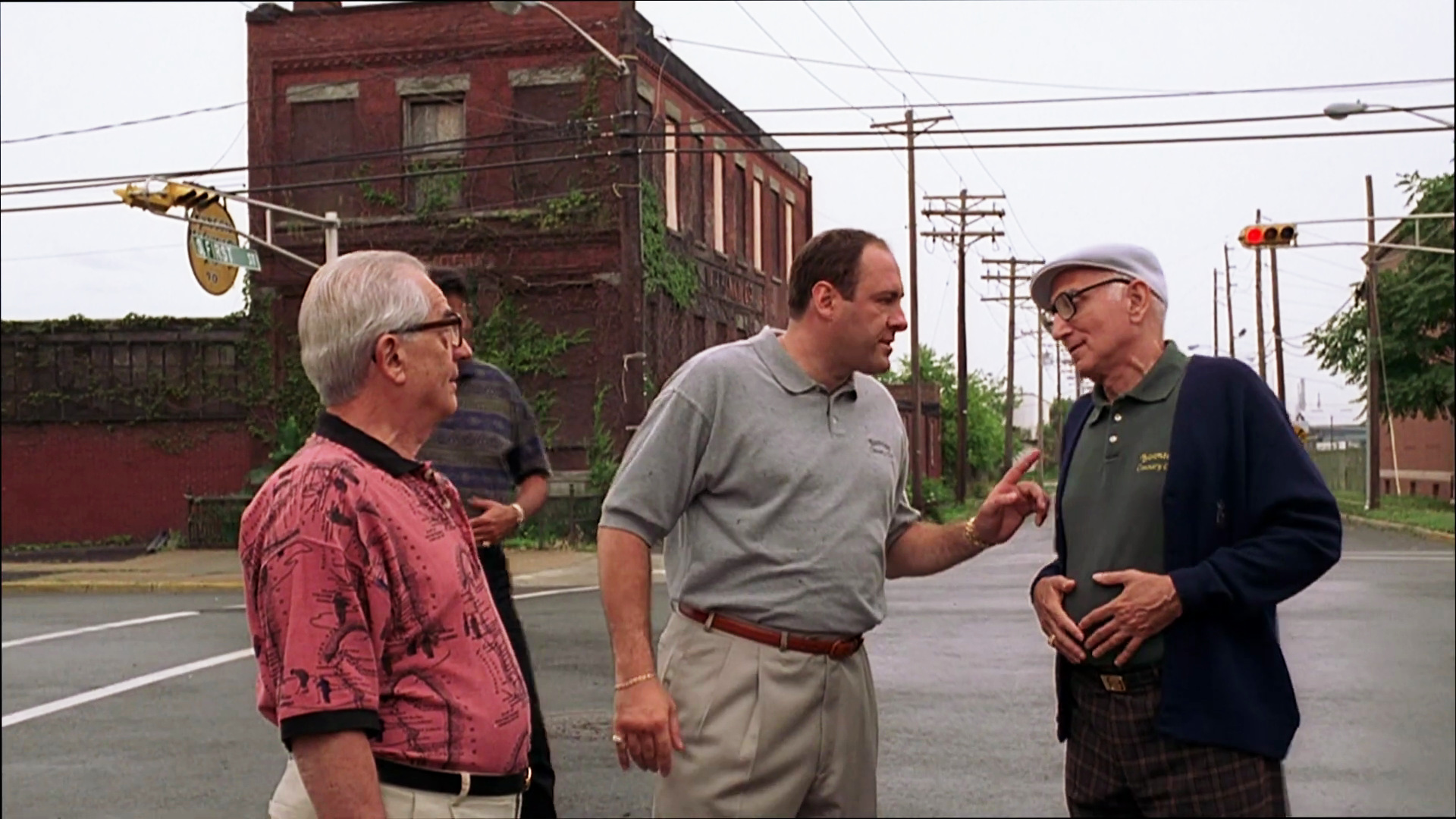
Tony and Junior Soprano arguing

Junior wants to kill turncoat "Little Pussy" Malanga in a restaurant he frequents, owned by Tony's lifelong friend Artie Bucco. Thinking the murder would ruin the restaurant, Tony unsuccessfully tries to persuade Junior to carry out the hit at a different location. He then tries to get Artie to close the restaurant for three weeks by offering cruise tickets, but his wife Charmaine refuses them. Finally, Tony has his right-hand man Silvio Dante bomb the restaurant; Artie's reputation will not be damaged, and he will be able to claim insurance compensation.

Alex Mahaffey, an HMO employee and "degenerate gambler", is in debt to Tony and Hesh Rabkin, an old Jewish associate of Tony's late father. While driving with Christopher, Tony spots Mahaffey and runs him down, breaking his leg. He then concocts a scheme to have Mahaffey's company make phony insurance claims payable to non-existent clinics in order to pay off his debts, with which Mahaffey is forced to comply.

Tony has a strained relationship with his elderly mother, Livia, who is resisting his advice to move into a retirement home. A confrontation with Livia triggers another panic attack, causing Tony to return to Melfi. He tells her about a family of ducks that had been living in his swimming pool but left when the ducklings fledged. Guided by Melfi, Tony realizes he is sad to see the ducks go because he dreads losing his own family; to his consternation, this makes him cry.

At a birthday party for Tony's adolescent son A.J., Christopher, frustrated about not receiving recognition for killing Kolar, tells Tony he is thinking of turning his life story into a Hollywood script, which Tony angrily forbids. Meanwhile, while driving Livia to the party, an embittered Junior says, "Something may have to be done about Tony." Livia does not say anything but shows a hint of a smile.

== Deceased ==
Emil Kolar: Shot in the back of the head by Christopher Moltisanti

== Cast ==
- James Gandolfini as Tony Soprano
- Lorraine Bracco as Dr. Jennifer Melfi
- Edie Falco as Carmela Soprano
- Michael Imperioli as Christopher Moltisanti
- Dominic Chianese as Corrado Soprano, Jr.
- Vincent Pastore as Pussy Bonpensiero
- Steven Van Zandt as Silvio Dante
- Tony Sirico as Paulie Gualtieri
- Robert Iler as Anthony Soprano, Jr.
- Jamie-Lynn Sigler as Meadow Soprano
- Nancy Marchand as Livia Soprano

== Guest starring ==
- Joe Lisi as Dick Barone
- John Ventimiglia as Artie Bucco
- Michael Gaston as Alex Mahaffey
- Jerry Adler as Hesh Rabkin
- Phil Coccioletti as Nils Borglund
- Michele DeCesare as Hunter Scangarelo
- Drea de Matteo as Restaurant Attendant
- Elaine Del Valle as Sandrine
- Siberia Federico as Irina Peltsin
- Alton Clinton as MRI Technician
- Giuseppe Delipiano as Restaurant Owner
- Justine Miceli as Nursing Home Director
- Kathrine Narducci as Charmaine Bucco
- Joe Pucillo as Beppy
- Michael Santoro as Father Phil Intintola
- Bruce Smolanoff as Emil Kolar
- Phil Coccioletti as Nils Borglund
- Vito Picone as Vito
- Craig Zucchero as Uncle Junior’s Bodyguard

== Production ==
This wasn't four pretty women in Manhattan. This was a bunch of fat guys from Jersey. It was an incredible leap of faith.

— James Gandolfini drawing a contrast between the pilot and Sex and the City

Pre-production for the pilot commenced in the summer of 1997, a year and a half before The Sopranos debuted on television. The episode was shot in August and completed by October of that year. Despite being well received by his closest friends and the cast and crew who watched it, David Chase feared the pilot would not be picked up by HBO and, in that case, planned to ask the network for additional funds to shoot another forty-five minutes and turn it into a feature film. Chase was also pressured by another, completely new development deal offered to him by another network, which he kept postponing until he heard HBO's verdict on The Sopranos. Shortly before Christmas of 1997, Chase learned that HBO liked the pilot and ordered a full season, all of which happened about two hours before the deadline for accepting the other network's deal. Chase was relieved as if "let out of jail. It was like a reprieve from the governor." "The Sopranos" is the first of only two episodes directed by Chase. The other is "Made in America", the series finale. Although this episode is titled "The Sopranos" on the VHS, DVD, Blu-ray and reruns on A&E, it was referred to as "Pilot" when originally aired.

During the year-long break between the pilot and the start of the shoot of the other twelve episodes of the first season, James Gandolfini gained sixty pounds for the role of Tony and underwent voice coaching. In the pilot, Siberia Federico and Michael Santoro play Irina and Father Phil respectively. For future episodes, these roles were recast with Oksana Lada and Paul Schulze. Drea de Matteo was originally simply cast as a restaurant hostess for this one episode only. However, the filmmakers liked her performance, and her character was developed into the role of Adriana La Cerva in future episodes. The pork store used as a meeting place is Centanni's Meat Market, a real butcher shop in Elizabeth, New Jersey. However, because the shop had a steady business and because local business owners were annoyed with the incidental effects of having a television production being shot on a weekly basis, HBO acquired an abandoned auto parts store in Kearny, which became Satriale's Pork Store for use in future episodes.

== Awards ==
Chase won the Directors Guild of America Award for Outstanding Directing – Drama Series for his work on this episode. Joanna Cappucilli won a Primetime Emmy Award for Outstanding Single-Camera Picture Editing for a Drama Series. It was also Emmy-nominated for Outstanding Directing for a Drama Series and Outstanding Writing for a Drama Series for Chase. Gandolfini and Nancy Marchand submitted this episode for the Primetime Emmy Award for Outstanding Lead Actor in a Drama Series and Primetime Emmy Award for Outstanding Supporting Actress in a Drama Series, respectively. Marchand additionally submitted the next episode, "46 Long."
