= Tony Caso =

American singer

Tony Caso (Anthony Caso) is an American 1980s pop/dance music recording artist.

== Career ==
Tony Caso began recording in the early 1980s, as Tony Caso and Salvation. His first single, "I Want To Dance With You" was issued on Lam Records in 1981. A second single, "Hot Blooded Woman", was also issued in 1981.

Tony joined the Bobby O label in New York, recording in One Two Three and Waterfont Home. He had a number of singles throughout the 1980s:

All The Love In My Heart – 1983 (O Records)
Take A Chance (On Me) – 1984 (O Records)
Dancing in Heaven – 1985 (Memo Records)
Motorcycle Madness – 1986 (Eurobeat Records)
Desperate & Dangerous – 1987 (Eurobeat Records)
Love Attack – 1987 (Eurobeat Records)
Run To Me – 1987 (Eurobeat Records)

In the mid 1980s Caso began moving from recording to acting. He has appeared in numerous commercials, television shows and movies including The Sopranos and Goodfellas.
