= Frank Santorelli =

American actor and stand-up comedian

- Occupations: Actor, stand-up comedian
- Years active: 1980s–present

Frank Santorelli is an American actor and stand-up comedian. He is best known for playing the recurring role of Georgie, the bartender at Bada Bing!, in the American crime drama television series The Sopranos.

Santorelli appeared in numerous television programs including Spin City, Spenser: For Hire (as a sniper), Andy Barker, P.I., Law & Order: Criminal Intent, The Job and Las Vegas. He also appeared in numerous films, including Meet the Parents, No Reservations, Crooked Lines, Meet the Mobsters and Somewhere in Queens.
