= Sal Ruffino =

American film and television actor

- Born: 1951 (age 74–75)
- Occupations: Film and television actor
- Years active: 1975–2004

Sal Ruffino (born 1951) is an American film and television actor. He is best known for playing the recurring role of Chucky Signore in the first season of the American crime drama television series The Sopranos.

Ruffino guest-starred in television programs including Matlock, In a Child's Name and The Young Indiana Jones Chronicles, and also in films such as Dog Day Afternoon (as an extra) Once Around, 29th Street, Super Mario Brothers (as a New York City policeman), Bandit: Beauty and the Beast and Stateside.
