= George Loros =

American actor and theatre director

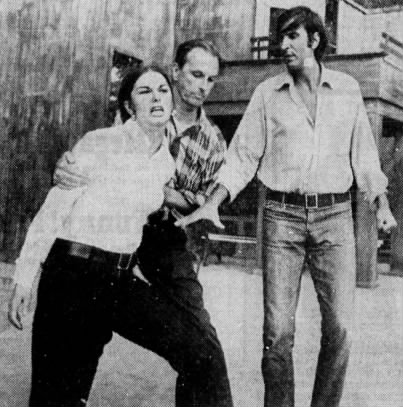
- Loros (right) with Samantha Doane and Charles Kissinger in Winter's Tale, 1968
- Born: George Kandiloros; January 9, 1934 (age 92); New York, U.S.
- Education: Hofstra University
- Occupations: Actor and theatre director

George Kandiloros (born January 9, 1934) is an American actor and theatre director. He is best known for playing the recurring role of Raymond Curto in the American crime drama television series The Sopranos.

== Life and career ==
Loros was born in New York. He is of Greek descent. He attended and graduated from Hofstra University. He began his stage career in the 1960s, playing numerous lead roles at the Pioneer Playhouse in Danville, Kentucky. During his stage career, he was a Shakespearean actor. In 1966, he appeared in the stage play Is Love Everything?, and in 1968, he starred as the clown in the stage play Winter's Tale, starring along with Diane Houghton and Samantha Doane. He then began his screen career in 1967, appearing in the film The Flim-Flam Man. In 1970, he played as Malcolm in the film Diary of a Mad Housewife.

Later in his career, Loros made his television debut in the ABC drama television series Nakia. He guest-starred in television programs including Kojak, Barney Miller, Starsky & Hutch, Baretta, The Six Million Dollar Man and The Rockford Files, and played the recurring role of Raymond Curto in the HBO crime drama television series The Sopranos. He also appeared in films such as Clean, Deadly Illusion, W. C. Fields and Me, The Gang That Couldn't Shoot Straight and Serpico. Aside from acting, he directed the Off-Broadway play The Petrified Forest in 2001.

Loros retired from acting in 2012, last appearing in the film Redemption.
