= Frank Renzulli =

American film actor, writer and producer

- Born: East Boston, Massachusetts, U.S.
- Occupations: Film actor, writer, producer
- Years active: 1984–present

Frank Renzulli is an American film actor, writer, and producer.

As an Emmy nominated writer and Golden Globe winner, Renzulli has written teleplays for The Sopranos, mainly in the first two seasons, and another Emmy nominated episode in the third season of the television show. He co-executive produced the short-lived 2006 television show Heist on NBC. He was a co-executive producer and writer for the Starz drama series Crash. Crash showrunner Glen Mazzara handpicked the writing staff for the series and selected people with a background of writing edgier material; Renzulli topped his list. In 2010, he played Sal LoNano, the real-life manager of "Irish" Micky Ward, in the Golden Globe- and Academy Award-nominated film The Fighter. Frank Renzulli had a recurring role as the private detective Vinnie Delgato on NBC's Harry's Law. He reunited with Glen Mazzara to write a freelance episode of AMC's The Walking Dead entitled "When the Dead Come Knocking" in 2012. The episode was critically acclaimed and considered one of the best of the ongoing series.

== Partial filmography ==
- Broadway Danny Rose (1984) as Joe Rispoli
- The Last Dragon (1985) as Hood #3
- The Hidden (1987) as Michael Buckley
- The Real Ghostbusters (1987-1990, TV Series) as Foul Grungie / Ghosts / Kids / Shifter / Calahan (voice)
- A Different World (1988, TV Series) as Enrico
- L.A. Law (1989, TV Series) as Dr. Romanelli
- Warlock (1989) as Cabbie
- Maverick Square (1990, TV Movie, writer)
- Wild Hearts Can't Be Broken (1991) as Mr. Slater
- Pros and Cons (1991, TV Series) as Frank the Coroner
- The Wonder Years (1992)
- The Adventures of Brisco County, Jr. (1993, TV Series) as Mr. Crocker
- My Father the Hero (1994) as Fred
- Where on Earth Is Carmen Sandiego? (1994, TV Series) (voice)
- Confessions of a Hitman (1994) as Vinnie
- Duckman (1994–1995, TV Series) as Roulette
- The Great Defender (1995, TV Series, writer)
- Charlie Grace (1995-1996, TV Series, writer)
- The Practice (1997, TV Series) as Kenny Tripp (also writer 1998–2004)
- That's Life (1998, TV Series, writer)
- The Sopranos (1999–2001, TV Series, writer)
- The Cactus Kid (2000)
- Russo (2000, writer)
- Hack (2002–2003, TV Series, writer)
- 10-8: Officers on Duty (2003-2004, TV Series, writer)
- Crossing Jordan (2005, TV Series) as Frank Lioso
- Heist (2006, TV Series, writer)
- Crash (2008, TV Series) as Mr. Famisham (uncredited) (also writer 2008–2009)
- The Fighter (2010) as Sal Lanano
- Harry's Law (2011, TV Series) as Vinnie Delgato
- The Walking Dead (2012, TV Series, writer)
- Ray Donovan (2014) as Mike Renzetti
- Scorpion (2016, TV Series) as Patrick Grady
- Damien (2016, TV Series) as Lieutenant Murnau
- The Poison Rose (2019) as Richard Gregory
- Beacon 23 (2024, TV Series) as Rocky
