= Jennifer Melfi =

Fictional character from The Sopranos

- The Sopranos character
- Lorraine Bracco as Jennifer Melfi
- First appearance: "The Sopranos" (1999)
- Last appearance: "The Blue Comet" (2007)
- Created by: David Chase
- Portrayed by: Lorraine Bracco

In-universe information
- Full name: Jennifer Melfi
- Nickname: Jen
- Gender: Female
- Title: Doctor
- Occupation: Psychiatrist
- Family: Joseph Melfi (father); Aida Melfi (mother); Unnamed sister
- Spouses: Richard LaPenna (divorced)
- Children: Jason LaPenna (son)
- Nationality: Italian-American

Dr. Jennifer Melfi is a fictional character on the HBO television series The Sopranos. She is the psychiatrist of Mafia boss Tony Soprano. She is portrayed by Lorraine Bracco.

== Character description ==
Melfi is an Italian-American, with her father's family hailing from Caserta. She is a graduate of Bard College and Tufts University School of Medicine and has an upscale lifestyle, living in a three-bedroom condominium in Essex Fells, New Jersey, and shopping frequently at gourmet Italian shops (as revealed in "Meadowlands").

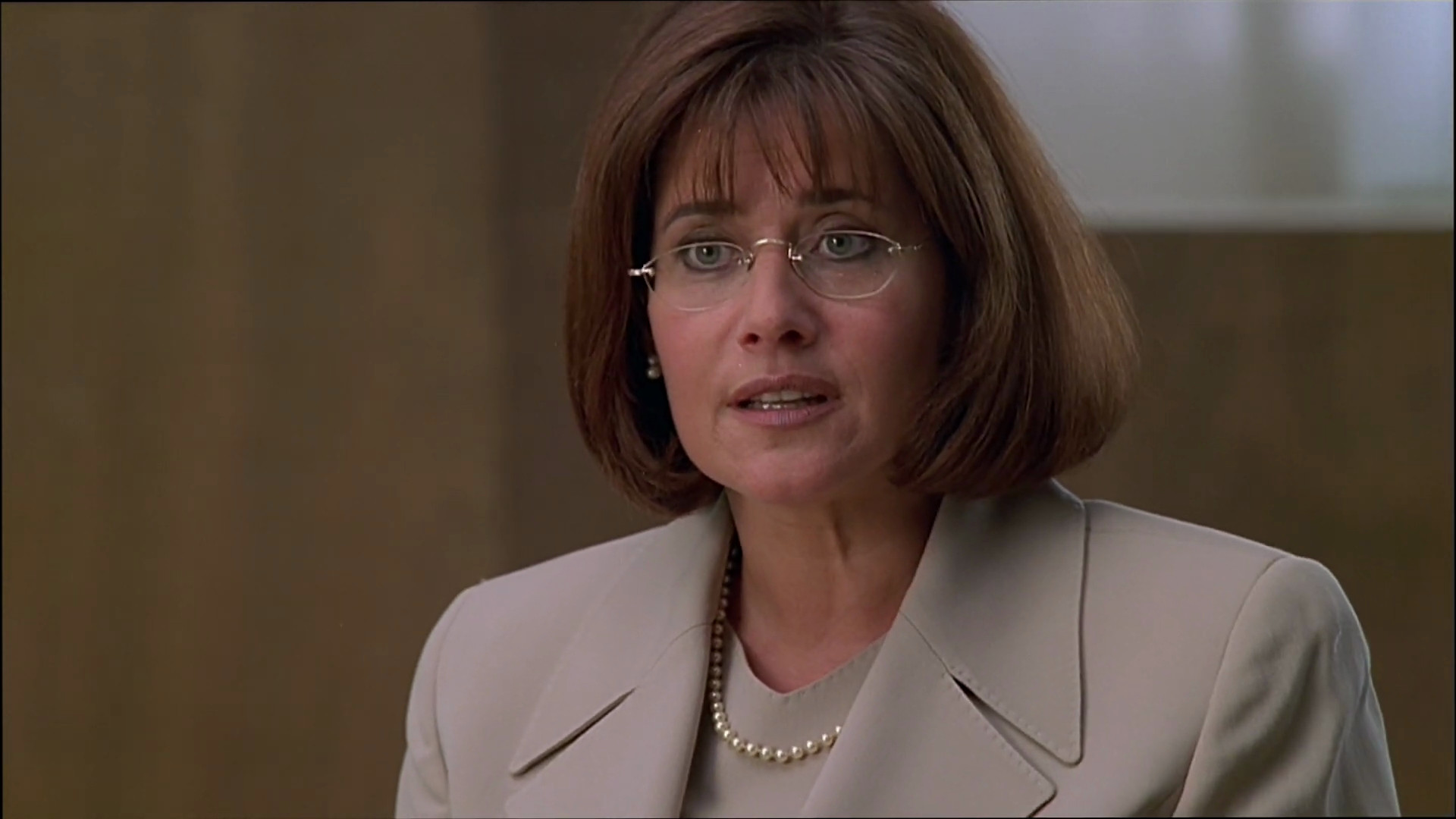
Melfi during season 1

At the start of the series, Tony Soprano, a local mobster, was referred to Melfi, a psychiatrist, after having a panic attack. He tells her he is a waste management consultant, but Melfi knows he is a mob boss. Throughout season 1, during the power struggle between Tony and Uncle Junior over who will be the boss, Junior informs Mikey "Grab Bag" Palmice that Tony is seeing a psychiatrist. This makes Junior, Mikey, and all other members of Junior's crew who were informed extremely angry and paranoid, for they fear Melfi could be potentially used as a witness to testify in court against the activities of the DiMeo crime family.

In the season 1 penultimate episode "Isabella", two hit men are sent by Junior and Mikey Palmice in an attempt to assassinate Tony for supposedly giving information to Melfi. The hit fails. One assailant is inadvertently killed by the other while trying to shoot Tony in his driver's seat from the passenger side after Tony grabs the first assassin's gun. Tony throws the other hit man off onto the road, not killing, but injuring him. Tony laughs ecstatically but has taken his eyes off the road long enough to crash his SUV into a parked car, knocking him unconscious.

Tony later informs Melfi that his enemies are aware of their therapy sessions, and she must go into hiding to avoid getting killed until everything blows over. To save his own life and Melfi's, Junior's top lieutenants Mikey Palmice and Chucky Signore are killed, the latter by Tony himself. Junior is only saved by being arrested by the FBI on racketeering charges. In the season 2 premiere episode "Guy Walks into a Psychiatrist's Office...", Melfi is shown doing business and living in a small roadside motel in Wayne, New Jersey, telling her patients her office is being remodeled. After the last troublesome member of Junior's crew, Philly "Spoons" Parisi, is murdered, Tony informs Melfi that "it's over" and that she can go back to her normal life.

In the season 3 episode "Employee of the Month", Melfi is walking alone through the parking garage to her car when she is attacked by a man. He grabs her from behind and after she attempts to escape and cries out for help, proceeds to drag her to the stairway of her building, where he violently rapes her. He leaves her lying helpless in the stairway, crying. At the hospital, she is visited by her ex-husband, Richard. Although her rapist is arrested, he is subsequently released because the chain of custody is lost by the police.

This infuriates Melfi, in shock that he was released. She comments to her psychiatrist and colleague Elliot Kupferberg, "I could have that asshole squashed like a bug," meaning that she could easily have her rapist killed by telling Tony that she was raped. She also inadvertently reveals to Kupferberg that the patient she is treating is Tony Soprano. More shock comes when Melfi is in the fast-food restaurant where the rapist works. She sees his smiling picture on the wall as Employee of the Month (hence the episode title).

Melfi herself feels a crazed desire for revenge and knows that a word to Tony Soprano would obtain it, but, like her ex-husband, she will obey the social contract. Later, Dr. Melfi has a dream. She buys a soda from a vending machine; when she reaches into the machine to get it, her hand is trapped inside. A Rottweiler appears and terrifies her. Then the rapist advances toward her. The dog turns and mauls the rapist, who cries in agony. With Kupferberg, she understands the meaning: the dog is Tony Soprano taking revenge on her behalf. Kupferberg implores her to not seek retribution from Tony Soprano, Melfi is shown to be affected by Tony's sessions, during a dinner with her son, she throws wine on a woman smoking after politely asking for her to put out the cigarette.

She tells Tony and others she has been in a car accident. When he sees her, Tony is shocked and concerned by her injuries. He tells her he is now ready to see a behaviorist. She says, "No," and starts crying. He goes to her, lays his hands gently on her, and asks what is the matter. She composes herself and asks him to return to his seat. He goes back, but asks, "What? You wanna say something?" After a tense pause, she says, "No."

Melfi sees Dr. Kupferberg on a regular basis. In "The Second Coming", he tells her that a recent study has shown that talk therapy may only help a sociopath become more sociopathic. Elliot has commented that treating Tony Soprano gives her a "vicarious thrill". Melfi tells Elliott she used to find Tony attractive at first, but no longer. She does not mention that shortly before this session, she had an erotic dream about herself and Tony.

Tony attempts to ask her out after his separation from Carmella, but is politely rebuffed, angering him to the point where he insults her, causing a brief falling out. After Tony is shot and hospitalised by Uncle Junior, Melfi runs into Carmella, while she is shopping and offers to provide a sympathetic ear. Which she is eventually taken up on, Tony eventually recovers and Melfi helps him deal with his feelings about Christopher's film. Where the character who is a boss is obviously based on him, with scenes alluding to his falsely rumoured affair with Adrianna.

Melfi attends a dinner party with Elliot and other colleagues, but the conversation turns to the recent study claiming sociopaths take advantage of talk therapy. Kupferberg angers and shocks her by revealing to all present that Tony Soprano is her patient. However, she reads the study at home and is convinced of its findings. At his next session Tony is relaxed, while her responses become sarcastic and aggressive. When she says she intends to cease treating him, he is taken aback and hurt: "We're making progress! It's been seven years!" She says, "You don't give a shit about commitments, about what I do." She also criticises him for defacing the magazines and reading material she leaves for waiting patients, which he has done before, waits for him to go, then closes the door on him.

== Character origins ==
David Chase modeled the character of Jennifer Melfi after his own psychiatrist. Bracco played the wife of a mobster in Goodfellas (1990) and she was originally asked to play the role of Carmela Soprano. She took the role of Jennifer Melfi instead because she wanted to try something different and felt that the part of the highly educated Dr. Melfi would be more of a challenge for her.
