= Joseph Badalucco Jr. =

American actor (active 1977–2017)

- Born: Brooklyn, New York, U.S.
- Occupation: Actor
- Years active: Scenography crafts 1977–2016; Actor 1992–2017
- Relatives: Michael Badalucco (brother)

Joseph Badalucco Jr. (born 1959/1960). is an American set dresser and property master who later added an overlapping career as an actor, best known for portraying Jimmy Altieri on The Sopranos, and Detective "Jelly" Grimaldi on Third Watch.

== Career ==
Badalucco began his career as a carpenter on film sets in the late-1970s, working on Woody Allen films including Annie Hall, Manhattan, Interiors. His work extended into set dresser, first on Stardust Memories, then into props and later property master, such as The Godfather Part III and The Good Shepherd.

After becoming an actor in the 1990s, he had minor film roles in Godzilla and The Siege. On television, he had recurring roles as Jimmy Altieri on The Sopranos, and Detective "Jelly" Grimaldi on Third Watch.

== Filmography (actor) ==
=== Film ===
Year	Title	Role
1992	Whispers in the Dark	Undercover Cop
1996	Ransom	Liquor Store Cop
1998	Godzilla	Forklift Driver
1998	The Siege	EMT
2002	Unfaithful	Train conductor
2002	Two Weeks Notice	Construction Foreman
2004	Kinsey	Radio Repairman
2008	Ghost Town	Accident Bystander
2009	The Invention of Lying	Blue Collar Guy

=== Television ===
Year	Title	Role	Notes
1999–2001	The Sopranos	Jimmy Altieri	Recurring role (season 1), guest (season 3)
2004–2005	Third Watch	Jelly Grimaldi	Recurring role (seasons 4–6)
2007	The Black Donnellys	Joey Badaluce	Episode: "When the Door Opens"
2009	Life on Mars	Carbone	Episode: "Take a Look at the Lawmen"
2013	Zero Hour	Lance	Episode: "Escapement"
2014	Black Box	Eddie	Episode: "Who Are You?"
2016	The Night Of	Detective	3 episodes
2017	The Path	Bank Manager	Episode: "Oz"
