= Livia Soprano =

Fictional character from The Sopranos

- The Sopranos character
- Nancy Marchand as Livia Soprano
- First appearance: "The Sopranos" (1999)
- Last appearance: The Many Saints of Newark (2021)
- Created by: David Chase
- Portrayed by: Nancy Marchand; Laila Robins (flashbacks); Laurie Williams (flashbacks); Vera Farmiga (The Many Saints of Newark)

In-universe information
- Occupation: Homemaker
- Family: Augie Pollio (father); Teresa Pollio (mother); Quintina Blundetto (sister); Gemma Pollio (sister); Settimia Pollio (sister, deceased); Mickey Pollio (brother, deceased)
- Spouses: Giovanni "Johnny" Soprano (deceased)
- Children: Janice Soprano; Tony Soprano; Barbara Soprano Giglione
- Relatives: Harpo (grandson); Domenica Baccalieri (granddaughter); A.J. Soprano (grandson); Meadow Soprano (granddaughter); Thomas Giglione III (grandson); Alyssa Giglione (granddaughter); Tony Blundetto (nephew); Cakey Pollio (cousin)
- Nationality: Italian-American

Livia Soprano (née Pollio), portrayed by Nancy Marchand, is a fictional character on the HBO TV series The Sopranos. She is the mother of Tony Soprano. A young Livia, played by Laila Robins and later by Laurie J. Williams, is sometimes seen in flashbacks. Series creator David Chase has stated that the main inspiration for the character was his own mother. Vera Farmiga portrays a young Livia Soprano in the 2021 prequel film, The Many Saints of Newark.

In 2016, Rolling Stone ranked her #3 of their "40 Greatest TV Villains of All Time".

== Character biography ==
Livia Pollio was born in Providence, Rhode Island to Teresa and Vito Faustino "Augie" Pollio, Italian immigrants from Avellino. Livia's childhood was poverty-stricken and miserable and her marriage to the tough and charismatic Johnny Soprano was Livia's ticket out of her parents' house. Together they had three children: Janice, Tony, and Barbara. She also suffered a miscarriage years after her youngest child was born and almost died from heavy bleeding. Life as a housewife was unfulfilling for Livia and she felt overwhelmed by her three children and unappreciated by her unfaithful husband. Once, while driving home from the Copacabana her husband shot her through her beehive hairdo. She liked listening to Connie Francis and The Pajama Game when she was younger.

Cagey, manipulative, and self-absorbed, Livia Soprano seemingly derives little pleasure from life other than making the people around her miserable. On her son's wedding day, she told her new daughter-in-law Carmela that marrying Tony was a mistake and eventually Tony would get bored with her. Her older daughter Janice moved to the West Coast when she was 18 and her younger daughter Barbara married into a successful family in New York. This left Tony with the sole responsibility of looking after Livia following Johnny's death. As she gets older, her misery and mental state worsen. Dr. Melfi believes Livia has undiagnosed borderline personality disorder.

Years later on season one of the show, Livia causes problems for Tony as revenge for putting her in a retirement home, Green Grove, and putting her house up for sale. This results in Tony almost being killed on two occasions. Tony narrowly avoids two hitmen after Junior Soprano finds out from Livia that Tony was subverting his power. Tony's best friend Artie Bucco draws a rifle on Tony after Livia reveals that he burned down his restaurant. Tony is able to convince him otherwise and Artie smashes his gun in frustration.

It is later discovered that the FBI had bugged Livia's retirement home, and the recordings of Livia conspiring with Junior are played for Tony. Tony's plot for revenge is foiled when Livia suffers a stroke (said to be induced by repressed rage) and is taken into a hospital. Tony appears to be ready to smother her with a pillow, but she is rushed to the emergency room. He then publicly threatens to kill her, informing her that he had heard her conspiring with Junior from the FBI. However, Tony settles for cutting off all contact with her.

In season two, Livia's daughter Janice returns to New Jersey. She takes up residence in Livia's home and convinces Tony not to sell the house and instead let her take care of Livia. Livia is cautious of Janice's sudden concern for her well-being and correctly guesses that Janice has ulterior motives. While Tony and Carmela avoid all contact with Livia, her grandchildren Meadow and A.J. still visit her, unaware of past events. Livia grows paranoid and more difficult when AJ inadvertently reveals to her that Janice and Tony were discussing possible "do not resuscitate" options for her. When Janice is forced to flee the state, Tony gives Livia a stolen plane ticket so she can stay with her sister. However, before she is set to leave, she is detained at the airport.

Tony hires a home assistant to look after Livia at the beginning of season three. Livia dies soon after from another stroke. After her death, Janice discovers that Livia kept many of Tony's old childhood artifacts while only keeping some of Barbara's and none of Janice's. Livia appears as a younger woman in several flashbacks afterward, as well as being frequently referenced, with Tony still far from resolving his feelings towards her.

For season three, a storyline was planned where Livia would be called to testify against her son in court, giving evidence on stolen airline tickets she had received from him, but Marchand died on June 18, 2000, before it could be filmed. Existing footage and computer-generated imagery was used to create a final scene between Tony and Livia in the season three episode "Proshai, Livushka" before the character, too, died. The cost was approximately $250,000.

During the sixth-season episode "Mayham" when Tony is comatose from a gunshot wound, he has a vivid dream that ends with Tony being beckoned into a house by his dead cousin Tony Blundetto; a woman who looks similar to Livia can briefly be seen in the doorway of the house. Tony then hears a child's voice calling "Daddy, don't go, come back." He then awakens to see his daughter Meadow and wife Carmela standing over him.

== Character origins ==
David Chase based Livia on his own mother, Norma Chase. He described his mother as paranoid, abusive, sharp-tongued and dismissive of her son's career achievements. Many of Livia's memorable lines such as "Poor you," "Daughters are better at taking care of their mothers than sons," and "Another toothpick" are direct quotations of Norma Chase. Like Tony Soprano, David Chase spent years in psychotherapy addressing the consequences of her mothering.

Chase has also spoken highly of Robert Graves' 1934 novel I, Claudius, calling it one of his favorite works of fiction. While Chase has stopped short of drawing a direct connection, claiming he used the name of an aunt, many have compared the manipulative Livia Soprano to Claudius's grandmother Livia Drusilla. These suspicions tend to find confirmation in the maiden name Chase selected for Livia—Pollio, one shared by Gaius Asinius Pollio, who makes a decisive appearance in I, Claudius.
