= A.J. Soprano =

Fictional character from The Sopranos

- The Sopranos character
- Robert Iler as A. J. Soprano
- First appearance: "The Sopranos" (1999)
- Last appearance: "Made in America" (2007)
- Created by: David Chase
- Portrayed by: Robert Iler

In-universe information
- Full name: Anthony John Soprano Jr.
- Aliases: A.J. "Baby Bing" (FBI code name) Prince Albert (Tony & Carmela often refer to him as such); Tony Soprano Jr. Anthony Jr. Abraham Van Helsing "Googootz"
- Occupation: Assistant film producer Formerly: Pizza shop manager Construction worker Blockbuster cashier Ramapo College freshman student
- Family: Tony Soprano (father); Carmela Soprano (mother); Meadow Soprano (sister); Johnny Soprano (paternal grandfather); Livia Soprano (paternal grandmother); Hugh De Angelis (maternal grandfather); Mary De Angelis (maternal grandmother); Janice Soprano (paternal aunt); Barbara Soprano Giglione (paternal aunt); Junior Soprano (paternal great-uncle); Erecole Soprano (paternal great-uncle); Dickie Moltisanti (cousin once removed); Christopher Moltisanti (maternal cousin); Domenica Baccalieri (paternal cousin)
- Significant others: Rhiannon Flammer (girlfriend); Blanca Selgado (ex-fiancée); Devin Pillsbury (ex-girlfriend)
- Nationality: Italian-American

Anthony John Soprano Jr. is a fictional character on the HBO television series The Sopranos, portrayed by Robert Iler. He is the son of Carmela and Tony Soprano and the younger brother of Meadow Soprano.

== Biography ==
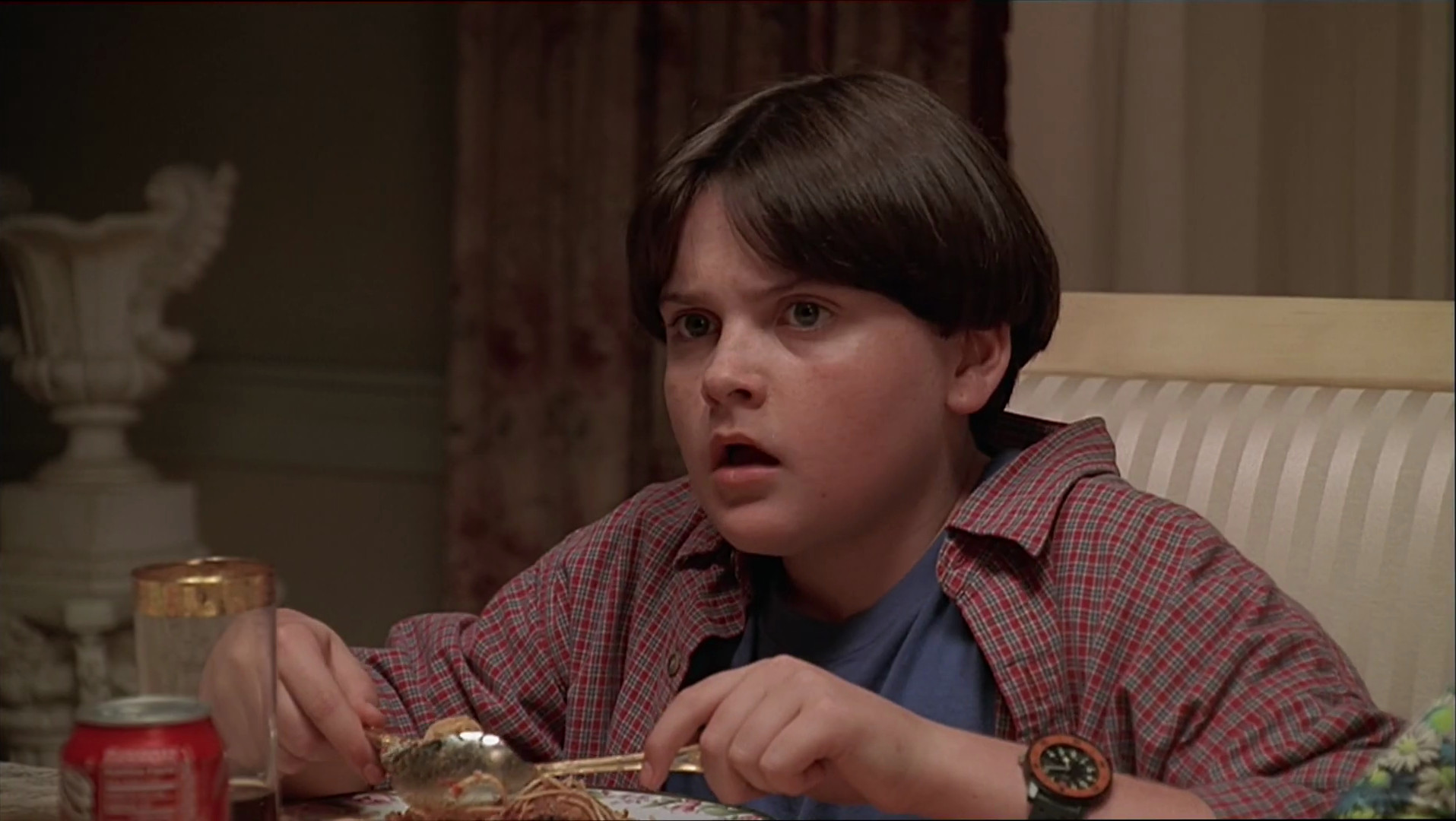
A.J. in season 1

Anthony was born July 15, 1986, and is the younger child of Tony and Carmela Soprano. Unlike his older sister, A.J. is a chronic underachiever with moderate self-esteem issues. During his high school years, he began developing a rebellious streak that leads him to crashing his mother's car, smoking marijuana at his own confirmation, getting drunk on stolen communion wine, vandalizing his school's swimming pool, and getting expelled from school after cheating on a test and arrested for stealing the answer sheets. Tony and Carmela decide to send A.J. to military school, but the plan is abandoned after A.J. suffers a panic attack.

In the episode "D-Girl", after reading The Stranger and Friedrich Nietzsche, A.J. states that "God is dead" and that he does not want to get confirmed. Despite his objections, he receives his confirmation. In the episode "Pie-O-My", he is heard listening to "The Gift That Keeps On Giving", a song about accepting the word of Satan, by Deicide, an anti-Christian Satanist death metal band that is named after deicide, the act of killing a god.

A.J. is a spoiled child. In the episode "Two Tonys", it is revealed that Tony bought him an elaborate $5,000 drum set. Additionally, in the episode "All Happy Families...", Tony buys him a Nissan Xterra as a "motivational tool". A.J. is excited about the SUV, however, he comments about the environmental impact of the car, and also states he may encounter social pressure from school friends to drive a different vehicle.

During the fifth season, A.J. shows an increasing amount of disrespect to his mother, presumably due to his parents' separation. He tends to relate better to his father, and ends up moving in with him during the separation. However, in the episode "Sentimental Education", A.J. and Tony get into a scuffle over A.J.'s lack of respect. A.J. soon decides he wants to move back in with his mother, threatening to call social services due to the ongoing "violence against children" present in his father's home. Carmela demands certain things from A.J. in return for allowing him to move back in (e.g., showing respect to his mother, not swearing, tending to schoolwork).

Frequently throughout the series, Tony and Carmela express concern about A.J.'s future. In the fifth season of the show, A.J. displays an interest in pursuing a career in event planning, but later derides his parents' mentions of it (e.g., in "Mr. & Mrs. John Sacrimoni Request...").

In "Full Leather Jacket", A.J. says that he wants to attend Harvard University or West Point for college. Tony dismisses the idea as unrealistic given A.J.'s poor academic performance. During season three, when Tony asks him about it at a family dinner, A.J. claims that he never said it, as he knows his grades wouldn't be good enough. Throughout season five, references are made to the unlikelihood of A.J.'s being admitted to a four-year university.

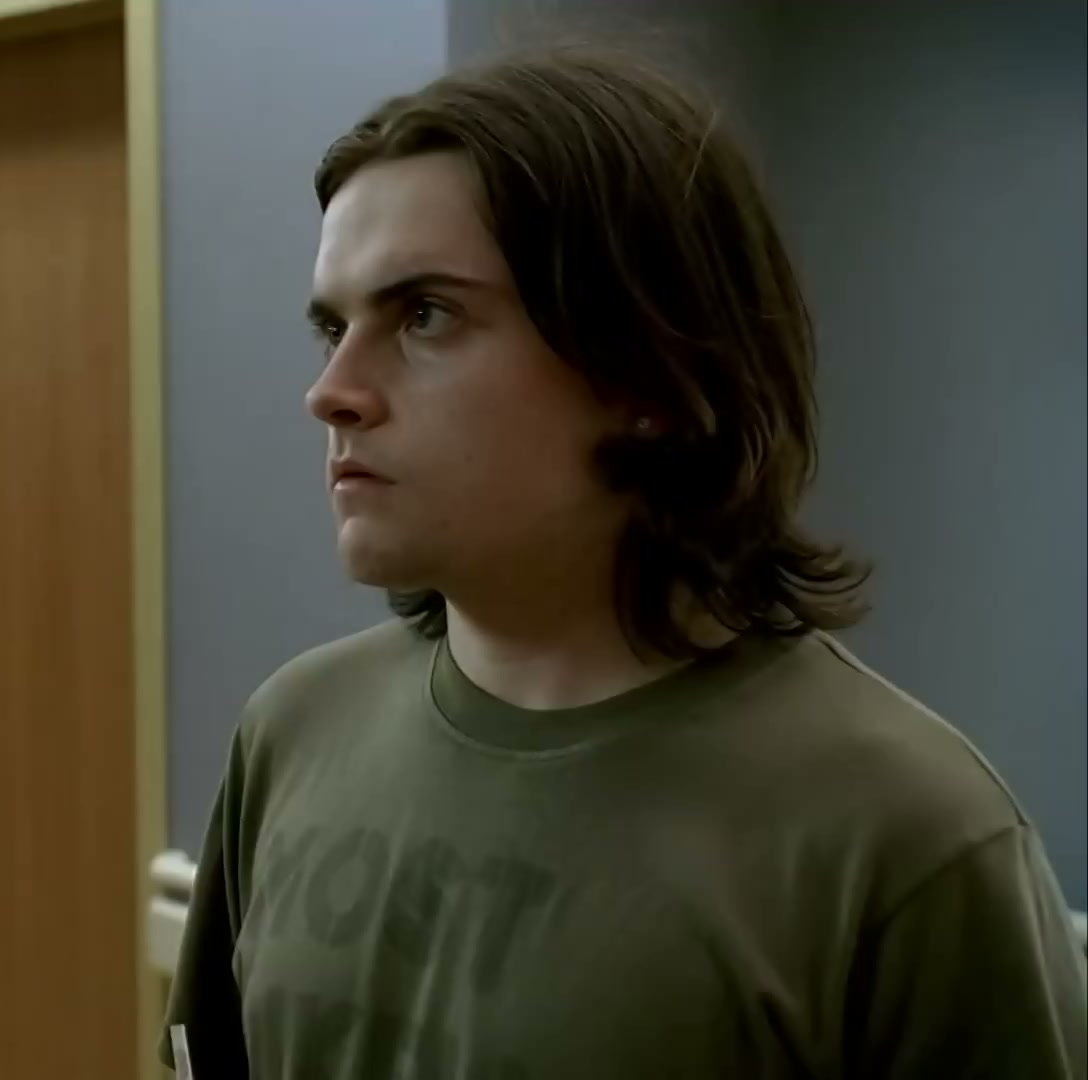
A.J. in season 6

In season 6A, A.J. admits to his parents that he has flunked out of the community college he was attending, a worrying parallel to Tony's own youth. After a senile Uncle Junior mistakes Tony for a mob foe he had already killed years earlier and shoots him, A.J. steals a large knife and goes to the institution where Junior is being held, in a futile effort to exact revenge for his father. He is arrested, but later released without charges thanks to his father's political connections. He delves deep into the New York City club scene and begins using cocaine.

A.J. gets a job working at Blockbuster, but is fired for selling discarded promotional material. After claiming to be searching for jobs on the Internet to no avail, Tony intervenes and arranges a construction job for his son. A.J. claims he cannot do it because he will be trying re-enrolling in community college, but Tony says that is not a problem as many of the men who work in construction are high school and college students. A.J. is reluctant to accept the job because of the early hours and outdoor work, which makes Tony angry, leading him to grab a football helmet and smashing the windshield of A.J.'s Xterra, warning A.J. not to test him. A.J. reluctantly works at the construction site where he meets Blanca Selgado, who he soon begins dating. Carmela disapproves of Blanca, who is Dominican, 10 years A.J.'s senior, and has a three-year-old son named Hector from a previous marriage. Tony is more approving of the relationship, commenting that at least Blanca is Catholic.

In season 6B, A.J. proposes to Blanca, telling her that he will own restaurants in a couple of years. However, Blanca soon gives the ring back and breaks up with him, leaving A.J. severely depressed. His father tries to cheer him up, encouraging him to move on.

A.J. quits his job at a pizza parlor. Tony forces him to attend a fraternity party with the college-age relatives of his fellow mafiosi. A.J. grudgingly attends, and soon starts to enjoy himself. Several of the boys run a sports betting operation at their college and after a night of drinking, they beat and torture a college student who neglected to pay them by pouring battery acid on his foot. A.J. joins in to help forget his relationship problems. Afterwards, A.J. is seen telling his psychiatrist that he is once again depressed, particularly about the Israeli–Palestinian conflict.

A.J.'s depression leads to a botched suicide attempt, wherein A.J. ties a cinder block to his leg with a too-long length of rope and attempts to drown himself in the pool at the Soprano home. Tony hears his cries for help and dives into the pool to rescue him. He is then placed in psychiatric care facility, where he reunites with Rhiannon, an ex-girlfriend of his former friend Hernan. After Tony tells him that his uncle Bobby has been shot dead, A.J. begins to cry and complain about how Bobby's death negatively affects him. Tony loses patience with him, violently dragging him out of bed and ordering him to pack as the family leaves home quickly to elude a possible attack by the Lupertazzi family.

In the final episode, A.J. is in his Nissan Xterra with Rhiannon, his new girlfriend, and starts making out with her, but they both rush out of the vehicle when it catches fire due to A.J.'s parking over a pile of leaves. After getting chewed out by Tony, A.J. decides to join the United States Army and begins vigorous training. This scares A.J.'s parents. Tony decides to sit down with A.J. and successfully talks him out of enlisting. Instead, Tony gets him a new BMW M3 and a job working for Little Carmine's film production company. The new job, paired with the possibility of opening his own nightclub, seems to alleviate A.J.'s depression. He is seen having dinner with his family at last.

In all seasons, A.J. is portrayed as a fan of heavy metal and nu metal, via product placements (shirts, coats, posters and stickers) of bands like Pantera, Nevermore, Mudvayne (whose concert he attends in the episode "All Happy Families"), Slipknot, Limp Bizkit, Coal Chamber, Marilyn Manson, Stuck Mojo, Machine Head, Soulfly and Fear Factory. By the end of the series, having grown more worldly and introspective, he discovers and begins analyzing the early work of Bob Dylan. Through various plot points and pieces of clothing, A.J. is identified as a fan of the New York Giants, New Jersey Devils and New York/New Jersey MetroStars.

== Analysis ==
Critics have found A.J. Soprano to exhibit behavior resulting from a lack of parental discipline. For Television Without Pity, Kim Reed described Soprano as having a "lack of work ethic" due to "overly permissive parenting". Reed also observed in 2007, "...AJ has caught plenty of breaks in his life, starting with being born to rich parents who give him pretty much anything he wants."

Reviewing the season five episode "Two Tonys" in 2004, New York Times critic Alessandra Stanley also considered A.J. to be a product of "spoiling" by his parents and likened a scene of his with another popular drama of the time: "A. J.'s sullen hostility to his mother is a chilling N.J. version of 'The O.C.'"
