= Meadow Soprano =

Fictional character from The Sopranos

- The Sopranos character
- Jamie-Lynn Sigler as Meadow Soprano
- First appearance: "The Sopranos" (1999)
- Last appearance: "Made in America" (2007)
- Created by: David Chase
- Portrayed by: Jamie-Lynn Sigler (credited as Jamie-Lynn DiScala in season 5)

In-universe information
- Full name: Meadow Mariangela Soprano
- Aliases: Princess Bing; Med; Miss Meadow; Queen of Mean
- Gender: Female
- Occupation: Columbia Law School student, The Legal Aid Society paralegal volunteer
- Family: Tony Soprano (father); Carmela Soprano (mother); A.J. Soprano (brother); Johnny Soprano (paternal grandfather); Livia Soprano (paternal grandmother); Hugh DeAngelis (maternal grandfather); Mary DeAngelis (maternal grandmother); Janice Soprano (paternal aunt); Barbara Soprano Giglione (paternal aunt); Junior Soprano (paternal great-uncle); Christopher Moltisanti (maternal cousin); Domenica Baccalieri (paternal cousin)
- Significant others: Noah Tannenbaum (ex-boyfriend); Jackie Aprile Jr. (ex-boyfriend); Finn DeTrolio (ex-fiancé); Patrick Parisi (fiancé)
- Nationality: Italian-American

Meadow Mariangela Soprano, portrayed by Jamie-Lynn Sigler, is a fictional character on the HBO TV series The Sopranos. In the early seasons, Meadow is introduced as a smart but spoiled partygoer, whose over-dramatic personality and tendency of living in a state of denial reveal a somewhat troubled upbringing. In the later seasons, her character developed with her understanding of the realities of life, money, politics, and relationships. Meadow's academic achievement and status as the source of pride for her parents forms a stark contrast to her brother A.J. Soprano.

In 1997, Sigler was cast as Meadow Soprano. When her manager first told her about the audition for The Sopranos, Sigler thought she would have to sing a soprano.

== Fictional biography ==
Born on September 13, 1982, Meadow is the first-born child of Tony, played by James Gandolfini, and Carmela Soprano, played by Edie Falco. She was active in extracurricular activities in high school, playing on the championship girls' soccer team, and singing in the chorus and school pageants. She became a member of the National Honor Society and attended Columbia University. Due to all these accomplishments and extracurriculars, she is praised by both Tony and Carmela which causes tension between her and her brother A.J. since she is clearly the favored child of Tony and Carmela.

After struggling through her first year at Columbia University, she volunteered regularly at the South Bronx Law Center. Her employment there added to the friction between Meadow and her father relating to race relations, specifically with regard to Tony's racist attitude towards Black people. After graduating, Meadow, who was interested in being a pediatrician, studied for medical school. She had second thoughts and later considered a career in the legal profession.

Meadow was often resentful of her lineage, stemming from a string of failed relationships, beginning with a fellow Columbia student named Noah Tannenbaum. This was followed by a romance with Jackie Aprile Jr., the son of Tony's deceased friend and fellow mobster, Jackie Aprile Sr. Meadow fell in love with Jackie Jr., but their temporary happiness together ended when he cheated on her and became increasingly involved in organized crime. Jackie ultimately organized a robbery involving a card game in which three men were killed and one was wounded.

After this incident, and following Tony's instructions to make a timely resolution to the matter, Ralph Cifaretto decided to kill Jackie Jr. As Jackie was exiting his hiding place, Vito Spatafore came up behind him and shot him in the back of the head, killing him instantly. The hit was publicized as a drug deal with African Americans gone bad, a story which Meadow publicly accepted, though she privately surmised that Jackie was killed by the mob.

Just before Jackie Jr.'s death, Meadow came to realize that he was unfaithful, but his death was nevertheless distressing. She initially blamed Tony for Jackie's involvement with crime and Carmela for standing by and supporting Tony. Unbeknownst to Meadow, it was Tony that had attempted to discourage Jackie's mafia aspirations, having promised Jackie Sr. to keep him away from crime.

During her teens, Meadow was both very aware and resentful of her father's criminal enterprise and her family's complicity therein. Meadow reconciled herself with these facts and her attitude strongly mirrored Tony's own. Publicly, she cited her father's position as a "waste management consultant," but in closer circles, she rationalized the Mafia as a cultural tradition borne out of discrimination against her ancestors' social and ethnic origins. Her life seemed further stabilized by her engagement to a Columbia dental student, Finn DeTrolio, of which her father approved. It was later revealed that Finn and Meadow broke off the engagement.

At the film premiere for Cleaver, Meadow reunited with Patrick Parisi, the son of Patsy Parisi, one of Tony's soldiers. Meadow and Patrick began seriously dating. Inspired by Patrick's passion for the law, Meadow decided to not apply to medical school and go to law school instead. She began to plan her wedding with Patrick.

In the series' final scene, she is shown outside the diner where she arrived late for meeting her family for dinner. She makes a number of efforts to parallel park before she succeeds and heads toward the diner. In the final shot of the series, Tony looks up after hearing the restaurant door open.

In Tony's coma, she is voiced by Morgan Saylor.
