= Carmela Soprano =

Fictional character on the TV series The Sopranos

- The Sopranos character
- Edie Falco as Carmela Soprano
- First appearance: "The Sopranos" (1999)
- Last appearance: The Many Saints of Newark (2021)
- Created by: David Chase
- Portrayed by: Edie Falco; Lauren DiMario (The Many Saints of Newark)

In-universe information
- Aliases: Carmela DeAngelis (née), "Carm", "Mel", Princess of Little Italy, and her FBI code name is Mrs. Bing, Ivana Trump
- Gender: Female
- Occupation: Housewife; real estate investor; day trader; committeeperson for annual Feast of St. Elzear in Newark, New Jersey; philanthropist
- Family: Hugh DeAngelis (father); Mary DeAngelis (mother); Unnamed sister Livia Soprano (mother-in-law); Giovanni Soprano (father-in-law; deceased); Janice Soprano (sister-in-law); Lena Moltisanti (aunt); Lenny DeAngelis (uncle); Febby DeAngelis (uncle); Barbara Giglione (sister-in-law); Dickie Moltisanti (cousin); Christopher Moltisanti (cousin once removed); Brian Cammarata (cousin); Unnamed cousin (deceased)
- Spouse: Tony Soprano
- Children: A.J. Soprano (son); Meadow Soprano (daughter)
- Religion: Roman Catholic
- Nationality: Italian-American

Carmela Soprano (née DeAngelis), played by Edie Falco, is a fictional character of the HBO crime drama television series The Sopranos. She is married to Mafia boss Tony Soprano. A young Carmela, portrayed by Lauren DiMario, appears in the 2021 prequel film, The Many Saints of Newark. She has conflicted feelings about her marriage and lifestyle.

Falco's performance as Carmela was universally lauded. She won three Emmy Awards for Outstanding Lead Actress in a Drama Series in 1999, 2001 and 2003, and received six nominations for her role in the series. Falco has also won three Actor Awards and two Golden Globes in the same category.

== Character biography ==
Carmela was Tony Soprano's high school sweetheart, and the couple married at a young age. They have two children together: Meadow Soprano and Anthony "A.J." Soprano, Jr. In the season 2 episode "The Knight in White Satin Armor", Tony mentions that they have been married for 18 years, suggesting they were married around 1981 or 1982. As a young adult, Carmela studied business at Montclair State University for an unspecified period of time. Carmela left college without graduating after becoming engaged to Tony and has a low awareness of intellectual topics, a fact which her high-achieving daughter Meadow sometimes mocks her for.

Carmela is a homemaker for the Soprano household, and works to create a semblance of legitimacy for her family, even though she is well aware their wealth is built on "blood money". Tony trusts Carmela enough to confide in her, to a degree, about some of his Mafia dealings, notably the failed attempt on his life and the death of Richie Aprile.

Carmela is an observant Roman Catholic and has difficulty rationalizing her husband's profession and the flaws in their marriage. Tony and Carmela often reconcile after Tony presents her with expensive gifts, notably jewelry, designer clothing, furs, cars, and a $600,000 plot of land she wants to build a spec house on.

Sometimes, Carmela has intense guilt for having sacrificed her children's security for the luxuries Tony's career could provide. She defends her children from Tony when they do something wrong. She has shown herself willing to use her mob-wife status to intimidate others, as she does in "Full Leather Jacket". In the episode, she overtly manipulates her neighbor's Georgetown-alumna sister into writing a letter of recommendation for Meadow to Georgetown, hoping Meadow would not go to UC Berkeley but rather stay closer to home. She discards a letter from Berkeley to Meadow requesting transcripts. Later, she retrieves it from the trash in a moment of guilt.

While she is very proud of Meadow's accomplishments and ambition, Carmela is also jealous and resentful of her daughter for achieving the independence and success she always wanted herself. She constantly frets over A.J.'s troubles and inactivity, yet tends to coddle him and is unwilling to impose any real restrictions on him. She has trouble with her husband's profession, considering him more a Robin Hood-like character and just another "crook" rather than a brutal murderer.

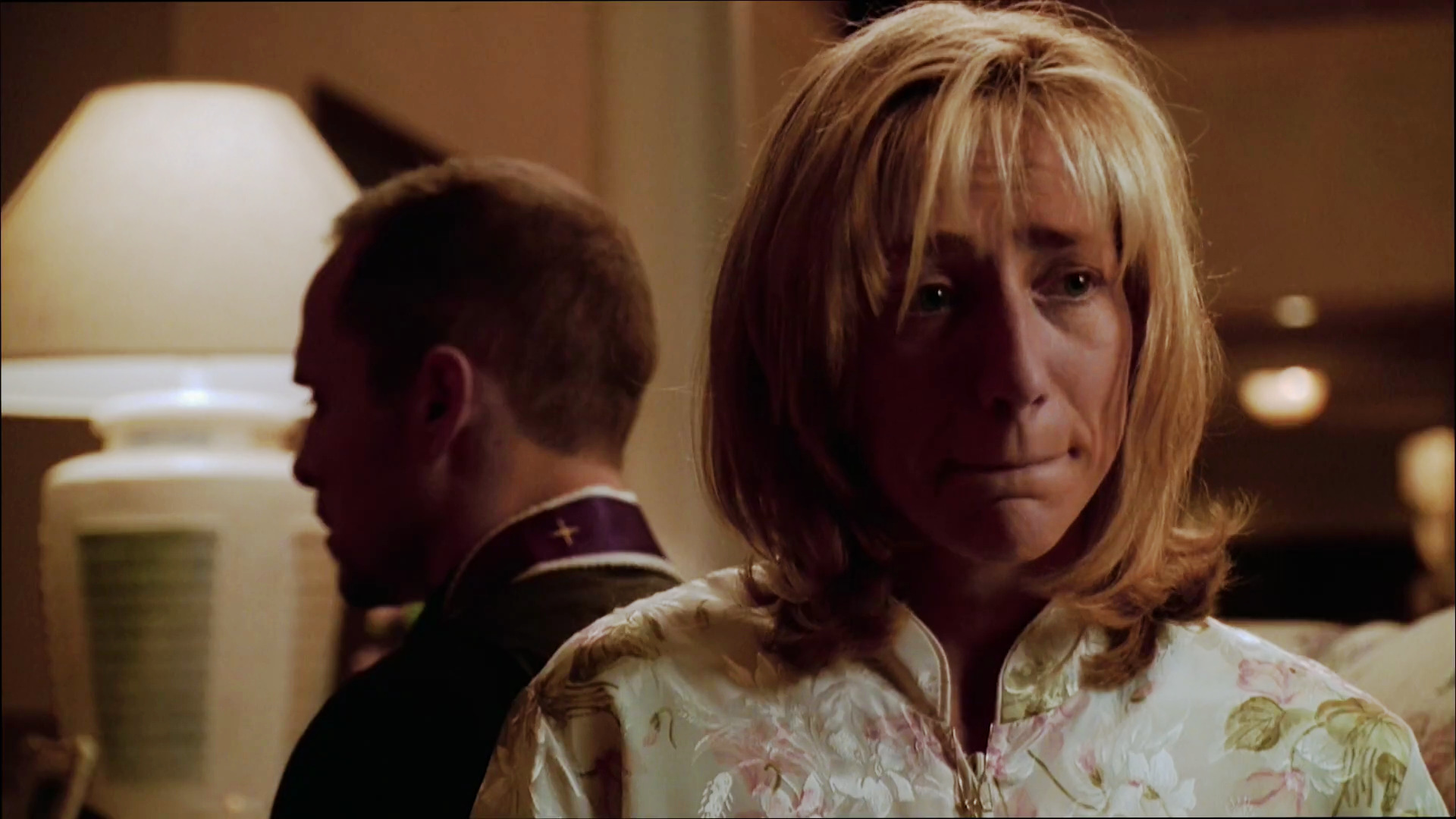
Carmela Soprano spending a night with Father Phil Intintola

Carmela's resentment of her husband's infidelity has often driven her to the brink of breaking her marriage vows during some sexually charged moments with her priest, Father Phil Intintola (in "College"), and painter-decorator Vic Musto. During the fourth season, Carmela has a mutual romantic infatuation with Furio Giunta. Tony had secured Furio from the Camorra clan while on an inaugural trip to Naples, the Soprano family's ancestral homeland, a trip that Carmela had wanted to be a part of.

Carmela reaches a low point with Tony's constant string of affairs and the two have a romantically tense but "arms-length" relationship for a period. Carmela and Furio each confide to separate friends that they are falling for each other. Furio is no longer able to bear the burden that the internal conflict between his feelings and his honor and respect for the “family” hierarchy is causing him. He sells his house and moves back to Italy. Carmela is devastated, and eventually revealed her feelings for Furio in an argument with Tony, to which Tony replies "If certain men see him, he's a dead man."

By the end of the fourth season, Tony and Carmela separate after Tony's former mistress Irina Peltsin calls the Soprano home, talks to A.J., and informs Carmela that Tony slept with Svetlana Kirilenko, Irina's cousin and the former nurse of Livia Soprano. Carmela begins dating A.J.'s guidance counselor, Robert Wegler. She pursues divorce proceedings against Tony, but is drawn back to her husband by financial concerns and difficulties in rearing A.J., as well as a difficult breakup with Wegler, who accuses Carmela of using sex to manipulate him into giving A.J. special treatment in school. Carmela complains to Hugh that she will always be known as the wife of a mob boss.

At the end of the fifth season, Carmela agrees to reunite with Tony after he agrees to purchase a $600,000 investment property in Montville, under Carmela's name, so she could build a spec house. Despite some initial awkwardness, the two are firmly reunited after Tony is shot by his uncle, Junior, both during his coma and after his hospital release. The crisis seems to have strengthened their bond.

Carmela's corrupt, materialistic nature is never far from the surface. After Tony surprises his delighted wife with a Porsche Cayenne Turbo, Carmela proceeds to flaunt her new SUV in front of Ginny Sack and Angie Bonpensiero, both of whom were reported to be having serious financial problems. Carmela is somewhat embarrassed when Angie admires Carmela's SUV and tells her that she recently purchased a Corvette with her own money, showing that Angie has achieved a certain level of financial independence and Carmela has not.

Carmela's own efforts to become financially independent have been less successful, as Tony neglects to intervene for a long period when an inspector determines that materials used on her spec house are not up to code, thereby halting construction and straining her relationship with her father, who was building the house with her. Tony later recants, and orders Silvio Dante to lean on the inspector to change his mind. Around this time, Carmela is concerned for the whereabouts of Adriana La Cerva, who seemingly had disappeared.

Carmela's concern intensifies when she encountered Adriana's mother, Liz La Cerva, at the Feast of St. Elzear (Episode 74, "The Ride"). Liz, who has stopped taking care of herself, tells Carmela that Adriana is dead, and that Christopher is responsible, going on to say the FBI told her so. The next day Carmela confronts Tony, who dismisses her: "Let me school you on domestic violence," he says. "First and foremost, there is always a body." Tony dismisses the concern and downplays suspicion at Christopher sarcastically saying "he isn't Scott Peterson".

Carmela is not aware that Adriana was a low-level informant for the FBI and that Christopher, who had learned this truth from Adriana herself, informed Tony, who in turn had her executed by Silvio (in "Long Term Parking"). She is unaware that Tony murdered Christopher after he had flipped off the highway in the SUV in which both were traveling (in "Kennedy and Heidi").

Carmela becomes greatly concerned for A.J. after he tries to commit suicide and is subsequently placed in the psychiatric ward at Mountainside Hospital. Carmela, along with Tony, encourages A.J. to become part of the production team for a film written by Daniel Baldwin and financed by Little Carmine, rather than enlist in the Army. She is shown considering building plans for a beach house. In the final scene of the series, she meets Tony at a diner for a family meal and eats onion rings with him and A.J.
