= Robert Iler =

American actor (born 1985)

- Iler in 2019
- Born: Robert Michael Iler; March 2, 1985 (age 41); New York City, New York, U.S.
- Occupations: Actor; poker player; podcast host
- Years active: 1995–2009, 2019–present

Robert Michael Iler (/ˈaɪlər/; born March 2, 1985) is an American actor. He is best known for his portrayal of A.J. Soprano on The Sopranos. His film roles include Tadpole (2002) and Daredevil (2003).

== Career ==
He made his debut in 1995 as one of the children featured in the music video for Dope Hat by Marilyn Manson. By mid-1997, Iler was appearing in commercials for Pizza Hut, and attending three or four auditions a week. He had also appeared on Saturday Night Live and in some film parts, but nothing that brought him great recognition. It was then that he won the role of A.J. Soprano, the son of series lead Tony Soprano, on the HBO drama The Sopranos, which aired from 1999 until 2007. By May 2001, he had begun home schooling for his education.

After the conclusion of The Sopranos in 2007, Iler largely retired from acting, instead moving to Las Vegas to pursue a career as a professional poker player.

In July 2023, Iler started a podcast with The Sopranos co-star Jamie-Lynn Sigler called Not Today Pal, produced by YMH studios owned by comedians Tom Segura and Christina Pazsitzky.

== Personal life ==
Iler struggled with substance abuse, particularly after The Sopranos ended. He has been sober since 2013.

In July 2001, Iler was arrested for the robbery of two teenagers in his Upper East Side neighborhood and for possession of marijuana. He pleaded guilty to a single charge of larceny and received three years' probation.

He was present on October 23, 2005, when the underground poker club Ace Point was raided by the police; however, no charges were filed against him.

== Filmography ==
=== Film ===
Year	Title	Role	Notes
1999	The Tic Code	Denny Harley	
2002	Tadpole	Charlie	
2003	Daredevil	Bully #1	

=== Television ===
Year	Title	Role	Notes
1999–2007	The Sopranos	A.J. Soprano	Main role
2001	Oz	Himself	Episode: "Famous Last Words"; Uncredited
2004	Law & Order: Special Victims Unit	Troy Linsky	Episode: "Mean"
2004	The Dead Zone	Derek Rankin	Episode: "Cycle of Violence"
2006	Four Kings	Rob	Main role
2009	Law & Order	Chad Klein	Episode: "Lucky Stiff"
2025–present	Bad Thoughts	Evan	Main role

== Awards and nominations ==
Year	Award	Work	Category	Result
1999	Screen Actors Guild Awards	The Sopranos	Outstanding Performance by an Ensemble in a Drama Series	Won
2007	Screen Actors Guild Awards	The Sopranos	Outstanding Performance by an Ensemble in a Drama Series	Won
