= List of rail trails in New Jersey =

Columbia Trail rail trail in Clinton Township

This list of rail trails in New Jersey lists former railroad right-of-ways in New Jersey that have been converted to trails for public use, as well as proposed rail trails.

== Established rail trails ==
- Atlantic County Bikeway - former Pennsylvania-Reading Seashore Lines; extends from the Shore Mall in Egg Harbor Township, near Garden State Parkway exit 36, to the Atlantic County Institute of Technology in Hamilton Township
- Barnegat Branch Trail - former Central Railroad of New Jersey Barnegat Branch, formerly known as Toms River Railroad
- Beaver Lake Trail - former New York, Susquehanna and Western Railway Hanford Branch. Trail is 3 miles long and is in Ogdensburg, NJ
- Berkshire Valley Management Area Trail - follows the Right-of-Way of the former Central Railroad of New Jersey's Lake Hopatcong Railroad from Gordon Road in Roxbury, NJ to Minisink Road in Jefferson, NJ.
- Black River Trail, part of the Patriots' Path - former Central Railroad of New Jersey Hacklebarney Branch, accessed from the Elizabeth D. Kay Environmental Center in Black River County Park, Morris County
- Capoolong Creek Trail - former Lehigh Valley Railroad Pittstown Branch. Starts in Pittstown, NJ and runs about 3.7 miles in Landsdown, NJ.
- Columbia Trail - former Central Railroad of New Jersey High Bridge Branch; trail runs for approximately 15 miles (24 km) and follows South Branch of the Raritan River for most of its length.
- D&R Canal Trail Along Delaware River - 32 miles of the D&R Canal Trail along the Delaware River between Trenton, NJ and Frenchtown, NJ utilizes the former Belvidere Delaware Railroad grade, later owned by the United New Jersey Railroad and Canal Company which itself became a subsidiary of the Pennsylvania Railroad. Portions of the rail bed were built on the original canal towpath. Track remains intact in Lambertville, NJ. The rail-trail was created after track was removed in the early 1980s.
- Edgar Felix Bikeway - former Farmingdale and Squan Village Railroad and Freehold and Jamesburg Agricultural Railroad.
- Great Valley Rail Trail - former Lehigh & New England Railroad. The trail is a 3.5-mile rail trail in Augusta, New Jersey, south of Branchville, New Jersey.
- Henry Hudson Trail - former Central Railroad of New Jersey Seashore Branch (extension to Freehold on former Freehold Branch was completed in 2006)
- Landsdown Trail - former Lehigh Valley Railroad Clinton Branch runs from the southern edge of downtown Clinton, NJ to a rural area approximately 3.75 miles to the south
- Middlesex Greenway - former Lehigh Valley Railroad rail line between Metuchen and Woodbridge; part of the planned East Coast Greenway trail
- Ogden Mine Railroad Trail - former Ogden Mine Railroad right-of-way, part of Mahlon Dickerson Reservation in Morris County
- Patriots' Path (Speedwell Lake to Woodland Road) - former Rockaway Valley Railroad; only portions of the Speedwell Lake to Woodland Road section of Patriots' Path use the former rail bed
- Paulinskill Valley Trail - former main line of the New York, Susquehanna and Western Railway to their former connection with the Lackawanna Railroad
- Pemberton Rail-Trail - extends from Hanover Street in Pemberton to Birmingham Road in Juliustown in Burlington County
- Rocky Hill Branch Trail - former Rocky Hill Branch of the Pennsylvania Railroad. Runs along the east bank of the Delaware and Raritan Canal from Route 27 in Kingston to Rocky Hill. Most of the former rail right-of-way further east to Monmouth Junction is accessible, having been rail-trailed except where Route 1 crosses.
- Sussex Branch Trail - former Sussex Branch of Erie Lackawanna Railroad
- Thomas F. Hampton Memorial Trail - a 1.5 mi (2.4 km) portion of the trail follows an abandoned "donkey" railroad once located at Crossley
- Traction Line Recreation Trail - former Morris County Traction Company trolley line. A two-mile (3 km) portion of the former trolley line along New Jersey Transit's Morris and Essex line in Morris Township serves as a bike trail under the supervision of the Morris County Park System.
- Union Transportation Trail - A 9.0 mi rail trail in Monmouth County, New Jersey located on the former Pemberton and Hightstown Railroad
- West Essex Trail - former Caldwell Branch of Erie Railroad, part of the Lenape Trail system in Essex County
- West Morris Greenway - a 2-mile rail trail that follows the former Lackawanna Railroad Chester Branch; it has terminuses near Horseshoe Lake in Succasunna, NJ and north of the town center in Chester, NJ
- Wharton Rail Trail - runs along the former Mount Hope Mineral Railroad right-of-way in Wharton; a short rail trail (approximately 0.5 miles (0.80 km)) that is paved and has two covered bridges
- Wood Duck Nature Trail - former Hanford Branch of the New York, Susquehanna and Western Railway extends about 1.5 miles on the former railroad bed ending at the Wallkill River

== Proposed rail trails ==
- Camden County - The William Penn Foundation has granted $77,000 to the Rails-to-Trails Conservancy to study the development of rail trails on unused rail lines in and around the city of Camden and surrounding suburban areas. The study is a one-year project called the Camden Metro Region Trails Strategy.
- Former Central Railroad of New Jersey line from Lakehurst to Winslow Junction - Momentum has increased for support of the proposed Wharton Rail-trail in southern Jersey. The line was a remnant of the Conrail bailout of 1976 and has been abandoned since then, and trees have grown up through the rails. Most bridges remain intact and the right-of-way and its access roads are being used by rogue ATVs, mountain bikers and hikers. The area eastward beyond the Batsto River is barren, uneventful, and impossible to ride. However, westward to County Route 536, there are several interesting trestles over tea-colored cedar water streams and hardwood groves amongst the solitude of pine trees. This latter route is mostly single track, and double track in places west of U.S. Route 206 at Atsion. The New Jersey Department of Transportation will be studying the conversion of the line.
- Highlands Rail Trail - Passaic County Highlands Rail Trail is a proposed contiguous recreational trail that will provide a pedestrian and bicycle-friendly pathway through the adaptive reuse of the former New York & Greenwood Lake Railway right-of-way in the Highlands communities of northern Passaic County.
- Rahway Valley Railroad main line. Union County residents have proposed a 7.3-mile pedestrian linear park along the main line of the abandoned Rahway Valley Railroad. The rail trail would run eastbound from Overlook Medical Center on the edge of downtown Summit and head south along the old railbed through Springfield, over the Rahway River via an abandoned trestle, through Union, then Kenilworth and ending at the southwest edge of Roselle Park at the Cranford border. A northern portion of the 7.3 mile rail trail on the RVRR main line is already under construction as the Summit Park Line, with a footbridge over Morris Avenue installed in October 2022. In parallel, advocates have been pushing for immediate development of the portion south of Route 22, running past the Galloping Hill Golf Course through Kenilworth and Roselle Park. The New Jersey Department of Transportation, which owns the railbed, has been working to clear it in anticipation of possible future trail use.
- The inactive Staten Island Rapid Transit line has also been proposed as a Union County rail trail. The ending of the railway is on Westfield Avenue in Roselle Park. The Staten Island Rapid Transit runs from Cranford to the Arthur Kill in Linden, New Jersey and onward through Staten Island, although the project would only include the section that runs from Cranford to Linden. The possible west end in Cranford would be a lot adjacent to the railroad right-of-way on South Avenue East. The lot is currently owned by Lehigh Acquisition. The east end of this trail would be in Linden along another empty lot. A boardwalk could be placed over the existing tracks due to the possibility of the line being reactivated.
- Essex - Hudson Greenway along a portion of Erie Railroad's New York and Greenwood Lake Railway, later NJ Transit's Boonton Line, bypassed by the Montclair Connection from Jersey City to Montclair
