= Hacklebarney State Park =

State park in Morris County, New Jersey

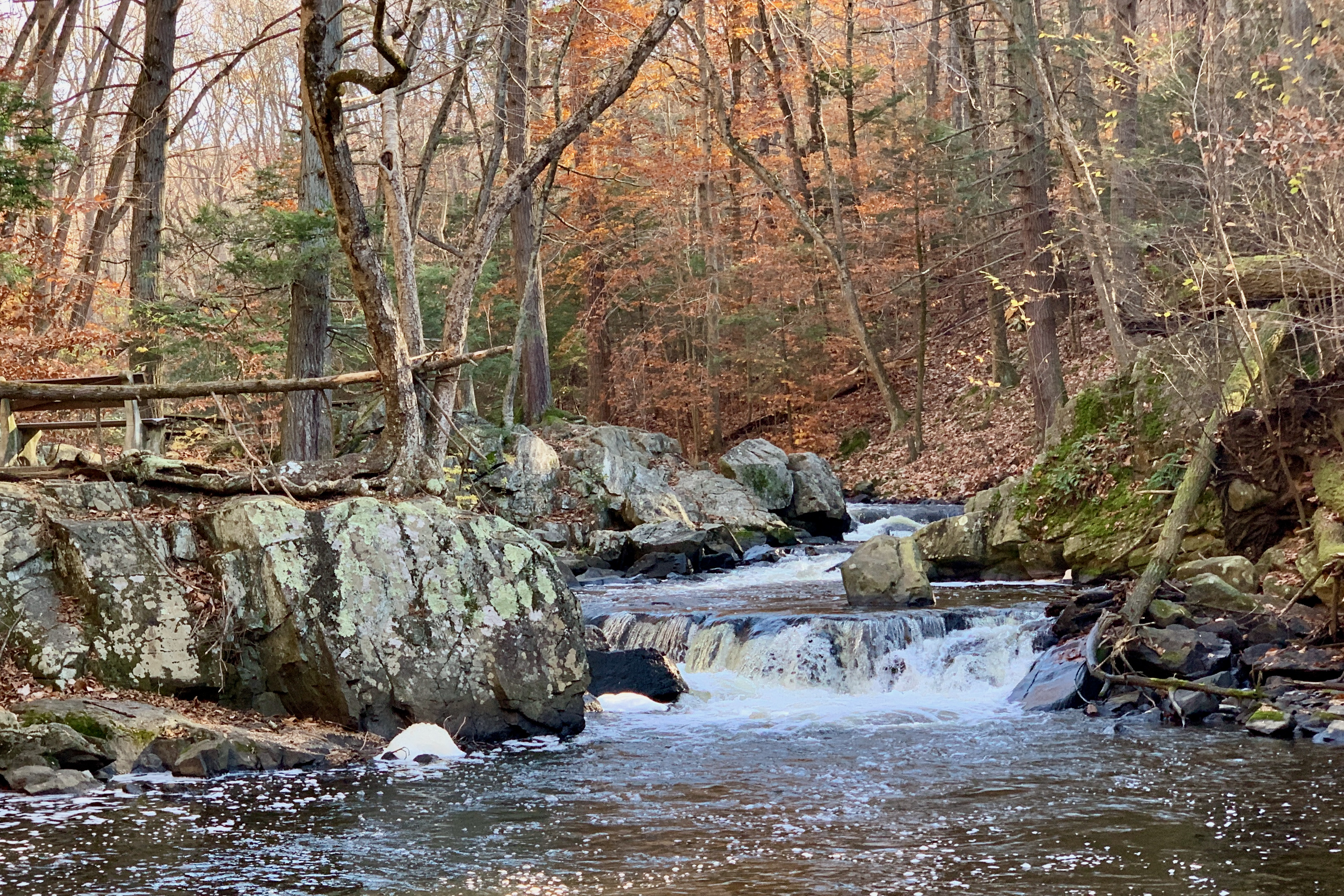
- The Black River, Hacklebarney State Park

- Location within New Jersey Location within the United States
- Type: "State Park"
- Location: Morris County
- Coordinates: 40°44′53″N 74°43′56″W
- Area: 1,186 acres (4.80 km^{2})
- Opened: 1924
- Operator: New Jersey Division of Parks and Forestry
- Visitors: 100,000 visitors annually
- Website: Official website

Hacklebarney State Park is a state park of the U.S. state of New Jersey, located between Long Valley and Chester in Morris County. The park is managed by the New Jersey Division of Parks and Forestry. Other parks in the Black River region include the Black River Wildlife Management Area and the Black River County Park.

== Description ==
Hacklebarney State Park is a hiking destination year round. It has 978 acres (3.96 km^{2}) and multiple hiking trails throughout the park. Through the middle of the park runs the Black River. The river is fed by two brooks, Trout and Rinehart. The Black River is flanked by massive boulders. These boulders create many waterfalls that can be seen from the trail. The park is known for its hiking and scenery, especially in the fall when the leaves begin to change colors.

== Accommodations ==
The park is open daily from dawn until dusk. There is no entrance fee. The park has over 100 picnic tables located throughout. These tables are unable to be reserved and are on a first-come, first-served basis. There are also multiple charcoal grills located near the picnic tables. Bikes are not allowed in the park, the trails are for hiking only. Pets are welcome but must be leashed at all times. There is a playground located within the park near the parking lot and the restrooms. The park has limited wheel chair accessibility, only the bathrooms and parking lot can accommodate them. Horseback riding is not permitted within the park.

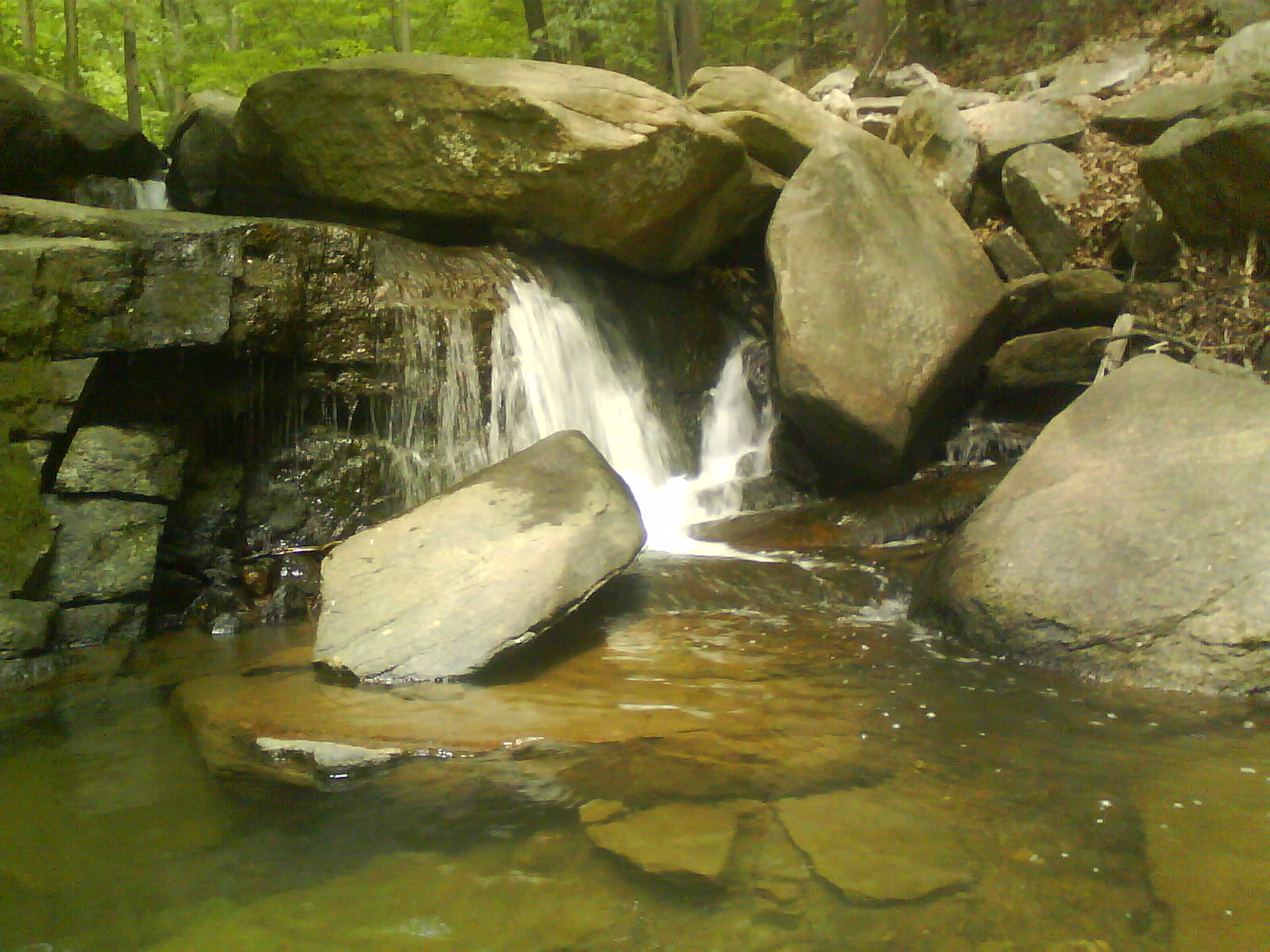
One of the waterfalls at Hacklebarney State Park, New Jersey

== Animals and Plants ==
There are over 100 species of birds that live within the park. There are also many species of wildlife that live within the park including the black bear, fox, woodchuck, deer, and squirrels. Hunting is allowed within the park in the area that is not designated for day use. Fishing is also allowed within the park. The New Jersey Division of Fish and Wildlife stock the Black River with Rainbow Trout regularly, while a wild population of brown and brook trout continues to mature into a healthy fishery. Throughout the park there are also many endangered plants including the American ginseng, leatherwood, and Virginia pennywort.

== Geology ==
The park has the Black River running through the middle of it so there is a lot of built of minerals and other sediment on the side of the river. Some of the materials contained there are garnet, biotite, feldspar gneiss, and quartz.

== Climate ==
The weather for the park can vary slightly depending on the year, but its climate is similar. Fall weather begins around mid-September and will last until November; during this time, temperatures range from 45–65 °F (7–18 °C). Winter usually lasts from November to March and will have temperatures from 20–40 °F (−7–4 °C). Spring starts around March and ends around June and will have temperatures from 50–70 °F (10–21 °C). Summer lasts from June until mid-September and will have an average temperature range from 80-90 °F (32 °C).

== History ==
The land where Hacklebarney is now located was originally inhabited by many Native American tribes. Over thousands of years, these tribes evolved from hunters and gatherers to the agricultural tribes, such as the Lenni Lenape. Evidence of these tribes can still be seen by the Black River in the form of mushpots. In the early 18th century the community became mostly agricultural. As more people moved to the area iron mines began to be developed. For more than 100 years, these iron mines ruled the land where Hacklebarney is now located. The land for Hacklebarney State Park was donated by Adolphe E. Borie. He was described as a merchant in zinc manufacturing. Adolphe served as president of the Savage Arms Company and vice president of the Bethlehem Steel Corporation. There is no evidence as to why Adolphe donated his land, but at the time there were many other large land donations being made. On June 5, 1924, Adolphe and Sarah Borie donated 32 acres to the people of New Jersey. There were a few conditions that came with the gift. These included the park being used for picnic tables, family vacations, and a forest demonstration area. The Bories were also to have the privilege to camp at one of five specified campgrounds in the park. A special term of the gift was that a memorial needed to be created honoring Susan Borie, Adolphe's mother, and Susan Patterson, Adolphe's niece. This was done by putting two stone pillars at the entrance to the park. In 1929, Adolphe donated 90 more acres and suggested that he would donate more if the entrance was moved farther south down the Black River. His request was granted and he donated another sum of land. With the acceptance of this donation, the state decided to use money for the developing of the park. The development of Hacklebarney Park was part of a National movement known as "The Golden Age of Parks." During this period of time, there began a huge conservation effort known as the Civilian Conservation Corps, also known as the CCC. The goals of this agency were to create jobs for men 17−24, create parks, preserve national monuments, and conserve forest land. The parks division was influenced by people's newfound love of the road and the growing of the Girl Scouts of the USA and the Boy Scouts of America and their need for open spaces to conduct their outdoor activities. Hacklebarney Park was a part of this movement from 1933 to 1943. During this time, over 1,000 men worked in the park building trails, picnic tables, and many other additions the park needed. Although the CCC's work is still the biggest conservation project ever completed in the park, some of the additions are no longer used, such as the original water system. It is believed that the first superintendent of the park was C.E. Pollock. He oversaw the park during the CCC era into the 1940s. In 1981 the park was almost shut down due to budget cuts. The park now has over 100,000 visitors annually and 978 acres (3.96 km^{2}) of land.

== Name ==
It is not fully known how Hacklebarney got its name. There is the belief that it comes from Native American heritage. Some sources say it comes from the word haki meaning "ground" and barney a variation of bohihen meaning "to put wood on fire" or hackiboni meaning "to put wood on fire on the ground" or "bonfire". There is also the belief that it comes from the iron mining history. The mine in the area had a foreman named Barney Tracey, who often heckled the men on site, and took on the name "Heckle" Barney. The last claim is that the land near the Hacklebarney mine may have been owned by Barney Hackle.

== The park in pop culture ==
- A mafia execution in The Sopranos episode "From Where to Eternity" was described as taking place in the park, though the scene was actually filmed in the Paramus borough of Bergen County.
- A body in the first season of Showtime's New Jersey set Yellowjackets (2022) was said to be buried offscreen in Hacklebarney Park.
