= From Where to Eternity =

- The Sopranos episode
- Episode no.: Season 2 Episode 9
- Directed by: Henry J. Bronchtein
- Written by: Michael Imperioli
- Cinematography by: Phil Abraham
- Production code: 209
- Original air date: March 12, 2000
- Running time: 55 minutes

Episode chronology
← Previous "Full Leather Jacket"	Next → "Bust Out"
- The Sopranos season 2

"From Where to Eternity" is the 22nd episode of the HBO original series The Sopranos and the ninth of the show's second season. It was written by Michael Imperioli and directed by Henry J. Bronchtein, and originally aired on March 12, 2000.

== Starring ==
- James Gandolfini as Tony Soprano
- Lorraine Bracco as Dr. Jennifer Melfi
- Edie Falco as Carmela Soprano
- Michael Imperioli as Christopher Moltisanti
- Dominic Chianese as Corrado Soprano, Jr. *
- Vincent Pastore as Big Pussy Bonpensiero
- Steven Van Zandt as Silvio Dante
- Tony Sirico as Paulie Gualtieri
- Robert Iler as Anthony Soprano, Jr.
- Jamie-Lynn Sigler as Meadow Soprano
- Drea de Matteo as Adriana La Cerva
- David Proval as Richie Aprile
- Aida Turturro as Janice Soprano
- Nancy Marchand as Livia Soprano *

* = credit only

=== Guest starring ===
- Jerry Adler as Hesh Rabkin

==== Also guest starring ====
- Peter Bogdanovich as Dr. Elliot Kupferberg
- Lillo Brancato, Jr. as Matt Bevilaqua
- Louis Lombardi as Skip Lipari
- Brian Aguiar as Jimmy
- Seth Barrish as Doctor
- Michael Cannis as Detective #2
- Tom Cappadona as Daniel King
- Nancy Cassaro as Joanne Moltisanti
- Scottie Epstein as Quickie G
- John Christopher Jones as Kevin Cullen
- Peter McRobbie as Father Felix
- Judy Reyes as Michelle
- James Sioutis as Detective #1
- Lisa Valens as Felicia Anne
- Maureen Van Zandt as Gabriella Dante
- Gameela Wright as Nurse

== Synopsis ==
Christopher is in the hospital after being shot in the previous episode. He is clinically dead for about a minute and his spleen is removed, but he survives. Conscious but heavily medicated with morphine, Christopher tells Tony and Paulie that he went to Hell and saw Brendan Filone and Mikey Palmice; he also saw his father, who gets killed again every night. He reports that Filone and Palmice had a message for Tony and Paulie: "Three o'clock."

Tony comforts Christopher, assuring him it was only a dream. Discussing his experience with Dr. Melfi, Tony says he does not think he or Christopher will go to Hell. He explains: "Soldiers don't go to Hell ... everybody involved knows the stakes and ... you gotta do certain things. It's business. We're soldiers."

Paulie, however, is deeply disturbed. He tries to persuade Christopher it was only purgatory, not Hell, but still has nightmares about it. On his girlfriend's advice, he seeks the help of a psychic, who appears to have a terrifying knowledge of Paulie's past, including the name of the first man he killed thirty years before. Paulie complains to his priest that all the donations he has made to the church should have given him immunity; he will not donate anymore.

Pussy has a bad-tempered meeting with Agent Skip Lipari. He tells him nothing but repeats his fear that Tony suspects him. An informer on the street tells Pussy where Matt is hiding, and he and Tony go there together. Tony questions Matt, establishing that Richie had no part in the attempt to kill Christopher, then shoots him. He glances at Pussy, who hesitates but shoots him too; they empty their guns into the lifeless body. They have dinner in a familiar restaurant and talk nostalgically of old times.

While Christopher is near death, Carmela finds an empty hospital room with a crucifix and prays for him. When he is conscious, she tells him he has been given a second chance, but as they speak she realizes Tony lied when he told her that Christopher dreamed of going to Heaven.

The women are gossiping about an associate of the Sopranos whose long-term comàre has had his child. Dreading the shame if such a thing happened to her own family, Carmela asks Tony to have a vasectomy. He vigorously refuses, and when he assures her that he has had his girlfriend tested for AIDS she leaves their bed in revulsion. Later, having reconsidered, Tony says he will consent – but to his bafflement, she has changed her mind. She says, "All I want is you. That's all I have ever wanted," and makes passionate love to him.

== First appearance ==
- Joanne Moltisanti: Christopher Moltisanti's mother, and the widow of Richard Moltisanti. Played by the first of two actresses to play the role.

== Deceased ==
- Matthew Bevilaqua: Riddled with bullets by Tony and Pussy for his involvement in the attempted murder of Christopher.

== Title reference ==
The episode's title is a play on the film From Here to Eternity (1953). It also refers to Christopher's taking a trip to the afterlife and not knowing whether it was purgatory or hell. It may also be a reference to the Giorgio Moroder album of that name; a later episode in the season, Knight In White Satin Armor, also shares a similar name with a Moroder album.

== Production ==
- In his dream, Christopher describes how Mikey Palmice and Brendan Filone claimed that the time three o'clock would be important in the lives of Tony and Paulie.
- This is the second one of four episodes directed by Henry Bronchtein, as well as one of two which earned Bronchtein best-direction nominations by the Directors Guild of America.
- In his commentary for the episode "The Telltale Moozadell", Michael Imperioli says the idea of Christopher's experiences in this episode came from a spec script he had written between the first and second seasons about Christopher overdosing on drugs and having an after-life experience. When he talked to showrunner David Chase about this, Chase said that Christopher would get shot in the second season, and the after-life part could be added to the story.

== Cultural references ==
- Tony tells Melfi the Hitlers and Pol Pots deserve hell and not people like Christopher. He also mentions America's need for Italian immigrants to "build cities and dig subways and to make them richer." He explains that the Carnegie and Rockefeller families needed "worker bees" (Italian immigrant workers), but some didn't want to "lose who we were, and preserve the things that meant to us: honor and family and loyalty". He says the J. P. Morgans were "crooks and killers too, but that's a business right, the American way."
- Carmela is seen reading Memoirs of a Geisha in bed in this and several succeeding episodes.
- Tony refers to the psychic as a Ghostbuster.
- A.J. is seen playing the Game Boy Color game Pokémon Pinball.
- Bevilaqua hides in Hacklebarney State Park, supposedly near a house that claims "George Washington slept here," a common claim made by old taverns, historic houses and pubs, often with little evidence. There is one building in New Jersey that Washington definitely did sleep in, Dey Mansion, although that is about 29 mi (47 km) from Hacklebarney.

== Music ==
- Otis Redding's "My Lover's Prayer" (from Complete & Unbelievable: The Otis Redding Dictionary of Soul) is played throughout the episode and over the end credits (specifically, when Christopher is in the hospital, when his friends and family wait in the hospital waiting room while Chris is in surgery, and over the end credits when Tony and Carmela have sex).
- The O'Jays' song "Use ta Be My Girl", from So Full of Love, is played when Quickie G tells Pussy where Matthew Bevilaqua is hiding.
- The Metallica song "King Nothing", from Load, is played in the background while Paulie talks to Tony at the Bada Bing! after he visits the psychic.
- The song "Mona Lisa" is heard in the background at the Duke's Stockyard Inn (an Irish bar and restaurant) where Tony and Pussy eat steaks, reminisce, and discuss God.

== Filming locations ==
Listed in order of first appearance:

- Harrison, New Jersey
- North Caldwell, New Jersey
- Satriale's Pork Store in Kearny, New Jersey
- Paramus, New Jersey — standing in for Hacklebarney State Park
