= Elizabeth D. Kay Environmental Center =

Conservation organization in New Jersey

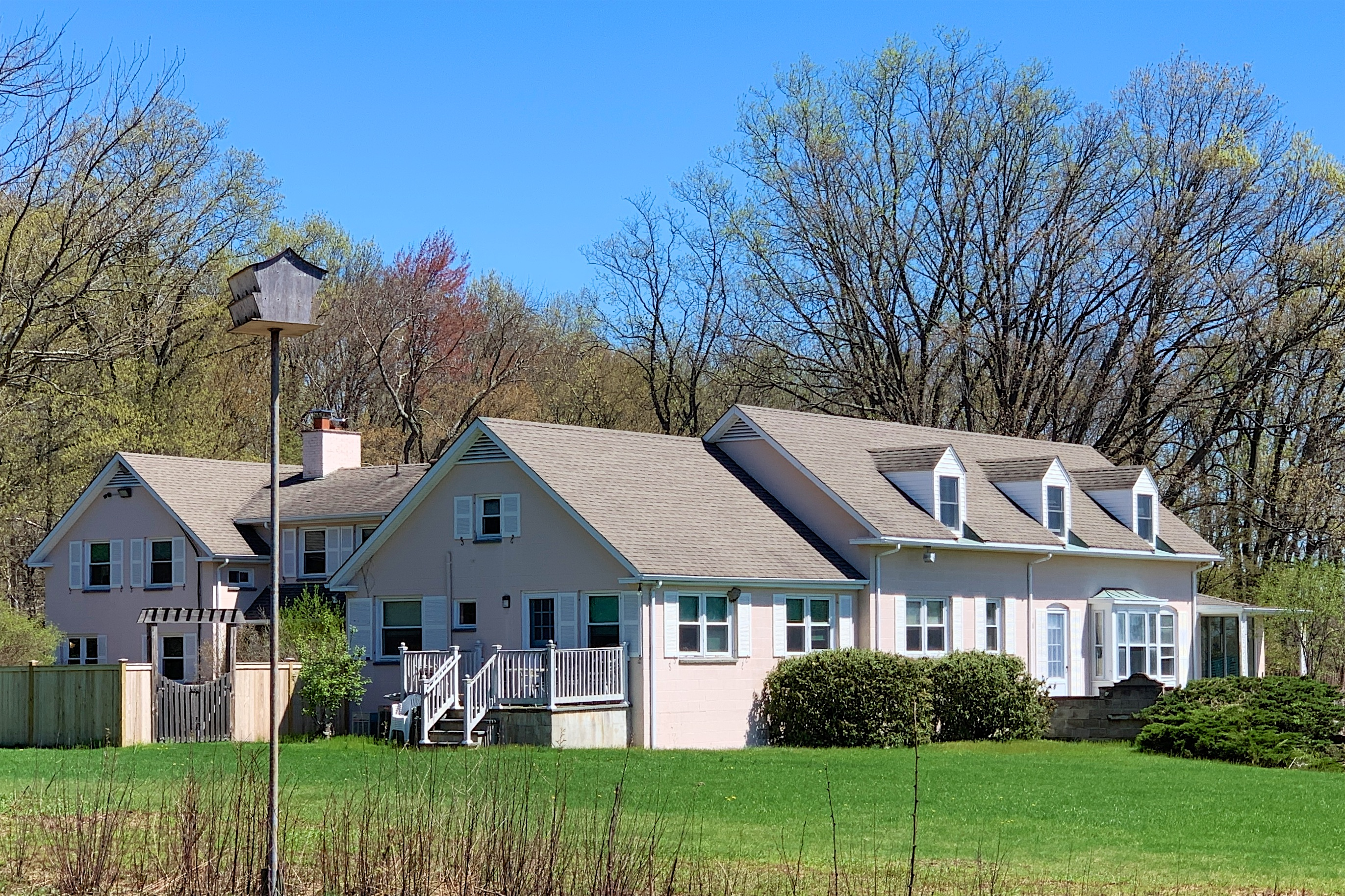

- Location within Morris County, New Jersey Location within New Jersey Location within the United States
- Type: Nature center
- Location: 200 Pottersville Road; Chester Township, New Jersey
- Coordinates: 40°45′50″N 74°42′43″W
- Area: 223 acres (90 ha)
- Operator: Morris County Parks Commission

The Elizabeth D. Kay Environmental Center is located on a 223-acre (90 ha) site by the Black River in Chester Township, Morris County, New Jersey. The center was dedicated on October 28, 1993. The property, previously known as Hidden River Farm, was donated by Elizabeth D. Kay and her husband Alfred. The building is used as the field office of The Nature Conservancy in New Jersey. The Patriots' Path crosses the fields and forests of the property.

== Gallery ==
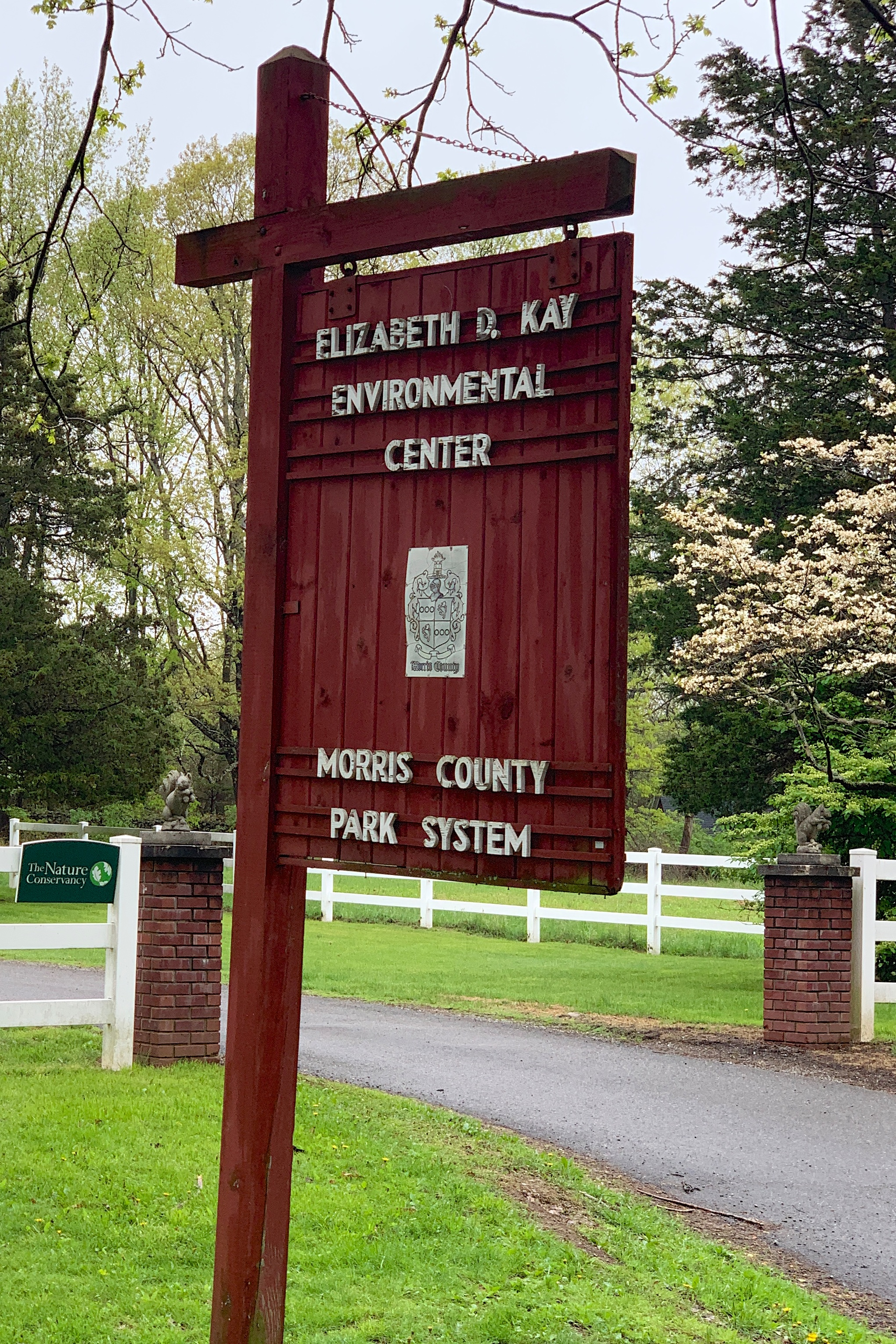
Entrance sign

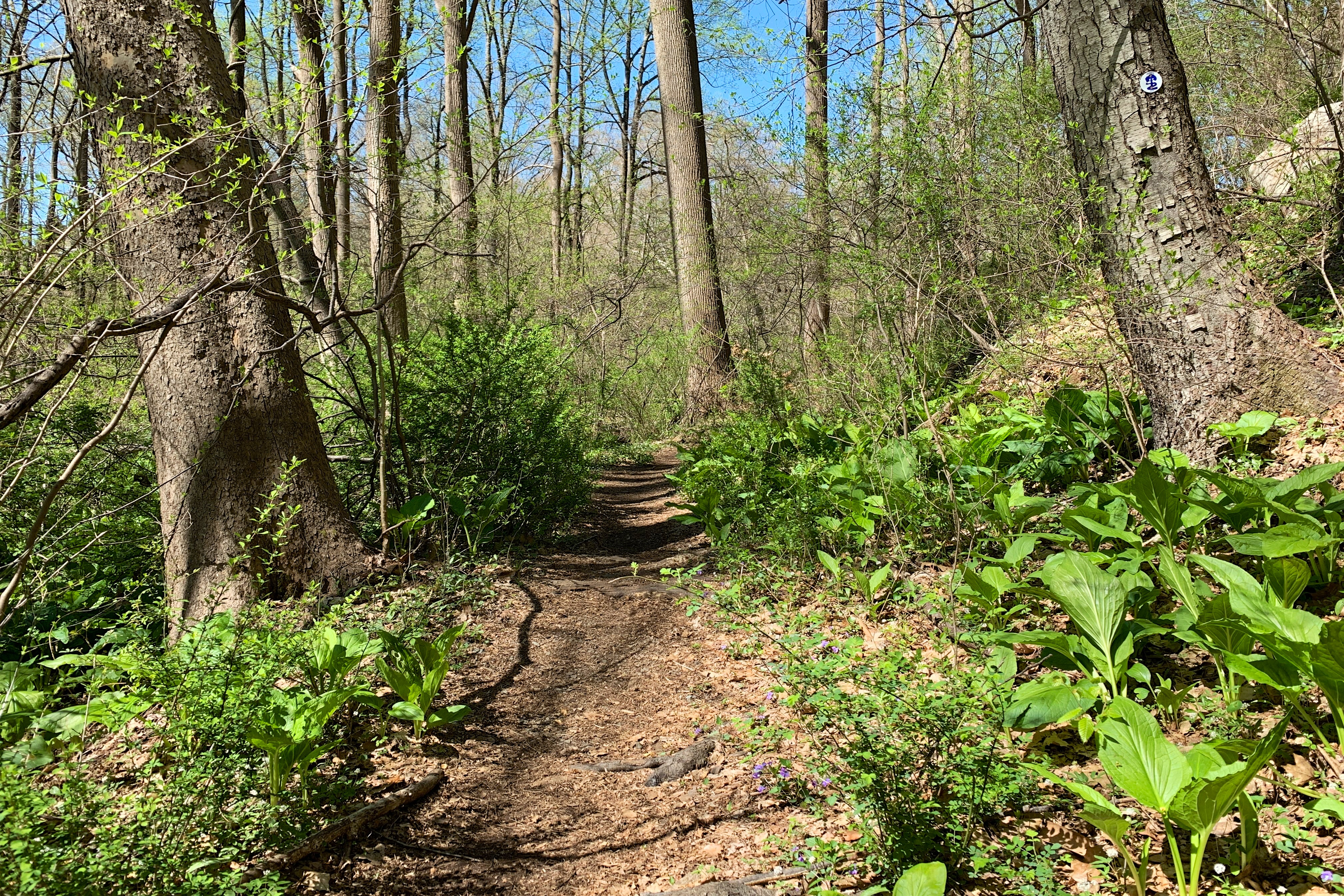
The Patriots' Path by the Black River

== See also ==
- List of nature centers in New Jersey
- Black River County Park
- Bamboo Brook Outdoor Education Center
- Willowwood Arboretum
