= Patriots' Path =

Trail system in Morris County, New Jersey

Coordinates: 41.039°N 74.321°W

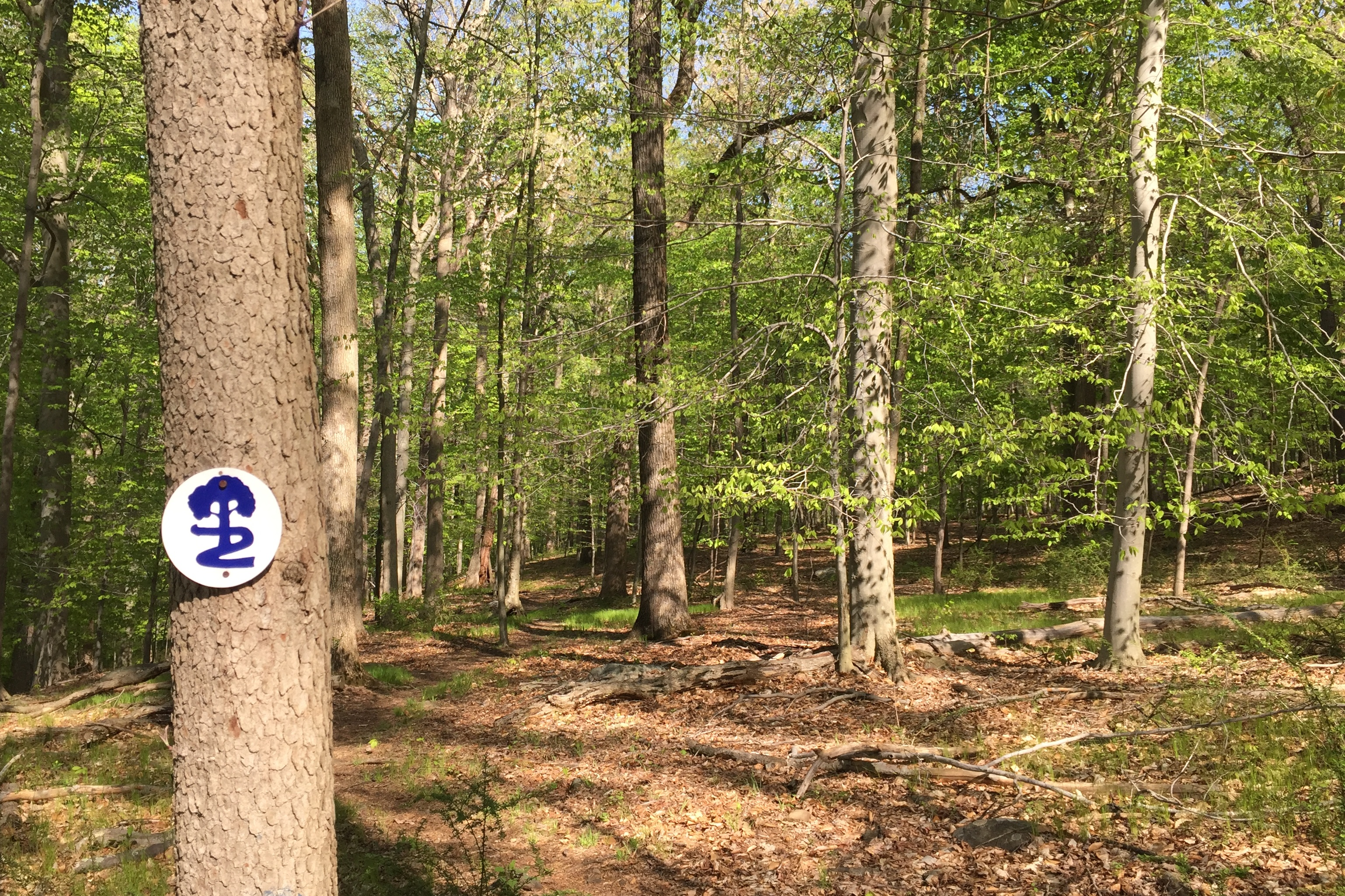
- Patriots's Path in the New Jersey Brigade Encampment Site
- Length: 90 mi (140 km)
- Location: Morris County, New Jersey
- Designation: National Recreation Trail
- Trailheads: E. Hanover Township; Washington Township
- Use: Hiking, Mountain cycling
- Difficulty: Easy
- Season: Year round
- Surface: Asphalt, crushed stone, gravel, ballast, grass, dirt

The Patriots' Path is a multi-use trail system in Morris County, New Jersey, open to cyclists, hikers, and horseback riders, consisting of a 55-mile (89 km) main trail and 35 miles (56 km) of spur trails. The main trail is marked with white blazes or a white circular blaze with a brown tree. The spur trails are marked with blue blazes or a white circle with a blue tree, while the side spur trails are marked with a red blaze or a white circle with a red tree.

== Description ==
Patriots' Path stretches from East Hanover, where it connects with the Lenape Trail in Essex County, to Allamuchy Mountain State Park in Sussex County, and the Village of High Bridge in Hunterdon County. In southern Morris County, the path travels mostly along the corridors of the Whippany River, Black River, and Raritan River. Different portions of Patriots' Path include bike trails (paved), cross-country skiing, equestrian trails, and hiking trails (handicap accessible). Parts of the trail are along the right-of-way of the former Rockaway Valley Railroad.

The Patriots’ Path is a part of two other larger trail systems. It is included in the Liberty–Water Gap Trail and the September 11th National Memorial Trail. The Liberty–Water Gap Trail is approximately 150 miles (240 km) and the September 11th National Memorial Trail is 1,300 miles (2,100 km) in length.

The Patriots’ Path is a popular location for scouts to complete their Eagle Project. Some of the Eagle Projects that scouts have completed on the Patriots’ Path include installing benches, extending the trail and installing proper signage, and trail renovation and beautification. A particularly popular project to complete is installing a footbridge on the trail.

== Points of interest ==
- Bamboo Brook Outdoor Education Center
- Frelinghuysen Arboretum
- Acorn Hall
- Ford Mansion
- Pocahontas Lake
- Speedwell Ironworks
- Lewis Morris County Park
- Jockey Hollow
- Black River Wildlife Management Area
- Nathan Cooper Gristmill
- Chubb Park
- Ken Lockwood Gorge WMA
- Schooley's Mountain County Park
- Elizabeth D. Kay Environmental Center
- Willowwood Arboretum
- New Jersey Brigade Encampment Site – Morristown National Historical Park
- Washington Valley Historic District

== Gallery ==
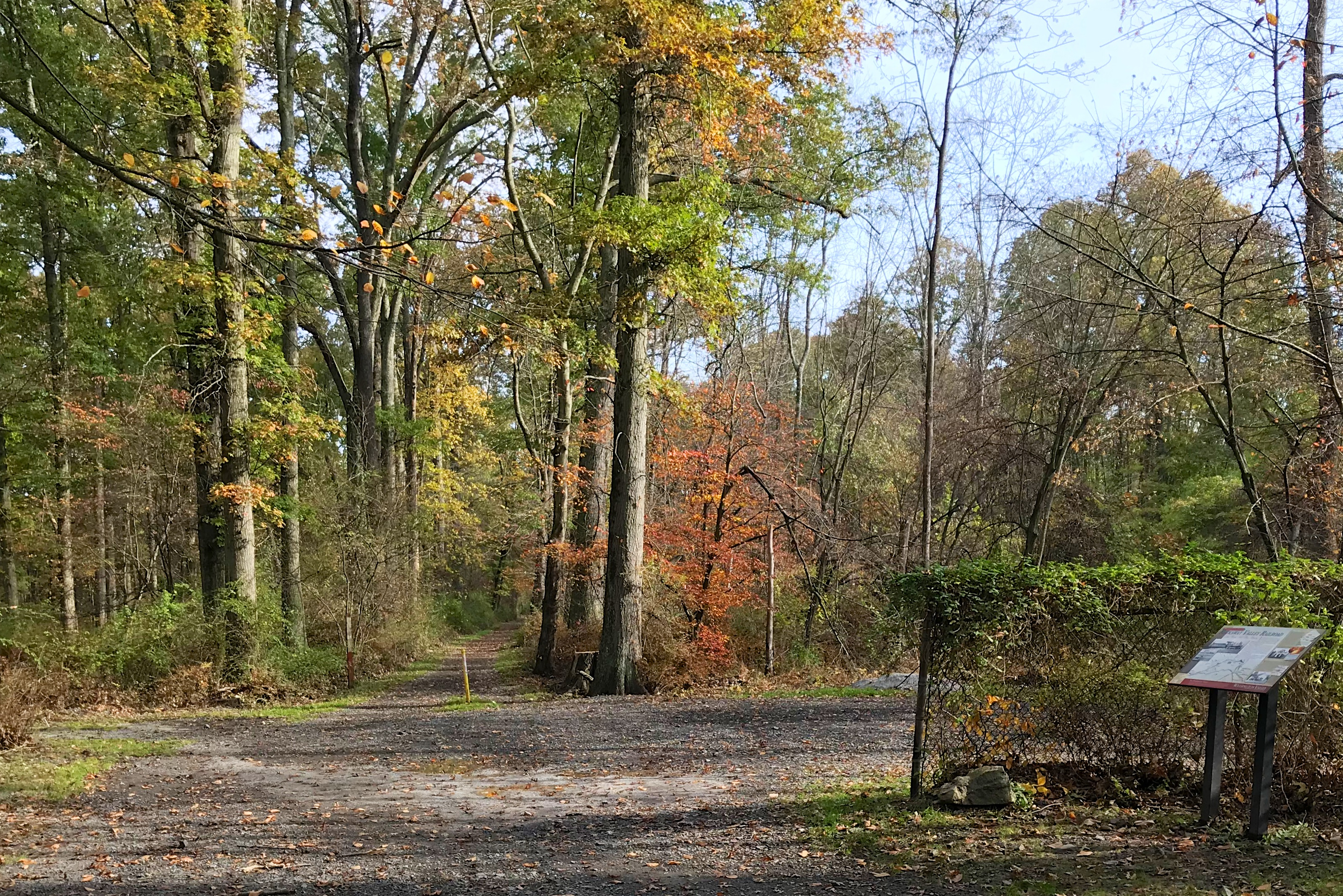
The trail passing the site of the Washington Valley station of the Rockaway Valley Railroad.

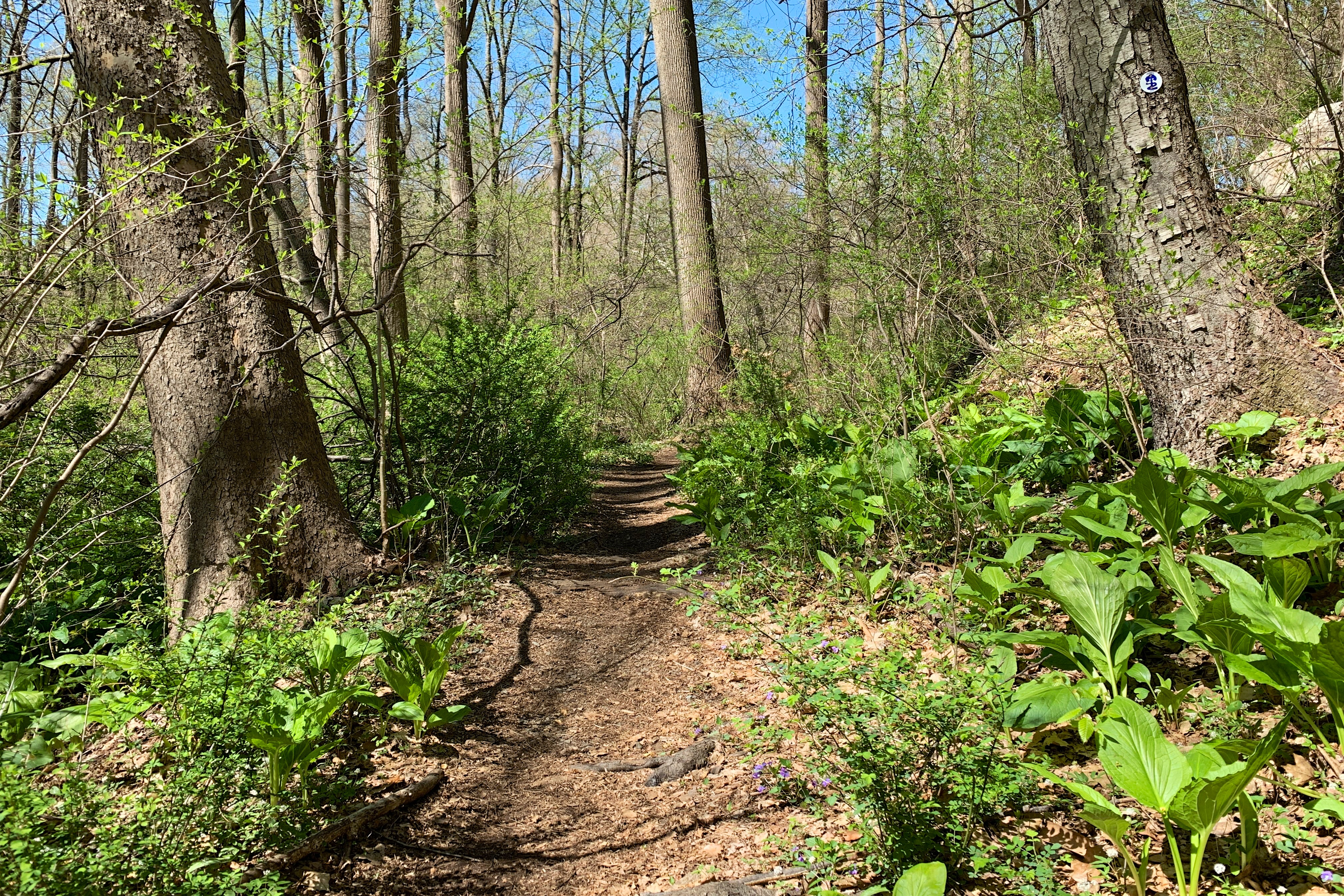
The trail by the Black River, near the Elizabeth D. Kay Environmental Center

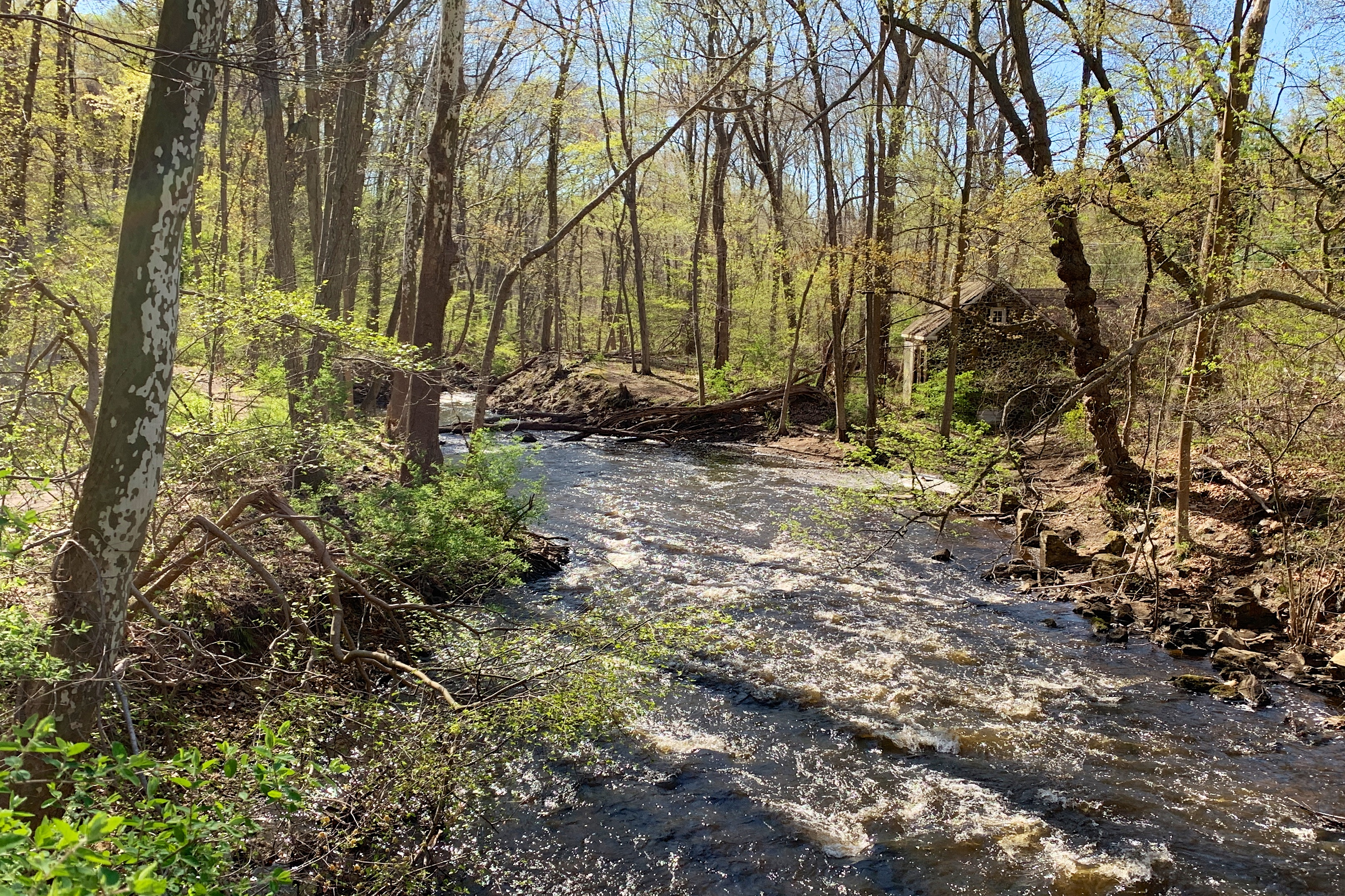
The Black River in the Black River County Park, with the trail on the left

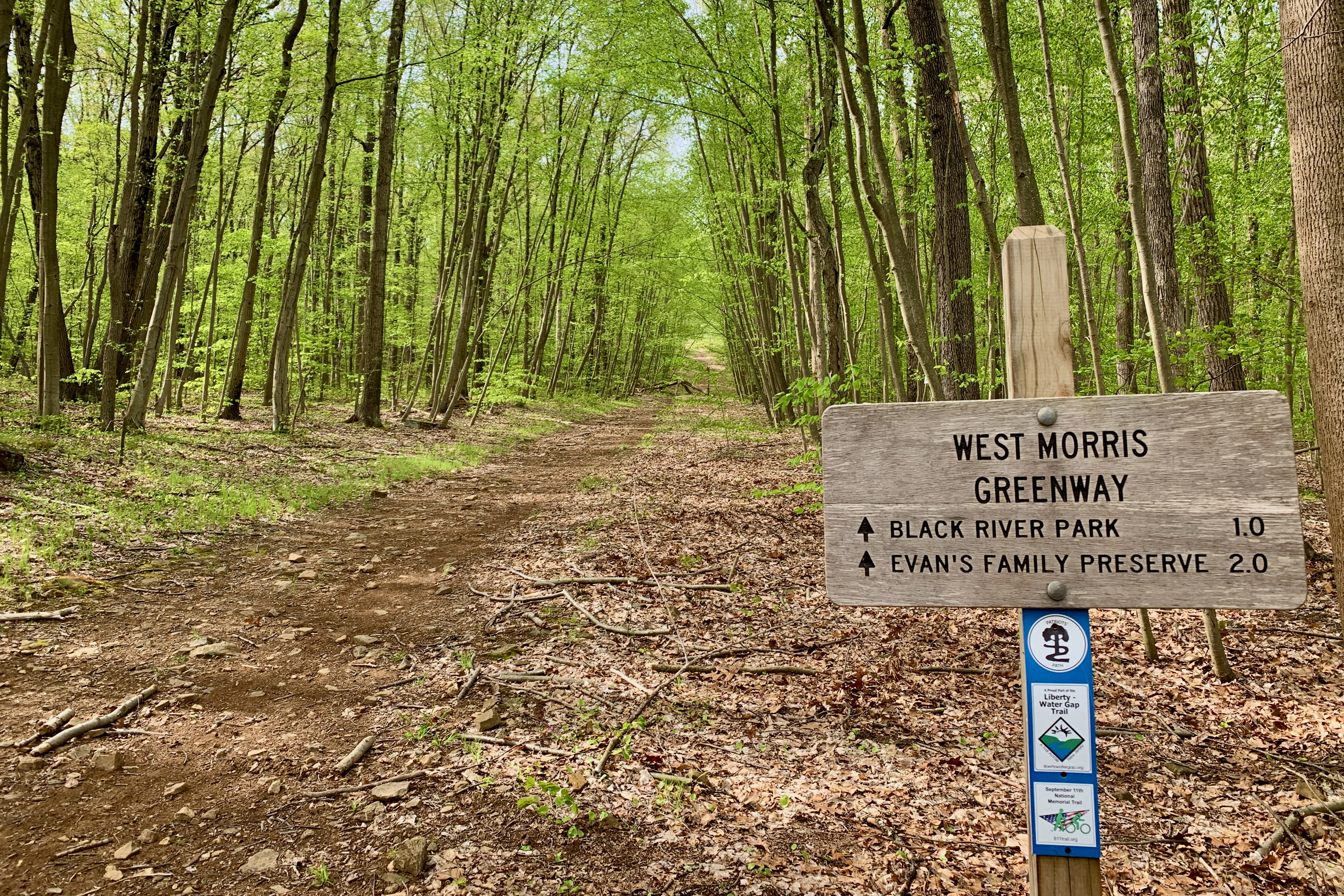
Black River Wildlife Management Area trail, aligned with the West Morris Greenway, Liberty–Water Gap and September 11th National Memorial Trails

== See also ==
- Whippany River
- Hanover Township
- Whippany River Watershed Action Committee
- Frelinghuysen Arboretum
