= Black River Wildlife Management Area =

Wildlife management area in Chester Township, New Jersey

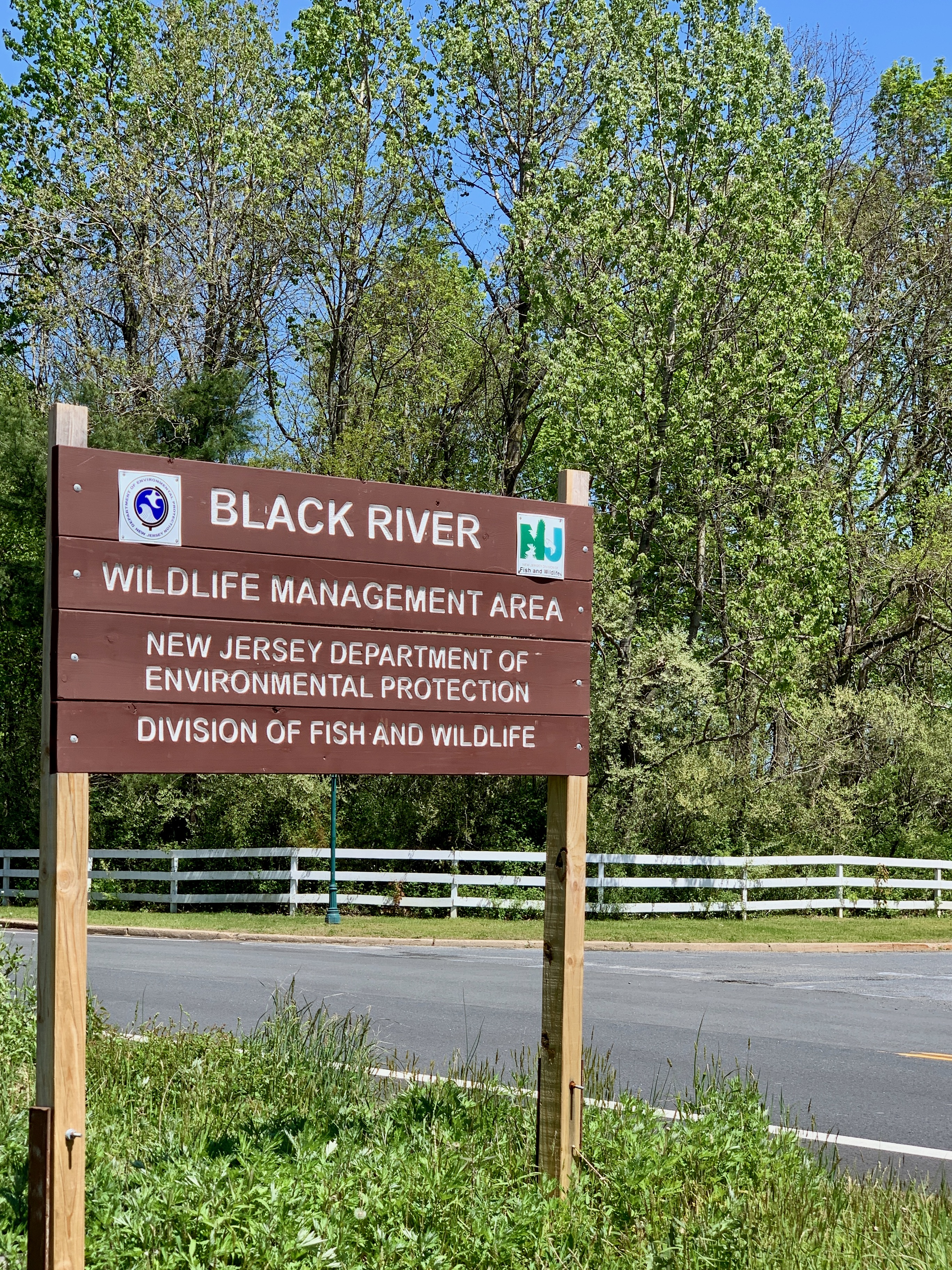

- Location within Morris County, New Jersey Location within New Jersey Location within the United States
- Location: Chester Township, Morris County, New Jersey
- Coordinates: 40°49′00″N 74°40′29″W
- Area: 3,078 acres (1,246 ha)
- Governing body: New Jersey Division of Fish and Wildlife

The Black River Wildlife Management Area is located along the Black River (also known as the Lamington River) in Chester Township of Morris County, New Jersey. This WMA is 3,078 acres (12.46 km^{2}) and includes diverse landscape with plentiful flora and fauna. The Patriots' Path follows an abandoned branch of the Delaware, Lackawanna and Western Railroad along the river.

Other parks in the Black River valley are the Black River County Park and the Hacklebarney State Park.

== See also ==
- List of New Jersey wildlife management areas
