= Full Leather Jacket =

- The Sopranos episode
- Episode no.: Season 2 Episode 8
- Directed by: Allen Coulter
- Written by: Robin Green; Mitchell Burgess
- Cinematography by: Phil Abraham
- Production code: 208
- Original air date: March 5, 2000
- Running time: 43 minutes

Episode chronology
| ← Previous "D-Girl" | Next → "From Where to Eternity" |
- The Sopranos season 2

"Full Leather Jacket" is the 21st episode of the HBO original series The Sopranos and the eighth of the show's second season. It was written by Robin Green and Mitchell Burgess, directed by Allen Coulter, and originally aired on March 5, 2000.

== Starring ==
- James Gandolfini as Tony Soprano
- Lorraine Bracco as Dr. Jennifer Melfi
- Edie Falco as Carmela Soprano
- Michael Imperioli as Christopher Moltisanti
- Dominic Chianese as Corrado Soprano Jr.
- Vincent Pastore as Pussy Bonpensiero *
- Steven Van Zandt as Silvio Dante
- Tony Sirico as Paulie Gualtieri
- Robert Iler as Anthony Soprano Jr.
- Jamie-Lynn Sigler as Meadow Soprano
- Drea de Matteo as Adriana La Cerva
- David Proval as Richie Aprile
- Aida Turturro as Janice Soprano
- Nancy Marchand as Livia Soprano *

* = credit only

=== Guest starring ===
- Saundra Santiago as Jean Cusamano and Joan O'Connell
- Lillo Brancato, Jr. as Matt Bevilaqua
- Chris Tardio as Sean Gismonte
- Federico Castelluccio as Furio Giunta
- Paul Herman as Beansie Gaeta
- Steven R. Schirripa as Bobby Baccalieri
- Joseph Gannascoli as Vito Spatafore
- Vincent J. Orofino as Bryan Spatafore
- Tom Aldredge as Hugh DeAngelis
- Susan Blackwell as Therapist
- Joseph Carino as Secretary
- Raymond Franza as Donny K
- Patty McCormack as Liz La Cerva
- Katalin Pota as Lilliana
- Marek Przystup as Stasiu
- Stelio Savante as Gaetano Giarizzo
- Suzanne Shepherd as Mary DeAngelis
- Donna Smythe as Gia Gaeta

== Synopsis ==
Meadow hopes to go to Berkeley; her parents Tony and Carmela want to prevent it. Their neighbor, Jean Cusamano, has a sister, Joan O'Connell, who is a prestigious alumna of Georgetown University. Carmela cajoles Jean into asking Joan to write a letter of recommendation for Meadow. Joan declines, but Carmela visits her, presents her with a ricotta pie and insists, "I want you to write that letter." Jean reports to Carmela that the letter has been written, and Carmela asks for a copy.

Silvio and Paulie pressure Richie to build Beansie a wheelchair ramp for his house, as partial reparation for crippling him. Richie scornfully refuses, but when he learns that these instructions come from Tony, he sends his nephew Vito Spatafore and his construction workers to fully adapt Beansie's house.

Richie has a leather jacket which he obtained years ago from the feared mobster Rocco DiMeo. He describes it as "fine Corinthian leather" and gives it to Tony, who accepts it reluctantly but politely. Richie attaches great importance to the jacket and to the act of giving it to Tony. He later sees it being worn by the husband of the Sopranos' maid and is deeply offended.

Adriana, embarrassed in a restaurant by Christopher, has left him and gone back to her mother's. Christopher goes to her, proposes marriage and presents her with a ring. She says she loves him, and the ring. In bed, he tells her, "I'm back on track, rededicating myself"—to her and to Tony.

Matt and Sean continue to work with Christopher, breaking into safes. Having been subjected to various slights and snubs by members of the DiMeo family, they feel they are getting nowhere and must do something drastic. They ambush Christopher as he is leaving a diner, imagining that this will gain them favor with Richie. Christopher is shot three times and left unconscious; Sean is killed. Matt flees and asks for Richie's protection; Richie, furious, chases him away. As Christopher lies comatose in the hospital, Tony asks, "How could this happen?"

== First appearances ==
- Liz La Cerva: The mother of Adriana La Cerva.
- Bryan Spatafore: The brother of Vito Spatafore.
- Donny K: A soldier in Richie Aprile's crew.
- Stanisław "Stasiu" Wosilius: husband of the Sopranos' housekeeper, Lilliana.

== Deceased ==
- Sean Gismonte: shot in the head in self-defense by Christopher Moltisanti.

== Title reference ==
The episode's title is a play on the 1987 film Full Metal Jacket, whose title refers to full metal jacket bullets. Here, it alludes to the leather jacket that Richie gave to Tony. Also, after Christopher is shot, the camera pans the sidewalk showing the metal cartridge casings that have been expelled from the weapons.

On a thematic level, Matt and Sean ambushing Christopher as a way to prove themselves to Richie reflects the killing of the Vietnamese sniper by Joker in the film Full Metal Jacket, which—at least on one level—can also be understood as a reluctant way act by Joker to prove himself in the eyes of Animal Mother and the others. Richie is shown as being abusive of others around him in a similar way as Animal Mother is abusive of other Lusthog Squad Marines, who still in a way rely on him for their safety. More generally, this episode is linked to the film referenced in its title through the theme of "loss of innocence".

== Production ==
- Saundra Santiago plays a dual role in this episode, portraying twin sisters Jean Cusamano and Joannie O'Connell.
- Although the episode was the eighth of the second season, it was the seventh to be produced.
- Unlike most other episodes, there is no song played over the end credits. Instead, all that is heard is the sound of Christopher's ventilator and the electrocardiogram machine.
- This is the shortest episode of the series, running just under 43 minutes.
- Sean Gismonte is killed by Christopher because Sean was restrained in the car by a seatbelt. This is similar to Livia's story to A.J. of how seatbelts can kill, from the previous episode, "D-Girl".

== Music ==
- The song played during the opening scene of this episode when the Soprano family eats Chinese food, is "Baker Street" by Gerry Rafferty. Later, when Christopher and Adriana are in bed together, Christopher says "I'm rededicating myself, right down the line." "Right Down the Line" is the title of another Gerry Rafferty song from the 1978 album City to City.
- The song played when Richie is reading the paper, and then is joined by Paulie and Silvio, is "Dancing in the Dark", sung by Tony Bennett on the 1993 album Steppin' Out.
- The song played when Sean and Matt approach Tony in the Bada Bing's men's room is "Lap Dance" by the Jon Spencer Blues Explosion.
- The song played when Furio and his partner collect from Sean and Matt is "Up 'N Da Club" by 2nd II None. Since 2022 the song was popularized as an internet meme among fans of the show.
- The song played as Richie and Carmela talk (while the maid and her husband are picking up a television) is "Fields of Gold" by Sting.
- The song played when Matt and Sean sit at the Bada Bing, reflecting on their status, is "Fuck With Your Head" by DJ Rap.

== Filming locations ==
Listed in order of first appearance:

- North Caldwell, New Jersey
- Montclair, New Jersey
- Lodi, New Jersey
- Newark, New Jersey
- Satin Dolls in Lodi, New Jersey
- Satriale's Pork Store in Kearny, New Jersey
- Kearny, New Jersey

Additionally, Turtle Back Zoo, Willowbrook Mall, and Short Hills are mentioned.
