= Bust Out =

- The Sopranos episode
- Episode no.: Season 2 Episode 10
- Directed by: John Patterson
- Written by: Frank Renzulli; Robin Green; Mitchell Burgess
- Cinematography by: Phil Abraham
- Production code: 210
- Original air date: March 19, 2000
- Running time: 59 minutes

Episode chronology
| ← Previous "From Where to Eternity" | Next → "House Arrest" |
- The Sopranos season 2

"Bust Out" is the 23rd episode of the HBO original series The Sopranos and the 10th of the show's second season. It was written by Frank Renzulli, Robin Green, and Mitchell Burgess and directed by John Patterson, and originally aired on March 19, 2000.

== Starring ==
- James Gandolfini as Tony Soprano
- Lorraine Bracco as Dr. Jennifer Melfi
- Edie Falco as Carmela Soprano
- Michael Imperioli as Christopher Moltisanti *
- Dominic Chianese as Corrado Soprano, Jr.
- Vincent Pastore as Pussy Bonpensiero
- Steven Van Zandt as Silvio Dante *
- Tony Sirico as Paulie Gualtieri
- Robert Iler as Anthony Soprano, Jr.
- Jamie-Lynn Sigler as Meadow Soprano
- Drea de Matteo as Adriana La Cerva *
- David Proval as Richie Aprile
- Aida Turturro as Janice Soprano
- Nancy Marchand as Livia Soprano

* = credit only

=== Guest starring ===
- John Ventimiglia as Artie Bucco

==== Also guest starring ====
- Robert Patrick as David Scatino
- Marisa Redanty as Christine Scatino
- Joe Penny as Victor Musto
- Lillo Brancato, Jr. as Matt Bevilaqua
- Louis Lombardi as Skip Lipari
- Federico Castelluccio as Furio Giunta
- Paul Herman as Beansie Gaeta
- David Margulies as Neil Mink
- Mitch Holleman as Boy at Mall
- Adrian Martinez as Ramone
- Olga Merediz as Fran
- Matt Servitto as Agent Harris

== Synopsis ==
Dr. Melfi tells Tony that he seems scared. A witness has identified him as one of two men leaving the scene of Matt's murder, but after a press report that the murder is Mafia-related, the witness retracts his statement. Pussy has another acrimonious meeting with Agent Skip Lipari and denies that he was the second man. Lipari orders him to record Tony admitting to the murder.

Tony and Richie subject Davey Scatino's store to a "bust out", using the store's line of credit to buy expensive merchandise with which to pay off his gambling debt, and doing so until the store goes bankrupt. Tony points out to Davey that the Executive Game was fair and that Davey could just as easily have won, but Davey is not consoled and is close to suicide.

Richie is dissatisfied with the cut he is getting from Davey's store, and with the deal he has with the DiMeo family's sanitation business. Egged on by Janice, he approaches Uncle Junior with the idea of eliminating Tony. Junior admonishes him, but Richie points out that Junior himself planned to kill Tony the previous year. Tony visits Beansie in the hospital and insists on giving him $50,000.

Davey's wife does not know about his disastrous debt to Tony. She is friends with Carmela and introduces her to her brother, Victor Musto. Carmela and Victor, who is recently widowed, are immediately attracted to each other. He is a housepainter, and she engages him to wallpaper part of her house. They suddenly kiss when they are alone in a small powder room. They agree that he will come alone the next day, without his assistant. That evening, Victor meets Davey, who confesses that he is ruined, in debt to Tony. The next day, only Victor's assistant comes to Carmela's house.

In therapy with Melfi, Tony claims he is fine with going to jail, but only once his kids are grown, so that he is not an absentee father. One night in the kitchen, drunk, he reminds Meadow that he loves her. After some cruel words to A.J., Tony feels bad and tries to get closer to him. At first he resists, but they are happy together, speeding on Tony's boat.

== Title reference ==
- A "bust out" is a fraud tactic, commonly used in the organized crime world, wherein a business' assets and lines of credit are exploited and exhausted to the point of insolvency. Richie and Tony profit from busting out Davey Scatino's sporting goods store in this episode.
- "Bust out" is also a poker term that Poker News defines as: "To lose all your chips and thus be eliminated from a tournament." It was Davey Scatino's "bust out" in Tony's Executive Poker Game that led to the bust out of his sporting goods store.

== Cultural references ==
- In bed, Carmela is reading Memoirs of a Geisha.
- Livia mentions Rose Kennedy, the wealthy matriarch of the Kennedy family.
- When Richie visits Junior at his home, Junior is watching the CBS daytime soap opera The Bold and the Beautiful.
- Carmela tells Tony about a Harvard study examining the importance of the father-son relationship she read about in Time.
- Tony mentions "The Scorpion and the Frog" to David Scatino.
- At home, the eyewitness is reading Anarchy, State, and Utopia, by Robert Nozick.
- Richie tells Janice that Mafia rules dictate that an underling cannot kill a boss. She responds, "Tell that to Paul Castellano", referring to the assassination of Castellano by John Gotti.
- A.J. is shown playing the Dreamcast game Flag to Flag.

== Music ==
- The piano instrumental playing at Nuovo Vesuvio during lunch with Carmela and Christine Scatino is "Cast Your Fate to the Wind".
- The song "Con te partirò" by Andrea Bocelli appears for the third time this season, played as Carmela thinks about and receives a phone call from the handyman. This song was especially prominent in "Commendatori", playing (among other places) when Carmela and her friends discussed hoping to be free of their husbands.
- The music playing during the scene wherein the witness realizes the murder victim was a Mafia associate is the second movement from Anton Webern's Variations for Piano, Op. 27.
- When Carmela is preparing the food for her lunch with Vic Musto, "You're Still the One" by Shania Twain is playing in the background.
- The song played over the end credits is "Wheel in the Sky" by Journey; this song also played in the scene of painters wallpapering the Sopranos' dining room.

== Filming locations ==
Listed in order of first appearance:

- Garden State Plaza in Paramus, New Jersey
- Ramsey Outdoor in Paramus, New Jersey
- North Caldwell, New Jersey
- Washington Middle School in Harrison, New Jersey
- Long Island City, Queens
- Satin Dolls in Lodi, New Jersey
- Great Kills, Staten Island
