= Rockaway Valley Railroad =

Former railroad in New Jersey

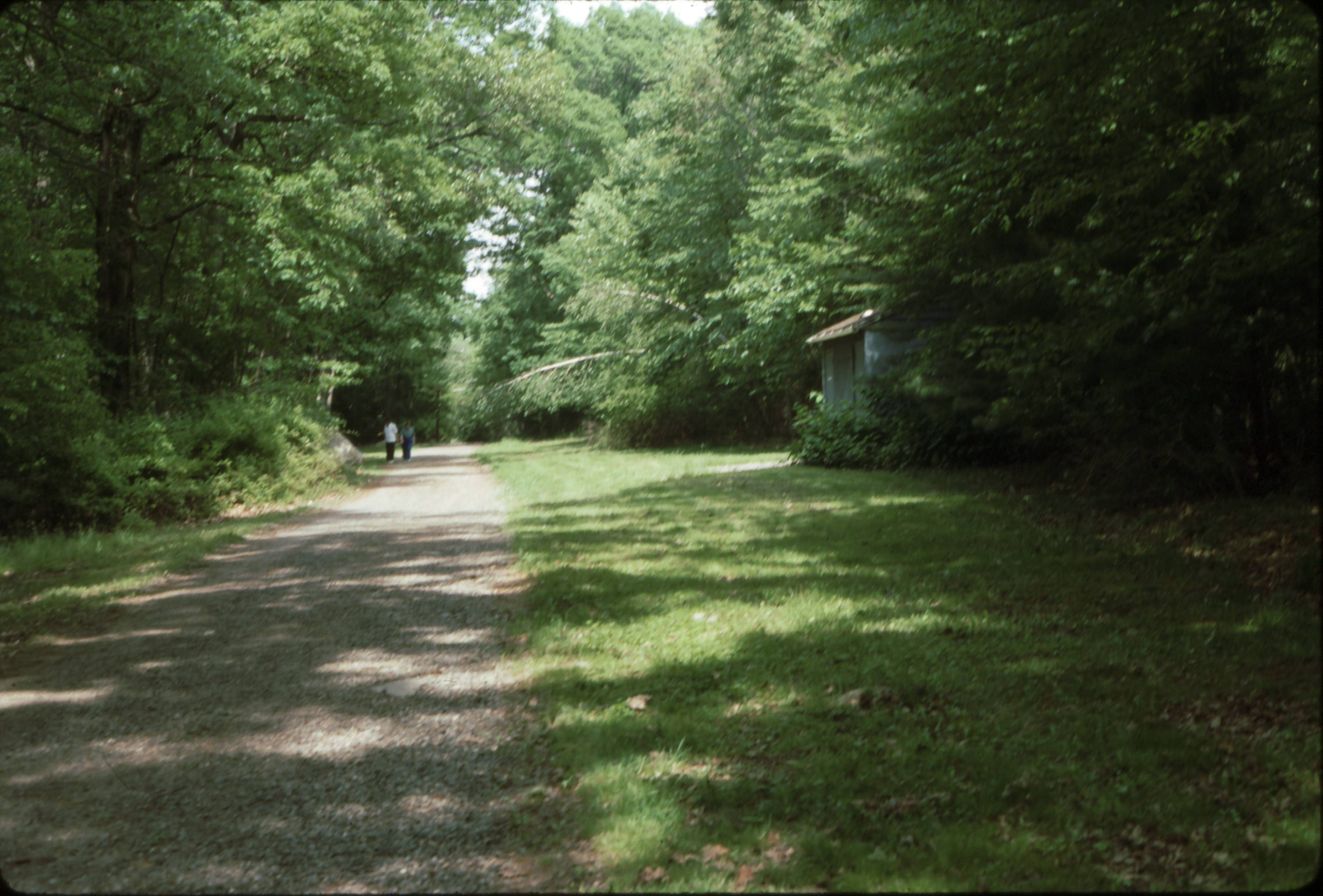
- The Mendham, New Jersey station site looking north along the right-of-way towards Watnong. The station was located about where the small building is in this June 1994 photo. The last freight car on the railroad was delivered here on June 10, 1914.

Overview
- Status: Abandoned (1917)
- Locale: New Jersey
- Termini: White House; Watnong

History
- Opened: 1888
- Closed: 1917

Technical
- Line length: 25 mi (40.2 km)
- Number of tracks: 1
- Character: Surface
- Track gauge: 1,435 mm (4 ft 8 1/2 in)
- Operating speed: unknown possibly 30-35 MPH

The Rockaway Valley Railroad, also known as the New Jersey and Pennsylvania Railroad and informally known as the "Rock-A-Bye Baby", was an American short line. Built from a connection with the Central Railroad of New Jersey (CNJ) mainline in White House Station, New Jersey, the railroad traveled north to Watnong, New Jersey (a community in the northern section of Morris Township, New Jersey about two miles northwest of the center of Morristown, New Jersey), a total distance of approximately 25 miles (about 40 km). The railroad was constructed between 1888 and 1892, predominantly to ship peaches from orchards that were abundant along the southern part of the line, but it also carried passengers and other freight along the entire route. The Rockaway Valley Railroad (RVRR) ceased operation in 1914 and was abandoned in 1917. Much of the old railbed is now part of a rail-trail.

== Origin ==
During the railroad building craze of the late 19th century a number of railroads of various sizes were built in the United States that probably should never have been built. The RVRR was one of these railroads. Indeed, from the beginning the RVRR suffered from a number of problems that sooner or later would seal its doom: namely, it was poorly financed; it served no large cities, and only ran to the outskirts of one medium-sized town; it had no significant industry located along its route; it relied heavily on a seasonal and unpredictable crop for revenue; it interchanged with only one railroad, which held it "captive"; it was built as cheaply as possible; and it was poorly maintained.

The Delaware, Lackawanna and Western Railroad investigated building a line from Morristown, New Jersey to Mendham, New Jersey (basically the northern half of the RVRR as built), estimating that it would cost $27,000 a mile or more to build, but declined to do so, not so much because of the cost but because it thought that the extension would never be profitable. The chief engineer of the RVRR, John E.V. Melick, on the other hand, stated that the line could be built for $15,000 or less a mile and would be immensely profitable. Ultimately, in their own ways, both Melick and the Lackawanna would be proven right: Melick, in that he could build the RVRR for $15,000 per mile; and the Lackawanna, in that the extra $12,000 per mile was justified, and, most importantly, that the line would never be profitable. (As chief engineer, Melick would also go on to build one more railroad, the Morristown and Erie Railway (built as the Whippany River Railroad), a line that the RVRR had hoped one day to link up with in Morristown. The M&E's original line was so poorly engineered by Melick that the entire line had to be relocated and rebuilt three years later. The M&E continues to operate until this day.) The RVRR, whose engineering problems bore a striking resemblance to those of the M&E's, wouldn't be as fortunate.

== Planning and construction ==
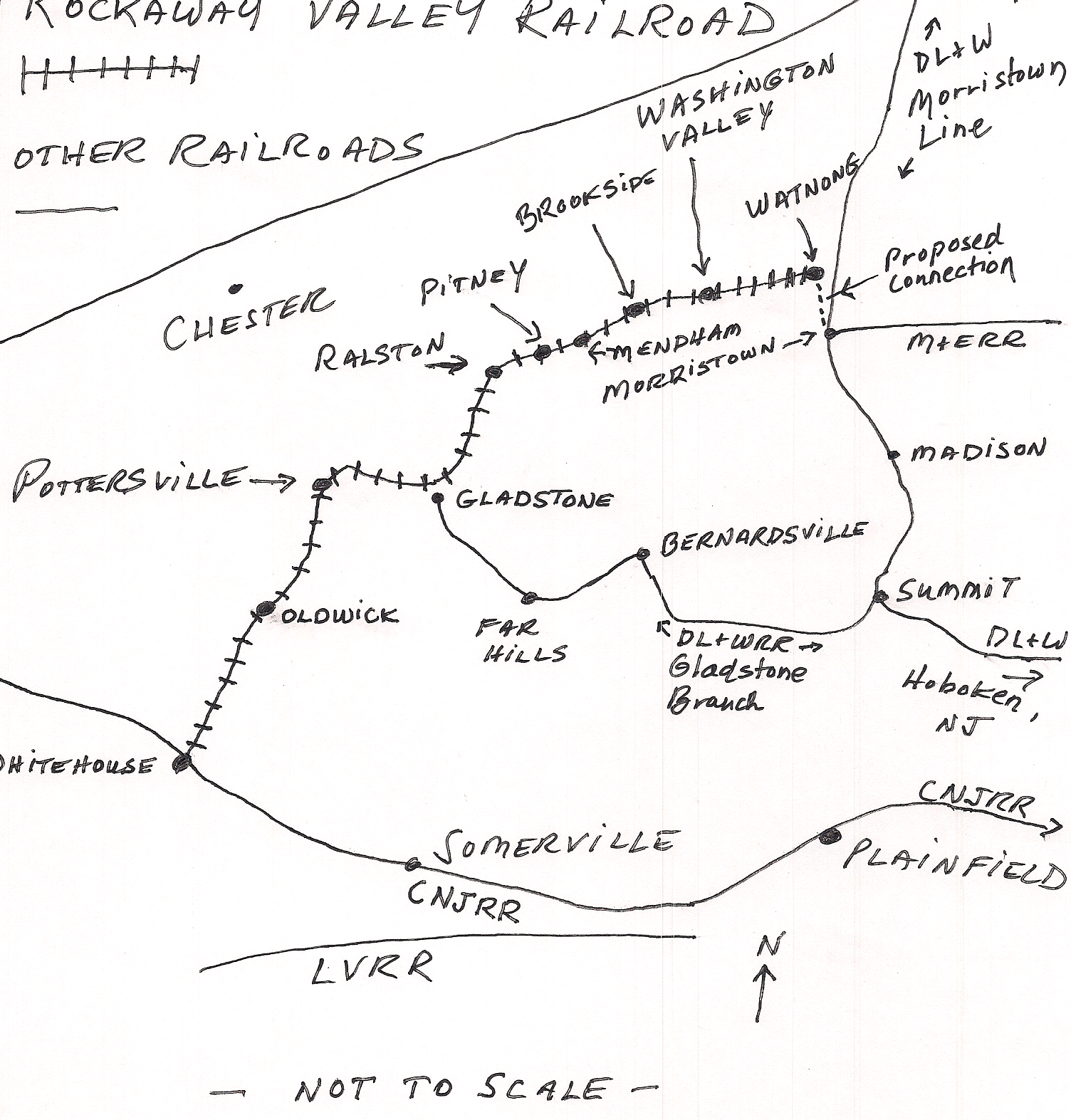
A map of the Rockaway Valley Railroad. Note that the railroad bridged several large railroads.

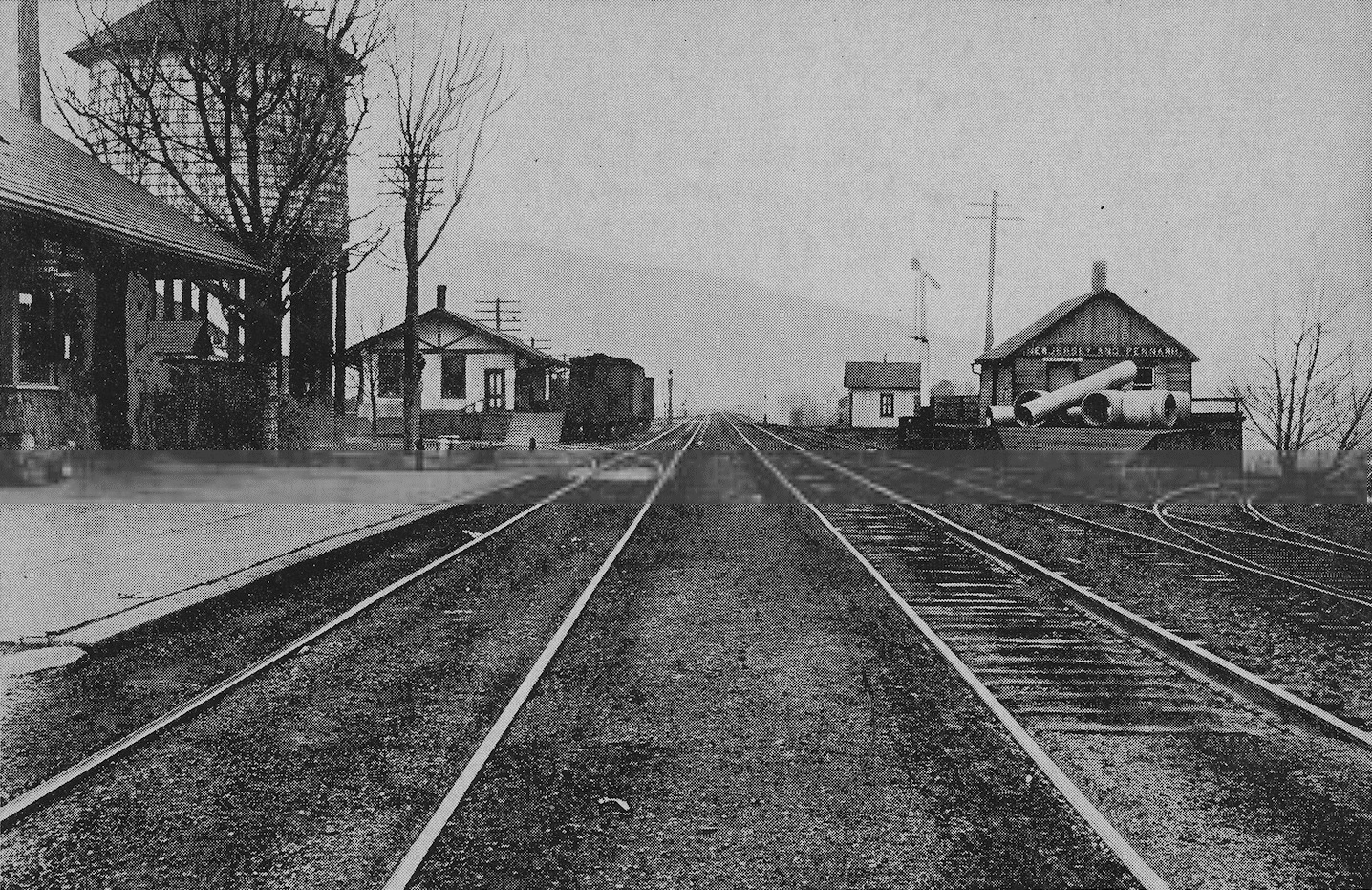
Looking west at Whitehouse station toward RVRR station on right across from still standing CNJ (now New Jersey Transit) station at near left, 1915. The sign on the RVRR station reads "New Jersey and Penna RR," the name the RVRR carried for most of the last half of its existence.

The RVRR was built in stages, from south to north, as funding became available. By February, 1888, Melick had obtained sufficient money, $60,000 from sales of stock, to begin building the southernmost 4 miles (6.4 km) from White House to New Germantown (Oldwick, New Jersey). This was based on Melick's original $15,000 per mile estimate. Much of this funding came from local peach growers who stood to gain from a rail connection to transport their perishable crop to market. The initial grading began on May 17, 1888. All work was performed using picks, shovels and wheel barrows. A steam locomotive, an old 4-4-0, was christened as the P.W. Melick (John E.V. Melick's father), and was put to work constructing the line, hauling railroad ties and railroad track. Although the line to Watnong would not be fully completed until August 1892, revenue started flowing into the railroad's coffers in 1888, as gross income for that year amounted to a modest $992.46.

In 1889, the railroad pushed northward another 4 miles (6.4 km) to Pottersville, New Jersey. This section, built as the Rockaway Valley Extension Railroad, required that $70,000 in stock be sold. Black River Falls, an early tourist attraction, was located a short distance from the depot in Pottersville. Fortunately for the railroad, the first 8 miles to Pottersville was almost entirely flat and posed no significant engineering challenges. The next 4-mile (6.4 km) extension, from Pottersville north to Peapack, New Jersey, however, would be different. This section would feature an L-shaped climb up a 2%-3.5% grade, with a 4% drop on the other side of the hill, and a 400-foot-long (120 m), 25-foot-high (7.6 m) wooden trestle, the only significant structure on the mainline of the railroad. Starting late in 1889, and then after the Spring thaw in 1890, work on the Rockaway Valley Peapack Extension Railroad was performed. The railroad would bypass the Lackawanna's Peapack station by nearly a half a mile (roughly 1 km). It's not entirely clear why Melick chose to avoid Peapack, but more than likely cost was the reason, as this section was funded for only $70,000, and any significant deviation in route in an easterly direction towards Peapack would have required much more funding from stockholders.

It was at this point in time that talks between RVRR backers and the Lackawanna Railroad took place in the hope of luring the Lackawanna's deep pockets into building a line from Morristown to a connection with the RVRR at Mendham. Unbeknownst to the RVRR's backers, however, the Lackawanna had already surveyed numerous routes to Mendham and had rejected all of them. The Lackawanna's management—or more exactly, the Morris and Essex Railroad's management—would pay lip service to building the line, but would never seriously pursue the project.

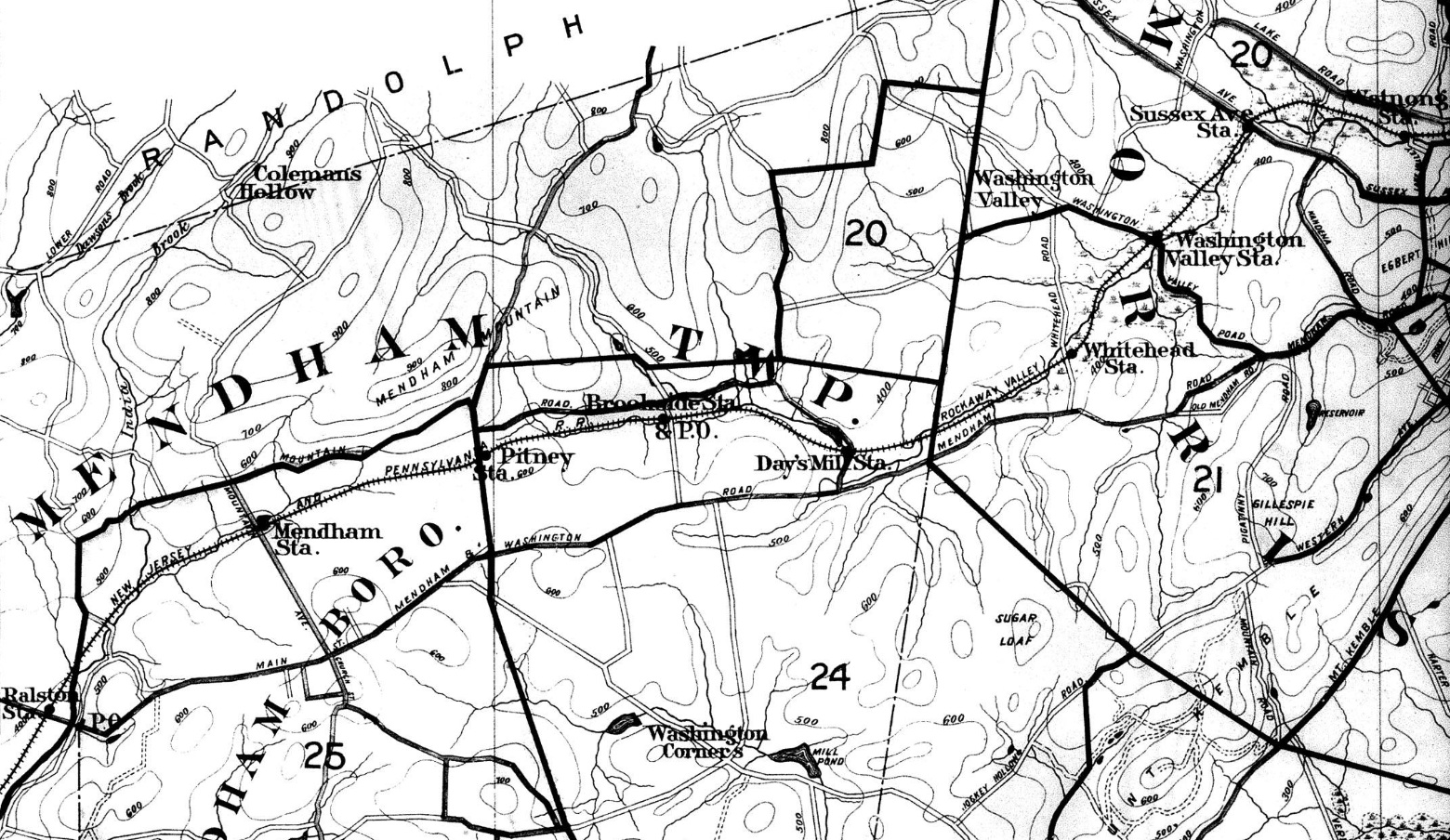
1910 map showing RVRR line in Morris County, from Ralston station to Watnong station

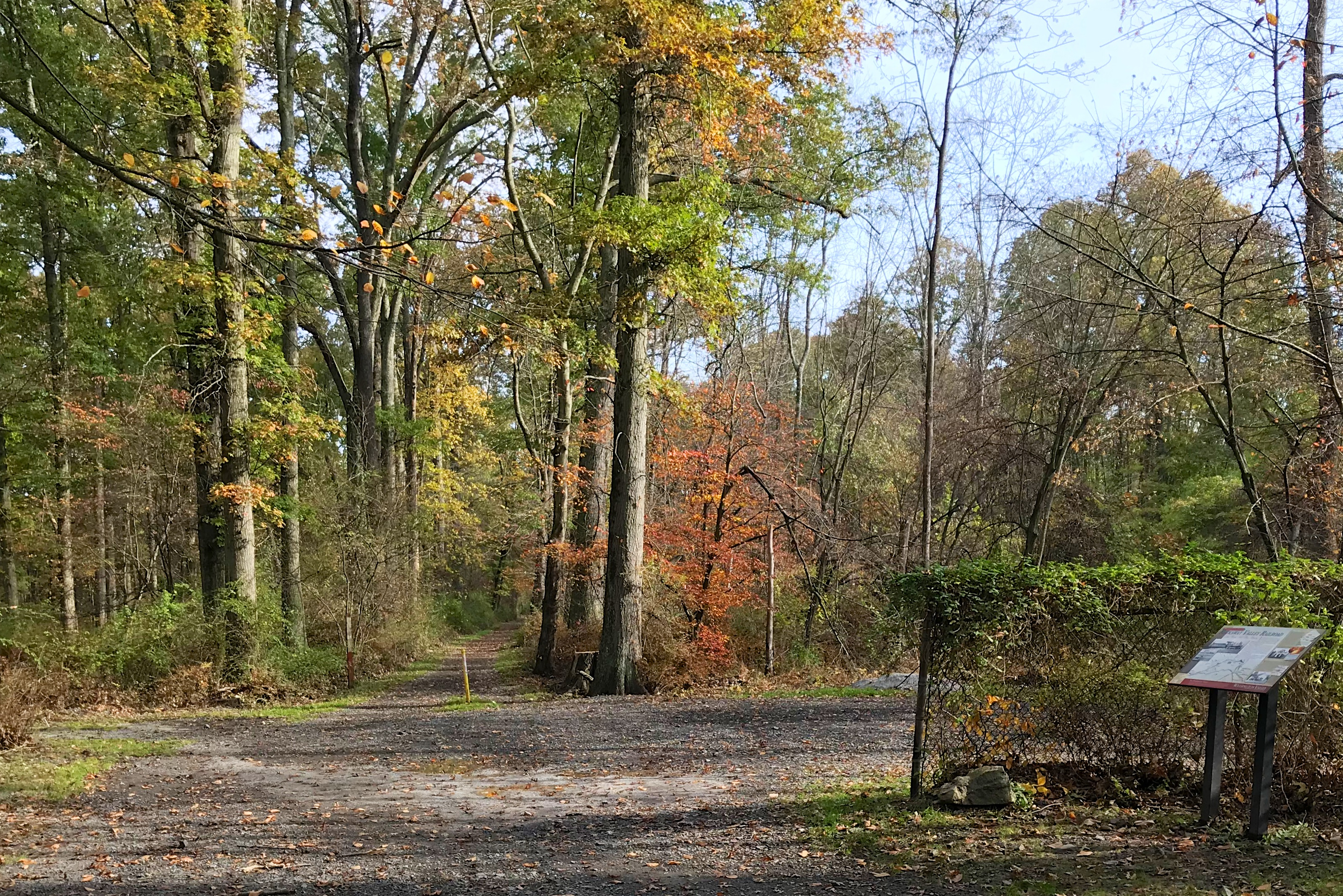
Site of the Washington Valley station, now along the Patriots' Path.

As such, construction on the extension from Peapack to Mendham, New Jersey started on August 26, 1890, under the Rockaway Valley Mendham Extension Railroad Company, although the company wouldn't be legally incorporated for another 3 weeks. The first train to Mendham ran on June 25, 1891. Engineering-wise the section to Mendham, which also passed through the town of Ralston, New Jersey, was relatively unremarkable by RVRR standards, although the 1.8% grade northward to Mendham would have been significant for many other railroads.

The RVRR located its Watnong depot on the northern bank of the Whippany River on the east side of Lake Valley Road. On a rail profile map the "final" 7 miles from Mendham to Watnong (2 miles from Morristown) appears as a gently downhill ride into the county seat of Morris County, New Jersey. Built as the Rockaway Valley Morristown Extension Railroad, the first train arrived in Watnong in early August 1892. Of all the sections of RVRR right-of-way, this would prove to be the most problematic, as the last several miles into Watnong traversed a swamp. For most railroads this would have required that extra fill material and ballast be placed in order to build up the right-of-way well above the surrounding water table. But the RVRR constructed the section through Washington Valley (near Milepost 22), very much like every other section on the railroad. The result: this section, particularly during wet periods, would almost literally sink into the muck.

== Consequences of poor construction ==
Derailments were common on the RVRR over the years, although none appear to have been serious. The speed limit along the line was never documented, but it is unlikely that given the track condition, and the small locomotives that the railroad used, that trains ever exceeded 30–35 miles per hour.

The fact that Chief Engineer Melick built the line cheaply and poorly should not have come as any surprise as Melick had no formal training as a civil engineer and knew very little about railroading either. Indeed, he seemed much better suited in his role as a marketeer, than as a builder, of the RVRR project. Apparently, the allure of running a railroad was greater to Melick than any desire to master the key financial aspects of rail operations. To emphasize this point, in 1907, some 17 years after the railroad opened for business, the New Jersey Railroad Commissioners inspected the railroad and issued a report that was highly critical of the engineering of the RVRR. In part, the report stated:

The road extends from White House to Watnong, a distance of 24 1/2 miles with 2 miles of sidings. It is a very crooked line with heavy grades and curves, built upon the same plan as a trolley, up and down, without regard to grade or line. [The ruling grade was 4% near Peapack, New Jersey.] The track is laid with mostly 50 and 56 pound [per yard; 25 and 28 kg/m] rail, badly worn [at the time of the report, 80-to-90-pound-per-yard (40 to 45 kg/m) rail was considered to be standard]. The road is ballasted for about 4 miles with cinders in small quantities, the remainder is mud, and for miles ties lie on top of the ground with no ballast. Cuts and fills are light. Two mixed trains are run each day on which passengers are carried. The road's equipment includes one old coach and an engine which has been furnished by the Central Railroad of New Jersey for 6 dollars a day. The superintendent of the road is doing all he can to maintain the road with the means at his command.

As a result of this inspection, the railroad's speed limit was lowered to 18 miles per hour, and 10 miles per hour over all but the shortest bridges. The Commissioners indicated that 3,500 railroad ties be replaced on the line and that all bridges be reinforced. Many of the bridges would eventually be reinforced, some of this work oddly occurring after the railroad was closed in 1913. Future inspections in 1908 and 1910 were equally critical of the physical plant of the railroad, and more tilework was demanded, but the RVRR had bigger problems to deal with, including meeting payroll and preventing the railroad from entering bankruptcy.

== Extension into Morristown ==
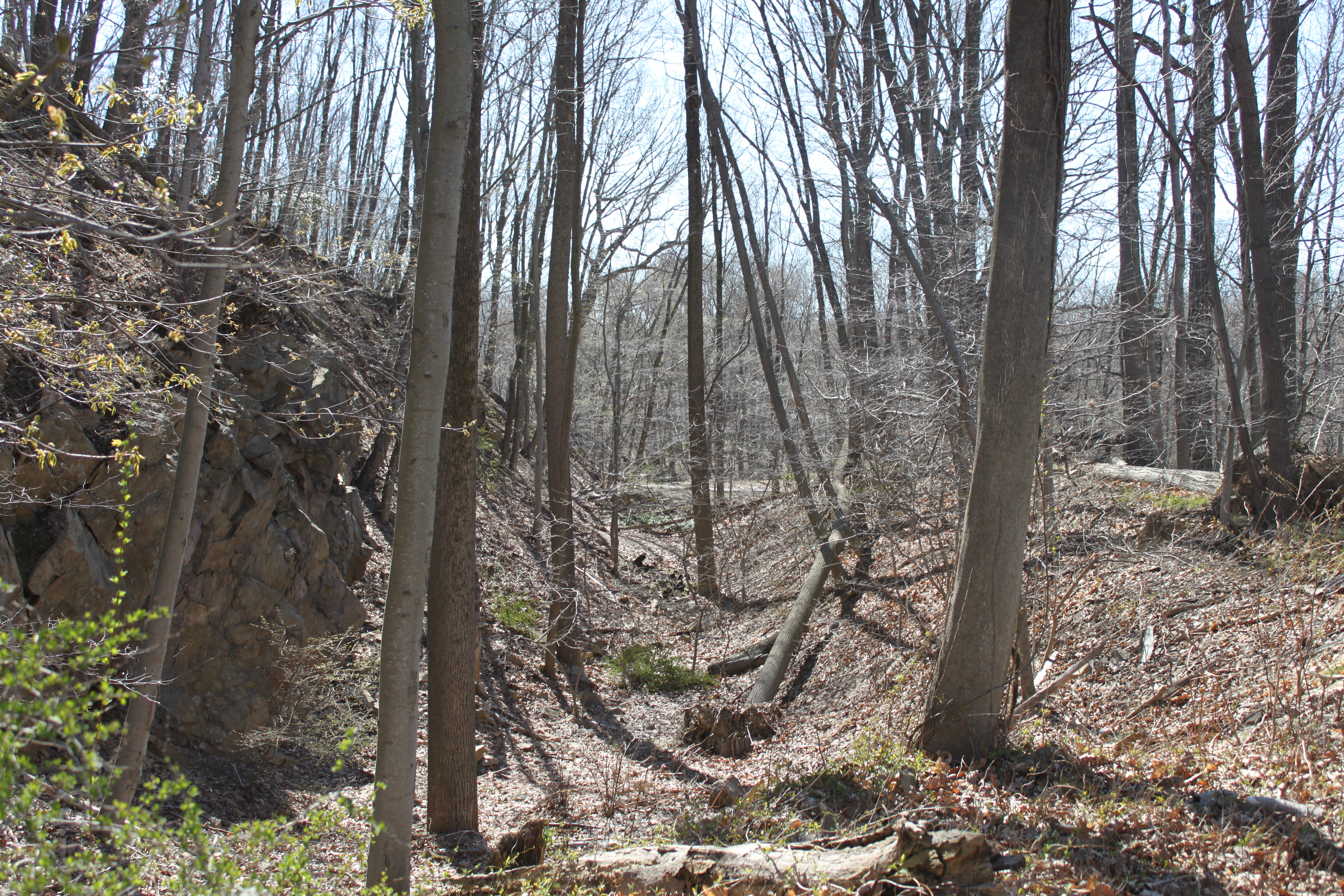
The rock cut on the Morristown Extension near Lake Road in Morris Township, New Jersey, seen in April 2014. This extension north of Watnong was never completed. The photo faces south towards Watnong, which is several hundred yards (meters) away and off to the right.

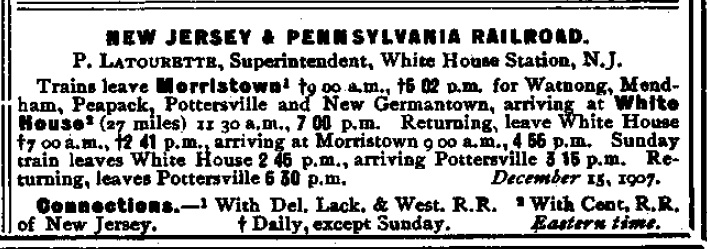
The entry for the RVRR -- now known as the New Jersey & Pennsvlvania Railroad -- in the January 1910 Official Guide of the Railways, showing its daily passenger train schedule and an apparently aspirational connection in Morristown.

In spite of the RVRR's growing financial problems, the railroad pushed its plan to complete its line into Morristown. The hope was to connect to the Morristown and Erie Railway, which terminated two miles from the northern terminus of the RVRR at Watnong, or to connect with the Morris County Traction Company in Morristown. There was even talk of extending the line to Montclair, New Jersey, or with Greystone Park Psychiatric Hospital in Morris Plains, New Jersey. These proposals were unrealistic given the railroad's financial position, but it didn't stop the RVRR from starting construction on the final segment to Morristown in October 1910. Perhaps it was believed that if the final section were completed that it would reverse the railroad's fortunes.

Difficulties, both financial and geological, however, conspired against this section from ever being completed. The first mile above Watnong would prove to be an engineering nightmare and would require the building of a line that resembled a camel's hump, with Speedwell Avenue at the top of the hump. On either side of the Speedwell Avenue "hump" lay a half-mile of rock that would require the use of blasting to obtain an 8% grade, far in excess of any grade on the RVRR.

In the end, all construction on the extension was halted by 1912. There just wasn't any money left, and the railroad couldn't meet its payroll. As it would turn out, standard gauge tracks were never laid upon the extension (only narrow gauge), and dreams of a bigger RVRR never materialized. Had the railroad managed to delay abandonment and expanded to Morristown, inroads by trucks during the 1920s would have eventually killed it anyway even if Melick's construction practices hadn't already effectively done the same thing.

== Financial problems ==
A synopsis of the RVRR's financial woes would fill a small volume, but essentially the railroad's problems were related to a combination of inadequate financing and inadequate income. Indeed, the "good" years never quite made up for the bad years. And after 1900 (and particularly after 1904), due to the San Jose Scale, which killed thousands of peach trees, there was very little in the way of peaches being shipped via the RVRR. This was a severe blow to whatever financial stability was left, as the annual peach crop, although never truly dependable, was the railroad's raison d'être. (In 1894, an all-time record of 324 carloads of peaches—243,000 baskets—were shipped. By 1905, this would have dropped to almost zero.) The railroad's second largest freight item, Anthracite coal, never amounted to more than about 20% of the railroad company's annual income, and was insufficient to stave off receivership.

Adding to the RVRR's instability was its dependency on the Central Railroad of New Jersey. At any point during the RVRR's history, the CNJ could have stepped in and taken over the railroad's operation and saved it; but it never did. Presumably, the CNJ felt that as long as the RVRR continued to pay haulage fees to the CNJ there was no problem. However, when the RVRR's financial situation became dire in 1912–13, the CNJ was the first to demand weekly, instead of monthly, payments from the railroad. This was an ominous sign and the end of the road was not far away.

== Innovative and "homey" operations ==
In spite of all the bad things that the RVRR was known for, the RVRR made the best of what little it had. For example, although the railroad never quite reached Morristown, New Jersey, it offered free freight shipping from its depot in Watnong, which was about 2 miles outside of town. This feature was unique to the RVRR. This proved to be a significant incentive and reportedly the railroad, for as long as it operated, was the predominant freight shipper in Morristown, besting the big railroad in town, the Lackawanna Railroad, by a significant margin.

The RVRR was also known for holding trains for passengers that were late, including school children who used the railroad to commute to school. In one story, a woman, Miss Sue Blackford, recounted a story from about 1900 when she took a trip to New Germantown (now Oldwick, New Jersey) and attempted to pay for her mother and herself with a five-dollar bill. As the conductor didn't have change for so large a bill, he asked where Miss Blackford was staying in New Germantown and the next morning delivered her change in person after walking about a half-mile from his waiting train. Miss Blackford also helped dispel the notion that the moniker "Rock-A-Bye Baby" meant that passengers were gently rocked to sleep aboard the RVRR. She stated, in a letter quoted in Thomas Taber's book on the RVRR, that patrons "were 'rocked', but not to sleep".

== Revival efforts (1913–1917) ==
Although the RVRR was unusual in the way it was built and operated, the heroic efforts that were made to save it after it closed in 1913 were unique. The "last" train to Watnong would run on October 18, 1913, which picked up any freight cars that remained on the railroad, returning them to White House. The railroad's two locomotives were also returned to the Jersey Central, and the railroad's two passenger coaches were placed on a siding. Finally, the railroad's 30 employees were laid off.

Attempts to resuscitate the railroad, however, continued. The major issue would be the Jersey Central's requirement of a $30,000 bond to cover the interchange of cars, the CNJ claiming that the RVRR still owed it $15,000 from its previous operation. This would prove to be an insurmountable obstacle. Even so, one (truly) last train was run on June 10, 1914, which went up to Watnong, also delivering a car of lath to the siding at Mendham (see photo above) This freight car would never move again and would sit in place at Mendham until the railroad itself was finally scrapped. In what would be the first in a litany of seemingly nonsensical improvements to the line, a 135-foot-long (41 m) coaldock (sufficient to dump four cars of coal simultaneously) would be completed near Peapack in 1913, shortly after the line closed; it would never be used.

Over the subsequent two years, more than $65,000 would be spent to rehabilitate the line: replacing ties, reinforcing bridges, and filling in most of the Peapack trestle. Further proposals included the electrification of the line, connecting to the Morristown & Erie at Morristown, and even extending the line eastward to Paterson, New Jersey and southward to Flemington, New Jersey. The latter plan, however, was to have cost an estimated $1 million, and called for the complete abandonment of the RVRR right-of-way, with a new line to be built nearby.

In December 1915, the RVRR was reorganized as the Pennsylvania and New Jersey Railroad. Technically speaking, the Rockaway Valley Railroad had ceased to exist as a corporate entity in December 1904, having been reorganized as the New Jersey and Pennsylvania Railroad at that time. Over its 29 years of corporate life, the RVRR would exist as part of nine different corporations and numerous receiverships. The bizarre coda for this company would finally play out in 1917 with calls of a "sneaky" abandonment.

== Closing up shop ==
The greatest irony, when it comes to the Rockaway Valley, is that the only person ever to make money from the RVRR was Frank B. Allen, the final owner of the line, and the one who sold the railroad for scrap in 1917. It is estimated that Allen netted more than $150,000, and possibly much more, for the 2,200 short tons (2,000 t) of rail due to the inflated scrap value of iron, at upwards of $80 per ton, during World War I. A photo from the era (see New Jersey Skylands magazine link below) shows Allen, a man who was in his seventies at the time, standing in front of his Model T Ford, equipped with flanged wheels that enabled the automobile to ride on the rails, pulling a flat car that was being loaded with rail segments that were being pulled off the railbed.

== Legacy ==
Although the railroad was completely abandoned and all its rail removed in 1917 (the sole exception being a short section near White House that was retained into the 1920s in order to serve a creamery), most of the right-of-way remains intact, much of it publicly or quasi-publicly owned, comprising part of Patriots' Path, as well as a right-of-way carrying fiber-optic cable.

=== Remnants ===
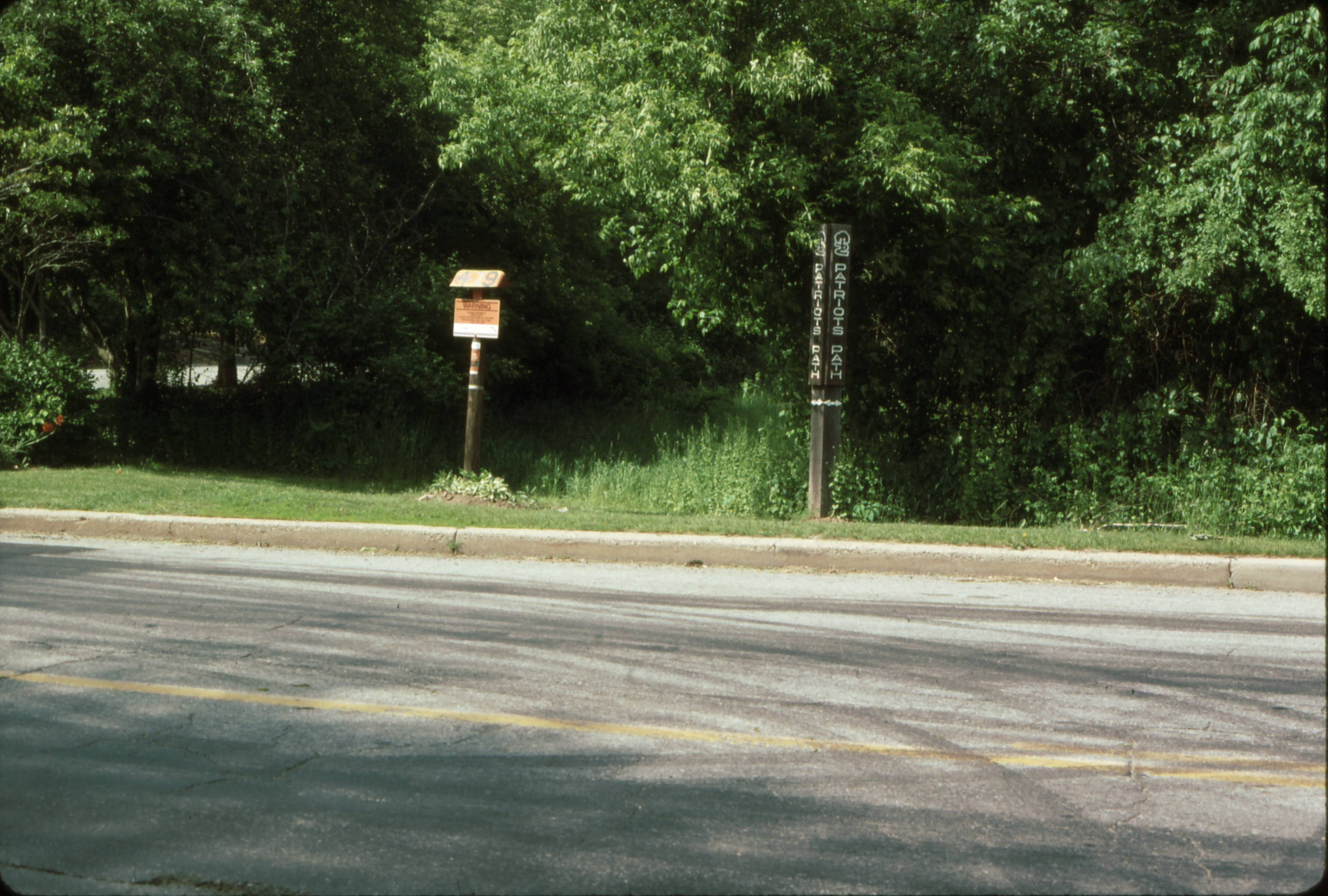
The Ralston, New Jersey station site looking north towards Watnong. The photo, taken in 1994, shows where the RVRR crossed what is now New Jersey County Route 510. In June 1902, an electric-powered rail car ran loose from this location after a mail bag had been thrown into the car, accidentally starting the car. The car traveled some 8 miles north before crashing into a freight car at Watnong. Note the warning sign on the left for the buried cable that now uses the RVRR right-of-way.

Remnants exist at the following locations:

- A small bridge abutment and section of right of way exist in Whitehouse Station.
- Multiple small bridge abutments exist along the line, including some in Tewksbury Township and Mendham.
- Remnants of the old coal dock exist in the Rockabye Meadows Preserve in Gladstone.
- On the never-completed extension to Morristown, a cut exists near Lake Road and a graded section of right-of-way exists just south of Speedwell Lake. On the north side of Lake Road opposite the cut (40°48'48.1"N 74°29'18.4"W) is a mostly buried concrete tunnel and tunnel portal.
- Most of the right-of-way still exists, partially as the Patriots' Path

== Gallery ==
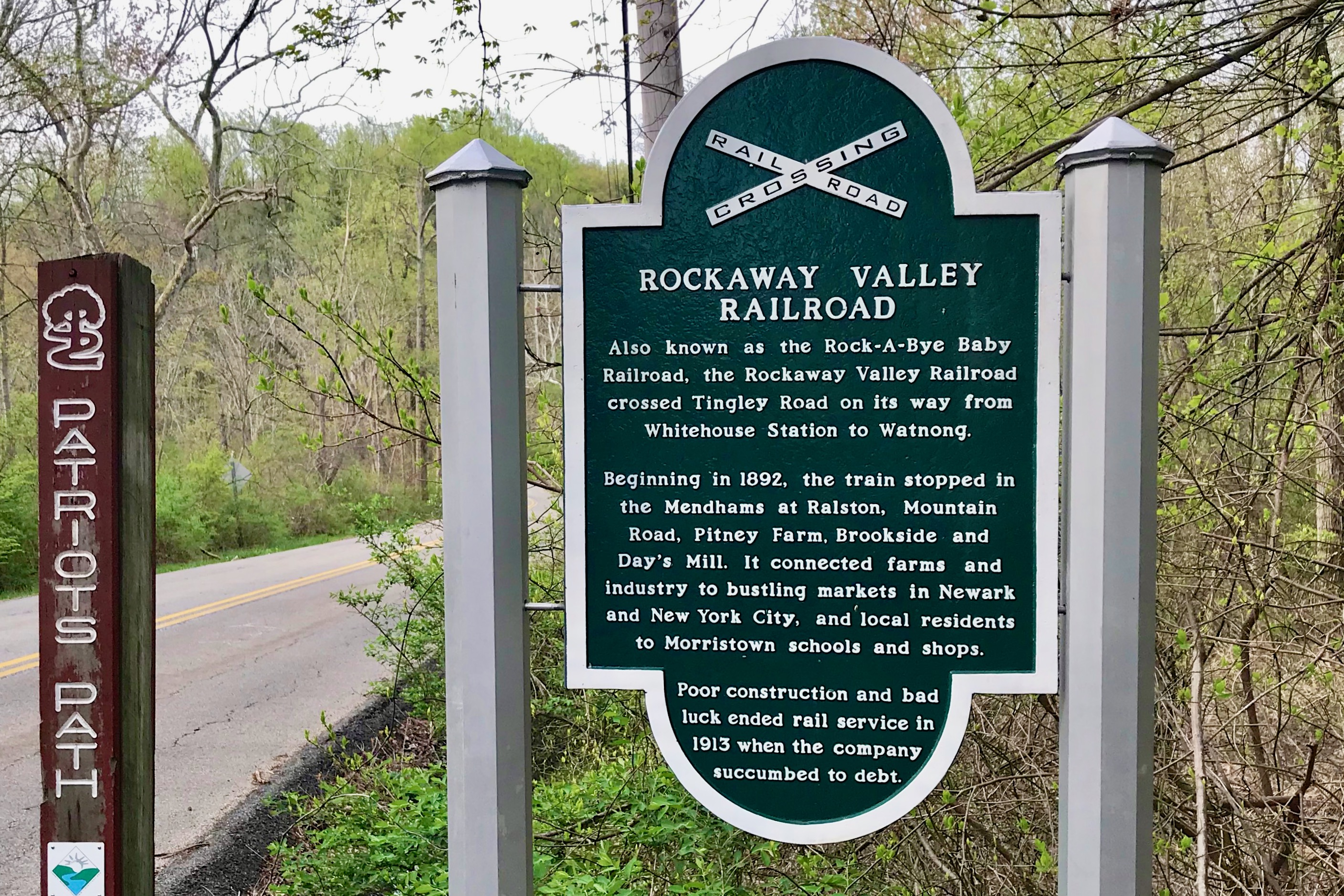
Information sign along the Patriots' Path near Brookside
