= Black River County Park =

Public park in Morris County, New Jersey

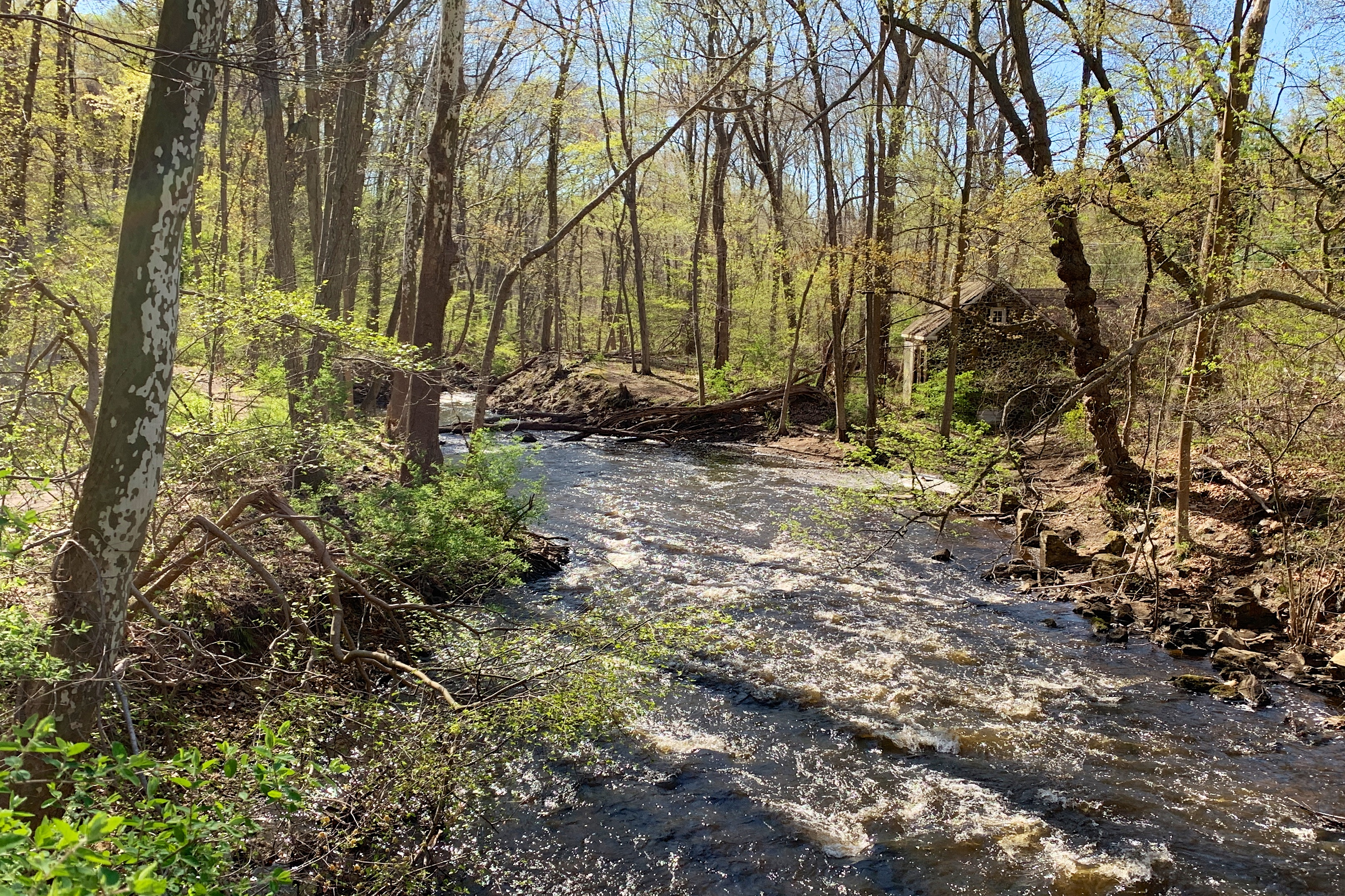
- The Black River in 2019

- Location within Morris County, New Jersey Location within New Jersey Location within the United States
- Location: Chester Township, New Jersey
- Coordinates: 40°45′50″N 74°43′00″W
- Operator: Morris County Parks Commission

The Black River County Park is a public park in Morris County, New Jersey operated by the Morris County Park Commission.

The park covers an area of 560 acres (2.3 km^{2}) along the eastern shore of the Black River and is located between Long Valley and Chester. Its land represents a glacial valley carved by the Black River and some of its tributaries. The park is home to the Nathan Cooper Gristmill, the Elizabeth D. Kay Environmental Center, the Bamboo Brook Outdoor Education Center, and the Willowwood Arboretum.

The land was mined for iron ore during the 19th centuries, and within the park is an old iron mine. In 1883 the Hacklebarney Branch of the High Bridge Railroad, later part of the Central Railroad of New Jersey (CNJ), was built to serve the local iron mines. The railway was abandoned in 1900. The railway trestle has in part become part of a hiking trail along the river. When Alfred and Elizabeth Kay moved from Pittsburgh to the area in 1924 they consolidated land to establish the Hidden River Farm; later some of their land was donated to the park system.

The park is used for hiking, fishing, bird watching as well as for activities through its educational centers. A list of its botanical offering has been collected.

Other parks in the Black River valley are the Black River Wildlife Management Area and the Hacklebarney State Park.

== Gallery ==
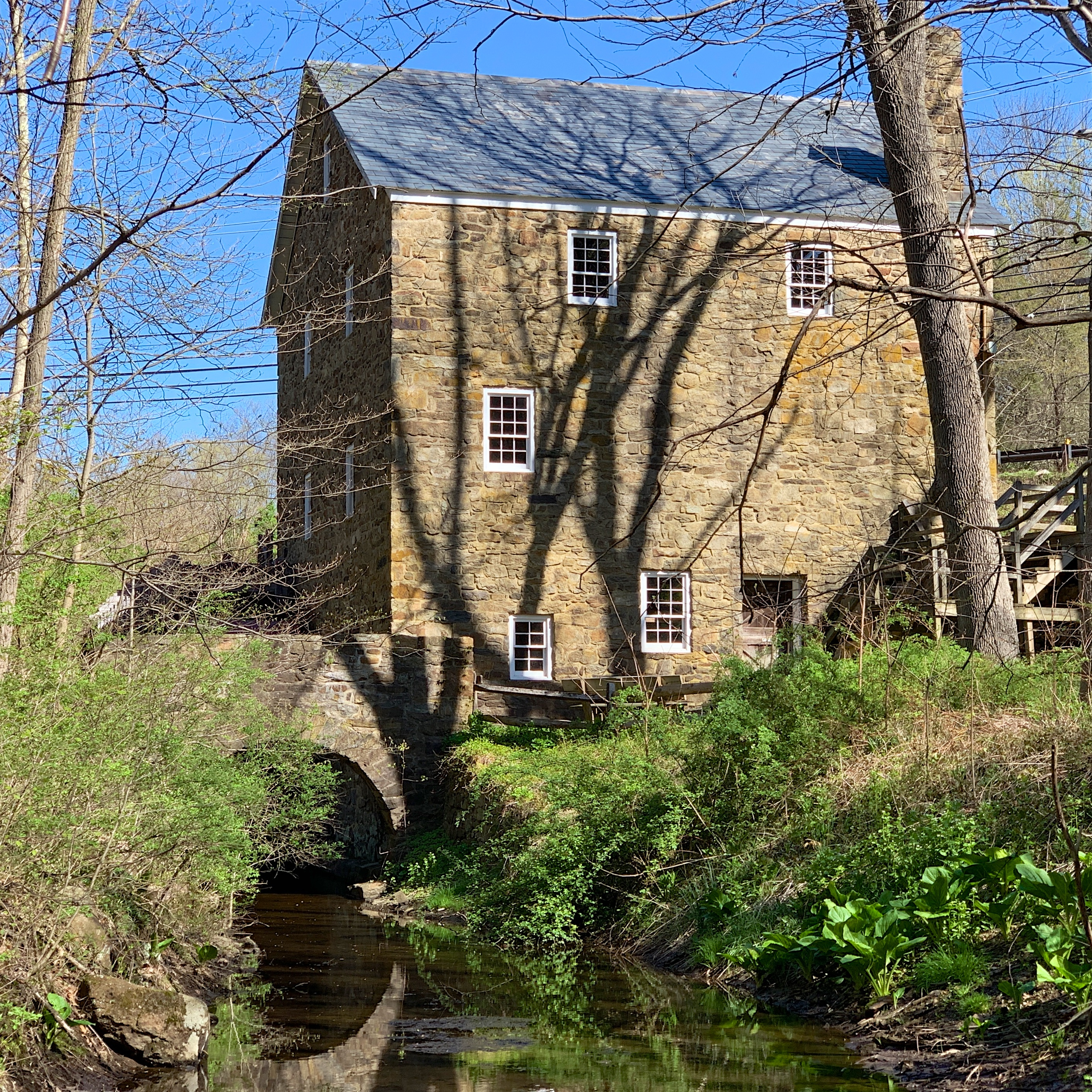
Nathan Cooper Gristmill and mill race

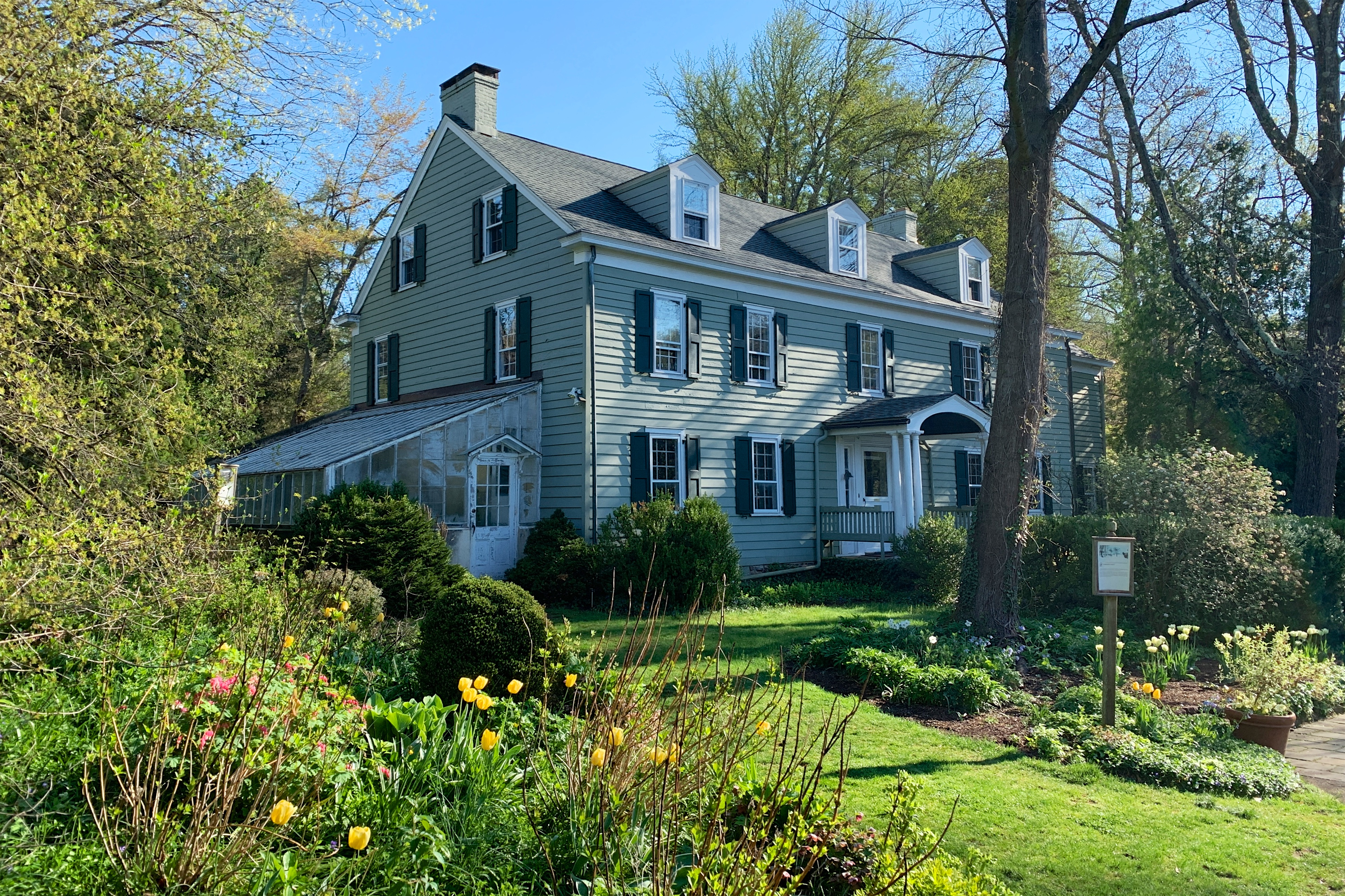
Tubbs House and conservatory at the Willowwood Arboretum

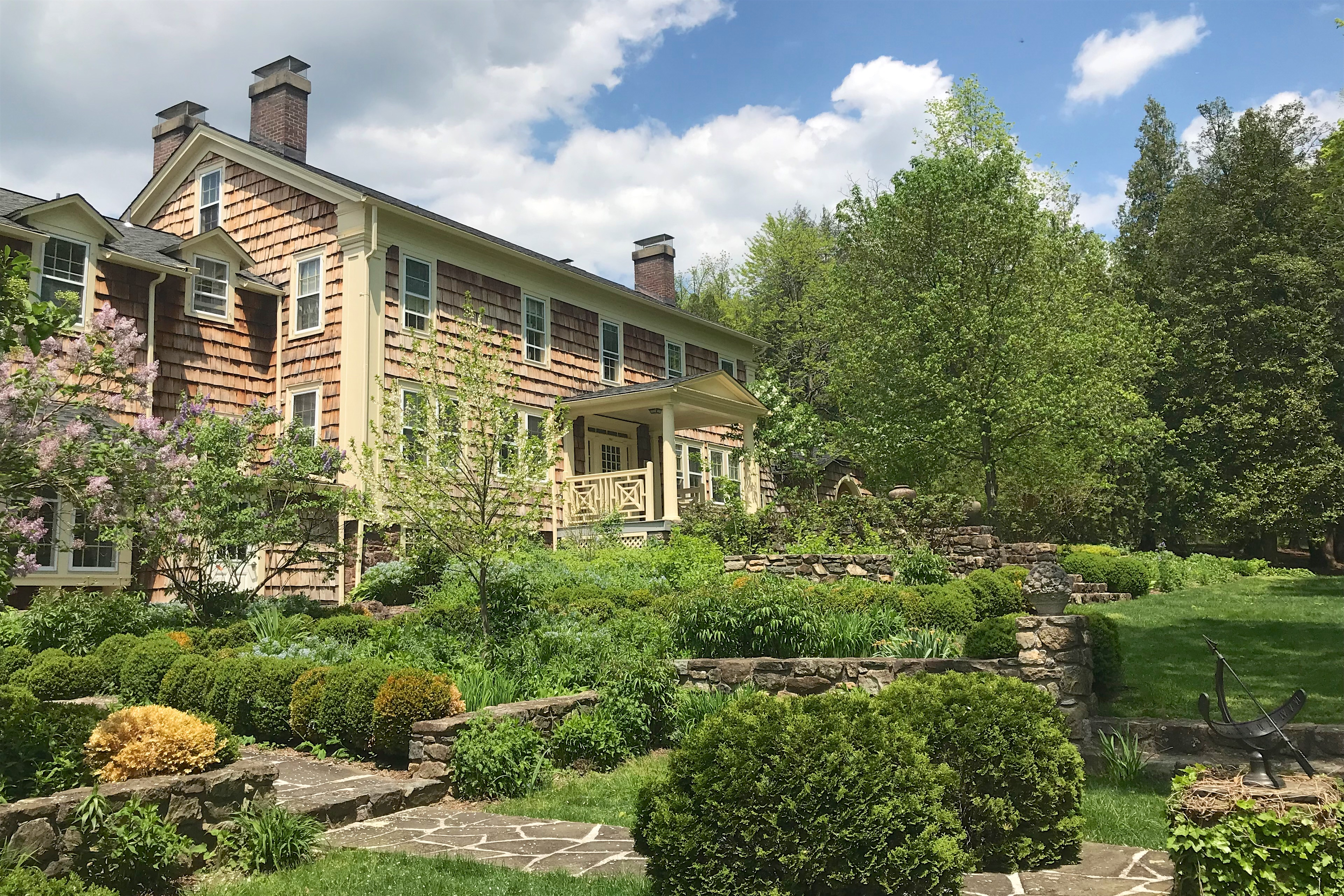
Hutcheson House and garden at the Bamboo Brook Outdoor Education Center

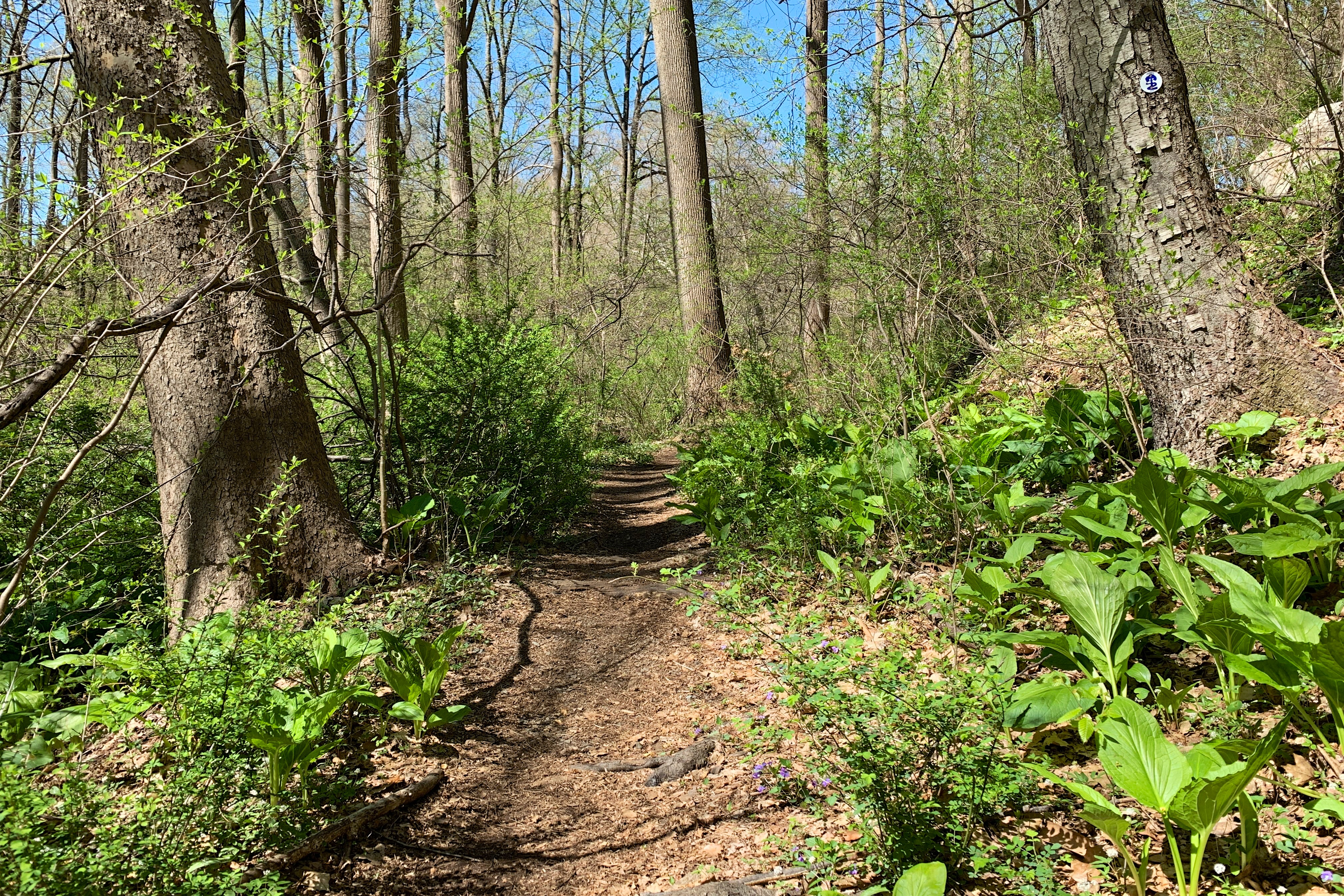
The Patriots' Path by the Black River near the Elizabeth D. Kay Environmental Center
