= Black River (New Jersey) =

River in New Jersey, United States

Coordinates: 40.757603°N 74.732062°W

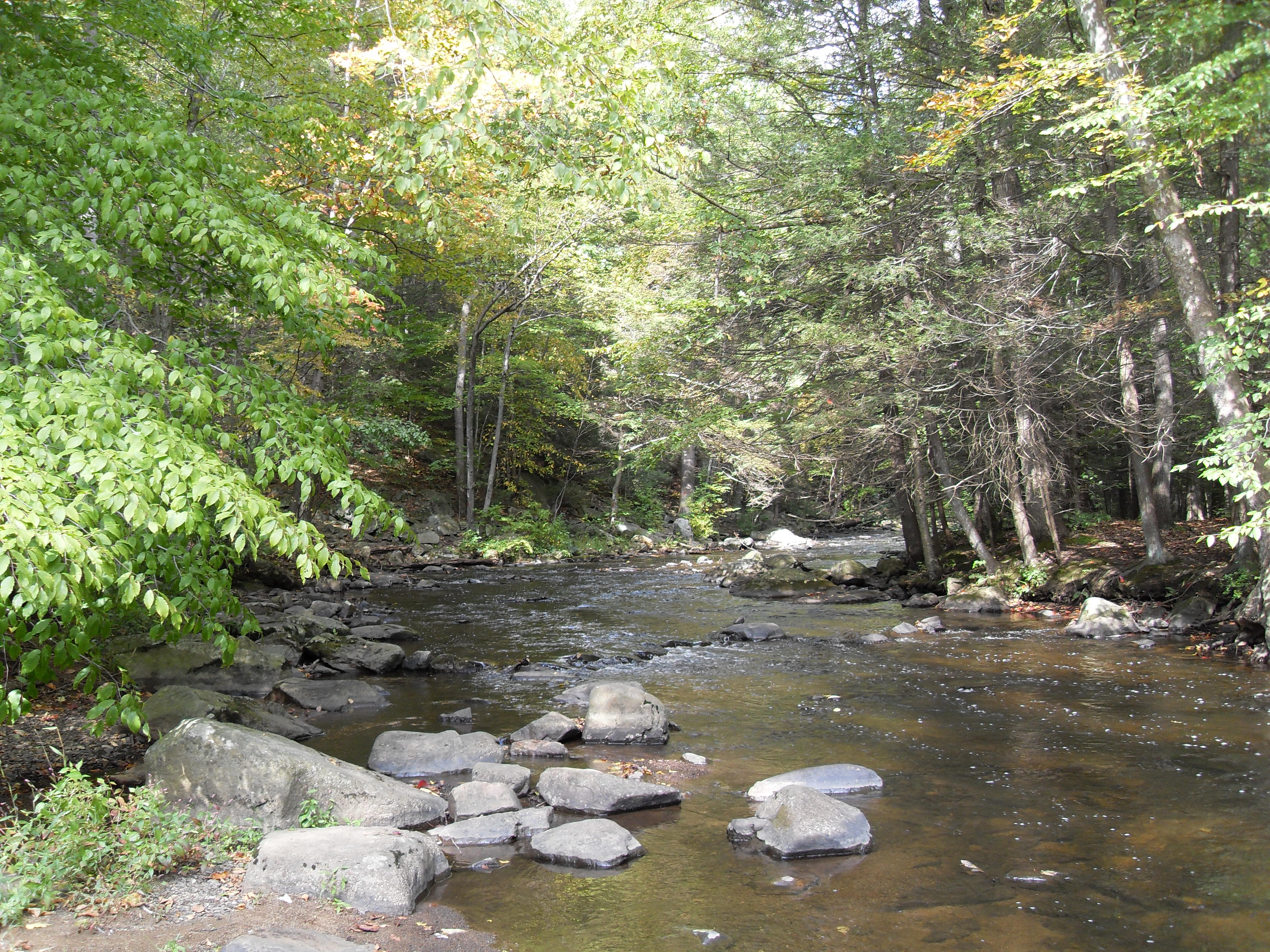
The Black River at the Hacklebarney State Park

The Black River, known as the Lamington River downstream of Pottersville, is a tributary of the North Branch Raritan River in central New Jersey in the United States.

The Black River starts near that of the North Branch Raritan River, several miles west of Morristown, rising out of Sunset Lake in Mine Hill New Jersey. It flows through the Black River Wildlife Management Area, the Black River County Park, and Hacklebarney State Park. It flows through Chester, New Jersey and the town middle school is named after it.

== See also ==
- List of rivers of New Jersey
