= Talking Sopranos =

Podcast about The Sopranos tv series

- Genre: Rewatch
- Country of origin: United States
- Language: English

Cast and voices
- Hosted by: Michael Imperioli; Steve Schirripa

Publication
- No. of episodes: 92

Talking Sopranos is a 92-episode rewatch podcast hosted by Michael Imperioli and Steve Schirripa, based on the long-running HBO television series The Sopranos (1999–2007). Imperioli played Christopher Moltisanti, and also wrote and produced five episodes, while Schirripa played Bobby Baccalieri in the series. The podcast is available on YouTube, Spotify, the Talking Sopranos website and on the HBO Max streaming service.

== Premise ==
On a typical installment of Talking Sopranos, Imperioli and Schirripa interview one or two of the Sopranos actors, writers, directors, producers, and others who were involved in the production of the series; the hosts then discuss and analyze a specific episode of the program, and answer a question sent in by a fan. Episodes 47, 62, and 68 feature interviews with celebrity "superfans" rather than Sopranos cast or crew.

Some episodes do not cover a specific episode of the series. Episode 39 is devoted entirely to interviewing series creator and showrunner David Chase. Episode 85 consists of interviews with four members of the cast and crew, and Rob Spragg of Alabama 3 (writer of "Woke Up This Morning" which plays over the opening credits). Episode 80 discusses Sopranos prequel film The Many Saints of Newark with David Chase and the cast from the film. Episodes 76 and 90 are devoted to interviewing "superfans" from across the globe.

== Production ==
Talking Sopranos is a Podjams production; the executive producer is Jeff Sussman and the producer is Andy Verderame.

The first episode of the podcast was released on April 6, 2020, in the early months of the COVID-19 pandemic in the United States, and so the hosts and guests initially filmed their parts remotely. As the series was recorded some 13–14 years after the March 2007 filming of the last Sopranos episode, several cast and crew members had died in the interim, including actors James Gandolfini (Tony Soprano), Frank Vincent (Phil Leotardo), and Denise Borino-Quinn (Ginny Sacrimoni), among others. Actress Nancy Marchand (Livia Soprano) and director John Patterson died during the production of the series. The final episode was broadcast on December 20, 2021.

Guests who appeared multiple times on the podcast are David Chase (episodes 39, 80 and 91), Steven Van Zandt (60, 79, and 89), Jamie-Lynn Sigler (8 and 81), John Ventimiglia (23 and 82), Vincent Pastore (26 and 83), Robert Iler (7 and 84), Terence Winter (18 and 86), Lorraine Bracco (19 and 87), and Aida Turturro (29 and 88).

On September 17, 2020, Imperioli and Schirripa signed a deal with HarperCollins book imprint William Morrow and Company to write an oral history of The Sopranos; the book, titled Woke Up This Morning: The Definitive Oral History of The Sopranos, was published on November 2, 2021.

== Reception ==
By September 2020, Talking Sopranos had reached over five million downloads, and as of January 2021, the podcast had 9 million listeners. It regularly appears on Apple's list of Top 10 TV/film podcasts.

In May 2021, the podcast won a Webby Award for Best Television & Film Podcast as the "People's Voice Winner".

A review of the podcast in The Guardian said, "It is catnip for Sopranos mega-fans: both actors were major characters and have an inexhaustible arsenal of anecdotes and trivia."

== Episode list ==
Episode	Broadcast date	Featured episode	Season and episode	Run time	Guest(s)
1	2020-04-06	"The Sopranos", aka "Pilot"	S1 E1	1:18:18	None
2	2020-04-08	"46 Long"	S1 E2	1:04:57	None
3	2020-04-13	"Denial, Anger, Acceptance"	S1 E3	1:02:51	None
4	2020-04-20	"Meadowlands"	S1 E4	1:30:44	Michael Rispoli (Jackie Aprile)
5	2020-04-27	"College"	S1 E5	1:11:38	None
6	2020-05-04	"Pax Soprana"	S1 E6	1:23:28	None
7	2020-05-11	"Down Neck"	S1 E7	1:46:58	Robert Iler (A.J. Soprano)
8	2020-05-18	"The Legend of Tennessee Moltisanti"	S1 E8	1:45:32	Jamie-Lynn Sigler (Meadow Soprano)
9	2020-05-25	"Boca"	S1 E9	1:32:40	None
10	2020-06-01	"A Hit Is a Hit"	S1 E10	1:59:33	Georgianne Walken and Sheila Jaffe (casting directors)
11	2020-06-08	"Nobody Knows Anything"	S1 E11	1:36:41	Henry Bronchtein (director)
12	2020-06-15	"Isabella"	S1 E12	1:29:56	None
13	2020-06-22	"I Dream of Jeannie Cusamano"	S1 E13	2:17:32	Edie Falco (Carmela Soprano)
14	2020-06-29	"Guy Walks into a Psychiatrist's Office..."	S2 E1	1:32:43	None
15	2020-07-06	"Do Not Resuscitate"	S2 E2	1:38:01	Juliet Polcsa (costume designer)
16	2020-07-13	"Toodle-Fucking-Oo"	S2 E3	1:19:37	None
17	2020-07-20	"Commendatori"	S2 E4	1:29:36	None
18	2020-07-27	"Big Girls Don't Cry"	S2 E5	2:04:02	Terence Winter (writer, director, producer)
19	2020-08-03	"The Happy Wanderer"	S2 E6	2:10:54	Lorraine Bracco (Dr. Jennifer Melfi)
20	2020-08-10	"D-Girl"	S2 E7	1:30:42	None
21	2020-08-17	"Full Leather Jacket"	S2 E8	2:06:19	Allen Coulter (director)
22	2020-08-24	"From Where to Eternity"	S2 E9	1:46:01	None
23	2020-08-31	"Bust Out"	S2 E10	2:34:53	John Ventimiglia (Artie Bucco)
24	2020-09-07	"House Arrest"	S2 E11	2:12:58	Louis Lombardi (Agent Skip Lipari)
25	2020-09-14	"The Knight in White Satin Armor"	S2 E12	2:18:55	David Proval (Richie Aprile)
26	2020-09-21	"Funhouse"	S2 E13	2:14:40	Vincent Pastore (Salvatore "Big Pussy" Bonpensiero)
27	2020-09-28	"Mr. Ruggerio's Neighborhood"	S3 E1	2:13:06	Kathrine Narducci (Charmaine Bucco)
28	2020-10-05	"Proshai, Livushka"	S3 E2	1:57:05	Jason Cerbone (Jackie Aprile Jr.)
29	2020-10-12	"Fortunate Son"	S3 E3	2:17:02	Aida Turturro (Janice Soprano)
30	2020-10-19	"Employee of the Month"	S3 E4	2:15:36	Robin Green and Mitchell Burgess (writers)
31	2020-10-26	"Another Toothpick"	S3 E5	2:13:29	None
32	2020-11-02	"University"	S3 E6	1:32:06	Ariel Kiley (Tracee)
33	2020-11-09	"Second Opinion"	S3 E7	2:25:21	Phil Abraham (cinematographer, director)
34	2020-11-16	"He Is Risen"	S3 E8	2:06:23	Martin Bruestle (producer)
35	2020-11-23	"The Telltale Moozadell"	S3 E9	2:05:54	None
36	2020-11-30	"...To Save Us All from Satan's Power"	S3 E10	2:12:26	Max Casella (Benny Fazio)
37	2020-12-07	"Pine Barrens"	S3 E11	2:55:08	Steve Buscemi (Tony Blundetto, director)
38	2020-12-14	"Amour Fou"	S3 E12	2:27:29	Annabella Sciorra (Gloria Trillo)
39	2020-12-21	"90 Minutes w/ David Chase"	—	1:51:10	David Chase (series creator, writer, director, producer)
40	2020-12-28	"Army of One"	S3 E13	2:15:35	None
41	2021-01-04	"For All Debts Public and Private"	S4 E1	2:43:04	Federico Castelluccio (Furio Giunta)
42	2021-01-11	"No Show"	S4 E2	2:23:49	Jerry Adler (Hesh Rabkin) • Mathew Price (production sound mixer)
43	2021-01-18	"Christopher"	S4 E3	2:40:03	Ray Abruzzo (Little Carmine)
44	2021-01-25	"The Weight"	S4 E4	2:13:22	Dominic Chianese (Junior Soprano)
45	2021-02-01	"Pie-O-My"	S4 E5	2:51:43	Lola Glaudini (Agent Ciccerone) • Matt Servitto (Agent Harris)
46	2021-02-08	"Everybody Hurts"	S4 E6	2:21:34	Jack Bender (director)
47	2021-02-15	"Watching Too Much Television"	S4 E7	2:10:55	Pete Davidson (celebrity "superfan")
48	2021-02-22	"Mergers and Acquisitions"	S4 E8	2:17:28	Angelo Massagli (Bobby Baccalieri III) • Arthur Nascarella (Carlo Gervasi)
49	2021-03-01	"Whoever Did This"	S4 E9	2:36:24	Al Sapienza (Mikey Palmice) • Dan Grimaldi (Philly and Patsy Parisi)
50	2021-03-08	"The Strong, Silent Type"	S4 E10	2:33:46	Alla Kliouka (Svetlana Kirilenko) • Robert Funaro (Eugene Pontecorvo)
51	2021-03-15	"Calling All Cars"	S4 E11	2:42:00	Peter Riegert (Assemblyman Zellman)
52	2021-03-22	"Eloise"	S4 E12	2:07:21	None
53	2021-03-29	"Whitecaps"	S4 E13	2:25:25	Frankie Valli (Rusty Millio)
54	2021-04-05	"Two Tonys"	S5 E1	2:31:15	Will Janowitz (Finn DeTrolio)
55	2021-04-12	"Rat Pack"	S5 E2	2:46:27	Oksana Lada (Irina Peltsin) • Carl Capotorto (Little Paulie)
56	2021-04-19	"Where's Johnny?"	S5 E3	2:42:01	Matthew Del Negro (Brian Cammarata) • Chris Caldovino (Billy Leotardo)
57	2021-04-26	"All Happy Families..."	S5 E4	2:35:00	Todd A. Kessler (writer, producer)
58	2021-05-03	"Irregular Around the Margins"	S5 E5	2:24:23	Maureen Van Zandt (Gabriella Dante)
59	2021-05-10	"Sentimental Education"	S5 E6	2:35:36	Paul Schulze (Father Phil) • Jason Minter (locations manager)
60	2021-05-17	"In Camelot"	S5 E7	2:52:32	Steven Van Zandt (Silvio Dante)
61	2021-05-24	"Marco Polo"	S5 E8	2:24:58	Leslie Rae Bega (Valentina La Paz) • Joe Lisi (Dick Barone)
62	2021-05-31	"Unidentified Black Males"	S5 E9	2:49:32	Alec Baldwin (celebrity "superfan")
63	2021-06-07	"Cold Cuts"	S5 E10	2:37:45	Richard Portnow (Harold Melvoin) • Suzanne Shepherd (Mary DeAngelis)
64	2021-06-14	"The Test Dream"	S5 E11	2:34:24	Matthew Weiner (writer, producer)
65	2021-06-21	"Long Term Parking"	S5 E12	2:54:37	Peter Bogdanovich (Dr. Elliot Kupferberg, director) • Marianne Leone (Joanne Moltisanti)
66	2021-06-28	"All Due Respect"	S5 E13	2:24:57	Toni Kalem (Angie Bonpensiero, writer)
67	2021-07-05	"Members Only"	S6 E1	2:46:25	Dania Ramirez (Blanca Selgado)
68	2021-07-12	"Join the Club"	S6 E2	2:28:37	Ricky Gervais (celebrity "superfan")
69	2021-07-19	"Mayham"	S6 E3	3:04:06	Vanessa Ferlito (Tina Francesco) • Bob Shaw (production designer)
70	2021-07-26	"The Fleshy Part of the Thigh"	S6 E4	2:48:48	Louis Mustillo (Sal Vitro)
71	2021-08-02	"Mr. & Mrs. John Sacrimoni Request..."	S6 E5	3:18:29	William DeMeo (Jason Molinaro) • Joe Maruzzo (Joe Peeps)
72	2021-08-09	"Live Free or Die"	S6 E6	2:54:38	Saundra Santiago (Jeannie and Joan Cusamano) • Robert LuPone (Dr. Bruce Cusamano)
73	2021-08-16	"Luxury Lounge"	S6 E7	2:51:16	Robert Patrick (David Scatino)
74	2021-08-23	"Johnny Cakes"	S6 E8	2:51:05	Julianna Margulies (Julianna Skiff)
75	2021-08-30	"The Ride"	S6 E9	2:12:10	Tim Daly (J.T. Dolan)
76	2021-09-06	"Superfan Episode"	—	2:13:32	Eight "superfans"
77	2021-09-13	"Moe n' Joe"	S6 E10	3:09:19	Emily Wickersham (Rhiannon Flammer) • Pete Bucossi (stunt coordinator)
78	2021-09-20	"Cold Stones"	S6 E11	2:35:18	Cara Buono (Kelli Moltisanti) • Alan Taylor (director)
79	2021-09-27	"Kaisha"	S6 E12	2:56:52	Steven Van Zandt (Silvio Dante)
80	2021-10-04	"The Many Saints of Newark Special"	—	2:41:47	David Chase (series creator, writer, director, producer) • Alessandro Nivola (Dickie Moltisanti) • Michael Gandolfini (Tony Soprano) • Corey Stoll (Junior Soprano) • John Magaro (Silvio Dante) • Leslie Odom Jr. (Harold McBrayer)
81	2021-10-11	"Soprano Home Movies"	S6 E13	2:21:42	Jamie-Lynn Sigler (Meadow Soprano)
82	2021-10-18	"Stage 5"	S6 E14	2:26:32	John Ventimiglia (Artie Bucco)
83	2021-10-25	"Remember When"	S6 E15	2:59:06	Vincent Pastore (Salvatore "Big Pussy" Bonpensiero)
84	2021-11-01	"Chasing It"	S6 E16	2:27:22	Robert Iler (A.J. Soprano)
85	2021-11-08	"Special Episode"	—	2:43:23	Frank Renzulli (writer, producer) • Rob Spragg (co-writer of "Woke Up This Morning") • Henry Yuk (Sungyon Kim) • Ilene Landress (producer, production manager) • Dan Attias (director)
86	2021-11-15	"Walk Like A Man"	S6 E17	2:35:54	Terence Winter (writer, director, producer)
87	2021-11-22	"Kennedy and Heidi"	S6 E18	2:23:05	Lorraine Bracco (Dr. Jennifer Melfi)
88	2021-11-29	"The Second Coming"	S6 E19	2:20:27	Aida Turturro (Janice Soprano)
89	2021-12-06	"The Blue Comet"	S6 E20	1:54:27	Steven Van Zandt (Silvio Dante) • Andy Verderame (producer of Talking Sopranos)
90	2021-12-13	"Superfan Episode #2"	—	2:01:10	Seven "superfans"
91	2021-12-20	"Made in America"	S6 E21	2:23:07	David Chase (series creator, writer, director, producer)
92	2025-06-18	"Catching Up"	—	1:06:52	None
