= The Sopranos season 2 =

Television show season

The Sopranos
- Season 2
- Region 1 DVD cover art
- Starring: James Gandolfini; Lorraine Bracco; Edie Falco; Michael Imperioli; Dominic Chianese; Vincent Pastore; Steven Van Zandt; Tony Sirico; Robert Iler; Jamie-Lynn Sigler; Drea de Matteo; Aida Turturro; Nancy Marchand; David Proval
- No. of episodes: 13

Release
- Original network: HBO
- Original release: January 16 – April 9, 2000

Season chronology
- ← Previous; Season 1 Next → Season 3

The second season of the American crime drama series The Sopranos aired on HBO from January 16 to April 9, 2000. The second season was released on VHS and DVD in region 1 on November 6, 2001.

The story of the season focuses on Tony's growing mistrust of one of his closest friends Big Pussy Bonpensiero, who is revealed to be an FBI informant. Dr. Melfi continues meeting with Tony despite her growing disgust with his actions and contemplates the nature of their relationship. Tony's sister Janice also returns to New Jersey, and their collectively strained relationship with their mother Livia and each other continues.

Meadow is accepted into college, but her personal life intersects with Tony's criminal life for the first time. Uncle Junior gets sent to prison again for his crimes. Tony introduces his new enforcer straight from Italy, Furio. Former boss Jackie Aprile's brother Richie is released from prison and causes trouble for Tony and his business.

== Cast ==
=== Main cast ===
- James Gandolfini as Tony Soprano, the De facto boss of the DiMeo crime family who struggles with keeping his men and family in line.
- Lorraine Bracco as Dr. Jennifer Melfi, Tony's former therapist, who is unsure if she wants to take him back.
- Edie Falco as Carmela Soprano, Tony's wife, who begins questioning their relationship.
- Michael Imperioli as Christopher Moltisanti, Tony's cousin by marriage, who is interested in screenwriting.
- Dominic Chianese as Corrado "Junior" Soprano, Jr., Tony's uncle and the boss in name of the family, struggling under house arrest.
- Vincent Pastore as Sal "Big Pussy" Bonpensiero, Tony's best friend and a DiMeo soldier who struggles with his loyalty.
- Steven Van Zandt as Silvio Dante, the family's loyal consigliere.
- Tony Sirico as Paul "Paulie Walnuts" Gualtieri, a short-tempered capo.
- Robert Iler as Anthony Soprano, Jr., Tony's son.
- Jamie-Lynn Sigler as Meadow Soprano, Tony's daughter, who is looking into colleges.
- Drea de Matteo as Adriana La Cerva, Chris's girlfriend.
- David Proval as Richie Aprile, the late Jackie Aprile's older brother, who quickly falls back into his old ways after being released from prison.
- Aida Turturro as Janice Soprano, Tony's dramatic sister, who comes to town to live with their mother.
- Nancy Marchand as Livia Soprano, Tony's petulant mother, who he is no longer on speaking terms with.

=== Recurring cast ===
- Louis Lombardi as Skip Lipari, an FBI agent tasked with handling a member of the DiMeo family.
- Federico Castelluccio as Furio Giunta, a violent Neapolitan Camorra turned DiMeo family soldier.
- Lillo Brancato, Jr. as Matthew Bevilaqua, Chris's dim-witted subordinate looking to get recognition.
- Steven R. Schirripa as Bobby Baccalieri, Junior's kind-hearted aide.
- Jerry Adler as Herman "Hesh" Rabkin, Tony's Jewish associate.
- Chris Tardio as Sean Gismonte, Matthew's equally dim-witted friend.
- John Fiore as Gianluigi "Gigi" Cestone, a former soldier in Junior's crew, who defected to Tony's crew.
- Peter Bogdanovich as Dr. Elliot Kupferberg, Melfi's therapist, who tries to get her to analyze her relationship with Tony.
- John Ventimiglia as Artie Bucco, Tony's non-mob friend who runs a restaurant.
- Toni Kalem as Angie Bonpensiero, Pussy's wife, with whom his relationship is strained.
- Vincent Curatola as Johnny Sack, the underboss of the Lupertazzi family.
- Oksana Lada as Irina Peltsin, Tony's Russian comare, whose relationship with him is fraying.
- Tom Aldredge as Hugo "Hugh" DeAngelis, Carmela's father.
- Suzanne Shepherd as Mary Pellegrino DeAngelis, Carmela's mother.
- Robert Patrick as David Scatino, Tony's non-mob friend, who has a gambling problem.
- Sharon Angela as Rosalie Aprile, Carmela's best friend.
- Nicole Burdette as Barbara Soprano Giglione, Tony's estranged sister.
- Joseph R. Gannascoli as Vito Spatafore, a soldier in Richie's crew.
- Dan Grimaldi as Phillip "Philly Spoons" Parisi, a capo who causes trouble for Tony.
- Sofia Milos as Annalisa Zucca, the acting boss of a Naples-based crime family.
- Frank Pellegrino as Frank Cubitoso, the FBI agent in charge of the investigation into the DiMeo family.

== Episodes ==
Season 2 episodes
No. overall	No. in season	Title	Directed by	Written by	Original release date	U.S. viewers (millions)
14	1	"Guy Walks into a Psychiatrist's Office..."	Allen Coulter	Jason Cahill	January 16, 2000	7.64
Four months after the events of the first season, Pussy returns, claiming he was getting his back treated, although Tony remains suspicious. He has Junior's successor Philly Parisi killed for talking about Tony trying to kill Livia. (Note: As depicted in "I Dream of Jeannie Cusamano".) Janice comes to town to take care of Livia, but Tony gets angry when he realizes she may be trying to profit off of his selling their mother's house. He calls Melfi to tell her she can come out of hiding, and tries to continue seeing her when he has a panic attack while driving. Enraged that his putting her in danger led to one of her patients committing suicide, she rejects him.
15	2	"Do Not Resuscitate"	Martin Bruestle	Robin Green & Mitchell Burgess and Frank Renzulli	January 23, 2000	5.33
Junior is released from prison and placed on house arrest. He informs Tony that the director of Livia's nursing home is the one who is spreading the rumors about his attempt to kill her, so Tony has the man killed. Tony deals with black workers demanding jobs at his construction sites by colluding with the protestors' leader behind their backs. Janice decides to move in with Livia when she is released from the hospital. Tony and Janice sign a DNR for Livia, which A.J. reveals to her without knowing what it is. Junior slips in the shower and is taken to the hospital by Tony, and he urges him to make peace with his mother.
16	3	"Toodle-Fucking-Oo"	Lee Tamahori	Frank Renzulli	January 30, 2000	5.60
Meadow uses Livia's house for a party, but manipulates her parents into giving her a mild punishment. Janice initially takes her side, but changes her tune when she sees the state of the house, causing an argument between her and Carmela about the latter's parenting. Melfi has an awkward encounter with Tony at a restaurant, confiding in her own psychiatrist, Elliot Kupferberg, that she feels guilt over no longer wanting to treat him. She later has a nightmare about him passing out while driving and dying in a car crash. Jackie Aprile's older brother Richie is released from prison after ten years, claiming to have reformed but crippling a debtor that is under Tony's protection. As Tony goes to Livia's to get the locks changed, he is perplexed to find a guilty Meadow cleaning the floor inside.
17	4	"Commendatori"	Tim Van Patten	David Chase	February 6, 2000	7.16
Tony, Paulie and Chris go to Naples to negotiate the price of stolen cars with a crime family. Tony learns that the daughter of the family’s boss is running things. She tries to seduce him but he turns her down due to their business relationship, and he decreases the price on the cars in exchange for taking her best man, Furio Giunta. Paulie, excited to go to Italy for the first time, is frustrated to find that he does not fit in. Chris, determined to see Mount Vesuvius, instead spends the trip in his room, high on heroin. Pussy is seen by an associate meeting with his FBI handler, so he tracks down the man and kills him. His wife Angie expresses her desire for a divorce to Carmela, but she guilts her into staying with him. Tony returns home and announces himself, and Carmela hesitates before going to him.
18	5	"Big Girls Don't Cry"	Tim Van Patten	Terence Winter	February 13, 2000	5.34
Furio is brought to America, prompting Tony to promote Paulie and their friend Silvio Dante, but not Pussy, angering him. Tony discovers that Janice and Richie have restarted their old relationship. While he learns from Hesh Rabkin that Johnny Soprano also had panic attacks, Kupferberg tries to get Melfi to see that she experiences a thrill from treating Tony, but she takes him back anyway. Adriana enrolls Chris in an acting class as a birthday present. He struggles until he performs the final scene of Rebel Without a Cause, wowing the class but causing him to storm out. In the next class, Chris beats up the actor who played his father. When Adriana suggests he hit him because he reminded him of his real father, Chris throws out all his writing.
19	6	"The Happy Wanderer"	John Patterson	Frank Renzulli	February 20, 2000	5.83
Tony admits to Melfi that he feels an innate anger towards absentmindedly happy people he sees on the street. He takes over Junior's gambling game and is accosted by his non-mob friend, David Scatino, asking to play. Knowing that Scatino is a compulsive gambler, Tony tries to stop him but eventually relents, resulting in Scatino being in debt. As Scatino continues to stall, Tony beats him, forcing him to sell his son Eric's car to him as partial payment. Tony tries to give it to Meadow, but she recognizes it as Eric's and rejects it. At her cabaret night, Eric refuses to perform with her, giving her the solo she had wanted earlier. Carmela notes Meadow's luck and wonders what happened as Scatino and his wife leave the theater, and Tony shrugs.
20	7	"D-Girl"	Allen Coulter	Todd A. Kessler	February 27, 2000	6.66
Chris meets and begins sleeping with his cousin's fiancée Amy Safir, who works for Jon Favreau. Adriana, having saved a copy of Chris's screenplay, encourages him to show it to Favreau, who quickly takes a liking to Chris. Chris begins to ignore his duties towards Tony and spends more time with Favreau and Amy. Chris discovers that Favreau has written a confidential mob anecdote into his newest script, enraging him. Favreau returns to Hollywood and Amy does not answer Chris's calls, so he confronts her in person and she claims that there is no longer an interest in mob films. A.J. begins to question the existence of God right before his confirmation, fueled when he has an existential talk with Livia. Pussy's handler orders him to wear a wire at the confirmation. Tony catches A.J. smoking marijuana after the ceremony, and Pussy encourages him to enjoy his life with his father, later becoming overcome with grief at wearing the wire. Tony learns of Chris's activities and orders him to choose between him and his writing, which Chris considers before choosing Tony.
21	8	"Full Leather Jacket"	Allen Coulter	Robin Green & Mitchell Burgess	March 5, 2000	6.29
Carmela asks Jeannie Cusamano (Note: The Sopranos' next door neighbor, first seen in "A Hit Is a Hit".) to get her Georgetown University alumna sister to write a letter of recommendation for Meadow. When the woman refuses, Carmela talks to her directly, her status as Tony's wife intimidating her into writing it. After a fight with Chris, Adriana leaves him, but he goes to her and proposes engagement, which she accepts. Richie gives Tony a leather jacket that belonged to a feared mobster as a sign of respect, but Tony is not impressed. Later, Richie sees the Sopranos' housekeeper's husband wearing it. Chris's underlings, Matt Bevilaqua and Sean Gismonte, continue to be shorted by Chris and Tony. They take action after Chris does not show up to a meeting, attacking and shooting him. Sean is killed during the ambush, while Matt tries to seek shelter with Richie, who throws him out after he learns what he has done. The attack leaves Chris badly wounded, and he is hospitalized.
22	9	"From Where to Eternity"	Henry J. Bronchtein	Michael Imperioli	March 12, 2000	7.18
Chris briefly dies on the operating table, but survives despite losing his spleen. When he wakes, he claims he saw Hell and that Satan told him he is destined for it, delivering a message to Tony and Paulie. While Tony dismisses this, Paulie is deeply frightened by it, going to a psychic who claims the spirits of those he killed are watching him. He complains to his priest that the donations he has made to the church should protect him, and declares he will no longer give money if they cannot preserve his soul. Pussy and Tony track Matt down and kill him. Carmela asks Tony to get a vasectomy to prevent any children out of marriage, but he refuses. He eventually gives in, only for Carmela to reveal she has changed her mind, asking him to no longer practice infidelity and promising "all I want is you" before having sex with him.
23	10	"Bust Out"	John Patterson	Frank Renzulli and Robin Green & Mitchell Burgess	March 19, 2000	7.62
A witness to Matt's murder identifies Tony to the police, but withdraws his statement when he learns who he is. Tony's crew runs a fraud on Scatino's store, and they use him to get scalped airline tickets. Angry with his reduced cut of the store, Richie suggests to Junior that Tony should be killed, reminding him that he tried to do the same thing (Note: As depicted in "Isabella".) when Junior admonishes him. Carmela meets Scatino's widowed brother-in-law Victor Musto, and the two develop an attraction to each other and kiss. He promises to come over the next day, but does not show up when he learns who Scatino is in debt to. Feeling slighted when A.J. hangs out with his friends instead of him, Tony misses his swim meet. Pushed by Carmela to make it up to him, Tony takes A.J. out on their boat and lets him steer, their trajectory making a smaller boat capsize.
24	11	"House Arrest"	Tim Van Patten	Terence Winter	March 26, 2000	5.51
When Junior and Richie sell cocaine on Tony's legitimate garbage routes, Tony argues with Richie and has a panic attack, almost having another when Janice and Richie announce their engagement. Tony's lawyer advises him to keep his nose clean following Matt's murder, but he finds himself bored at his no-show job. Junior is released from the hospital but placed back on house arrest, and he gets his hand stuck down the kitchen disposal for hours. Melfi begins drinking more before her sessions with Tony, but continues to treat him despite Kupferberg's warnings to stop. She suggests to Tony that he may have an antisocial personality and uses his criminal activities to distract himself from his immorality, but he shrugs her off. He returns to Satriale's, the deli he and his friends use as a front, and is welcomed back by them and a recently discharged Chris. A car crash happens out front and the men observe it before going about their day.
25	12	"The Knight in White Satin Armor"	Allen Coulter	Robin Green & Mitchell Burgess	April 2, 2000	5.44
After another argument about the garbage routes, Richie goes to a capo to get approval for a hit on Tony. Junior, correctly suspecting Richie will not be able to turn him, instead rats him out. Tony confides in Silvio who suggests that there is nothing to be gained by keeping Richie alive. Separately, Richie and Janice have an argument, and Richie punches her in the face. In retaliation, she shoots him. Tony and his men clean up the body and arrange for Janice to leave New Jersey. Tony speaks to Livia for the first time since he tried to kill her, during which they argue about her parenting and she cries. Her crying turns to quiet laughter when he trips while leaving the house. Pussy turns against Tony and tries to get in good with the FBI by busting Chris, but winds up in a car crash. Tony's comare Irina Peltsin attempts suicide after he leaves her, and Tony has Silvio pay her to leave him alone. Upset by this, Carmela visits Musto, but realizes he was a no-show for their lunch because of Tony. Tony returns home and Carmela announces her plans to go to Rome for three weeks with Rosalie. When Tony demands she not go, she states she may kill herself if he does not let her.
26	13	"Funhouse"	John Patterson	David Chase and Todd A. Kessler	April 9, 2000	8.97
Fed up with Livia's stressing over her living situation, Tony gives her Scatino's airline tickets. He contracts food poisoning, having a series of intense fever dreams. In a delirious dream, Pussy, in the form of a fish, tells Tony that he is an informant because he was passed over for promotion. Tony wakes and goes to Pussy's house, pretending to be sick so he can search Pussy's room and find his wire. He takes Pussy, Silvio and Paulie out on a boat, where they kill Pussy and dump his body in the Atlantic Ocean. Livia is detained after trying to use the tickets, and the FBI arrests Tony. After his release, Melfi tries to get him to talk about Livia's attempt on his life and if it corresponds to him giving her the tickets, but he leaves. At Meadow's high school graduation, Tony ejects Junior when he spots him talking to Meadow and speaks to a recently divorced Scatino, who reveals that he is moving out west and that Eric got accepted into his top college but cannot afford to go. As a montage of Tony's various illegal endeavors is shown, Tony smokes a cigar by himself at Meadow's party before the shot fades to the Atlantic.

== Reception ==
=== Critical response ===
The second season of The Sopranos received universal acclaim from critics—garnering a 97 out of 100 on Metacritic, and a 94% approval rating on Rotten Tomatoes with an average score of 9.5/10. The latter aggregator reports a critical consensus of "The Sopranos' strong cast and solid writing add depth to the show's occasionally unlikable characters and their repellent deeds, making for thought-provoking, consistently compelling viewing." Ed Bark of Dallas Morning News wrote, "[It] could be the best TV series of our times. Not for everyone, no. But for what it is, The Sopranos is near magical."

Steve Johnson of the Chicago Tribune praised the series for accurately portraying human communication, observing how the show reveals "matters of the greatest consequence stem from misunderstandings and misinterpretations." Eric Mink of The New York Times wrote of the show's unique writing and multifaceted characters: "The Sopranos remains a showcase for ferociously distinctive writing, inventive direction and brilliant portrayals of surprisingly, even disturbingly, sympathetic multilayered characters by a perfectly cast group of actors who hold back nothing."

=== Awards and nominations ===
Year	Association	Category	Nominee(s)	Result	Ref.
2000	Primetime Emmy Awards	Outstanding Drama Series		Nominated	
2000	Primetime Emmy Awards	Outstanding Lead Actor in a Drama Series	James Gandolfini (episode: "The Happy Wanderer")	Won	
2000	Primetime Emmy Awards	Outstanding Lead Actress in a Drama Series	Lorraine Bracco (episode: "Big Girls Don't Cry")	Nominated	
2000	Primetime Emmy Awards	Outstanding Lead Actress in a Drama Series	Edie Falco (episode: "Full Leather Jacket")	Nominated	
2000	Primetime Emmy Awards	Outstanding Supporting Actor in a Drama Series	Dominic Chianese	Nominated	
2000	Primetime Emmy Awards	Outstanding Supporting Actress in a Drama Series	Nancy Marchand (episodes: "Do Not Resuscitate" + "Funhouse")	Nominated	
2000	Primetime Emmy Awards	Outstanding Directing for a Drama Series	Allen Coulter (episode: "The Knight in White Satin Armor")	Nominated	
2000	Primetime Emmy Awards	Outstanding Directing for a Drama Series	John Patterson (episode: "Funhouse")	Nominated	
2000	Primetime Emmy Awards	Outstanding Writing for a Drama Series	David Chase, Todd A. Kessler (episode: "Funhouse")	Nominated	
2000	Primetime Emmy Awards	Outstanding Writing for a Drama Series	Robin Green, Mitchell Burgess (episode: "The Knight in White Satin Armor")	Nominated	
2000	Golden Globe Awards	Best Drama Series		Nominated	
2000	Golden Globe Awards	Best Actor in a Drama Series	James Gandolfini	Nominated	
2000	Golden Globe Awards	Best Actress in a Drama Series	Lorraine Bracco	Nominated	
2000	Golden Globe Awards	Best Actress in a Drama Series	Edie Falco	Nominated	
2000	Screen Actors Guild Awards	Outstanding Ensemble in a Drama Series	Entire Cast	Nominated	
2000	Screen Actors Guild Awards	Outstanding Actor in a Drama Series	James Gandolfini	Nominated	
2000	Screen Actors Guild Awards	Outstanding Actor in a Drama Series	Edie Falco	Nominated	
2000	Directors Guild of America Awards	Outstanding Directing for a Drama Series	Henry J. Bronchtein (episode: "From Where to Eternity")	Nominated	
2000	Directors Guild of America Awards	Outstanding Directing for a Drama Series	Allen Coulter (episode: "The Knight in White Satin Armor")	Nominated	
2000	Directors Guild of America Awards	Outstanding Directing for a Drama Series	John Patterson (episode: "Funhouse")	Nominated	
2000	Writers Guild of America Awards	Best Drama Episode	Mitchell Burgess, Robin Green (episode: "The Knight in White Satin Armor")	Nominated	
2000	Writers Guild of America Awards	Best Drama Episode	Terence Winter (episode: "Big Girls Don't Cry")	Nominated	
2000	TCA Awards	Program of the Year		Nominated	
2000	TCA Awards	Outstanding Achievement in Drama		Nominated	
2000	TCA Awards	Outstanding Individual Achievement in Drama	James Gandolfini	Won	
2000	Satellite Awards	Best Drama Series		Nominated	
2000	Satellite Awards	Best Actor in a Drama Series	James Gandolfini	Nominated	
2000	Satellite Awards	Best Actress in a Drama Series	Edie Falco	Nominated	
