= House Arrest (The Sopranos) =

- The Sopranos episode
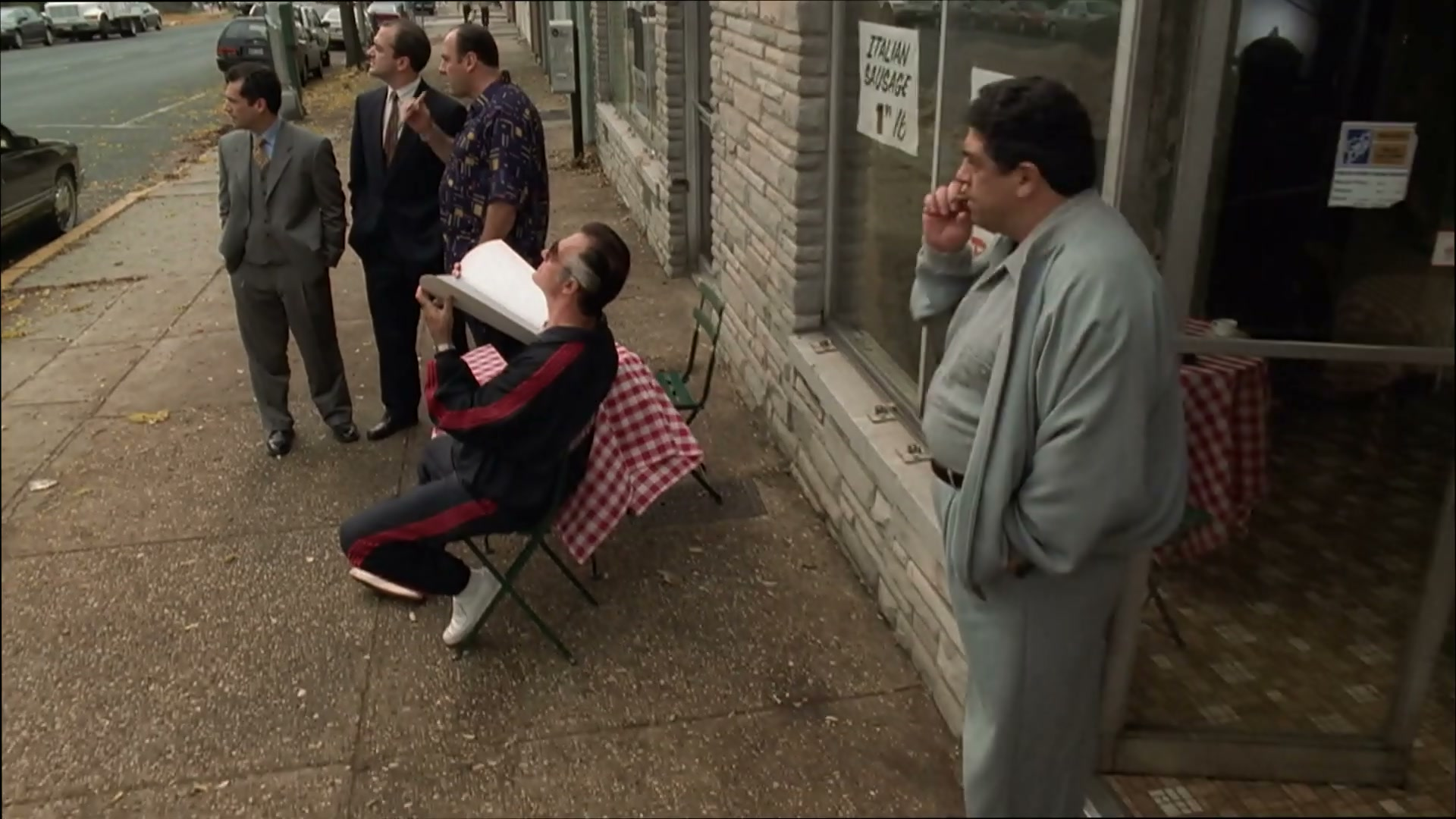
- The crew in front of Satriale's
- Episode no.: Season 2 Episode 11
- Directed by: Tim Van Patten
- Written by: Terence Winter
- Cinematography by: Phil Abraham
- Production code: 211
- Original air date: March 26, 2000
- Running time: 57 minutes

Episode chronology
| ← Previous "Bust Out" | Next → "The Knight in White Satin Armor" |
- The Sopranos season 2

"House Arrest" is the 24th episode of the HBO original series The Sopranos and the 11th of the show's second season. It was written by Terence Winter and directed by Tim Van Patten, and originally aired on March 26, 2000.

== Starring ==
- James Gandolfini as Tony Soprano
- Lorraine Bracco as Dr. Jennifer Melfi
- Edie Falco as Carmela Soprano
- Michael Imperioli as Christopher Moltisanti
- Dominic Chianese as Corrado Soprano, Jr.
- Vincent Pastore as Pussy Bonpensiero
- Steven Van Zandt as Silvio Dante
- Tony Sirico as Paulie Gualtieri
- Robert Iler as Anthony Soprano, Jr.*
- Jamie-Lynn Sigler as Meadow Soprano*
- Drea de Matteo as Adriana La Cerva *
- David Proval as Richie Aprile
- Aida Turturro as Janice Soprano
- Nancy Marchand as Livia Soprano

* = credited only

=== Guest starring ===
- Jerry Adler as Hesh Rabkin

==== Also guest starring ====
- Mary Louise Wilson as Catherine Romano
- Peter Bogdanovich as Dr. Elliot Kupferberg
- Matthew Sussman as Dr. Schreck
- Federico Castelluccio as Furio Giunta
- Steven R. Schirripa as "Bobby Bacala" Baccalieri
- David Margulies as Neil Mink
- Sharon Angela as Rosalie Aprile
- Toni Kalem as Angie Bonpensiero
- Will McCormack as Jason La Penna
- Maureen Van Zandt as Gabriella Dante
- Joe Lisi as Dick Barone
- Vito Antuofermo as Bobby Zanone
- Sabine Singh as Tracy
- Jennifer Albano as Connie DeSapio
- Matt Servitto as Agent Harris
- Gary Perez as Agent Marquez
- Roy Thinnes as Dr. Baumgartner
- Terry Winter as Tom Amberson

== Synopsis ==
Tony is advised by his lawyer, Neil Mink, to "insulate" himself from the "shenanigans." He spends time at home, where he is bored, and then in the office of Barone Sanitation, where he is still bored, though he draws up an office basketball pool and has vigorous sex with the office assistant.

Dr. Melfi is under heavy stress because of her relationship with Tony. She is drinking between sessions on the days that she sees him. Tony comments once, "You seem very mellow today. You look like you're on drugs." In a restaurant with her son, she creates a scene when she tries to stop another patron from smoking. She tells Dr. Kupferberg that, although she is repulsed by what Tony tells her, "I can't stop myself from wanting to hear it." Kupferberg prescribes medication and urges her again to cease treating Tony.

Uncle Junior and Richie are selling cocaine on their garbage routes. Tony angrily tells Richie to stop, saying that this can draw FBI and DEA attention to their legitimate business. Richie glares at him before turning away. After this confrontation, Tony has a panic attack. He almost has another when he sees Janice behaving lovingly with Richie, who is now her fiancé. Thinking aloud, Tony says, "Oh, you poor bastard."

One of Junior's drivers continues selling cocaine; Junior says he needs the income for legal and medical expenses. At the hospital, he is recognized by Catherine Romano, who was a classmate of his younger brother Johnny. She is now the widow – and the mother – of a police detective. At first, Junior evades her, embarrassed by his illnesses and house arrest. Eventually, he phones her, and in his home she affectionately looks after him.

Tony returns to Satriale's, where his crew – including a now-discharged and nearly fully-recovered Christopher – welcomes him back.

== Title reference ==
House arrest is a sentence issued by a judge as an alternative to prison time and helps keep track of convicted criminals after or as an alternative to, a prison sentence. The sentence states that the person cannot leave their main domicile and can only be released for important family functions, medical appointments, or funerals. Junior is also able to leave his residence when he needs to visit a supermarket. Junior's social life begins to dwindle under his sentence.

The title also applies to the increased amount of time that Tony spends at home, surrounded by mundane activities that do not interest him. In this way, Tony experiences a sort of "house arrest", isolated from his friends and the work that he enjoys. Although Tony's sentence is more self-imposed than his uncle's, it has been advised by his lawyer.

== Cultural references ==
- When Tony is reminded of the Bevilaqua murder case by his lawyer, he remarks "I told you, I was home alone". Mink replies "You and Macaulay Culkin", referring to the 1990 film Home Alone.
- One of the nurses in the hospital laughs at the U.S. Marshal sent to affix an electronic bracelet to Junior's ankle when he mentions his last name is McLuhan. His professional name is therefore Marshal McLuhan, similar to the name of Canadian philosopher Marshall McLuhan. In his 1970 book From Cliche to Archetype, McLuhan extensively analyzed and discussed Eugène Ionesco play The Bald Soprano.
- Mary Louise Wilson's character Catherine Romano shares a name with Nanette Fabray's character on the sitcom One Day at a Time, which Wilson was also on from 1976–1977.
- During a therapy session, Tony mentions he was watching a movie starring Brad Pitt and Gwyneth Paltrow. Dr. Melfi guesses Sliding Doors (which stars Paltrow but not Pitt). Tony corrects her with Seven.
- Tony asks if Dr. Melfi is in mourning after "the coming of managed care," which was a group of activities introduced in the early 1980s intended to reduce the cost of American health care.
- While Junior is talking to Catherine, she mentions her husband died "almost 15 years ago, the week the shuttle exploded", referring to the Challenger disaster of January 1986 (at this point, the Columbia disaster had not yet taken place).
- Junior jokes that Judge Crater is at the door, but Bobby doesn't get the reference.
- Tony calls Richie's eyes "Manson lamps," a reference to Charles Manson's wide-eyed appearance.
- At a meeting of Carmela's book club in her living room, her friends discuss the memoir Angela's Ashes by Frank McCourt. McCourt's follow-up memoir, 'Tis, lies on a nearby table.
- Tony sarcastically rebuts Junior's nostalgic view of 1950s gangsters working together to settle their differences amicably, mentioning his memories of the picture of Albert Anastasia "lying there all amicable, on the barber shop floor". He's referring to the 1957 assassination of the Mafia boss in the barbershop of Manhattan's Park Sheraton Hotel.
- During a therapy session with Dr. Melfi, Tony, frustrated with his recent lack of progress, angrily mentions he's "ready for the George Sanders long walk", which refers to the 1972 suicide of actor George Sanders.
- The television show Junior Soprano and Catherine Romano are watching when he falls asleep is Diagnosis: Murder, starring Dick Van Dyke.

== Music ==
- The song at the beginning of the episode when the garbage truck dumps the pile of trash outside the deli is "Space Invader" by The Pretenders.
- The song that plays early in the episode at the Soprano house over the radio station Q104.3 is "Gotta Serve Somebody" by Bob Dylan.
- Prior to Tony's panic attack at the banquet, the song playing is "Disco Inferno", by The Trammps.
- The song that plays while Tony suffers his panic attack at the banquet is "More Than a Feeling" by Boston. The lyric "I closed my eyes and I slipped away" can be heard just before he passes out.
- The song played over the end credits is "You Can't Put Your Arms Around a Memory" by Johnny Thunders.

== Filming locations ==
Listed in order of first appearance:

- Little Falls, New Jersey
- Passaic River and Newark skyline from Harrison, New Jersey
- Jersey City, New Jersey
- Livingston, New Jersey
- Los Angeles, California
- Satriale's Pork Store in Kearny, New Jersey
