= Meadowlands (The Sopranos) =

- The Sopranos episode
- Episode no.: Season 1 Episode 4
- Directed by: John Patterson
- Written by: Jason Cahill
- Cinematography by: Alik Sakharov
- Production code: 104
- Original air date: January 31, 1999
- Running time: 53 minutes

Episode chronology
← Previous "Denial, Anger, Acceptance"	Next → "College"
- The Sopranos season 1

"Meadowlands" is the fourth episode of the HBO original series The Sopranos. It was written by Jason Cahill, directed by John Patterson and originally aired on January 31, 1999.

== Synopsis ==
Tony becomes increasingly paranoid over his sessions with Dr. Melfi, especially after seeing Silvio leaving a dentist's office opposite her suite. He is also becoming attracted to Melfi, and has corrupt police detective Vin Makazian secretly follow her. Makazian, who owes Tony money from gambling, assumes Melfi is Tony's mistress. When he sees her with a date he pulls the pair over, then assaults and arrests the man. Tony is beginning to consider quitting therapy, but Carmela—under the impression that Tony's therapist is male—insists he continue or risk their marriage.

Christopher is scared after his mock execution leaves him in a neck brace. He becomes more unnerved when he and Adriana discover Brendan's body. Assuming that Tony is punishing him for giving speed to Meadow, Christopher angrily confronts her; she assures him she has not told anyone. After finding that Uncle Junior and Mikey are responsible, Christopher demands revenge. Tony orders Christopher to stand down because Mikey is a made man but then assaults Mikey himself. He then confronts Junior, who rejects an offer of compromise and tells him he should "come heavy" (i.e. with a gun) for his next visit or not at all.

The prospect of war with Junior looms large for Tony, especially after Jackie, the DiMeo family's acting boss, dies without a clear successor. Tony has the backing of other DiMeo captains, but seeks a diplomatic resolution with his uncle. After some unwitting inspiration from Melfi about giving the elderly the "illusion of control", Tony cedes leadership of the family to Junior in exchange for his uncle's income-earning properties and contracts. War within the family is seemingly avoided while Junior becomes the primary target for federal investigations. Content with his decision, Tony opts to remain in therapy.

A.J. scuffles with a physically bigger classmate, Jeremy Piocosta. Jeremy backs down from a second formal fight and pays A.J. compensation for a shirt that was torn in the scuffle. A.J. is baffled by this. Meadow explains that Jeremy was not intimidated by A.J. but by Tony's reputation as a mobster. Tony had coincidentally run into Jeremy's father the day before at a plant nursery; Tony was friendly but happened to be holding an ax, and Jeremy's father quickly and nervously backed away. Meadow rhetorically asks A.J. how many other garbage men live in a house as expensive as theirs, showing him a Mafia-themed website. At Jackie's funeral, Meadow gives A.J. a knowing look and nods in the direction of the federal agents taking pictures.

== Starring ==
- James Gandolfini as Tony Soprano
- Lorraine Bracco as Dr. Jennifer Melfi
- Edie Falco as Carmela Soprano
- Michael Imperioli as Christopher Moltisanti
- Dominic Chianese as Corrado Soprano, Jr.
- Vincent Pastore as Pussy Bonpensiero
- Steven Van Zandt as Silvio Dante
- Tony Sirico as Paulie Gualtieri
- Robert Iler as Anthony Soprano, Jr.
- Jamie-Lynn Sigler as Meadow Soprano
- Nancy Marchand as Livia Soprano

=== Guest starring ===
- John Heard as Vin Makazian
- Jerry Adler as Hesh Rabkin
- Michael Rispoli as Jackie Aprile, Sr.
- Mark Blum as Randall Curtin

==== Also guest starring ====
- Al Sapienza as Mikey Palmice
- Anthony DeSando as Brendan Filone
- Drea de Matteo as Adriana La Cerva
- Tony Darrow as Larry Boy Barese
- George Loros as Raymond Curto
- Joe Badalucco, Jr. as Jimmy Altieri
- Sharon Angela as Rosalie Aprile
- John Arocho as Kid #2
- Oksana Lada as Irina Peltsin
- Michael Buscemi as Lewis Pantowski
- T.J. Coluca as Jeremy Piocosta
- Michele DeCesare as Hunter Scangarelo
- Guillermo Diaz as Salesperson
- Daniel Hilt as Kid #3
- Ray Michael Karl as Teacher
- Theresa Lynn as Stripper
- Shawn McLean as Yo Yo Mendez
- Annika Pergament as News Anchor
- Sal Petraccione as George Piocosta
- James Spector as Kid #1
- Corrine Stella as Woman
- Anthony Tavaglione as Lance

== Reception ==
Retrospectively, Emily St. James of The A.V. Club felt that although many elements of "Meadowlands" worked, the episode is "a bit of a step down from the previous three." She criticized the subplot involving AJ as "pretty pointless, playing out as a sort of miniature version of the Tony and Junior conflict and ending much the same way", but considered the overall episode to be "a pretty good summation of many of the things the show is going to be interested in going forward." Alan Sepinwall was highly positive, calling the resolution of the Tony and Junior conflict "an elegant solution, [...] and a great indicator of what a savvy tactician Tony is". Sepinwall also praised the final scene of "Meadowlands" as "a strong way to end an episode that's been all about the crumbling walls between Tony's work and home lives."

== Awards ==
Jason Cahill won a Writers Guild of America award for his work on this episode.
