= The Knight in White Satin Armor =

- The Sopranos episode
- Episode no.: Season 2 Episode 12
- Directed by: Allen Coulter
- Written by: Robin Green; Mitchell Burgess
- Cinematography by: Phil Abraham
- Production code: 212
- Original air date: April 2, 2000
- Running time: 60 minutes

Episode chronology
← Previous "House Arrest"	Next → "Funhouse"
- The Sopranos season 2

"The Knight in White Satin Armor" is the 12th episode of the second season of the HBO television series The Sopranos. It was written by Robin Green and Mitchell Burgess, and directed by Allen Coulter, and originally aired on April 2, 2000.

== Starring ==
- James Gandolfini as Tony Soprano
- Lorraine Bracco as Dr. Jennifer Melfi
- Edie Falco as Carmela Soprano
- Michael Imperioli as Christopher Moltisanti
- Dominic Chianese as Corrado Soprano, Jr.
- Vincent Pastore as Pussy Bonpensiero
- Steven Van Zandt as Silvio Dante
- Tony Sirico as Paulie Gualtieri*
- Robert Iler as Anthony Soprano, Jr.*
- Jamie-Lynn Sigler as Meadow Soprano
- Drea de Matteo as Adriana La Cerva
- David Proval as Richie Aprile
- Aida Turturro as Janice Soprano
- Nancy Marchand as Livia Soprano
- * = credited only

=== Guest starring ===
- Joe Penny as Victor Musto
- Joe Lisi as Dick Barone
- Louis Lombardi as Skip Lipari
- Richard Portnow as Attorney Melvoin
- Frank Pellegrino as Frank Cubitoso
- Oksana Lada as Irina Peltsin
- Federico Castelluccio as Furio Giunta
- Steve Schirripa as Bobby "Baccalà" Baccalieri
- Alla Kliouka as Svetlana
- Sharon Angela as Rosalie Aprile
- Katalin Pota as Lilliana
- Maureen Van Zandt as Gabriella Dante
- Andy Blankenbuehler as Richie Aprile, Jr.
- Jason Cerbone as Jackie Aprile, Jr.
- Richard Maldone as Albert Barese
- Adrian Martinez as Ramone

== Synopsis ==
Pussy turns against Tony, resenting the way he has been treated, and begins to behave like an FBI agent. When Christopher and an associate plan to hijack a shipment of Pokémon cards, Pussy spends the night trailing them. In the morning, a sleep-deprived Pussy crashes into another car, injuring his knee and knocking down a cyclist. Skip Lipari gets him out of trouble but angrily rebukes him: his duty is only to collect evidence against Tony.

Richie is penalized by Tony because he is still selling cocaine on his garbage routes, but for Uncle Junior the income from cocaine is his "lifeline". Richie suggests having Tony killed and says he can muster support from other dissatisfied crews. Junior permits him to raise the matter with capo Albert "Ally Boy" Barese, who is not persuaded. Alone, Junior thinks it over: he calculates that Richie, failing to "sell" the plan to Albert, is not respected; he, Junior, is better off with Tony. He tips Tony off, and Tony starts planning a hit on Richie with Silvio.

Richie and Janice spend a quarrelsome evening at home. She tells Richie that Tony does not want his children near him because of what he did to Beansie. Richie expresses disgust at the presumed homosexuality of his son, who is a dancer; Janice contradicts him, and he silences her with a punch to the mouth. She goes out of the room, comes back with a gun, and shoots Richie dead. In a panic, she phones Tony, who finds her crying over the body. He calls Christopher and Furio to dispose of the body. They dismember it with the meat-cutting equipment at Satriale's.

In the morning, Tony encounters Livia, in whose house Richie and Janice were staying, for the first time since her stroke. Tony explains that Richie has left; Livia smiles at a distraught Janice and says she knew it wouldn't last. She laughs when, on his way out, Tony stumbles down the stoop and falls on the front walk. Janice returns to Seattle.

Carmela contrives a meeting with Victor. She says that one day she might be free. She also thanks him for not going to her house for lunch, since she would've done something she'd regret later. As she leaves, she kisses him lightly on the cheek. Victor is greatly relieved when she has gone.

Loading the washing machine, Carmela smells Irina's perfume on Tony's clothes. However, he has had enough of Irina and breaks up with her. In response, Irina attempts suicide with vodka and pills. Tony goes to the hospital and comforts her. He then sends Silvio with a parting gift of $75,000. Irina's cousin, Svetlana Kirilenko, urges her to accept it.

== First appearances ==
- Jackie Aprile, Jr.: Richie's nephew and son of Rosalie Aprile and the late Jackie Aprile, Sr.
- Albert Barese: Acting capo of the Barese crew while his cousin Larry Boy Barese is under indictment.
- Svetlana Kirilenko: The cousin of Tony's comàre, Irina.

== Deceased ==
- Richie Aprile: shot by Janice after he punched her in the mouth for defending his son being a ballroom dancer.

== Title reference ==
- The phrase is first spoken by Irina in College. She confuses the set phrase "knight in shining armor" and the Moody Blues song "Nights in White Satin".
- White satin can also be interpreted as an allusion to Janice, who is preparing for her wedding in the episode and appears in her wedding dress in one scene.
- The Moody Blues are also sampled on the 1976 Giorgio Moroder album “Knights in White Satin”, which may be another title reference. The prior episode “From Where to Eternity” may have also referenced another Moroder album.

== Cultural references ==
- Junior mentions "old man Profaci" Joe Profaci when Richie cannot "sell" the plan.
- Tony sarcastically comments that Junior is a double-agent like Matt Helm.
- When Silvio gives the money to Irina, he urges her to get on with her life, telling her: "lt's not too good to get hung up on any one thing. On the other hand, something new always comes along ... It's called passages. It's a book." He is referring the title of Gail Sheehy's Passages.

== Music ==
- The music being played when Rick and Juliet are ballroom dancing is "The Paris Suite Soundtrack" from the album Forget Paris.
- The song played over the end credits and during Richie and Janice's engagement party is "I Saved the World Today" (1999) by Eurythmics.
- "The Memory Remains" by Metallica is playing in the background at the Bada Bing.

== Filming locations ==
Listed in order of first appearance:

- Livingston, New Jersey
- Kearny, New Jersey
- Newark, New Jersey
- Paterson, New Jersey
- Verona, New Jersey
- Satriale's Pork Store in Kearny, New Jersey
- Newark Penn Station

== Awards ==
- Allen Coulter was nominated for the Primetime Emmy Award for Outstanding Directing for a Drama Series for his direction in "The Knight in White Satin Armor." Mitchell Burgess and Robin Green were nominated for Outstanding Writing for a Drama Series and William B. Stich received a nomination for Outstanding Single-Camera Picture Editing for a Drama Series.
