= The Happy Wanderer (The Sopranos) =

- The Sopranos episode
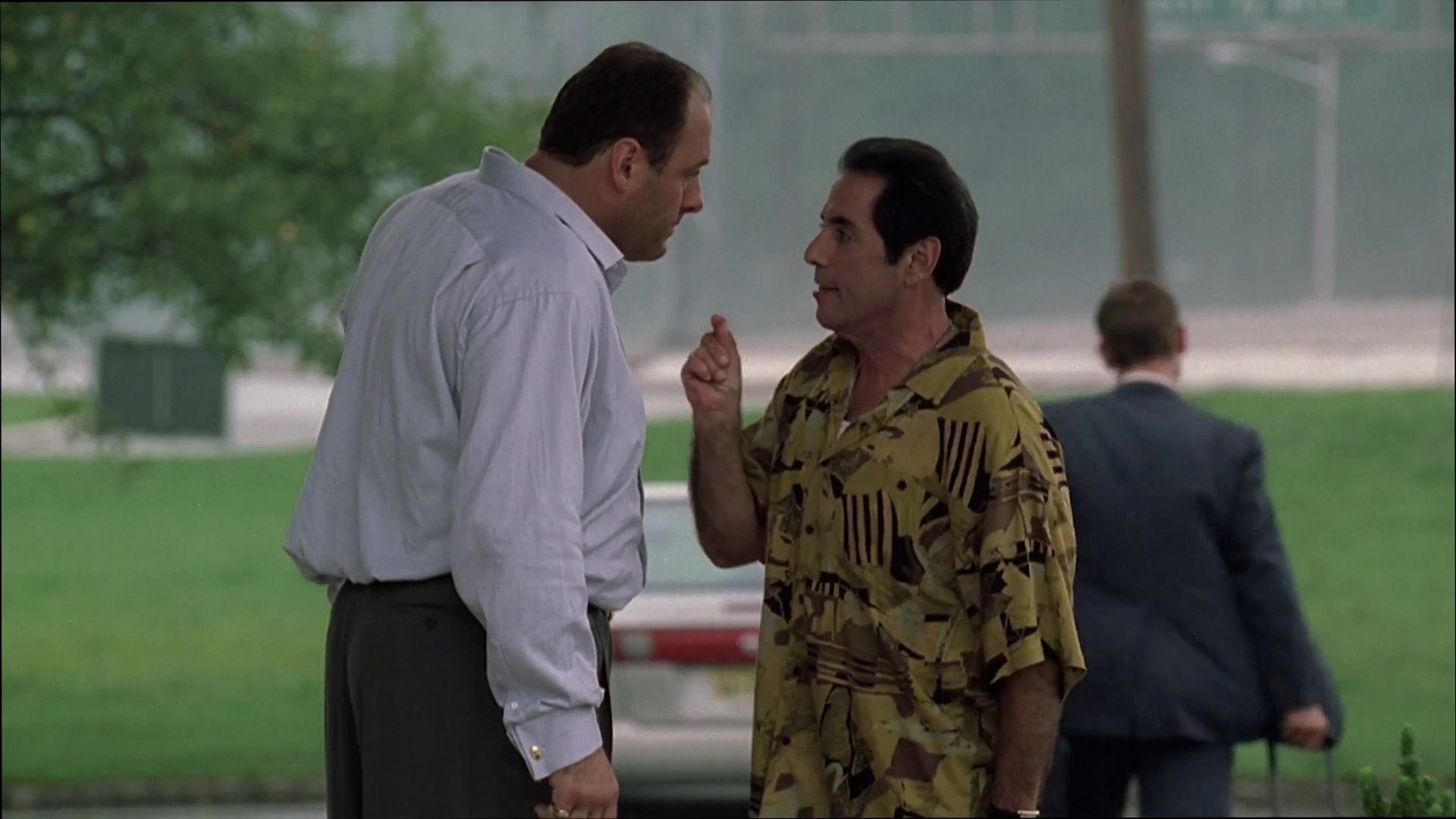
- Tony Soprano confronts Richie Aprile
- Episode no.: Season 2 Episode 6
- Directed by: John Patterson
- Written by: Frank Renzulli
- Cinematography by: Phil Abraham
- Production code: 206
- Original air date: February 20, 2000
- Running time: 50 minutes

Episode chronology
← Previous "Big Girls Don't Cry"	Next → "D-Girl"
- The Sopranos season 2

"The Happy Wanderer" is the 19th episode of the HBO original series The Sopranos and the sixth of the show's second season. It was written by Frank Renzulli, directed by John Patterson, and originally aired on February 20, 2000.

== Starring ==
- James Gandolfini as Tony Soprano
- Lorraine Bracco as Dr. Jennifer Melfi
- Edie Falco as Carmela Soprano
- Michael Imperioli as Christopher Moltisanti
- Dominic Chianese as Junior Soprano
- Vincent Pastore as Pussy Bonpensiero
- Steven Van Zandt as Silvio Dante
- Tony Sirico as Paulie Gualtieri
- Robert Iler as A.J. Soprano
- Jamie-Lynn Sigler as Meadow Soprano
- Drea de Matteo as Adriana La Cerva
- David Proval as Richie Aprile
- Aida Turturro as Janice Soprano
- Nancy Marchand as Livia Soprano

=== Guest starring ===
- John Ventimiglia as Artie Bucco

==== Also guest starring ====
- Robert Patrick as David Scatino
- Lillo Brancato Jr. as Matt Bevilaqua
- Chris Tardio as Sean Gismonte
- Federico Castelluccio as Furio
- Nicole Burdette as Barbara Giglione
- John Hensley as Eric Scatino
- Marissa Redanty as Christine Scatino
- Felix Solis as Fishman
- Vincent Curatola as Johnny Sack
- Paul Mazursky as Sunshine
- Frank Sinatra, Jr. as himself
- Lewis J. Stadlen as Dr. Ira Fried
- Adam Alexi-Malle as College Representative
- P.J. Brown as Cop
- Angela Covington as Gudren
- Joseph R. Gannascoli as Vito Spatafore
- Barbara Gulan as Mrs. Gaetano
- La Tanya Hall as Hooker
- Sig Libowitz as Hillel
- David McCann as Priest
- Carmine Sirico as Dealer
- Ed Vassallo as Tom Giglione

== Synopsis ==
Tony tells Dr. Melfi that he is angry with everybody, but doesn't know why; he wants to hit her, and the happy-looking people he sees in the street. Tony is told by Uncle Junior that he and Tony's father had a deceased brother, Ercole, who was, in Junior's word, "slow". He also tells Tony that his father left a "package" of money to his mother, Livia. Tony is uncomfortable when he sees Livia at a funeral and later during a cabaret night at Meadow's high school.

Davey Scatino, a former classmate of Tony's, owns a sporting goods store; his son, Eric, is a classmate of Meadow's and they are going to sing a duet at the cabaret night. Davey, a compulsive gambler, repeatedly asks Tony to be let in on gambling action. Tony, seemingly aware of Davey's gambling addiction, rebuffs him. Davey owes Richie $8,000 and has been banned from Richie's poker game until the debt has been paid. Davey knows that Tony has taken over the high-stakes "Executive Game" from Junior; he turns up uninvited and asks to join in. Tony consents and lends him $5,000. Davey wins at first and the game goes on through the night while Tony is asleep.

Tony wakes in the morning and is told by Christopher that Davey is down $45,000 after talking his way into more loans. Richie comes into the room, sees Davey playing and attacks him, which causes the game to break up. For this act of disrespect, Tony tells Richie that he is not permitted to collect his debt from Davey until Tony has collected his. Janice tells Richie he has a right to stand up to Tony. Davey attempts to talk to Tony as a friend, but Tony rebuffs him.

When Davey misses the first deadline for payment, Tony goes to his office at the store and beats him. Davey finds a pretext to take Eric's SUV away from him and gives it to Tony as partial payment. Tony presents it to Meadow, but she realizes it belongs to Eric and tearfully rejects it. At the cabaret night, Eric refuses at the last minute to perform with Meadow and walks out, leaving Meadow to perform a solo, as she had wished.

== First appearances ==
- Vito Spatafore: Richie Aprile's nephew, who is also in his crew.
- David Scatino: Tony's childhood friend and compulsive gambler.
- Dr. Ira Fried: A player in the Executive Game and doctor specialized in treating erectile dysfunction. Also performs emergency surgeries for mob-related injuries.

== Deceased ==
- Tom Giglione, Sr.: Tony's brother-in-law's father, who died after falling off a roof.

== Title reference ==
- The episode's title refers to a "happy wanderer", a person who walks around with no worries in the world, whom Tony despises.

== Production ==
- Though this is Joseph R. Gannascoli's first appearance as Vito, he previously had appeared briefly as Gino, a bakery customer, in a scene during the first season episode, "The Legend of Tennessee Moltisanti." He would not be credited as a main cast member until Season 6.
- Tony Sirico's real-life older brother Carmine appears as the nameless "Dealer" in Richie's small-stakes poker game. His few words of dialogue are spoken off camera.

== Cultural references ==
- Junior says Ercole was a derivation of Hercules, and that Ercole was strong like a bull and handsome like George Raft.
- Silvio, becoming increasingly agitated during a losing night of poker, explodes when Matt Bevilaqua attempts to sweep up crumbs beneath him and yells at Tony: "I'm losin' my balls over here. This fuckin' moron's playing Hazel?" Hazel was a hit 1960s TV show starring Shirley Booth as a maid.
- When Eric Scatino opts out of performing the "Sun and Moon" duet with Meadow, the emcee announces that Meadow will, instead, sing the solo "My Heart Will Go On", from the 1997 film Titanic. Also, during the "Executive Game" of poker, Paulie makes a joke about Viagra being used to "raise" the real Titanic.
- Tony once again mentions his role model, actor Gary Cooper, to Dr. Melfi.
- Dr. Melfi quotes philosopher Carlos Castaneda, who Tony confuses with "a prizefighter".

== Music ==
- The song sung by Gudren, the blonde soprano, after Meadow and Eric's on-stage rehearsal and again at the beginning of the concert, is "Gretchen am Spinnrade" by Franz Schubert.
- The Muzak version of "Spinning Wheel" by Blood, Sweat, & Tears is playing in the store when Richie comes to collect payment from Davey. Paulie later misquotes this song in the season six episode Stage 5.
- When Eric picks up Meadow, he is listening to "Down" by Stone Temple Pilots.
- The duet that Meadow and Eric are practicing is "Sun and Moon" from the musical Miss Saigon.
- The song "Love Is Strange" by Mickey & Sylvia is playing in the background when Davey goes to Artie's restaurant seeking a loan from him.
- The song "Tequila Sunrise" by Eagles is playing in the store when Tony goes to collect his first payment from Davey.
- The song played over the closing credits is a version of "The Happy Wanderer" sung by Frankie Yankovic.

== Filming locations ==
Listed in order of first appearance:

- Clifton High School in Clifton, New Jersey
- Washington Middle School in Harrison, New Jersey
- Ramsey Outdoor in Paramus, New Jersey
- Newark, New Jersey
- Wayne, New Jersey
- Fair Lawn, New Jersey
- North Caldwell, New Jersey
- Belleville, New Jersey
- Long Island City, Queens

== Awards ==
James Gandolfini won his first Primetime Emmy Award for Outstanding Lead Actor in a Drama Series for his performance in this episode.
