= Big Girls Don't Cry (The Sopranos) =

- The Sopranos episode
- Episode no.: Season 2 Episode 5
- Directed by: Tim Van Patten
- Written by: Terence Winter
- Cinematography by: Phil Abraham
- Production code: 205
- Original air date: February 13, 2000
- Running time: 51 minutes

Episode chronology
← Previous "Commendatori"	Next → "The Happy Wanderer"
- The Sopranos season 2

"Big Girls Don't Cry" is the eighteenth episode of the HBO original series The Sopranos and is the fifth of the show's second season. It was written by Terence Winter, directed by Tim Van Patten and originally aired on February 13, 2000.

== Starring ==
- James Gandolfini as Tony Soprano
- Lorraine Bracco as Dr. Jennifer Melfi
- Edie Falco as Carmela Soprano
- Michael Imperioli as Christopher Moltisanti
- Dominic Chianese as Corrado Soprano, Jr.
- Vincent Pastore as Pussy Bonpensiero
- Steven Van Zandt as Silvio Dante
- Tony Sirico as Paulie Gualtieri
- Robert Iler as Anthony Soprano, Jr.
- Jamie-Lynn Sigler as Meadow Soprano *
- Drea de Matteo as Adriana La Cerva
- David Proval as Richie Aprile
- Aida Turturro as Janice Soprano
- Nancy Marchand as Livia Soprano *

* = credit only

=== Guest starring ===
- Jerry Adler as Hesh Rabkin
- Kathrine Narducci as Charmaine Bucco
- John Ventimiglia as Artie Bucco

==== Also guest starring ====
- Peter Bogdanovich as Dr. Elliot Kupferberg
- Linda Emond as Dahlia
- Louis Lombardi as Skip Lipari
- Oksana Lada as Irina Peltsin
- Federico Castelluccio as Furio
- Vincent Curatola as Johnny Sack
- Steve R. Schirripa as Bobby Baccalieri
- John Fiore as Gigi Cestone
- Stephen Payne as Dominic
- Lydia Gaston as Rosie
- Sasha Nesterov as Russian Man
- Elena Antonenko as Russian Woman
- Oni Faida Lampley as Cynthia
- Scott Lucy as Acting Student
- Ajay Naidu as Omar
- Robert Prescott as Mitch
- Phyllis Somerville as Brenda

== Synopsis ==
Adriana is proud of Christopher's screenwriting and enrolls him in an acting course. He is applauded for his acting in an emotional scene from Rebel Without a Cause in which he plays a son with his father. When a student asks how he managed to seemingly cry on cue, an embarrassed Christopher walks out. In the next class, while playing another scene with the student who had played his father, Christopher violently beats him. Adriana suggests this was because he was angry with his father for dying when Christopher was young. That night he throws away everything he has written.

Furio is now in New Jersey as a soldier with the DiMeo crime family. Christopher has been making collections from the owner of a tanning salon that is used to front a brothel, but payments have been short. Tony sends Furio to obtain the money owed. Furio breaks the owner's arm and shoots him in the kneecap, then hits and spits on his wife. With Furio's arrival, Tony promotes Paulie and Silvio Dante, but refuses to promote Pussy. Pussy sees this as a betrayal and complains to Agent Lipari, who feels he has been passed over in his job as well. Sympathizing with each other, each complains about the declining standards of his own organization.

Tony becomes irate when he learns that Janice is using their mother's house as security for a loan. He goes to the house early one morning to confront her. He is taken aback when the door is opened by Richie, who says that he and Janice have revived their previous relationship. Tony leaves, saying with disgust, "She's your fucking problem now."

Tony visits Hesh Rabkin, seeking the comfort and guidance from him that he is not getting from Dr. Melfi. Hesh is sympathetic and tells Tony that his father also had panic attacks. However, Hesh gets bored listening to Tony and rambles on about his own experiences.

Dr. Melfi consults Dr. Kupferberg in order to understand her feelings about Tony. Eventually, she decides to resume treating him. During their first session, while questions are being asked and answered, it seems they cannot stop smiling at each other.

== Title reference ==
- The episode's title is taken from the name of a song by Frankie Valli and the Four Seasons, which is playing in the background during the restaurant scene in the episode. Valli would later have a role on the series as Rusty Millio.

== Music ==
- The song played in the background of Artie's restaurant is the titular song of the episode, "Big Girls Don't Cry" by The Four Seasons.
- The song playing when Christopher enters the tanning salon is "Touch It" by Monifah.
- The song from Dr. Melfi's dream about Tony Soprano is "Optimistic Voices", a selection from the 1939 film classic, The Wizard of Oz.
- The song played during Furio's party is "Rock the Boat" by The Hues Corporation.
- The song played over the end credits is "White Mustang II" by Daniel Lanois.

== Filming locations ==
Listed in order of first appearance:

- Kearny, New Jersey
- Lou Costello Memorial in Paterson, New Jersey
- Long Island City, Queens
- Verona, New Jersey
- Glen Head, New York
- Great Kills, Staten Island
