= Funhouse (The Sopranos) =

- The Sopranos episode
- Episode no.: Season 2 Episode 13
- Directed by: John Patterson
- Written by: David Chase; Todd A. Kessler
- Cinematography by: Phil Abraham
- Production code: 213
- Original air date: April 9, 2000
- Running time: 59 minutes

Episode chronology
← Previous "The Knight in White Satin Armor"	Next → "Mr. Ruggerio's Neighborhood"
- The Sopranos season 2

"Funhouse" is the 26th episode of the HBO television series The Sopranos, and the season finale of the show's second season. It was co-written by series creator/executive producer David Chase and co-producer Todd A. Kessler, and directed by frequent The Sopranos director John Patterson, and originally aired in the United States on April 9, 2000, attracting about 9 million viewers.

== Starring ==
- James Gandolfini as Tony Soprano
- Lorraine Bracco as Dr. Jennifer Melfi
- Edie Falco as Carmela Soprano
- Michael Imperioli as Christopher Moltisanti
- Dominic Chianese as Corrado Soprano, Jr.
- Vincent Pastore as Pussy Bonpensiero
- Steven Van Zandt as Silvio Dante
- Tony Sirico as Paulie Gualtieri
- Robert Iler as Anthony Soprano, Jr.
- Jamie-Lynn Sigler as Meadow Soprano
- Drea de Matteo as Adriana La Cerva
- Nancy Marchand as Livia Soprano

=== Guest starring ===
- Jerry Adler as Hesh Rabkin
- John Ventimiglia as Artie Bucco

==== Also guest starring ====
- Sofia Milos as Annalisa
- Louis Lombardi as Skip Lipari
- Frank Pellegrino as Frank Cubitoso
- Nicole Burdette as Barbara Giglione
- Federico Castelluccio as Furio Giunta
- Dan Grimaldi as Patsy Parisi
- Tom Aldredge as Hugo DeAngelis
- John Fiore as Gigi Cestone
- Toni Kalem as Angie Bonpensiero
- Robert LuPone as Bruce Cusamano
- David Margulies as Neil Mink
- Matt Servitto as Agent Dwight Harris
- Suzanne Shepherd as Mary DeAngelis
- Maureen Van Zandt as Gabriella Dante
- Barbara Andres as Quintina Blundetto
- David Anzuelo as Flight Attendant
- Kathleen Fasolino as Leah
- Ray Garvey as Airport Guard
- David Healy as Vice Principal White
- Sig Libowitz as Hillel
- Ajay Mehta as Sundeep Kumar
- Jay Palit as Indian Man
- Robert Patrick as David Scatino

== Synopsis ==
Tony is sick from food poisoning, and he has vivid fever dreams. In one he is having sex with Dr. Melfi in her office. In another, a dead fish on a slab speaks to him with Pussy's voice and says he is working for the government because Tony passed him over for promotion. As soon as he can, Tony goes with Silvio to Pussy's home. Pretending he is still sick, Tony rushes to the toilet; while the rest are downstairs, he searches the bedroom and finds Pussy's wire.

Tony says he wants Pussy and Silvio to see a boat he is thinking of buying, and the three of them drive to it. Paulie is already there. They take the boat out to open water. In the cabin, Tony confronts Pussy about flipping. He equivocates, but then admits that he told the police about the crew's current money-earning scam involving telephone calling cards. He asks for a drink and Tony permits it; he tells a smutty story and the guys laugh, though Tony asks if it was really true. He goes to the other end of the cabin and, while he is asking if he can sit down, Tony, followed by Silvio and Paulie, shoots him dead. Paulie removes his identifying jewelry, and together they bind his bagged body in chains and weights, throw him off the back of the boat, and watch him sink into the ocean.

Shortly after Janice's departure, Tony and his younger sister Barbara arrive at Livia's home to discuss her permanent living arrangements. Barbara's husband won't allow her to live with them and the retirement home will not have her back. Angrily, Tony gives her two airline tickets with which she and her sister can fly first-class to Tucson, where another sister is living. But the tickets were obtained through the bust-out of Davey's store, and Livia is detained at Newark International Airport for possessing stolen airline tickets. FBI agents arrive at Tony's home with a search warrant and he is led away handcuffed in front of Meadow and some of her friends. She has graduated from high school and the graduation ceremony and party are the next day but, reassured by his lawyer, he is released in time for both.

At the ceremony, Tony tells Christopher that he is putting him up to become a made man. Uncle Junior comes to wish Meadow and Tony asks him to leave before Carmela spots him. Tony also meets a rather haggard looking Davey, whose wife has left him: he is going to work "on a ranch out West". His son, who was accepted by Georgetown University, is going to Montclair State University instead because of "a money pinch".

The episode ends with Tony and his compatriots blowing cigar smoke at Meadow's graduation party intermingled with a montage of scenes from the first two seasons of the show.

== First appearances ==
- Quintina Blundetto: Younger sister of Livia Soprano and mother of Tony's cousin Tony Blundetto.
- Pasquale "Patsy" Parisi: Soldier in the Soprano/Gualtieri crew and twin brother of the deceased Philly "Spoons" Parisi.

== Deceased ==
- Salvatore "Big Pussy" Bonpensiero: murdered by Tony, Silvio and Paulie for being an FBI informant. His body was then weighted down and tossed into the ocean.

== Title reference ==
- In Tony's dream, he is on the boardwalk in Asbury Park, near the Palace Amusements funhouse with the famous wide-eyed clown painted on it known as "Tillie".
- In the scene when Tony's mother calls his home for help about the stolen airline tickets, Carmela answers the phone. When she hands the phone to Tony, she says: "Fun never stops".

== Production ==
- David Proval and Aida Turturro are no longer billed in the opening credits, although Turturro returns next season as a full-time cast member.
- This is the last episode to air while Nancy Marchand was alive. Her season 3 appearance used old archived footage.
- This episode contains a dream sequence where Tony Soprano interacts with the talking fishes. They were utilized in CG visual effects done by Blue Sky Studios, the company that would go on to create the Ice Age series.

== References to past episodes ==
- Just as in the season opener, "Guy Walks Into a Psychiatrist's Office...", Silvio does his The Godfather Part III Michael Corleone impersonation in the dream.
- Tony's dream where Pussy appears as a fish, saying that the other fishes around him are "asleep" mirror a quote from The Godfather which Pussy corrected to Christopher while helping to dispose of Emil Kolar's corpse in the pilot episode: "Luca Brasi sleeps with the fishes".

== Historical reference ==
- Speaking to Neil Mink, Tony mentions "that EgyptAir thing". This refers to EgyptAir Flight 990, a flight from Los Angeles to Cairo via New York City which crashed in October 1999 under controversial circumstances in the Atlantic Ocean near Nantucket.

== Music ==
- The song played throughout the episode, including the end credits, is "Thru and Thru" from the 1994 album Voodoo Lounge by The Rolling Stones (and is sung by Keith Richards).
- The song played on the radio of Tony's car and in his last "fever dream" is "Free Fallin'" by Tom Petty.
- The song that Pussy puts in the CD player and plays in the background while he confesses to being an informant is "Baubles, Bangles and Beads" by Frank Sinatra and Tom Jobim.
- The song Meadow listens to on the radio in her room while she is sulking after Tony is arrested in front of her friends is "Diamonds & Rust" by Joan Baez.
- Tony deliriously sings the theme song from Gilligan's Island as he falls asleep after Dr. Cusamano visits his house to diagnose his illness.
- When Tony leaves Dr. Melfi's office after retaliating when he feels she insulted him, he sings "Maybe Baby" by Buddy Holly and The Crickets.
- After killing Pussy Bonpensiero, Tony watches a 1960s broadcast of The Temptations on television, performing "Ain't Too Proud to Beg".

== Filming locations ==
Listed in order of first appearance:

- Verona, New Jersey
- Jersey City, New Jersey
- Belleville Turnpike Bridge over the Passaic River
- Long Island City, Queens
- Asbury Park, New Jersey
- Asbury Park Convention Hall
- Meadowlands Racetrack (as Newark International Airport)
- Monmouth Beach, New Jersey
- Newark, New Jersey
- Wayne, New Jersey

== Reception ==
=== Critical response ===
Entertainment Weekly placed "Funhouse" #5 on their list of the 10 greatest The Sopranos episodes; Time placed it at #9.

It was nominated for an Emmy Award in the category of Outstanding Writing for a Drama Series.

=== Awards ===
- This episode was one of two viewer's choice winners on A&E, along with "Pine Barrens".
