= Jason Cahill =

American television writer and producer

Jason Cahill is an American television writer and producer, who is best known for his work on the acclaimed HBO series The Sopranos and on the FOX science fiction series Fringe.

== Career ==
Jason Cahill began his writing career on the short-lived CTV series Two in 1996 and then moved to NBC where he contributed scripts for ER and Profiler, where he also worked as an executive story editor. He has also worked on series such as NYPD Blue and Surface.

=== Work on The Sopranos ===
Cahill served as executive story editor on 5 episodes of the first season of The Sopranos. He wrote 3 episodes of the show:

- "Meadowlands" (1.04)
- "Boca" (1.09) (with Robin Green & Mitchell Burgess)
- "Guy Walks Into a Psychiatrist's Office..." (2.01)

=== Work on Fringe ===
- "Power Hungry" (1.05) (with co-written by co-executive producer Julia Cho)
- "Safe" (1.10) (co-written by co-executive producer David H. Goodman)

== Filmography ==
Year	Title	Credited as		Notes
Year	Title	Writer	Producer	Notes
1996	Two	Yes	No	Wrote: "No Man's Land"
1996–97	ER	Yes	No	Wrote 3 episodes
1997	Nothing Sacred	Yes	No	Wrote: "Calling"
1997	NYPD Blue	Yes	No	Wrote: "Dead Man Talking"
1998–99	Profiler	Yes	Yes	Co-producer, wrote 4 episodes Also executive story editor
1999–2000	The Sopranos	Yes	No	Executive story editor, wrote 3 episodes
2005–06	Surface	Yes	Yes	Consulting producer, wrote: "Episode 5"
2007	Cane	No	Yes	Co-executive producer
2008–09	Fringe	Yes	Yes	Consulting producer, wrote 2 episodes
2014–15	Halt and Catch Fire	Yes	Yes	Co-executive producer, wrote 4 episodes
2017	Fear the Walking Dead	No	Yes	Consulting producer
2022–present	The Lord of the Rings: The Rings of Power	Yes	Executive	Wrote 3 episodes
