= John Patterson (director) =

American television and film director (1940–2005)

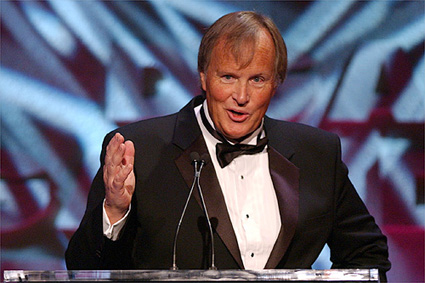
- Born: John Tiffin Patterson; April 4, 1940; Buffalo, New York, U.S.
- Died: February 7, 2005 (aged 64); Los Angeles, California, U.S.
- Occupation: Television director
- Years active: 1974–2005
- Children: Charles Falk Patterson, Mary Denise Patterson

John Tiffin Patterson (April 4, 1940 – February 7, 2005) was a television director known for his work on drama series, who also made television films. He directed thirteen episodes of The Sopranos, including the first five season finales. Patterson was born in Buffalo, New York.

== Biography ==
Aged 19, Patterson joined the United States Air Force where he navigated B-52 bombers for the Strategic Air Command. He resumed his college studies while a reservist and graduated from the University at Buffalo. He earned a master's degree at Stanford University in 1970, where he was a classmate of The Sopranos creator David Chase.

He was nominated for the Emmy award in 2002 and 2003 for his work on The Sopranos but he lost, and won The Directors Guild of America award for the show in 2002. As a director, Patterson worked for several television studios, including HBO and CBS. He directed episodes of The Sopranos, Providence, The Practice, Carnivàle, Family Law, Six Feet Under, CSI, CHiPs, Magnum P.I., Hill Street Blues, The Guardian, and the pilot episode of Law & Order. He also directed more than 12 television movies, usually thrillers and crime stories, including A Deadly Silence (1989) and Seduced By Madness (1996).

He was married to Casey Kelley, but they later divorced; they had two children named Mary and Charlie Patterson. Patterson died in Los Angeles, California of prostate cancer at the age of 64.

Season 6 episode 12 of The Sopranos, titled "Kaisha", was dedicated to him.

== Selected filmography ==
- The Sopranos, 13 episodes directed by John Tiffin Patterson
  - Episode 1.04 "Meadowlands"
  - Episode 1.13 "I Dream of Jeannie Cusamano"
  - Episode 2.06 "The Happy Wanderer"
  - Episode 2.10 "Bust Out"
  - Episode 2.13 "Funhouse"
  - Episode 3.04 "Employee of the Month"
  - Episode 3.13 "Army of One"
  - Episode 4.02 "No Show"
  - Episode 4.07 "Watching Too Much Television"
  - Episode 4.13 "Whitecaps"
  - Episode 5.03 "Where's Johnny?"
  - Episode 5.08 "Marco Polo"
  - Episode 5.13 "All Due Respect"
- Six Feet Under:
  - Episode 1.03 "The Foot"
- Providence episodes:
  - "The Birthday Party"
  - "The Honeymoon's Over"
  - "Runaway Sydney"
  - "Saint Syd"
- Love, Honor & Obey: The Last Mafia Marriage (1993)
- Grave Secrets: The Legacy of Hilltop Drive (1992)
- Sins of the Mother (1991 TV movie) starring Elizabeth Montgomery, Dale Midkiff and Heather Fairfield
- She Said No (1990 TV Movie) concerning acquaintance rape and starring Veronica Hamel, Lee Grant, Ray Baker, and Judd Hirsch
- Law & Order "Everybody's Favorite Bagman" (series pilot) Episode 01.06 - written by Dick Wolf (produced 1988, aired 1990)
- Hill Street Blues "A Wasted Weekend" Episode 7.12 - written by David Mamet (1987)
