= Satriale's Pork Store =

Fictional butchery

- The Sopranos organization
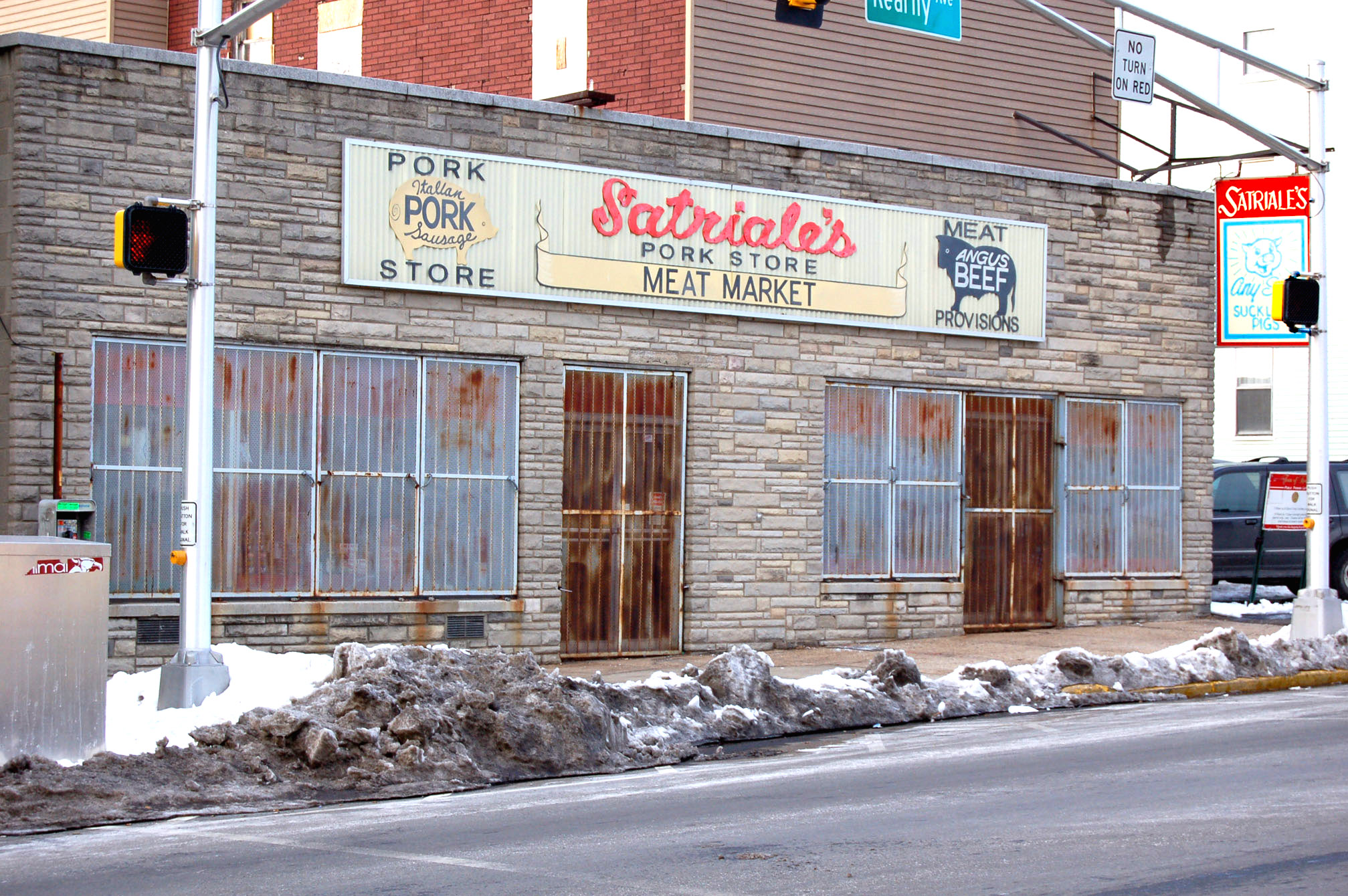
- The building used in the show, photographed in 2007.
- First appearance: "46 Long"

In-universe information
- Type: Italian meat market
- Address: 101 Kearny Avenue
- Location: Kearny, New Jersey
- Owner: DiMeo crime family
- Purpose: Legitimate business front

Satriale's Pork Store is a fictional establishment on the HBO series The Sopranos. During the 1970s, the pork store was taken over by Johnny Soprano, a capo in the DiMeo crime family, when Francis Satriale failed to make payments on a gambling debt. It became a regular hangout for current members of the DiMeo crime family.

The filming location was in Kearny, New Jersey. Satriale's Pork Store was recreated at 42 Market Street in Paterson (40°54′54.6″N 74°10′33.9″W) in 2019 for the filming of The Many Saints of Newark, a prequel to The Sopranos.

== Location ==
Satriale's Pork Store is a meat market in Kearny, New Jersey. Although a mob-owned establishment, Satriale's runs a legitimate business, selling a variety of meats, including pork and sausage, as well as deli-style sandwiches. The store also has a coffee bar that sells pastries and espresso, as seen in several episodes. In the large storefront windows hang cured hams and trussed pig carcasses, coils of pink-and-beige sausages, and other miscellaneous meats, including a denuded chicken with its beak still in place.

In the pilot episode, Silvio Dante tells Tony, Paulie, and the gang that his wife Gabriella Dante sends him to the store regularly because she thinks it sells the best capicola. FBI Agent Dwight Harris, who investigates Tony Soprano and the members of his family throughout the show, loves their veal parmesan sandwiches.

In the episode "Toodle-Fucking-Oo", Silvio tells Richie Aprile that Tony no longer discusses mob business directly with his capos, using Silvio Dante as an intermediary, and never discusses mob business at Satriale's anymore because of FBI surveillance. Satriale's is prominently featured in the video game The Sopranos: Road to Respect.

The interior walls of the storeroom where Emil "E-Mail" Kolar is murdered by Christopher Moltisanti have black and white framed photographs of classic actors and entertainers, like Humphrey Bogart, Frank Sinatra, Edward G. Robinson, and Dean Martin, hanging on the walls.

Satriale's is possibly based on Sacco's Meat Market located at 806 3rd Avenue in Elizabeth, New Jersey, which served as the unofficial criminal headquarters of "Uncle Joe" Giacobbe, a veteran made man in the DeCavalcante crime family.

== Production ==
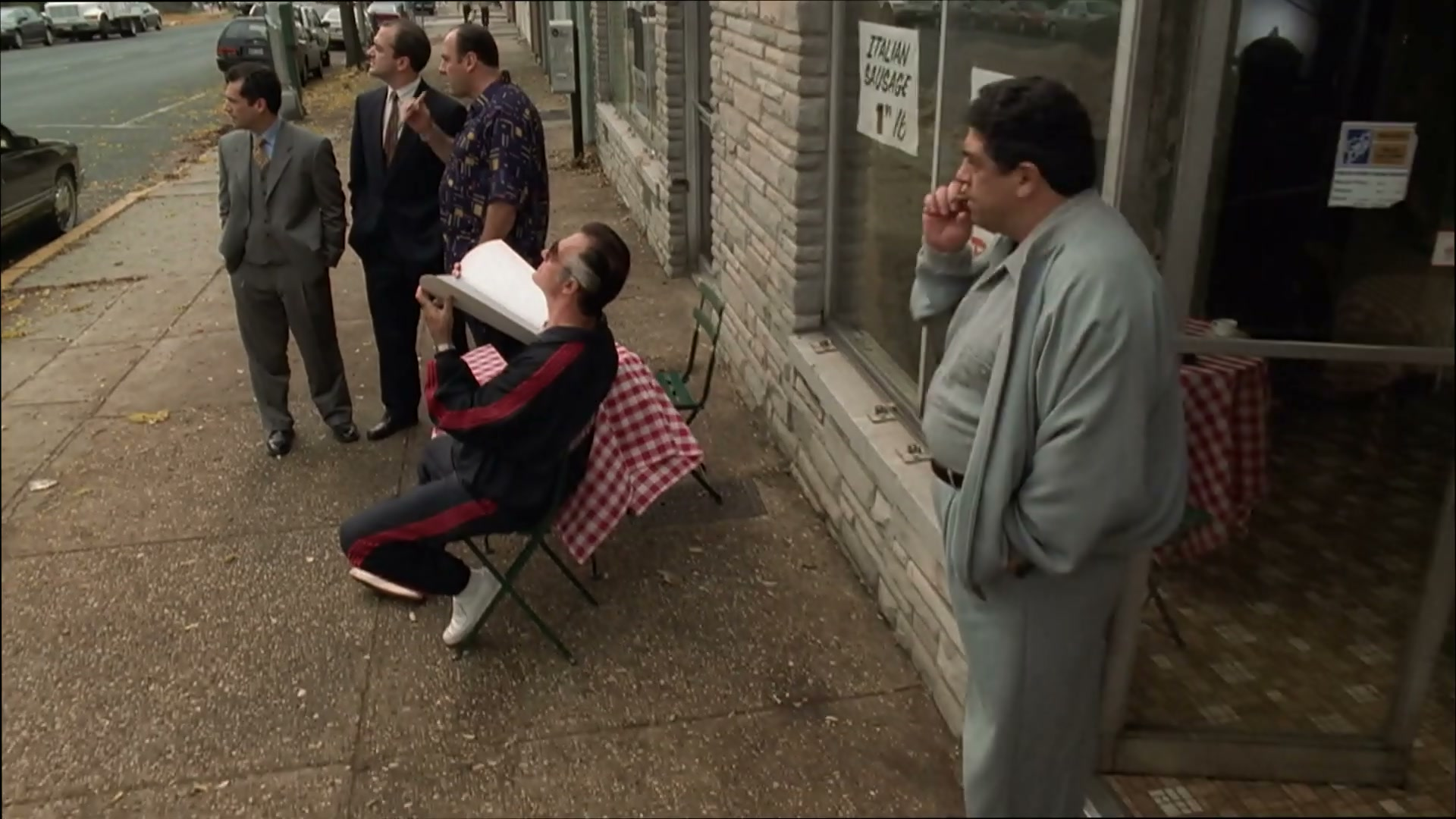
Characters from The Sopranos lounging in front of Satriale's

The pork store was called Centanni's Meat Market (40°39′30.6″N 74°12′16.2″W) in the pilot episode, an actual butchery in Elizabeth, New Jersey. After the series was picked up by HBO, the producers leased a building with a store front in Kearny, New Jersey which served as the shooting location for exterior and interior scenes for the remainder of production, renamed Satriale's Pork Store. After the series ended, the building was demolished.

Following the demolition, the property owner sold bricks as souvenirs. The location inspired a deli of the same name in Sydney, Australia.

== Important events that occurred in Satriale's ==
- Tony Soprano witnessed a violent encounter involving Mr. Satriale and his father, leading to his first panic attack later that day.
- Christopher Moltisanti shot his first victim, Emil Kolar, in the rear of the store.
- Silvio Dante and Paulie Gualtieri beat Ariel, the son-in-law of Shlomo Teittleman in a room on the upper floor of the store and debate with Tony whether or not to murder him.
- After an explosive argument where Tony yells at Christopher and Brendan Filone about their successful hijacking of a Comley Trucking transport truck, a trucking company that operates under the "protection" of Tony's uncle Corrado Soprano, Brendan is picked up and thrown out of the back room and into the kitchen where he rolls over a table of fresh meat chops. He made the statement that Tony is really the boss of the family since Jackie Aprile Sr. became the "Chemo-sabe", a reference to Jackie's cancer. This greatly angers Tony.
- Christopher and Furio Giunta disposed of Richie Aprile's remains by using the meat saw and butcher's knives to dismember his body.
- Tony and Ralph Cifaretto are forced to make a decision regarding Jackie Aprile, Jr.'s future.
- Finn revealed to Tony and other capos and associates his encounter with Vito two years prior when Vito was giving oral sex to a security guard in a car. Finn's story played a pivotal role in determining whether the rumors of Vito's sexuality were true.
- Tony meets with Bobby Baccalieri to discuss the takeover of Corrado Soprano's businesses and where the DiMeo crime family stands at that time.
- Silvio Dante and Carlo Gervasi murder Lupertazzi family soldier Fat Dom Gamiello after he makes a series of jokes concerning Vito's murder and the sexual preferences of New Jersey men.
- Tony Blundetto gives Silvio Dante, Paulie Gualtieri, and Vito Spatafore back massages and angers Tony Soprano by speaking back to him in front of his fellow mobsters.
- Agent Harris plies Tony for information on suspected terrorists and warns him about the attempt on his life from Phil Leotardo.
- Salvatore "Big Pussy" Bonpensiero dresses as Santa Claus for the neighborhood children and gives out toys every Christmas. During one Christmas Eve Salvatore becomes drunk and temperamental angering some of the children. It is later surmised that Bonpensiero was wearing a secretly hidden FBI wire on his person during the festivities. After Bonpensiero's murder, Bobby Baccalieri assumes the role of Santa Claus.

== See also ==
- Bada Bing!
