= Oksana Lada =

Ukrainian actress

- Оксана Лада
- Born: Ivano-Frankivsk, Ukrainian SSR, Soviet Union
- Other name: Oksana Babiy
- Occupations: Actress; model
- Years active: 1995–present
- Website: oksanalada.com

Oksana Lada (Ukrainian: Оксана Лада) is a Ukrainian actress, best known for the role of Irina Peltsin, the mistress of Tony Soprano, in the HBO series The Sopranos.

== Early life and education ==
Lada was born in Ivano-Frankivsk. At the age of 20, she studied economics and engineering in the Ivano-Frankivsk National Technical University of Oil and Gas and worked as a model before emigrating to the United States.

== Career ==
Lada appeared as Ulia in the Netflix series Orange Is the New Black. Lada gained recognition as the lead in an Off-Broadway revival of Pentecost, which was nominated for a Drama Desk Award in 2005. She also had a role as a wedding dress saleswoman in 30 Rock in the first episode of the show's second season, "SeinfeldVision".

After the 2017 inauguration of Donald Trump, Lada was a guest at the newly elected president's Inauguration Ball, one of two representatives from Hollywood along with Caitlyn Jenner.

== Filmography ==
=== Film ===
Year	Title	Role	Notes
2003	The Technical Writer	Nasty	
2009	Cold Souls	Sasha	
2012	Safe	Mamoschka's Hostess	
2018	The Big Take	Oxana	
2023	MobKing	Doctor Dana	
2024	Conundrum: Secrets among friends	Taylor	

=== Television ===
Year	Title	Role	Notes
1999–2002	The Sopranos	Irina Peltsin	13 episodes
1999, 2007	Law & Order	Woman / Second Natasha	2 episodes
2002	Hack	Katrina Nibs	Episode: "My Alibi"
2004	CSI: Miami	Nina Revay / Sandy	Episode: "Legal"
2007	30 Rock	Saleswoman	Episode: "SeinfeldVision"
2012	NYC 22	Letija Plancic	Episode: "Self Cleaning Oven"
2014	The Blacklist	Female Russian	Episode: "The Judge (No. 57)"
2014	Drop Dead Diva	Honey Pot Owner	2 episodes
2014	Orange Is the New Black	Ulya	Episode: "Low Self Esteem City"

=== Web ===
Year	TItle	Role	Notes
2021	Talking Sopranos	Self	Episode: "Rat Pack"
