= Michael Imperioli =

American actor (born 1966)

- Imperioli in 2025
- Born: March 26, 1966 (age 60); Mount Vernon, New York, U.S.
- Occupation: Actor
- Years active: 1985–present
- Spouse: Victoria Chlebowski (m. 1996)
- Children: 3

Michael Imperioli (Italian: [impeˈrjɔːli]; born March 26, 1966) is an American actor and musician. He is best known for his role as Christopher Moltisanti in the HBO crime drama series The Sopranos (1999–2007), which earned him the Primetime Emmy Award for Outstanding Supporting Actor in a Drama Series in 2004.

In the early part of his career, Imperioli played the role of Spider in Goodfellas (1990). He went on to play many supporting roles in films such as Jungle Fever (1991), Bad Boys (1995), The Basketball Diaries (1995), Shark Tale (2004), The Lovely Bones (2009), and most recently, One Night in Miami (2020) and Song Sung Blue (2025). He also co-wrote the screenplay for Summer of Sam (1999) with Spike Lee, and wrote five episodes of The Sopranos. He made his directorial feature film debut with The Hungry Ghosts (2008), which he also wrote.

For his role as Dominic Di Grasso in the second season of The White Lotus (2022), Imperioli was nominated again for the Primetime Emmy Award for Outstanding Supporting Actor in a Drama Series. On stage, he made his Broadway debut in the revival of the Henrik Ibsen play An Enemy of the People (2024).

He has played crime boss Dutch since July 2025 in the Fox crime drama Memory of a Killer.

== Early life and education ==
Imperioli was born on March 26, 1966, in Mount Vernon, New York. His father, Dominic Ralph Imperioli, was a bus driver and amateur actor, and his mother, Claire Linda (née Luzzi), was a department store worker and amateur actress. His ancestors immigrated to New York City from Lazio, Sicily, and Oriolo, Cosenza, Calabria in Italy.

At age 11, Imperioli and his family moved to Brewster, New York, and in high school he began watching Broadway plays. After graduating from Brewster High School in 1983, Imperioli planned on studying pre-med at the State University of New York at Albany. The night before he was set to begin college, he confided in his parents that he sought to be an actor. At age 17, Imperioli then moved to Manhattan's East Village, where he enrolled at Lee Strasberg Theatre and Film Institute to study acting. While there, he met John Ventimiglia, who later portrayed Artie Bucco on The Sopranos, and the two became roommates.

In the early 1990s, Imperioli performed as lead vocalist of the New Jersey-based jangle pop band Wild Carnation, departing to focus on his acting career prior to the release of their debut recordings in 1993.

== Career ==
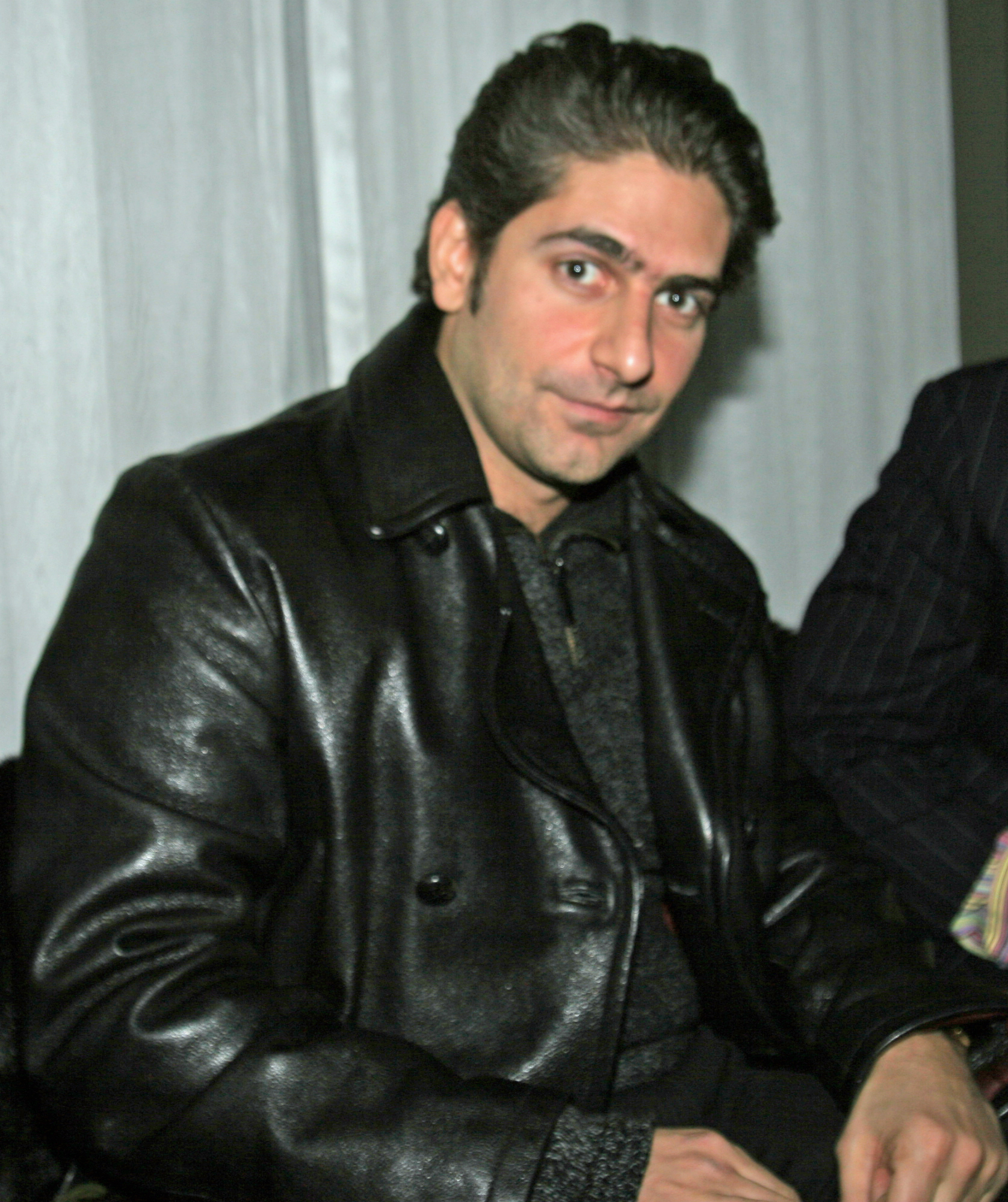
Imperioli in 2005

Imperioli has been nominated for two Golden Globe Awards and five Emmy Awards for his work as Christopher Moltisanti on The Sopranos. He won one Emmy for the fifth season of The Sopranos in 2004.

In addition to his role on The Sopranos, Imperioli has appeared in a number of films, including Goodfellas, Jungle Fever, Bad Boys, Malcolm X, The Basketball Diaries, Clockers, Dead Presidents, Girl 6, My Baby's Daddy, Lean on Me, I Shot Andy Warhol, Last Man Standing, Shark Tale, High Roller: The Stu Ungar Story, and Summer of Sam, which he also co-wrote and co-produced. He also wrote five episodes for The Sopranos.

Imperioli served as artistic director of Studio Dante, an Off-Broadway theater he formed with his wife. He is an active member of The Jazz Foundation of America and co-hosted their May 2009 annual benefit concert, "A Great Night in Harlem", at the Apollo Theater, which celebrated the foundation's 20th anniversary. He was a guest on the "San Giuseppe" episode of Mario Batali's Food Network television show Molto Mario. In 2010, Imperioli signed on to play the lead in the ABC television show Detroit 1-8-7. Working with the writer Gabriele Tinti, he wrote the text "Pride" for Tinti's book New York Shots, and participated in a reading of The Way of the Cross at the Queens Museum of Art in 2011.

Imperioli won the Tournament of Stars competition on the cooking show Chopped in 2014, sending $50,000 to his designated charity the Pureland Project, an organization which builds and maintains schools in rural Tibet. In 2016, he guest starred as the angel Uriel on the Fox show Lucifer.

On March 13, 2019, Imperioli was cast in the lead role of Rick Sellitto in the NBC drama series Lincoln Rhyme: Hunt for the Bone Collector. Imperioli co-hosts a podcast with Steve Schirripa titled Talking Sopranos, which began on April 6, 2020. The two provide inside info as they follow The Sopranos series episode by episode. By September 2020, the podcast had reached over five million downloads.

On September 17, 2020, Imperioli and Schirripa signed a deal with HarperCollins book imprint William Morrow and Company to write an oral history of the show; the book titled Woke Up This Morning: The Definitive Oral History of The Sopranos was released on November 2, 2021. In July 2020, he hosted a show on NTS Radio called 632 ELYSIAN FIELDS, which was inspired by A Streetcar Named Desire. In September 2020, Imperioli provided narration for The Whistleblower, a podcast about the 2007 NBA betting scandal. Imperioli is the guitarist and vocalist for the band Zopa. In 2020, Zopa released their debut album entitled La Dolce Vita. In 2021, Zopa headlined the Freakout Festival in Seattle.

Imperioli portrayed Andrew Cuomo in the Showtime limited series Escape at Dannemora (2018), Angelo Dundee in the Regina King directed One Night in Miami (2020), and served as narrator in the 2021 Sopranos prequel film, The Many Saints of Newark. In January 2022, Imperioli was cast in a lead role in the second season of the HBO dark comedy series The White Lotus. For his performance he received a nomination for a Primetime Emmy Award for Outstanding Supporting Actor in a Drama Series. In 2023 it was announced that Imperioli would make his Broadway debut in the 2024 Sam Gold-directed adaptation of the Henrik Ibsen play An Enemy of the People, acting alongside Jeremy Strong and Victoria Pedretti at the Circle in the Square Theatre. He acted in the Paul Schrader directed film Oh, Canada which premiered at the 2024 Cannes Film Festival.

Since July 2025 he has played Dutch, the friend and boss of hitman Angelo Doyle in Fox's crime drama Memory of a Killer.

== Personal life ==
Imperioli married Victoria Chlebowski in 1996. The couple have three children: two sons and Victoria's daughter from a previous relationship whom Michael adopted and raised as his own. They now primarily live in New York City with a home on the Upper West Side of Manhattan and had another home previously in Santa Barbara, California. He and his family are avid practitioners of Taekwondo. In 2008, Imperioli became a Buddhist.

Imperioli is a fan of the animated sitcom American Dad!. He has called it his favorite TV show in several interviews and has appeared in an episode voicing the character Roger's father Fred.

Imperioli is the lead singer and guitarist of the rock trio Zopa, which he formed in 2006 with drummer Olmo Tighe and bassist Elijah Amitin. Their most recent project, La Dolce Vita, released in 2020.

== Acting credits ==
=== Film ===
Year	Title	Role	Notes
1989	Alexa	Acid Head	
1989	Lean on Me	George	
1990	A Matter of Degrees	Zeno's Assistant	
1990	Goodfellas	Spider	
1991	Jungle Fever	James Tucci	
1992	Fathers & Sons	Johnny	
1992	Malcolm X	Reporter at Fire Bombing	
1992	Mac	Extra	
1993	Joey Breaker	Larry Metz	
1993	The Night We Never Met	Dry Cleaning Customer #1	
1993	Household Saints	Leonard Villanova	
1994	Touch Base	Bennie	Short film
1994	Men Lie		
1994	Hand Gun	Benny	
1994	Amateur	Doorman at Club	
1994	Post Cards from America	The Hustler	
1995	The Addiction	Missionary	
1995	The Basketball Diaries	Bobby	
1995	Bad Boys	Jojo	
1995	Sweet Nothing	Angelo	
1995	Clockers	Detective 'Jo-Jo'	
1995	Flirt	Michael	
1995	Dead Presidents	D'ambrosio	
1995	Trouble	Ellis	Short film
1996	Girls Town	Anthony	
1996	I Shot Andy Warhol	Ondine	
1996	Girl 6	Scary Caller #30	
1996	Trees Lounge	George	
1996	Last Man Standing	Giorgio Carmonte	
1996	Blixa Bargeld Stole My Cowboy Boots	Johnny	Short film
1997	Office Killer	Daniel Birch	
1997	The Deli	Matty	
1997	River Made to Drown In	Allen Hayden	
1998	Too Tired to Die	Fabrizio	
1999	On the Run	Albert DeSantis	
1999	Summer of Sam	Midnight	Also co-writer
2000	Auto Motives	Stud	Short film
2002	Love in the Time of Money	Will	
2003	High Roller: The Stu Ungar Story	Stu Ungar	
2004	My Baby's Daddy	Dominic	
2004	Shark Tale	Frankie	Voice
2007	The Inner Life of Martin Frost	Jim Fortunato	
2007	The Lovebirds	Vincent	
2008	Stóra Planið	Alexander	
2009	The Lovely Bones	Detective Len Fenerman	
2010	Love & Distrust	Stud	Direct-to-video
2011	Stuck Between Stations	David	
2013	The Call	Alan Denado	
2013	Vijay and I	Micky	
2013	Oldboy	Chucky	
2014	Foreclosure	Bill Landopolous	
2014	The Scribbler	Moss	
2014	The M Word	Charlie Moon	
2014	Cantinflas	Michael Todd	
2015	Houses		
2015	The Wannabe	Alphonse	
2018	Cabaret Maxime	Bennie Gazza	
2019	The Last Full Measure	Jay Ford	
2019	Primal	Paul Freed	
2020	One Night in Miami...	Angelo Dundee	
2021	The Many Saints of Newark	Christopher Moltisanti	Voice
2024	Oh, Canada	Malcolm	
2025	Song Sung Blue	Mark Shurilla	
2025	Between Wars	Sarge	
2026	The Housewife †	TBA	Completed
TBA	Rubber Hut †	TBA	Post-production
TBA	Empire City †	Mayor Holloway	Post-production
TBA	Stephanie, Bride to Be †		Filming

=== Television ===
Year	Title	Role	Notes
1994	NYPD Blue	Duane Rollins	Episode: "Dead and Gone"
1996	Law & Order	Johnny Stivers	Episode: "Atonement"
1997	New York Undercover	Miles Gordon	Episode: "The Last Hurrah"
1997	Firehouse	Lt. O'Connell	Television film
1998	Witness to the Mob	Louie Milito	Television film
1999–2007	The Sopranos	Christopher Moltisanti	Main cast; also wrote five episodes
2000	Disappearing Acts	Vinney	Television film
2000	Hamlet	Rosencrantz	Television film
2001	I Love the '90s	Himself	Episode: "I Love 1990"
2002	VH1 Big Awards	Himself/Host	Main host
2004	The Five People You Meet in Heaven	Captain	Television film
2005–2006	Law & Order	Detective Nick Falco	Recurring cast (season 15), guest (season 16)
2006	The Simpsons	Dante Jr. (voice)	Episode: "The Mook, the Chef, the Wife and Her Homer"
2007	For One More Day	Charley "Chick" Benetto	Television film
2008–2009	Life on Mars	Detective Ray Carling	Main cast
2010	Celebrity Ghost Stories	Himself	Episode #2.1
2010	Mercy	Harold Pindus	Episode: "We're All Adults"
2010	The Secret Life of the American Teenager	Dr. Ottavi	Episode: "The Sound of Silence"
2010–2011	Detroit 1-8-7	Detective Louis "Lou" Fitch	Main cast
2012	Girls	Powell Goldman	Episode: "Leave Me Alone"
2012	Necessary Roughness	Jimmy Folkes	Episode: "All the King's Horses"
2013	The Office	Sensei Billy	Episode: "Livin' the Dream"
2013	Nicky Deuce	The Doctor	Television film
2014	Rake	Alberto Rinaldi	Episode: "Bigamist"
2014	Californication	Rick Rath	Recurring cast (season 7)
2014	Chopped	Himself	2 episodes
2015–2016	Mad Dogs	Lex	Main cast
2015–2018	Hawaii Five-0	Odell Martin	Recurring cast (season 5), guest (season 6 & 8)
2016–2017	Lucifer	Uriel	Recurring cast (season 2)
2016–2021	Blue Bloods	Robert Lewis	Recurring cast (season 7), guest (season 11)
2017	Dice	Himself	Episode: "Fingerless"
2018	Alex, Inc.	Eddie	Main cast
2018	Escape at Dannemora	Andrew Cuomo	Episode: "Part 7"
2019	Watchmen	Video Testimonial Man	Episode: "Little Fear of Lightning"
2019–2020	Project Blue Book	Edward Rizzuto	Recurring cast (season 1), guest (season 2)
2020	Lincoln Rhyme: Hunt for the Bone Collector	Rick Sellitto	Main cast
2022	The White Lotus	Dominic Di Grasso	Main cast (season 2)
2022–2023	This Fool	Minister Leonard Payne	Recurring cast (season 1-2)
2024	American Dad!	Fred (voice)	Episode: "Piece by Piece"
2024	Wise Guy: David Chase and the Sopranos	Himself	Episode: "Part 1 & 2"
2024	Kite Man: Hell Yeah!	Joe / Moe Dubelz (voice)	Main role
2024	American Horror Stories	Daniel Hausman-Burger	Episode: "Backrooms"
2025	Krapopolis	Uncle Vince (voice)	Episode: "One Eye One Heart She's Stupe"
2025	The Dark Money Game	Neil Clark (voice)	Episode: "Ohio Confidential"
2026	Memory of a Killer	Dutch	Main role

=== Theater ===
Year	Title	Role	Venue	Ref.
2007	Chicken	Floyd	Studio Dante	
2024	An Enemy of the People	Peter Stockmann	Circle in the Square Theatre, Broadway	

=== Podcasts ===
Year	Title	Role	Notes
2020–2021, 2025	Talking Sopranos	Self (co-host)	92 episodes; Video podcast
2022	Marvel's Wastelanders: Black Widow	Stanley (voice)	10 episodes; Radio drama and podcast

== Awards and nominations ==
Year	Award	Category	Project	Result	Ref.
2001	Primetime Emmy Awards	Outstanding Supporting Actor in a Drama Series	The Sopranos (episodes: "Fortunate Son" and "Pine Barrens")	Nominated	
2003	Primetime Emmy Awards	Outstanding Supporting Actor in a Drama Series	The Sopranos (episodes: "The Strong, Silent Type" and "Whoever Did This")	Nominated	
2004	Primetime Emmy Awards	Outstanding Supporting Actor in a Drama Series	The Sopranos (episodes: "Irregular Around the Margins" and "Long Term Parking")	Won	
2006	Primetime Emmy Awards	Outstanding Supporting Actor in a Drama Series	The Sopranos (episodes: "Luxury Lounge" and "The Ride"	Nominated	
2007	Primetime Emmy Awards	Outstanding Supporting Actor in a Drama Series	The Sopranos (episode: "Walk Like a Man")	Nominated	
2023	Primetime Emmy Awards	Outstanding Supporting Actor in a Drama Series	The White Lotus (episode: "That's Amore")	Nominated	
2002	Golden Globe Awards	Best Supporting Actor – Television	The Sopranos (season 3)	Nominated	
2004	Golden Globe Awards	Best Supporting Actor – Television	The Sopranos (season 4)	Nominated	
1999	Actor Awards	Outstanding Ensemble in a Drama Series	The Sopranos (season 1)	Won	
2000	Actor Awards	Outstanding Ensemble in a Drama Series	The Sopranos (season 2)	Nominated	
2001	Actor Awards	Outstanding Ensemble in a Drama Series	The Sopranos (season 3)	Nominated	
2002	Actor Awards	Outstanding Ensemble in a Drama Series	The Sopranos (season 4)	Nominated	
2004	Actor Awards	Outstanding Ensemble in a Drama Series	The Sopranos (season 5)	Nominated	
2006	Actor Awards	Outstanding Ensemble in a Drama Series	The Sopranos (season 6, part 1)	Nominated	
2007	Actor Awards	Outstanding Ensemble in a Drama Series	The Sopranos (season 6, part 2)	Won	
2020	Actor Awards	Outstanding Cast in a Motion Picture	One Night in Miami	Nominated	
2022	Actor Awards	Outstanding Ensemble in a Drama Series	The White Lotus (season 2)	Won	
2003	PRISM Awards	Best Performance in a Drama Series	The Sopranos	Nominated	
2008	Monte-Carlo Television Festival	Outstanding Actor in a Drama Series	The Sopranos	Nominated	
2009	International Film Festival Rotterdam	Tiger Award	The Hungry Ghosts	Nominated	
