= Christopher Moltisanti =

Fictional character on the TV series The Sopranos

- The Sopranos character
- Michael Imperioli as Christopher Moltisanti
- First appearance: "The Sopranos" (1999)
- Last appearance: The Many Saints of Newark (2021)
- Created by: David Chase
- Portrayed by: Michael Imperioli

In-universe information
- Aliases: Chris Maccaviti (episode 2.05); Chris Montevani (episode 5.11); Chrissy
- Gender: Male
- Title(s): Associate (seasons 1–3); Soldier (seasons 3–5); Acting Captain (season 4); Captain (seasons 6a–6b)
- Occupation: Union safety official; stock market chief compliance officer; film screenwriter/producer; nightclub owner; mobster
- Family: Joanne Moltisanti (mother); Richard "Dickie" Moltisanti (father); Aldo "Hollywood Dick" Moltisanti (grandfather); Salvatore "Sally" Moltisanti (granduncle); Carmela Soprano (first cousin once removed); Tony Blundetto (cousin); Gregory Moltisanti (cousin); Constance Blundetto (cousin); Jason Moltisanti (cousin)
- Spouses: Kelli Lombardo Moltisanti (wife); Adriana La Cerva (late fiancee); Amy Safir (brief fling); Julianna Skiff (mistress)
- Children: Caitlin Lombardo Moltisanti (daughter)
- Relatives: Tony Soprano (cousin-in-law); Janice Soprano (cousin); Barbara Soprano Giglione (cousin); Al Blundetto (uncle); Pat Blundetto (uncle); Meadow Soprano (second cousin); A.J. Soprano (second cousin); Hugh DeAngelis (great uncle); Salvatore "Sally" Moltisanti (Uncle)
- Nationality: Italian-American
- Status: Deceased

Christopher Moltisanti, portrayed by Michael Imperioli, is a fictional character of the HBO television series The Sopranos. He is Tony Soprano's protégé and a member of the DiMeo crime family, rising from associate to captain over the course of the series.

In the television series, Tony Soprano has been a father figure to Christopher since the death of his father, Dickie Moltisanti. Tony affectionately refers to Christopher as his "nephew," but he is actually a first cousin once removed of Tony's wife Carmela (Carmela's father Hugh and Chris's paternal grandmother Lena were brother and sister). Tony and Christopher knew each other before Tony met Carmela because their fathers were both involved in the Mafia and because they are both cousins, through unrelated sides, to Tony Blundetto; Christopher's girlfriend Adriana La Cerva also believes that Tony and Christopher are distantly related through Christopher's mother.

Christopher is a volatile, impulsive, and unpredictable young man, frustrated by his perceived lack of progress in the Mafia business. His violent behavior often causes friction between him and the rest of the North Jersey Mafia, which is especially troublesome for Tony Soprano, who attempts to guide Christopher towards becoming a major leader in the business. Throughout the series, Christopher struggles with substance abuse, which further complicates his relationship with the Mafia, especially when other Mafia members ostracize Christopher when he attempts to stay sober.

In Season 1, Christopher oversteps his authority when he hijacks trucks under the protection of captain Junior Soprano. To teach him a lesson, Junior orders his mock execution. In the second season, Chris is shot by his subordinates Matthew Bevilaqua and Sean Gismonte but survives. Defending himself, he kills Gismonte, but Bevilaqua escapes by running. Bevilaqua is found at a park by Richie Aprile confidantes and is killed by Tony Soprano and Salvatore "Big Pussy" Bonpensiero. Chris is hospitalized but recovers. Tony trusts Christopher with sensitive tasks, such as disposing of the bodies of murdered captains Richie Aprile and Ralph Cifaretto and arranging the assassination of New York boss Carmine Lupertazzi. In the third season, Chris finally becomes a made man. This leads to friction with Paulie Gualtieri, culminating in the Pine Barrens incident and although they make an uneasy truce, they clash again on several occasions. By the sixth season, Christopher is promoted to the role of captain, and Tony tells him that he will lead the family into the 21st century.

Christopher's character has a tumultuous and abusive relationship with Adriana, his long-term girlfriend, who becomes his fiancée. When Chris becomes enraged about rumors that Adriana and Tony are having an affair, he pulls a gun on Tony, who is ready to kill him for doing so. He is spared only after Tony Blundetto intercedes for him. In the fifth season, Chris learns that Adriana has been working as an informant for the U.S. Federal Bureau of Investigation and that she wants him to go into the Witness Protection Program with her. Valuing loyalty over love, Christopher reports Adriana's actions to Tony, who has Silvio Dante kill her. Christopher then marries his new girlfriend, Kelli Lombardo, and they have a daughter, Caitlyn. But his interest in his new wife soon wanes. He grows disillusioned with Tony and frustrated with his progress in the DiMeo crime family, and distances himself from the business by making a film and trying to become a Hollywood screenwriter. While the movie is a modest success, Chris grows irritated with his business partner J.T. Dolan and eventually ends up murdering him when Dolan refuses to listen to details of the murders he had witnessed previously.

Because of his substance abuse, Christopher spends significant amounts of time at AA meetings and rehabilitation centers. Despite wanting Christopher to succeed, Tony doubts his "nephew's" loyalty and suitability to be his successor, and he fears that Christopher's immaturity and frequent drug problems make him a ripe target to turn state's evidence. Christopher's efforts to stay clean of drugs and alcohol cause him to spend less time at their regular haunts, further arousing Tony's suspicions. Christopher causes a car crash as he is driving Tony home while high. After seeing that Caitlyn's baby seat has been completely destroyed in the accident and knowing she would have been killed if she were in the car, Tony has finally had enough and suffocates the badly injured Chris, finally ridding himself of his troublesome "nephew".

== Biography ==
Christopher Moltisanti was born in 1969 to Richard "Dickie" Moltisanti, a soldier in the DiMeo crime family, and Joanne Blundetto. In the episode "Cold Cuts" it is revealed that Chris grew up in the Rochelle Park section of Paramus, New Jersey next to the Westfield Garden State Plaza. When talking about his childhood with his cousin Tony Blundetto he describes himself as an urban youth, something Blundetto disagrees with.

When discussing making a biographical movie of Joe Gallo with Jon Favreau, Moltisanti mentions that he vaguely remembered Gallo being murdered in 1972, as he was only a kid (3 years old). Dickie is killed by a hitman sent by Junior Soprano when Chris is very young (although Junior kept his involvement hidden and the murder is blamed on another mobster named Jilly Ruffalo). Tony Soprano affectionately considers Christopher a "nephew," and looks out for him over the years. He is a fan of the television show Cops. Moltisanti is a roommate of Brendan Filone before his murder and engaged to Adriana La Cerva before her murder. Chris is a cousin once removed of Tony's wife Carmela, making him a second cousin to her children.

=== Season 1 ===
Christopher begins the series as Tony's driver and enforcer and is eager to rise through the ranks in the Mafia. He "makes his bones" by killing Emil Kolar in order to settle a dispute with the DiMeo crime family over the Triborough Towers garbage routes. He initially plans to place the body in a Kolar Bros. dumpster to send a warning, but Salvatore "Big Pussy" Bonpensiero convinces him to put it elsewhere so that it would bring less heat to the crew. The murder haunts Chris's dreams, and he twice has to dig up and move Kolar's corpse.

Chris aids Brendan in hijacking Comley trucks, which are under Junior Soprano's protection. The two are ordered to pay $15,000 in restitution to Junior and leave the trucks alone. Chris and Brendan plan another heist while high on methamphetamine, but Chris backs down at the last minute out of loyalty to Tony. Brendan and two others go through with the heist, which ends in the accidental death of the driver.

Chris is reprimanded by Tony for not using his leadership to stop Brendan. Junior, angered that his authority was flouted, stages a mock execution for Chris in the New Jersey Meadowlands. Brendan is shot in the eye by Mikey Palmice. Christopher later avenges Brendan's death as part of Tony's revenge against Junior, when he and Paulie ambush and murder Mikey out in the woods.

=== Season 2 ===
Chris is put in charge of the family's pump and dump scam, with Matthew Bevilaqua and Sean Gismonte serving as his subordinates. Eventually, Bevilaqua and Gismonte decide to murder him to gain favor with Richie Aprile. The pair ambush Chris outside a diner and badly wound him, but he manages to kill Gismonte as Bevilaqua flees the scene. When Chris recovers from a coma, his spleen is removed and goes through a traumatic recovery process, having been clinically dead for about a minute.

Bevilaqua is eventually tracked down and executed by Tony and Big Pussy. Chris tells the crew that during his coma, he had seen himself in either hell or purgatory and warned them that Brendan and Mikey told him that three o'clock would be a significant time in their future.

Shortly before the shooting, Chris and Adriana had gotten into a fight causing Adriana to move in with her mother. Chris gets her back by proposing to her, against her mother's advice. Despite this, the two don't get married.

Following Richie's death at the hands of Janice, Tony calls Chris and Furio Giunta to dispose of his body. They use Satriale's bandsaw and processing room to dismember the corpse. At Meadow Soprano's graduation, Tony proposes to let Chris be made.

=== Season 3 ===
During Chris's initiation ceremony, in "Fortunate Son", he notices a raven on the windowsill and takes this as a bad omen. As the family's newest member, he inherits a betting shop from his capo, Paulie Gualtieri and is charged with paying minimum weekly dues to him. There is friction when Chris has difficulty making payments to Paulie, who subsequently humiliates him. After the Pine Barrens incident, they agreed to bury the hatchet. Elsewhere, Chris opens the Crazy Horse Nightclub in Long Branch with Furio as a partner and Adriana as the front operator.

Chris is present when Jackie Aprile Jr. and his friends try to rob a card game run by Eugene Pontecorvo. Chris and acting capo Albert Barese fire back, killing Jackie Jr.'s friend Dino Zerilli as he tries to escape. Chris, jealous and resentful of Jackie Jr. as a rival for Tony's favor, expresses his intent to kill Jackie Jr. as retaliation for the heist, which Tony denies. This causes Chris to question Tony's leadership, calling him a hypocrite for not enforcing established rules of the mob protecting made men, which enrages Tony.

Eventually, Vito Spatafore carries out a contract killing on Jackie Jr. in the Boonton Projects, shooting him in the back of the head, on the orders of Ralph Cifaretto and Tony. At Jackie Jr.'s funeral, Chris is arrested on a gambling charge along with Patsy Parisi and Silvio Dante.

=== Season 4 ===
To protect himself from prosecution, Tony makes Chris the main contact in criminal dealings. He then bonds his nephew to him by having him murder the recently retired Lieutenant Detective Barry Haydu, after telling Chris that Haydu had murdered his father. Christopher confronts Haydu at his home and Haydu denies having heard of Dickie Moltisanti and claimed that someone was "obviously" setting him up. However, he inadvertently admitted knowing Dickie Moltisanti by stating "Look, whoever told you I had anything to do with his death is lying!", before Christopher ever mentioned Dickie's death, whom Haydu supposedly did not even know.

Haydu's last words before he is killed by Christopher are "I'm sorry!" indicating that he was likely responsible. In "No Show", Chris is made acting capo of Paulie's crew while Paulie is imprisoned on a gun charge, being awarded a no-show job at the Esplanade construction site. His promotion irks Patsy, who has seniority. The two come to blows over Patsy's continued theft from the construction site, despite orders from Tony. Silvio was actually the guiding force behind Patsy's actions, as he was also jealous of Chris's promotion.

Chris's drug use spirals out of control following his temporary promotion. When Tony calls upon him to dispose of Ralph Cifaretto's body, he realizes that Chris is high on heroin. Although they successfully hide the body, Tony decides his nephew needs help. Later, Chris is carjacked by a Puerto Rican gang while trying to buy heroin. When Chris physically abuses Adriana, Tony organizes an intervention. However, the meeting ends badly when it is revealed that Chris had accidentally killed Adriana's dog by sitting on it when high. Tony, whose beloved racehorse was killed in a fire, possibly set by Ralph, becomes very angry. He insists Chris go into rehab and assigns Patsy to guard him.

Following Chris's successful rehabilitation, Tony entrusts him with the planned hit on Carmine Lupertazzi; Chris contracts the job out to Credenzo Curtis and Stanley Johnson, Black gang members and drug dealers who he had known from his period of heroin abuse. When the job is called off and Tony urges him to make sure it can't be traced to them, Chris has Benny Fazio and Peter "Bissell" LaRosa shoot Curtis and Johnson to death while he waits in his car watching over the hit. Fazio and La Rosa steal back the money Chris had given Curtis and Johnson, which they believed was payment for the hit they were tasked with.

=== Season 5 ===
Chris and Paulie are put in charge of a cigarette smuggling operation. While Chris is traveling to North Carolina to pick up cigarettes, Tony and Adriana are involved in a car accident. Rumors begin to spread that the crash was caused by Adriana performing oral sex on Tony. Chris finds out, gets drunk, starts a fight with Vito, and pulls a gun on Tony in the Bada Bing. Tony is prepared to kill Chris, but their cousin Tony Blundetto steps in and saves his life. Tony B. arranges a meeting with the doctor who treated Tony and Adriana, who explains that both passengers were upright and had their seat belts fastened when it occurred. Chris reconciles with Vito and Tony.

Chris later travels to his uncle Pat Blundetto's farm alongside Tony and Tony B. They help Pat move bodies hidden on the farm as Pat is planning to move away. While there, Chris recalls being bullied by the two Tonys, and they exhibit such behavior by ribbing him over his addiction problems.

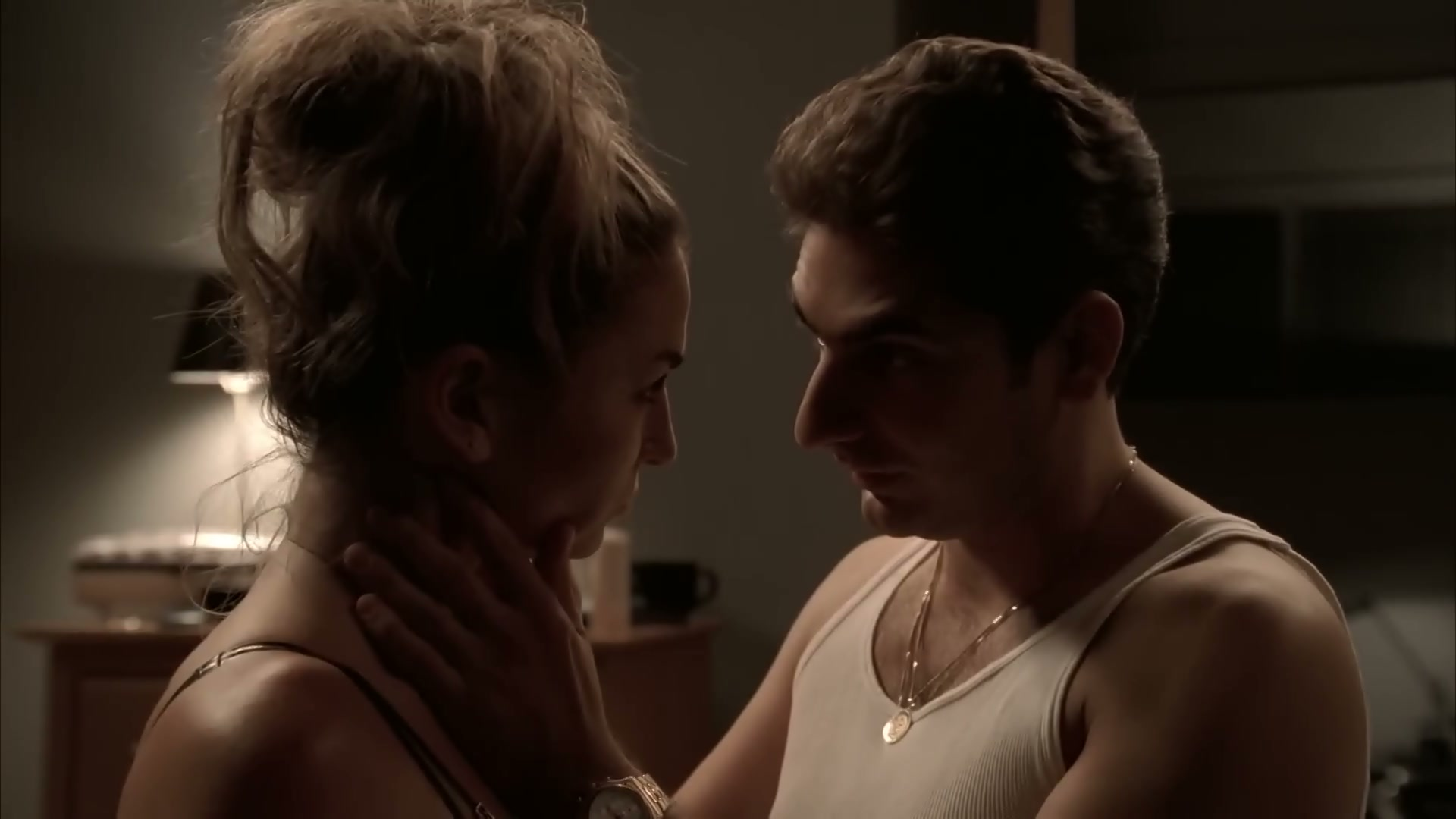
Christopher with Adriana La Cerva

Throughout this time, Chris maintains a turbulent and very violent relationship with Adriana. He indulged her aspirations for a career in music by allowing her to produce a demo and later giving her a club to run. They became engaged before he is sent to rehab. However, after he learns that Adriana has reluctantly provided information to the FBI, he turns to Tony rather than accept her plea to join her in witness protection. Tony sends Silvio Dante to meet with Adriana, purportedly to drive to the hospital to visit Chris, but in reality, he executes her in the woods. Chris relapses into heroin use and weeps to Tony out of grief for Adriana. Tony disgusted at this beats him up.

=== Season 6 ===
==== Part I ====
Chris is promoted to capo, in keeping with Tony's long-term plan to raise his nephew through the ranks until he eventually is appointed boss. He uses Chris to organize a sensitive hit on Rusty Millio. Chris initially questions Tony's decision to contract the job out to their friends in Naples, but later decides it was a smart move. He uses his Italian-speaking associate Corky Caporale to communicate with hitmen and provide them with weapons and instructions while paying him off with heroin. Chris's readiness for the responsibility of leading his own crew is unclear as he is distracted by a potential career in Hollywood, relapses into drug use, and displays unresolved feelings over his murdered fiancée.

Chris's crew gets involved in a credit card fraud scam; his AA sponsor James "Murmur" Zancone and Benny Fazio take numbers from local businesses and sell them on to associates Ahmed and Muhammad. He wonders about whether these men have links to terrorism. The use of numbers from Nuovo Vesuvio (Note: Nuovo Vesuvio is a restaurant from The Sopranos: explained at multiple Wikipedia articles, including List of The Sopranos characters.) leads to a violent dispute between Benny and Tony's friend Artie Bucco. Tony blames Chris's trip to Los Angeles for the dispute not being settled quickly.

Chris marries Kelli Lombardo after learning that she is pregnant with his child. He has a belated bachelor party with the Soprano crime family at Nuovo Vesuvio, where "Larry Boy" Barese makes a toast to his future. However, when he later delivers Corky's final payment, including more heroin, he cannot resist when he watches his friend inject the drug. He spends the night at the Feast of St. Elzear festival with a stray dog.

Chris takes a road trip to Pennsylvania with Tony just before the feast. On their way home, they spot some bikers robbing a strip mall and take part of the haul for themselves. This leads to a firefight in which Chris shoots one of the bikers as Tony drives away. Later, the two get drunk on the wine they had stolen, and Chris recalls telling Tony of Adriana's treachery. The two express their love for and loyalty to each other, though when the two later try to recreate their camaraderie sober, it falls flat and ends in awkward silence. Months later, Chris is back in AA meetings.

==== Part II ====
Chris premieres his film Cleaver at a private screening with other Soprano associates, looking to have it distributed nationwide. He also tries to distance himself from alcohol and stays away from the Bada Bing. When Tony begins grooming Bobby Bacala for the position Chris once held, it is clear that their relationship has cooled. Given Chris's resentment towards Tony about Adriana's death, and his continued desire to enter the film business, the two continue to drift apart.

When he relapses to drinking after yet another confrontation with Paulie, he becomes very angry with the crew and leaves. He later ends up at his "friend" J.T. Dolan's home, looking for someone to talk to. When J.T. makes explicit mention of Chris's membership in the Mafia and refuses to let Chris talk out his problems that night, Chris shoots him in the head and leaves.

As Tony and Chris drive back from a meeting with Phil Leotardo and the New York crew, Chris – clearly impaired by drugs and alcohol – crashes his Cadillac Escalade after veering onto the wrong side of the road. Tony climbs out of the SUV, but Chris is badly injured and coughing up blood. He pleads for Tony's help, mumbling that he wouldn't pass a drug test and could lose his license. Tony sees a tree branch impaling a car seat where Christopher's daughter could have been sitting. He pinches Christopher's nostrils shut, causing him to choke to death on his own blood.

Throughout the episode's remainder, Tony displays the proper decorum for the family in mourning yet can barely restrain his relief that he is finally free of the burden Chris has placed upon him for so long – his insubordination, his substance abuse, his reckless behavior, and his complaints. He describes Chris as a "drag" on his emotions, and "a weak, lying drug addict". In a dream, Tony admits to Dr. Melfi that he murdered Chris, as well as other friends and associates, naming specifically his cousin Tony Blundetto and best friend Big Pussy. In the series's final episodes, Chris's picture is hung in the pork store in his honor; Paulie is disturbed that the resident cat spends its days staring at the picture.

=== Clandestine knowledge ===
Because of his close relationship with Tony Soprano, Christopher is the only other one who knows which bodies were buried at "Uncle Pat" Blundetto's farm and what really happened to Ralph Cifaretto. Chris is also one of the few to know Richie Aprile was murdered by Janice Soprano, Tony Soprano's murder of Fabian Petrulio, the aborted plan to hit New York boss Carmine Lupertazzi and about Silvio's murder of Christopher's fiancée, Adriana La Cerva.

=== The Many Saints of Newark ===
Imperioli returns in the prequel film The Many Saints of Newark. Though never seen on screen, he acts as the narrator of the film. Christopher is seemingly narrating from the afterlife, bitterly referencing his death at the hands of Tony as well as Tony's lack of financial support to his family after his death. During the film, an infant Christopher cries when he sees Tony at a welcoming back party for Tony's father, "Johnny Boy" Soprano. When Tony expresses confusion at the infant Chris's behavior around him, a woman at the table tells him that "some babies, when they come into the world, know all kinds of things from the other side." The final scene of the film ends with Tony standing over the open coffin of Dickie Moltisanti, with Christopher narrating that Tony is "the guy [he] went to hell for."

== Killings or possible killings committed or assisted by Christopher ==
Victim
| Victim | Year | Reason | Episode |
|---|---|---|---|
| Emil Kolar | 1998 | Shot in the head by Chris due to a dispute between Barone Sanitation (Tony's company) and Kolar Bros. Sanitation over waste management contracts, in the backroom of Satriale's Pork Store. | "Pilot"* |
| Michael "Mikey" Palmice | 1999 | Shot in the chest by Chris and Paulie for conspiring to kill Tony with Junior and for killing Brendan Filone, Christopher's friend. | "I Dream of Jeannie Cusamano" |
| Sean Gismonte | 2000 | Shot and killed by Chris in self-defense after he and associate Matthew Bevilaqua attempted to kill him. | "Full Leather Jacket" |
| Carlo Renzi | 2001 | Shot in the head and killed by Chris in self-defense during poker game robbery. | "Amour Fou" |
| Dino Zerilli | 2001 | Shot and killed by Chris and Albert Barese after Zerilli and Jackie Jr. shot and killed Sunshine and wounded Furio Giunta during a poker-game robbery. | "Amour Fou" |
| Barry Haydu | 2002 | Executed in his home by Chris after Tony informed Chris that Haydu was the man who was contracted by Jilly Rufalo many years ago to kill Chris's father. | "For All Debts Public and Private" |
| J.T. Dolan | 2007 | Shot in the head by Christopher. | "Walk Like a Man" |

Christopher has helped dispose of several people murdered by other people throughout the series, mainly Tony.

Victim
| Victim | Year | Reason | Episode |
|---|---|---|---|
| James "Jimmy" Altieri | 1999 | Lured by Christopher to his death, a bullet to the back of the head courtesy of Silvio Dante. Christopher helped Silvio get rid of the corpse. | "I Dream of Jeannie Cusamano"* |
| Richie Aprile | 1999 | Bagged up, carried off, and cut up in the basement of Satriale's as requested by Tony after he was shot and killed by Janice for hitting her. | "The Knight in White Satin Armor" |
| Tracee | 2000 | Silvio told Christopher to "get a sheet" from inside the strip club to cover up her corpse. | "University" |
| Valery (Possible) | 2001 | Possibly alive, he was shot in the head by Paulie in the woods when Chris and Paulie were chasing him. | "Pine Barrens" |
| Ralph Cifaretto | 2003 | Decapitation and removal of hands with a cleaver. Head and hands placed in a bowling bag by Christopher, who subsequently helped Tony dispose of the bag and Ralph's body. Ralph had been beaten and choked to death by Tony. | "Whoever Did This" |
| Credenzo Curtis and Stanley Johnson | 2003 | Tony gave Chris the responsibility of hiring a couple of assassins to take out New York boss Carmine Lupertazzi Sr. at the request of Johnny Sack. He chooses Curtis and Johnson, two African Americans from Irvington who he believes would be good at making it look like a carjacking. When Tony comes to an agreement with Carmine and calls off the hit, Chris is given the new task of eliminating the two hired hands. He meets with the hitmen in a parking lot and gives them the money for the hit that never happened. Benny Fazio and Petey LaRosa surprise the two hitmen when they suddenly appear and shoot and kill them in their car. | "Whitecaps" |
| Raoul | 2004 | Christopher threw a brick at him and then Paulie shot him. | "Two Tonys" |
| Jack Massarone | 2004 | Christopher volunteered to do the hit on Massarone after Tony suspected "Black Jack" of wearing a wire under his hat. It is unclear who murdered Massarone later in the episode, but there is strong evidence that Moltisanti was directly responsible for it. | "Rat Pack" |
| Adriana La Cerva | 2004 | Once she confessed to Christopher that she had been an FBI informant, divulging important information about the DiMeo crime family, Chris's loyalty to Tony proved to be greater than his love for Adriana. While he did not directly participate in the hit (it was carried out by Silvio Dante), Chris did park Adriana's car (after disposing of a suitcase that he had stuffed with her belongings and clothes) at an airport's "Long Term Parking" lot in an attempt to make it look like she had fled. | "Long Term Parking" |
| Teddy Spirodakis | 2006 | Chris asked Eugene Pontecorvo to do him the favor of going to kill Spirodakis in exchange for Chris's putting in a good word to Tony for Eugene's retirement from the Family. | "Members Only" |
| Rusty Millio | 2006 | Organized the discreet hit on orders from Tony via Neapolitan Camorra hitmen as a favor to Johnny Sack. | "Luxury Lounge" |

== References to Imperioli's career ==
- In the episode "46 Long", Christopher and Brendan Filone encounter Martin Scorsese (portrayed by a lookalike) outside of a club. Christopher yells "Marty! Kundun! I liked it!". Imperioli acted in Scorsese's gangster film Goodfellas in a minor role, "Spider".
- In Season 1 Moltisanti shoots a bakery clerk in the foot in retaliation for a perceived lack of respect and service. This is a nod to Imperioli's Goodfellas character Spider, shot in the foot for the same reason. When the bakery clerk was yelling in pain about his foot being shot, Christopher replies "It happens!"
- In reference to his Goodfellas character, Spider, being shot and killed by Joe Pesci's character, Tommy DeVito. In the season 2 episode, "Big Girls Don't Cry", when Christopher gets his confidence up as a student actor, Adriana tells him "I like you as an actor." and Christopher replies "Joe Pesci or so.", he then does a Joe Pesci impression of him saying a line in Jimmy Hollywood.
- In the episode "Live Free or Die", after it is confirmed that Vito Spatafore is gay, Christopher states "I wanna kill the fat faggot myself, it'd be a fucking honor. Cut off his pisciatil' and feed it to him." This is a reference to Imperioli's character D'Ambrosio in the film Dead Presidents having exactly the same thing done to him by the North Vietnamese. Pisciatil' is slang connotation for penis.
- When Imperioli auditioned for the role of Christopher, he thought that series creator David Chase was unimpressed with his audition and was surprised when he was offered the part.

== Reception ==
Both Christopher's character development and Michael Imperioli's performance have received universal acclaim. He received several accolades, including a Primetime Emmy Award for Outstanding Supporting Actor in a Drama Series in 2004. He was nominated four other times for the award and he also received two Golden Globe nominations in 2002 and 2004. TV Guide rated him #13 on their list of "TV's Top 100 Characters".
