= Cold Cuts (The Sopranos) =

- The Sopranos episode
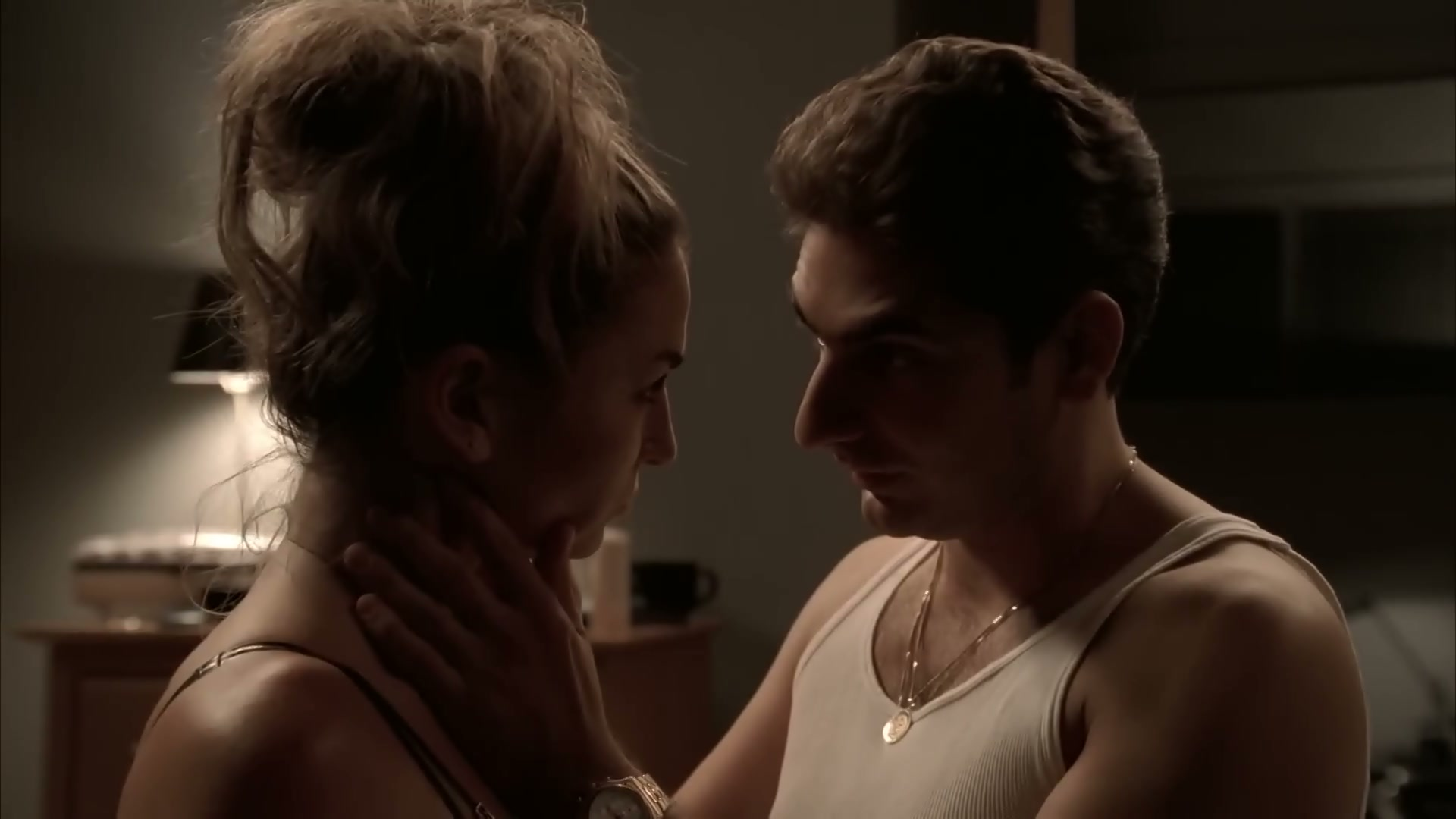
- Adriana La Cerva asking Christopher Moltisanti to move away and start over
- Episode no.: Season 5 Episode 10
- Directed by: Mike Figgis
- Written by: Robin Green; Mitchell Burgess
- Cinematography by: Alik Sakharov
- Production code: 510
- Original air date: May 9, 2004
- Running time: 53 minutes

Episode chronology
← Previous "Unidentified Black Males"	Next → "The Test Dream"
- The Sopranos season 5

"Cold Cuts" is the 62nd episode of the HBO original series The Sopranos and the 10th of the show's fifth season. Written by Robin Green and Mitchell Burgess, and directed by Mike Figgis, it originally aired on May 9, 2004.

== Starring ==
- James Gandolfini as Tony Soprano
- Lorraine Bracco as Dr. Jennifer Melfi
- Edie Falco as Carmela Soprano
- Michael Imperioli as Christopher Moltisanti
- Dominic Chianese as Corrado Soprano, Jr. *
- Steven Van Zandt as Silvio Dante
- Tony Sirico as Paulie Gualtieri
- Robert Iler as Anthony Soprano, Jr. *
- Jamie-Lynn DiScala as Meadow Soprano *
- Drea de Matteo as Adriana La Cerva
- Aida Turturro as Janice Soprano Baccalieri
- Steven R. Schirripa as Bobby Baccalieri
- Vincent Curatola as Johnny Sack
- and Steve Buscemi as Tony Blundetto

* = credit only

=== Guest starring ===
- Frank Albanese as Uncle Pat Blundetto
- Sharon Angela as Rosalie Aprile
- Chris Caldovino as Billy Leotardo
- Max Casella as Benny Fazio
- Joseph R. Gannascoli as Vito Spatafore
- Dan Grimaldi as Patsy Parisi
- Arthur Nascarella as Carlo Gervasi
- Frank Santorelli as Georgie Santorelli
- David Strathairn as Robert Wegler
- Frank Vincent as Phil Leotardo
- Miryam Coppersmith as Sophia Baccalieri
- Angelo Massagli as Bobby Baccalieri III
- Chandra Wilson as Evelyn Greenwood
- Ron Castellano as Terry Doria
- Judy DelGiudice as Louise Blundetto
- Remy Auberjonois as Dr. Phillip Seepman
- Angelo Di Mascio Jr. as Security Guard
- Gino Cafarelli as Vinny Pitts
- Christian Corp as Janet Petit
- Dawn Evans as Cheryl Kolpeki
- Adam Grupper as Bela Kakuk
- Jennifer Rainville as Gillian Glessner
- Andrew Siff as News Anchor

== Synopsis ==
Tony and Johnny meet about a missing load of smuggled Vespa scooters that were supposed to be received by Carlo Gervasi's crew and split between the two families. Johnny denies any knowledge of the Vespas and makes a pointed reference to Tony's continued denial that Tony B was involved in the hit on Joey Peeps. Tony suspects Johnny seized the shipment for himself and sends Benny and a member of Carlo's crew to the Port of Newark to investigate. They brutally interrogate a security guard, who tells them that Phil took the scooters. A shipment of expensive Italian cheeses is coming in; fearing more financial losses, Tony loses his temper in front of his crew.

Tony asks Tony B and Christopher to remove three bodies from Uncle Pat Blundetto's farm in Kinderhook, New York, which is about to be sold and demolished. Chris complains to Adriana about the two Tonys' past treatment of him. Adriana suggests they leave New Jersey and start over elsewhere, but Chris replies that he is a soldier for life. Despite early tensions, Chris and Tony B bond as they gradually dispose of the bodies. However, when Tony comes to oversee the completion of the job, the two older men fall back into their routine of picking on Chris, with Tony making fun of his sobriety. Chris passes up an opportunity to go hunting with them and leaves the farm early the next morning, driving home in tears.

Tony returns to the Bada Bing and, prompted by a TV program he has seen, talks about terrorist threats tied to unexamined cargo containers at the ports. When Georgie Santorelli responds by saying, "That's why you gotta live for today," Tony suddenly explodes in fury and gives him a beating that sends him to the hospital and causes permanent hearing loss. Afterward, a remorseful Tony gives Paulie a wad of bills and insists that he make sure Georgie receives the best care. Paulie then tells Tony that Georgie is quitting his job at the Bing and doesn't want to see him again.

Carmela continues to be hostile towards Tony and drains the water from their pool to keep him from swimming there. After another fight, they agree to organize an engagement party for Meadow and Finn. When she runs into Mr. Wegler at A.J.'s school, she surprises herself by saying that she is moving back in with her husband, but later insists to Rosalie that she has no such intention.

Janice is arrested after assaulting another mother at her stepdaughter's soccer game. Tony is infuriated over the publicity brought to his family and storms into Janice's house late at night, demanding she plead guilty to the charges and that Bobby "take control" of his wife. Citing her recent bellicose behavior, Bobby gives Janice an ultimatum to either see an anger management specialist or end their marriage. Janice starts attending anger management classes and tells Tony that they have helped her make tremendous progress; Tony says he is happy for her. The "Soprano temper" becomes the focus of Tony's next session with Dr. Melfi, who observes that both depression and anger are related, stating that "depression is rage turned inward."

Tony joins Janice and Bobby for dinner but becomes irritated when he sees his newly placid sister deal calmly with a series of minor annoyances. He breaks the calm by provoking her with sarcastic and increasingly hurtful comments about her estranged son, Harpo. Janice soon gets enraged and chases Tony round the room with a fork in her fist. Smiling to himself, he leaves.

== First appearances ==
- Uncle Pat Blundetto: Tony S and Tony B's uncle who was given early retirement from the DiMeo crime family because of health issues. He settled on a large farm in Kinderhook, New York, where he was often visited by his nephews Christopher, Tony S, and Tony B during their childhoods.

== Title reference ==
- Tony tells Dr. Melfi that "revenge is like serving cold cuts" (inadvertently mangling the adage "Revenge is a dish best served cold"). In the episode, Johnny Sack continues to interfere with Soprano business in retribution for the murder of "Joey Peeps."
- In a scene at Uncle Pat's farm, Christopher, Pat, and Tony B eat cold-cut sandwiches for lunch.
- The title may also refer to the dead bodies Tony B and Christopher are looking for in this episode.

== Connections to previous episodes ==
- Christopher and Tony Blundetto dig up and dispose of Emil Kolar's skeleton, moving his body for the second time. Christopher shot and killed Emil in the Pilot episode. Then, he and Pussy Bonpensiero unsuccessfully tried to put Emil's body into a dumpster. Later, they buried the body under a bridge somewhere. But the burial was giving Christopher nightmares. So, Christopher and Georgie later dug up the body and relocated it in "The Legend of Tennessee Moltisanti".
- When Tony confronts Janice over the assault, she tells him that the woman is lucky she didn't kill her. Tony responds, "Well, we know that." This refers to the killing of Richie Aprile by Janice in "The Knight in White Satin Armor".
- The woman Tony sleeps with was previously encountered in "Irregular Around the Margins" as an employee of the dermatologist's office where his cancerous mole was removed.
- Tony previously assaulted Georgie in Season 1, Episode 2: "46 Long". Exasperated by Georgie's clumsy way of handling a phone call, Tony took the phone and bashed him on the head with it.

== Other cultural references ==
- Of Johnny Sack's belief that Tony Blundetto killed "Joey Peeps," Silvio comments that Sack should be "out looking for the real killers, instead of spending all his time on the golf course." This line is a not-so-subtle jab at O. J. Simpson, who in the years after his acquittal on murder charges claimed to be seeking "the real killers" while he was often criticized for spending much of his free time playing golf.
- Dr. Melfi quotes W. B. Yeats' "The Second Coming" during a session with Tony in this episode. This poem will later be used prominently in Season 6 (including an episode titled "The Second Coming").
- Tony mentions to Dr. Melfi that John Gotti had a bad temper when he tells her about Janice going to anger management.
- On the drive to Kinderhook, Tony B confides to Christopher: "that Legend of Sleepy Hollow cartoon used to scare the piss out of me" and adds that "very sorry people" used to call Tony B Ichabod Crane. According to a notation by Washington Irving, the character of Ichabod Crane was based on a schoolteacher whom Irving befriended in Kinderhook, New York, in 1809.
- Tony B jokes that Tony S's blood is 65% zeppola (an Italian pastry) and that "When he heard the term "pie in the sky," he volunteered for the 82nd Airborne."
- In the audio commentary, the episode's director, Mike Figgis, points out how the scene where Christopher and Tony Blundetto dig up the skeletal remains of a man Christopher knew (and killed) symbolically referenced the famous Yorick scene in Hamlet.
- Christopher, as in episodes before, once again mistakenly calls Emil Kolar a Czechoslovak when, in fact, he was a Czech-American. Paulie Walnuts once confused Chechens with Czechoslovaks in "Pine Barrens."
- When Uncle Pat remembers where the missing bodies are buried, Christopher likens him to Johnny Mnemonic. He remembers the site due to a Swiss Colony wine bottle being on the fence.
- When Tony is flipping channels, the Cartoon Network show Whatever Happened to... Robot Jones? is seen on the TV.
- At a diner, Tony B mentions to Tony that Christopher has the same car (Hummer H2) as Schwarzenegger. Tony then, in a malapropism (the way Schwarzenegger did), calls it "the Humvee."
- Tony B calls Chris a "friend of Bill," a euphemism for a member of Alcoholics Anonymous.
- The voice on the TV program about terrorist threats to ports is Jim Lehrer of the PBS NewsHour.
- Tony misquotes the Phoebe Snow song "Harpo's Blues" (from her eponymous 1974 album) as "Harpo's Song" when he is deliberately attempting to provoke Janice during this episode's final scene.
- At dinner, when Bobby Jr. makes reference to “a G5. It has 64-bit architecture” he is referring to a Power Mac G5.

== Music ==
- The piano song played at the wedding shop visited by Christopher and Adriana is "Music Box Dancer", written by Frank Mills.
- The song played at the Bada Bing! before Tony beats Georgie up is "Stop" by Joe Henry, which Henry's sister-in-law Madonna has performed as "Don't Tell Me".
- The song played over the end credits is a 1994 live version of their 1966 song "I'm Not Like Everybody Else" by The Kinks, which is featured in their album To the Bone.

== Reception ==
Television Without Pity graded "Cold Cuts" with a C− and called it the "worst-ever episode of The Sopranos". One area of criticism was the writing, for instance of the scene of Janice's fight reported on local TV news as beneath HBO standards and Tony's session with Dr. Melfi as "psychobabble about technobabble". The review also questioned the plot about stealing Vespa scooters: "Only on The Sopranos would the mafia be dealing in motor scooters and fancy imported cheese." Additionally, Television Without Pity was critical of director Mike Figgis for the scene showing Carmela meeting school counselor Robert Wegler to say she is ending their affair, calling that scene "the worst directorial choice in the history of this show", with a slow motion edit that "serves no artistic purpose". Television critic Matt Zoller Seitz, writing for Vulture, was also critical of that editing decision, comparing it to an Akira Kurosawa film or Star Wars.
