= Where's Johnny? =

- The Sopranos episode
- Episode no.: Season 5 Episode 3
- Directed by: John Patterson
- Written by: Michael Caleo
- Cinematography by: Phil Abraham
- Production code: 503
- Original air date: March 21, 2004
- Running time: 54 minutes

Episode chronology
← Previous "Rat Pack"	Next → "All Happy Families..."
- The Sopranos season 5

"Where's Johnny?" is the 55th episode of the HBO original series The Sopranos and the third of the show's fifth season. Written by Michael Caleo and directed by John Patterson, it originally aired on March 21, 2004. It is the only episode of the entire series in which Carmela Soprano (Edie Falco) does not appear.

== Starring ==
- James Gandolfini as Tony Soprano
- Lorraine Bracco as Dr. Jennifer Melfi *
- Edie Falco as Carmela Soprano *
- Michael Imperioli as Christopher Moltisanti
- Dominic Chianese as Corrado Soprano, Jr.
- Steven Van Zandt as Silvio Dante *
- Tony Sirico as Paulie Gualtieri
- Robert Iler as Anthony Soprano, Jr.
- Jamie-Lynn DiScala as Meadow Soprano *
- Drea de Matteo as Adriana La Cerva
- Aida Turturro as Janice Soprano Baccalieri
- Steven R. Schirripa as Bobby Baccalieri
- Vincent Curatola as Johnny Sack
- John Ventimiglia as Artie Bucco
- Kathrine Narducci as Charmaine Bucco
- Steve Buscemi as Tony Blundetto

* = credit only

=== Guest starring ===
- Robert Loggia as Feech La Manna
- Patti D'Arbanville as Lorraine Calluzzo
- Frank Fortunato as Jason Evanina
- Michael Cavalieri as E. Gary La Manna
- Anthony Desio as Jimmy La Manna
- Frances Ensemplare as Nucci Gualtieri
- Louis Mustillo as Sal Vitro
- Silverio Avellino as Paul Vitro
- Richard Portnow as Harold Melvoin
- Joe Santos as Angelo Garepe
- Ed Vassalo as Tom Giglione
- Danielle Di Vecchio as Barbara Soprano Giglione
- Frank Vincent as Phil Leotardo
- Karen Young as Agent Sanseverino
- Robert Funaro as Eugene Pontecorvo
- Joseph R. Gannascoli as Vito Spatafore
- Angelo Massagli as Bobby Baccalieri III
- Miryam Coppersmith as Sophia Baccalieri
- Frank Santorelli as Georgie
- Chris Caldovino as Billy Leotardo
- Joe Maruzzo as Joey "Peeps"
- Ed Setrakian as Tommy
- Allen Enlow as Dr. Harry Winer
- Hilda Evans as Wanda
- Anna Marie Gottfried as Aunt Mary
- George T. Odom as Nelson
- Dean Edwards as Charles
- Myk Watford as Cop #1
- DeVone Lawson Jr. as Cop #2
- Madison Connolly as Alyssa Giglione
- Anthony Piccolo as Stephane Giglione

== Synopsis ==
Sal Vitro, a gardener who has been working in a particular neighborhood for decades, is told by Feech that the neighborhood now belongs to his nephew, Gary La Manna. When Sal rebuffs him, Feech viciously breaks his right arm before Tony B intervenes, reminding him that he is on parole. Paulie learns about the assault and tells Sal that, for a few percentage points, he can put things right.

Paulie visits Feech at his legitimate business, a bakery, but Feech angrily tells him to get out. Paulie then finds Gary and his brother at work, assaults them both, then empties Gary's wallet; he orders Gary to give him a cut of his profits and to pay Sal's medical bills. In a sit-down, Tony rules that the neighborhood should be divided equally between Gary and Sal. When Paulie informs Sal, he tries to hide his disappointment. Paulie adds that he will have to provide free services at the homes of "some friends of ours," including Tony and Johnny, whose lawn is huge.

Tensions rise in New York as loan shark Lorraine Calluzzo and her boyfriend, Jason Evanina, collect debts and pass payments up to Little Carmine. They are attacked by three of Johnny's men: Phil, his brother Billy, and Joey Peeps. Phil subjects Lorraine to a mock execution. She, Jason, and Angelo have a meeting with Tony and Junior. Tony recommends that the Lupertazzi family form a triumvirate composed of Johnny, Carmine, and Angelo. Angelo says he is semi-retired and just wants to spend time with his grandchildren.

Tony meets Johnny, telling him that Lorraine reached out to him. He raises the power-sharing idea from the previous meeting, framing it as Angelo’s idea. Johnny responds with contempt, accusing Tony of empowering Carmine during the dispute over the HUD scam. During a later sit-down with Johnny, Tony is accompanied by Christopher, who, despite Tony's instructions, intervenes. Johnny angrily shouts at them and the sit-down fails.

Tony mends fences with Artie Bucco, who is still holding a grudge over the loan incident. He offers Artie one of the bedrooms in his mother's house since Artie has run into problems with his living arrangements; after some hesitation, he accepts. Tony also offers a bedroom to Tony B.

Junior's dementia is gradually worsening. When an episode of Curb Your Enthusiasm comes on the TV, he mistakes Larry David and Jeff Garlin for himself and Bobby. The family gathers at Junior's house for Sunday lunch, where he insults Tony in front of everyone. A clearly upset Tony angrily asks him to not do it again. When Junior repeats the same insult moments later, an irate Tony leaves, not realizing that it is the dementia talking.

One afternoon, Junior wanders out in a bathrobe and drives to Bloomfield Avenue where his brother, Johnny Boy, once had a family hangout. It is now a storefront church and he is kicked out. Befuddled, Junior forgets where his car is parked and walks aimlessly. After dark, two Newark policemen discover him and drive him home. Janice and Bobby discuss his condition with Tony, but Tony responds with "my Uncle is dead to me." This escalates into an argument between the two siblings over old wounds. Janice slaps Tony and he starts choking her. As Bobby and Artie try to break up the fight, Artie gets hit in the eye by Janice's elbow. Janice runs out of the house crying.

Later, in a chance encounter, Junior's neurologist explains to Tony that Junior's behavior may have been due to his infarcts (mini-strokes). Tony visits Junior and asks him why he doesn't think about anything nice. "Don't you love me?" Tony asks. Junior doesn't answer, and they both quietly tear up.

== First appearances ==
- Sal Vitro: a gardener helped by Paulie who becomes indebted to the DiMeo crime family.
- Billy Leotardo: Soldier in the Lupertazzi crime family and Phil's younger brother. He was seen along with Joey "Peeps" and Phil during Lorraine Calluzzo's mock execution.

== Music ==
- The music played over the end credits is "Earth, Wind, Water" by Mitch Coodley, from The Metro Music Production Library.
- When Paulie meets with Sal Vitro to discuss Sal's problem with Feech, the song playing in the background at the bar is "Let Your Love Flow" by The Bellamy Brothers.
- When motivational speaker Tony Robbins is shown on television, the song playing is "Sirius" by the Alan Parsons Project.
- The music in the Bada Bing office is "Hypocritical" by Methods of Mayhem.

== Reception ==
"Where's Johnny?" had viewership of over 6.5 million, earning a 6.1 Nielsen rating that led all cable television programs for the week of March 15 to 21, 2004.

Television Without Pity graded the episode with an A. For TV Guide, Matt Roush praised the episode as "exceptional", for subplots like Junior Soprano's dementia and the lawn mower conflict. Alessandra Stanley commented that the scene where Junior claims to have seen himself on Curb Your Enthusiasm was an example how The Sopranos "laughs at itself before anyone can take it too seriously".
