= Long Term Parking =

- The Sopranos episode
- Episode no.: Season 5 Episode 12
- Directed by: Tim Van Patten
- Written by: Terence Winter
- Cinematography by: Alik Sakharov
- Production code: 512
- Original air date: May 23, 2004
- Running time: 56 minutes

Episode chronology
| ← Previous "The Test Dream" | Next → "All Due Respect" |
- The Sopranos season 5

"Long Term Parking" is the 64th episode of the HBO original series The Sopranos and the 12th of the show's fifth season. Written by Terence Winter and directed by Tim Van Patten, it originally aired on May 23, 2004.

This episode was the most watched program on U.S. cable television on the original week of broadcast. Critical reception was positive and the episode won Primetime Emmy Awards for the performances of Michael Imperioli and Drea de Matteo and for Winter's screenplay.

== Starring ==
- James Gandolfini as Tony Soprano
- Lorraine Bracco as Dr. Jennifer Melfi *
- Edie Falco as Carmela Soprano
- Michael Imperioli as Christopher Moltisanti
- Dominic Chianese as Corrado Soprano Jr. *
- Steven Van Zandt as Silvio Dante
- Tony Sirico as Paulie Gualtieri
- Robert Iler as Anthony Soprano Jr.
- Jamie-Lynn DiScala as Meadow Soprano *
- Drea de Matteo as Adriana La Cerva
- Aida Turturro as Janice Soprano Baccalieri *
- Vincent Curatola as Johnny Sack
- John Ventimiglia as Artie Bucco
- and Steve Buscemi as Tony Blundetto

* = credit only

=== Guest starring ===
- Frankie Valli as Rusty Millio
- Ray Abruzzo as Carmine Lupertazzi Jr.
- Karen Young as Agent Robyn Sanseverino
- Frank Vincent as Phil Leotardo
- Matt Servitto as Agent Dwight Harris
- Leslie Bega as Valentina La Paz
- Joseph R. Gannascoli as Vito Spatafore
- Frank Pellegrino as Bureau Chief Frank Cubitoso
- Chris Caldovino as Billy Leotardo
- Emad Tarabay as Matush
- Homie Doroodian as Kamal
- Arthur Nascarella as Carlo Gervasi
- George Loros as Raymond Curto
- Frank Albanese as Uncle Pat Blundetto
- Santos as Gilbert Nieves
- Patty McCormack as Liz La Cerva
- Vinnie Vella Sr. as Jimmy Petrille
- Felicity LaFortune as Dr. Sarah Klum
- Danny Petrillo as Teenage Tony Soprano
- Kyle Head as Teenage Tony Blundetto
- Adam Sietz as Walter
- Marc Damon Johnson as Ship Leader
- Jelani Jeffries as Sea Scout #1
- Esley Tate as Sea Scout #2
- Tony Siragusa as Frankie Cortese

== Synopsis ==
Little Carmine recoils from the escalating violence of the New York mob war, and Johnny becomes the new boss of the Lupertazzi family. In a sit-down with Tony, both Johnny and Phil make threats against his blood relations. Johnny says he wants Tony B "on a fucking spit". In hiding, Tony B calls Tony to apologize. Tony tells him not to come back and says he will look after his sons. He further admits why he was not at the hijack where Tony B was arrested seventeen years earlier, saying that he has always felt guilty; "Now we're even." Ending the call, they tell each other to take care. Tony then has the call traced and learns that Tony B is in upstate New York, near their uncle's now-empty house. Tony tells Johnny he knows where Tony B is and what has to be done; Johnny refuses to let Tony handle it himself and states that Tony B will be at Phil's mercy. Tony subsequently refuses to give up Tony B's location and the meeting ends antagonistically.

Tony punishes Christopher for bungling a cigarette smuggling operation. Back home, Chris rants about Tony's treatment and what he sees as his favoritism towards Tony B. Adriana, under intense stress, is diagnosed with ulcerative colitis. When FBI surveillance catches her behaving oddly with a bag of garbage behind her nightclub, she is brought in. She admits that she was cleaning up after a murder in her office: drug dealer Matush killed a customer who claimed he had been ripped off. Threatened with imprisonment for covering up the murder, Adriana is told she has to wear a wire. She refuses but persuades the FBI that Chris is ready to turn. They let her go, with a deadline for bringing him in.

When Adriana tells Chris she has been talking to the FBI, he reacts violently and begins to strangle her before he breaks down crying. They eventually agree to flee and start a new life. Getting gas for his Hummer H2 the next morning, Chris pensively observes a poor family in front of the gas station, their meager possessions strapped to the roof of a run-down car. Adriana soon receives a call from Tony, telling her that Chris has made a suicide attempt; Silvio will come to take her to the hospital. Instead, he drives her to an area of deserted woodland, turns off the road onto a track and stops. As Adriana realizes that Silvio has been ordered by Tony to kill her, Sil drags her out of the car. As she crawls away, crying and begging for her life, he shoots and kills her.

Chris moves out of his apartment, dumps a suitcase of Adriana's belongings in a riverside dumping ground and puts her car in long-term parking at Newark Liberty International Airport. At the Bada Bing, Tony sees that Chris is doped on heroin; he says the pain is too much. Tony loses control and beats him up, saying Chris is not the only one in pain.

Tony and Carmela negotiate over her desire to build a house on spec in partnership with her father Hugh. Tony agrees to pay $600,000 for the land and promises that his "midlife crisis will no longer intrude anymore" into their marriage. They are reconciled and he moves back into their house. Tony goes to see Valentina in the hospital and breaks up with her. She is furious with Tony and devastated.

== Deceased ==
- Gilbert Nieves: stabbed to death by Matush Giomana (in flashback).
- Adriana La Cerva: shot and killed by Silvio Dante for being an informant to the FBI.

Additionally, Billy Leotardo's murder by Tony Blundetto, previously mentioned only, is shown in Phil Leotardo's flashback.

== Title reference ==
- Christopher parks Adriana's car in the "Long Term Parking" section at the airport.
- "If I'm ever missing, check the airports. That's where they always leave the car." -- Johnny Roselli (1905–1976), gangster. For example, Louis LaRasso's car was left in the parking lot of Kennedy Airport to give the impression that he had fled the region.
- "Long-term parking" could refer to a long-term decision, or putting oneself in a lasting or binding situation: Adriana suggesting she and Christopher join the Witness Protection Program; Carmela and Tony moving back in together; Tony B.'s attempts to disappear; and Christopher's and Tony's guilt over the death of Adriana.
- The title could refer to the state of Christopher's soul, which could be forever damned for his betrayal of Adriana.
- When Adriana is picked up by the FBI outside the pharmacy, she mentions that her car is still in the parking lot.
- In the previous episode, Tony is asked whether he'd like short-term or long-term parking as he arrives at The Plaza hotel.

== Production ==
- To combat leaked storylines, the writers and Chase used to devise fake scenes to confuse the set. The scene in which Adriana was killed was shot in two ways: with her getting away, and with her being shot in the woods.
- Many fans speculated that Adriana had survived because her death was not shown on-screen. However, Drea de Matteo confirmed in her 2005 DVD commentary that Adriana was indeed killed. De Matteo quotes Van Zandt as saying: "Do [the fans] think I was shooting squirrels?" Later in the DVD commentary, de Matteo talks about the strong fan reaction to Adriana's death.
- In 2014, during an "Ask Me Anything" session on Reddit, de Matteo stated: "All of us had known already that my character was dying - [Steven] Van Zandt was actually the most pissed off about it, he didn't want to do it, he just didn't want to do it. And I had to talk him into how awesome it was gonna be and how important it was, he didn't want to pull me out of that car, he didn't want to call me a c-word, he didn't want to shoot me in the head, but David [Chase] made a specific point not to show my character actually getting the bullet to her head. I'm not sure if that was for cliffhangers reasons, but he said it was from respect for the character."
- De Matteo asked David Chase to cut out the scene where Christopher tells Tony about Adriana in order to keep her death at the hands of Silvio a surprise. The scene was later aired in the sixth-season episode "The Ride," as a flashback sequence.

== References to other media ==
- During a conversation with Carmela, Tony quotes Popeye's catchphrase "I yam what I yam!"
- Christopher's line "The highway's jammed with broken heroes on a last chance power drive" is from Bruce Springsteen's song "Born to Run," a pop culture reference made more apropos by the presence of Steven Van Zandt (as Silvio Dante), longtime guitarist in Springsteen's E Street Band. Van Zandt also sings backing vocals on the "Born To Run" track.
- Christopher calls Adriana "my smelly Valentine", punning on "My Funny Valentine".
- Johnny Sack derisively mutters "the lone gunman theory," the official story that Lee Harvey Oswald acted alone in assassinating John F. Kennedy.
- The scene with Christopher and Adriana where both of them are crying over the consequences of Adriana being an informant, including Chris's strangled wail of "Oh, God, what are we gonna do?!" mirror a similar scene in the 1990 film Goodfellas where Henry and Karen Hill are falling apart at the realization they are in mortal danger from Paulie Cicero and his crew after Henry's narcotics bust.
- The scene with Tony Soprano sitting alone in his backyard reminiscing about his cousin closely resembles the ending scene of The Godfather Part II, in which Michael Corleone sits alone at his Lake Tahoe compound remembering a moment shared with his family.
- Tony watches the film It's a Gift on TV after he moves back in with Carmela.
- The film Christopher is watching at the Bada Bing after admitting to Tony that he snorted some heroin is Three Amigos.
- The body of Nieves is found by the Sea Scouts of Montclair on a beach in Long Branch.
- When Agent Sanseverino, while discussing with Agent Harris and Chief Cubitoso what could motivate Christopher and Adriana to "flip" and then go into witness protection, says that Christopher has "got some interest in screenwriting", Cubitoso jokingly replies, "I'll put in a call to Sam Goldwyn." (Goldwyn died decades before this episode).

== References to past episodes ==
- The Crazy Horse club and the character Matush were both introduced in "The Telltale Moozadell" in a storyline in which Matush was repeatedly kicked out of the club for dealing drugs on the premises.
- Christopher dumps Adriana's suitcase in the same location where Tony had almost killed him in "Irregular Around the Margins."

== Music ==
- Lou Christie's song "Summer Snow" is playing in Phil Leotardo's flashback of his brother Billy's murder.
- The song playing when Tony enters his Bada Bing office near the end of the episode is "Super Bon Bon" by Soul Coughing.
- The Shawn Smith song, "Leaving California," plays in the background while Silvio drives with Adriana.
- The song playing in Silvio's car when he parks in the woods is "Barracuda" by Heart.
- The song played over the end credits is another song by Shawn Smith, "Wrapped in My Memory," from Shield of Thorns.

== Awards ==
- Terence Winter won the Primetime Emmy Award for Outstanding Writing for a Drama Series for his work on this episode.
- Tim Van Patten was nominated for the Primetime Emmy Award for Outstanding Directing for a Drama Series for his work on this episode.
- Drea de Matteo won the Primetime Emmy Award for Outstanding Supporting Actress in a Drama Series for her performance in this episode.
- Michael Imperioli won the Primetime Emmy Award for Outstanding Supporting Actor in a Drama Series for his performance in this episode.
- Empire named "Long Term Parking" the best Sopranos episode of all time.
- In 2005, TV Land included this episode as part of its 'Top 100 Most Unexpected Moments in TV History', ranking it #56.

== Reception ==
"Long Term Parking" had nearly six million viewers on its original broadcast, for a 5.5 Nielsen rating that led all U.S. cable television programming for the week of May 17 to 23, 2004. Television Without Pity graded this episode with an A+. The Star-Ledger critic Alan Sepinwall praised the plot depth and acting of Imperioli as Christopher and de Matteo as Adriana. Sepinwall regarded the scene of Christopher angrily reacting to Adriana being an informant as "one of the most terrifying 'Sopranos' moments ever."
