= Rat Pack (The Sopranos) =

- The Sopranos episode
- Episode no.: Season 5 Episode 2
- Directed by: Alan Taylor
- Written by: Matthew Weiner
- Cinematography by: Alik Sakharov
- Production code: 502
- Original air date: March 14, 2004
- Running time: 57 minutes

Episode chronology
← Previous "Two Tonys"	Next → "Where's Johnny?"
- The Sopranos season 5

"Rat Pack" is the 54th episode of the HBO original series The Sopranos and is the second of the show's fifth season. Written by Matthew Weiner and directed by Alan Taylor, it originally aired on March 14, 2004.

== Starring ==
- James Gandolfini as Tony Soprano
- Lorraine Bracco as Jennifer Melfi *
- Edie Falco as Carmela Soprano
- Michael Imperioli as Christopher Moltisanti
- Dominic Chianese as Corrado Soprano Jr.
- Steven Van Zandt as Silvio Dante
- Tony Sirico as Paulie Gualtieri
- Robert Iler as Anthony Soprano Jr.
- Jamie-Lynn DiScala as Meadow Soprano
- Drea de Matteo as Adriana La Cerva
- Aida Turturro as Janice Soprano Baccalieri
- Steven R. Schirripa as Bobby Baccalieri
- Vincent Curatola as Johnny Sack
- John Ventimiglia as Artie Bucco
- Steve Buscemi as Tony Blundetto

* = credit only

=== Guest starring ===
- Jerry Adler as Hesh Rabkin

=== Also guest starring ===
- Ray Abruzzo as Little Carmine
- Rae Allen as Aunt Quintina Blundetto
- David Copeland as Joey Cogo
- Patti D'Arbanville as Lorraine Calluzzo
- Robert Desiderio as Jack Massarone
- Vanessa Ferlito as Tina Francesco
- Lola Glaudini as Agent Deborah Ciccerone
- Tony Lip as Carmine Lupertazzi
- Robert Loggia as Michele "Feech" La Manna
- George Loros as Raymond Curto
- Frank Pando as Agent Grasso
- Frank Pellegrino as Bureau Chief Frank Cubitoso
- Joe Santos as Angelo Garepe
- Matt Servitto as Agent Harris
- Vinny Vella as Jimmy Petrille
- Frank Vincent as Phil Leotardo
- Karen Young as Agent Sanseverino
- Sharon Angela as Rosalie Aprile
- Maureen Van Zandt as Gabriella Dante
- Denise Borino as Ginny Sacrimoni
- Robert Funaro as Eugene Pontecorvo
- Joseph R. Gannascoli as Vito Spatafore
- Dan Grimaldi as Patsy Parisi
- Richard Maldone as Albert Barese
- Carl Capotorto as Little Paulie Germani
- Dan Castleman as Prosecutor Castleman
- Angelo Massagli as Bobby Baccalieri III
- Miryam Coppersmith as Sophia Baccalieri
- Frank Fortunato as Jason Evanina
- Scott Johnsen as Cop
- Joe Maruzzo as Joey Peeps

== Synopsis ==
Carmine dies; Little Carmine and Johnny both claim to succeed him as head of the Lupertazzi family. Tony has a meeting with Jack Massarone, who presents him with a painting of the Rat Pack. Tony does not know, at first, that Massarone is now an FBI informant; he receives the tip from a source of Patsy’s. Tony arranges another meeting and hugs Massarone, trying to find the wire, which is hidden in his baseball cap. He does not know what to think but realizes that Massarone said one thing out of key: he complimented Tony on losing weight, when in fact he has been noticeably gaining weight. Tony spends a restless night, then drives to the Pulaski Skyway and tosses Massarone's painting into the river below. Massarone is found dead in the trunk of his car the next day.

Another informant, Soprano capo Ray Curto, helps FBI agents correct a transcript of a meeting he recorded. A third informant, Adriana La Cerva, is immensely uncomfortable leaking information about Christopher and Tony. Her handler, Agent Robyn Sanseverino, tells her about a family tragedy that compelled her to join the Bureau and says Adriana is with "the good guys now", but Adriana is not comforted. At a social gathering with Carmela and other mob wives, her guilt is inflamed when Rosalie tells her that Big Pussy Bonpensiero's widow, Angie, is not welcome in their group. A tearful Adriana nearly admits the truth but instead flees, and stumbles and hurts herself in the driveway. She refuses the women's offers of first aid and speeds away in her car. Adriana then tells Sanseverino that her friend Tina, who has been flirting with Christopher, is embezzling money from the company where she works.

Tony greets Tony B after he is released from prison. At his welcome-home party at Nuovo Vesuvio, Tony tells the guests how important his cousin was to him when he was growing up. Tony B is disappointed that his ex-wife and twin sons are not there. There is some awkwardness when the circumstances of his arrest are raised, and when he seems to mock Tony's weight. Tony offers his cousin a place in a stolen airbag operation, but Tony B seeks to go legitimate by becoming a state-licensed massage therapist. A disappointed Tony tells Christopher and Silvio that his cousin is "useless". He rebukes Tony B for making jokes about him, as he is now "the boss", and for giving massages in the office. However, in a late-night phone call, he seems to soften his tone and they reconcile.

== First appearances ==
- Lorraine Calluzzo: loan shark working for the Lupertazzi crime family, also known as "Lady Shylock."
- Jason Evanina: Lorraine Calluzzo's loan-sharking partner and lover.
- Tony Blundetto (first physical appearance): Tony's cousin and DiMeo/Soprano crime family member who was sent to federal prison in 1986 for hijacking a tractor-trailer.
- Phil Leotardo (first physical appearance): Captain in the Lupertazzi crime family, recently released from prison after serving 20 years.

== Deceased ==
- Joseph "Joey" Cogo: killed offscreen in a payment dispute. Agent Sanseverino shows photos of his corpse to Adriana, who confirms his identity and having seen him previously with certain mob members.
- Carmine Lupertazzi Sr.: died of complications due to stroke
- Jack Massarone: killed for being an FBI informant. Massarone is found dead in the trunk of a car by FBI agents.

== Title reference ==
- Jack Massarone gives Tony a painting of Frank Sinatra, Dean Martin and Sammy Davis Jr., who were all members of the "Rat Pack."
- The three informants are all "rats." University of Ottawa professor of Italian studies Franco Ricci summarizes the symbolism: "In an episode...where informants seem to crawl out of the woodwork like rats, Tony's ideal world of Rat Pack camaraderie has been reduced to a painted dream."
- Junior refers to the newly released ex-cons as "the Class of 2004, old rats on a new ship."

== References to other media ==
- The wiretap recording that Ray Curto is helping the FBI transcribe is from the capos meeting in "For All Debts Public and Private."
- Anthony Jr. can be seen watching the movie Scarface, in which Tony Montana opens fire on armed men in the scene.
- Paulie quotes from Sun Tzu's The Art of War, mispronouncing the author's name as "Sun-Ta-Zu," confusing Tony Blundetto until corrected by Silvio. He also mistakenly refers to Sun Tzu as "the Chinese Prince Matchabelli" instead of Niccolò Machiavelli, the author of The Prince. Prince Matchabelli is a line of perfumes. Tony Soprano also uses this Matchabelli malapropism in Season 3, Episode 8 during his therapy session.
- In one scene, Tony is shown watching a tearful recollection by WWII veteran Edward Heffron in "Points," the final episode of the HBO mini-series Band of Brothers.
- Tony Blundetto jokingly calls Paulie Grandpa Munster (from The Munsters) because of his hair.
- Tony Blundetto does an impression of Jackie Gleason's character Reginald Van Gleason III from The Jackie Gleason Show.
- At Carmela's house, due to Tony's removing the media system, the women enjoy snacks and wine instead of watching Casablanca. The next movie on AFI's 100 Years...100 Movies list is The Godfather.
- Before watching Citizen Kane, Carmela reads the review of the film from Leonard Maltin's Movie Guide; she is unable to pronounce screenwriter Herman J. Mankiewicz's last name.
- Artie asks Tony B "Where's Tubbs?" in regard to his outfit at his welcoming home party. It is a nod to the cop show Miami Vice which was popular during the time of Tony B's arrest.

== Reference to real events ==
- After Carmine Lupertazzi dies, Bobby mentions that he had heard Carmine invented point shaving. To this, Uncle Junior nostalgically recalls, "CCNY versus Kentucky, 1951. Nobody beat the spread, I bought a black Fleetwood." This refers to the actual CCNY Point Shaving Scandal of 1950-1951.

== Music ==
- Roy Orbison's "Crying", and "It Hurts to Be in Love", by Gene Pitney both play in the diner during the first scene.
- In the coffee shop scene between Adriana and Agent Sanseverino, "The Way It Is" by Bruce Hornsby and the Range can be heard playing in the background.
- "Walk With Me" by Felix Da Housecat is playing in the background in the first scene between Adriana, Christopher, and Tina at the Crazy Horse. In a later scene, "She Will Be Loved" by Maroon 5 is playing.
- "Canzona in D Minor" (BWV 588) by Johann Sebastian Bach is playing at Carmine Lupertazzi's wake.
- Tony Blundetto's cellphone ringtone is Queen's "We Are the Champions".
- Dean Martin singing "Powder Your Face With Sunshine (Smile Smile Smile)" is playing at Nuovo Vesuvio when the Tonys arrive together.
- The song played over the end credits is "Undercover of the Night" by The Rolling Stones.

== Reception ==
Television Without Pity graded the episode with an A−. In 2020, Nick Braccia described "Rat Pack" as "the most noir and hard-boiled episode of The Sopranos".

Robert Bianco of USA Today praised the episode for introducing "an unusually strong influx of new Sopranos characters" such as Feech and Tony B.
