= The Sopranos season 5 =

Television show season

The Sopranos
- Season 5
- Region 1 DVD cover art
- Starring: James Gandolfini; Lorraine Bracco; Edie Falco; Michael Imperioli; Dominic Chianese; Steven Van Zandt; Tony Sirico; Robert Iler; Jamie-Lynn Sigler; Drea de Matteo; Aida Turturro; John Ventimiglia; Vincent Curatola; Steve Schirripa; Kathrine Narducci; Steve Buscemi
- No. of episodes: 13

Release
- Original network: HBO
- Original release: March 7 – June 6, 2004

Season chronology
- ← Previous; Season 4 Next → Season 6

The fifth season of the American crime drama series The Sopranos aired on HBO from March 7 to June 6, 2004. The fifth season was released on DVD in region 1 on June 7, 2005.

The story of season five focuses on the return of two prominent members of the DiMeo family, Tony Blundetto and Feech La Manna, who are released from lengthy stays in prison and struggle to reintegrate themselves with the family and the life of crime. Several prominent members of the Lupertazzi family also return from prison, most notably Phil Leotardo. The subsequent power vacuum caused by the death of boss Carmine creates a growing rift between the New York and New Jersey crime families. Tony and Carmela adjust to their new lives and each other following their separation, which greatly affects their son A.J. Uncle Junior's mental health starts to deteriorate, and Adriana's guilt over her role as an FBI informant grows.

== Cast ==
=== Main cast ===
- James Gandolfini as Tony Soprano, the De facto boss of the DiMeo crime family, whose relationships with his wife and cousins are becoming increasingly strained.
- Lorraine Bracco as Dr. Jennifer Melfi, Tony's therapist, whom he rekindles his romantic interest in.
- Edie Falco as Carmela Soprano, Tony's wife, who is trying to get a divorce from him but finds it difficult.
- Michael Imperioli as Christopher Moltisanti, a soldier and Tony's cousin by marriage, who struggles to keep his sobriety.
- Dominic Chianese as Corrado "Junior" Soprano, Jr., Tony's uncle and the official boss of the family, who is becoming increasingly detached from reality.
- Steven Van Zandt as Silvio Dante, Tony's loyal consigliere.
- Tony Sirico as Paulie "Walnuts" Gualtieri, a short-tempered capo of the Soprano/Gualtieri crew.
- Robert Iler as Anthony Soprano Jr., Tony's son, who becomes more defiant after his parents split up.
- Jamie-Lynn Sigler as Meadow Soprano, Tony's daughter.
- Drea de Matteo as Adriana La Cerva, Chris's fiancée, who struggles with her loyalty to him and her forced loyalty to the FBI.
- Aida Turturro as Janice Soprano, Tony's dramatic sister, whose anger starts to become a problem for her family.
- Steven R. Schirripa as Bobby "Bacala" Baccalieri, a kind-hearted capo and husband to Janice.
- Vincent Curatola as John "Johnny Sack" Sacrimoni, the underboss of the Lupertazzi family who engages in a power struggle with Little Carmine.
- John Ventimiglia as Artie Bucco, Tony's estranged non-mob friend who runs a restaurant.
- Kathrine Narducci as Charmaine Bucco, Artie's ex-wife.
- Steve Buscemi as Tony Blundetto, Tony's ex-convict cousin whom he gives leeway out of guilt over an incident in their past.

=== Recurring cast ===
- Dan Grimaldi as Patsy Parisi, a DiMeo soldier in the Gualtieri crew.
- Sharon Angela as Rosalie Aprile, Carmela's best friend.
- Joseph R. Gannascoli as Vito Spatafore, a DiMeo capo over the Aprile crew.
- Frank Vincent as Phil Leotardo, a Lupertazzi capo who is released from prison after two decades and loyalist to Johnny Sack.
- Robert Funaro as Eugene Pontecorvo, a DiMeo soldier in the Aprile crew.
- Max Casella as Benny Fazio, a young DiMeo associate in the Gualtieri crew.
- Carl Capotorto as Little Paulie Germani, Paulie's nephew and DiMeo associate in his uncle's crew.
- Ray Abruzzo as Little Carmine Lupertazzi, Carmine's son and capo that feuds with Johnny over control of the Lupertazzi family.
- Joe Santos as Angelo Garepe, longtime Lupertazzi consigliere, released from prison, having formed a close friendship with Blundetto while they served.
- Jerry Adler as Herman "Hesh" Rabkin, Tony's Jewish associate and adviser.
- Robert Loggia as Feech La Manna, a longtime DiMeo capo recently released from prison who questions Tony's authority.
- Rae Allen as Quintina Blundetto, Tony Blundetto's mother and Livia Soprano's younger sister.
- Frankie Valli as Rusty Millio, a Lupertazzi capo and adviser to Little Carmine.
- Chris Caldovino as Billy Leotardo, a Lupertazzi family soldier and younger brother of Phil Leotardo

== Episodes ==
Season 5 episodes
| No. overall | No. in season | Title | Directed by | Written by | Original release date | U.S. viewers (millions) |
|---|---|---|---|---|---|---|
| 53 | 1 | "Two Tonys" | Tim Van Patten | Terence Winter and David Chase | March 7, 2004 | 12.14 |
Ten months after the events of the fourth season, four men imprisoned for two decades are released on parole, while Carmine Lupertazzi has a stroke. Chris is increasingly frustrated with having to cover dinner bills for Paulie, who intentionally racks up an expensive one. They argue and are interrupted by a waiter upset by his meager tip. Chris throws a brick at him when he insults them, causing him to have a seizure. Paulie kills him and takes the money from the bill. Tony, now living in Livia's house, tries to start a romance with Melfi, but she rebuffs his advances despite admitting to Elliot Kupferberg that she initially felt attracted to him. Tony asks her why she will not be with him, but storms out when she brings up his morals. A black bear wanders into the Sopranos' backyard, and Tony goes there and takes over guard duty.
| 54 | 2 | "Rat Pack" | Alan Taylor | Matthew Weiner | March 14, 2004 | 9.97 |
A friend of Tony's, secretly an FBI informant, gifts him a painting of the Rat Pack. After receiving a tip that the man is working against him, Tony throws the painting into a river and the man is found dead the next day. Carmine dies, leaving Johnny determined not to let Little Carmine take over the Lupertazzi family. Tony's released cousin Tony Blundetto makes a joke about Tony's weight upon his return. Tony offers him a place in his criminal ventures, but Blundetto is happy with getting a legitimate job and wants to become a massage therapist. When Tony catches him giving his men massages, he berates him for the joke, only to later apologize. Spending time with the other mob wives, Adriana notices that Angie never comes around. Rosalie explains that because of her husband's status as an informant, she is no longer invited. Adriana almost admits her predicament, only to flee and later give her handler information about a friend of hers that has been flirting with Chris.
| 55 | 3 | "Where's Johnny?" | John Patterson | Michael Caleo | March 21, 2004 | 10.11 |
Released DiMeo capo Michele "Feech" La Manna brutalizes a local gardener while trying to get his nephew's business off the ground. Paulie beats up Feech's nephew in retaliation, and Tony decides to split the territory in half and give the gardener a meager payout, provided he mows his and Johnny's lawns for free. Lorraine Calluzzo, a loan shark working for Little Carmine, is attacked by released Lupertazzi capo Phil Leotardo, his brother Billy, and Joey "Peeps" Peparelli. While trying to resolve the situation, Tony brings Chris along to a meeting, who tanks it when he speaks out of turn. As Junior's mental state erodes, he repeatedly insists that Tony "never had the makings of a varsity athlete." He drives to Newark, looking for Tony's deceased father until the police bring him back to Janice. Tony learns from Junior's neurologist that he has suffered several infarcts. He asks Junior why he insisted on repeating the athlete comment and asks "don't you love me?", causing both men to quietly become emotional.
| 56 | 4 | "All Happy Families..." | Rodrigo García | Toni Kalem | March 28, 2004 | 9.69 |
As A.J.'s grades begin to slip, Tony and Carmela argue about how to deal with him, during which she points out that Tony has no real friends and that his men laugh at his jokes out of obligation, which he tests by telling a joke and finds her to be correct. Feech's men steal cars from the wedding of an associate of Tony's, and Tony remembers Feech did not laugh at his joke. He has Chris set Feech up to be caught by his parole officer with a load of stolen TVs, and Feech gazes longingly at the outside world on the bus back to prison. Calluzzo is murdered by Peeps and the Leotardos. Carmela allows A.J. to go to a concert in New York, but he instead gets high with his friends in a hotel room. Carmela sends him to live with Tony. She goes to lunch with A.J.'s guidance counselor, Robert Wegler, who recommends the novel Madame Bovary on the grounds that she resembles the main character. She returns home to find her house empty.
| 57 | 5 | "Irregular Around the Margins" | Allen Coulter | Robin Green & Mitchell Burgess | April 4, 2004 | 9.75 |
Tony has a mole removed that turns out to be skin cancer. He has a sexually tense moment with Adriana at the Crazy Horse, but he does not act, admitting to Melfi that he wanted to but understood it would be bad for everyone involved. While driving to buy cocaine with Adriana, Tony swerves to avoid hitting a raccoon and crashes. A rumor spreads that the accident happened because Adriana was performing fellatio on him, which Chris learns of when Vito jokes about it, almost starting a fight. He beats Adriana, relapses, and goes to the Bada Bing with a gun. Tony prepares to kill him if he cannot accept the truth, but Blundetto instead convinces him to have Chris talk to the doctor who treated them after the accident, who explains that Adriana's injuries indicate she was sitting upright. Chris is satisfied, but still upset that everyone else believes the rumor, while Tony complains to Melfi that he may as well have had sex with Adriana. Tony, Chris, Adriana, and Carmela go to dinner together to publicly prove there are no issues between them, and Vito passes by and wishes Chris a pleasant evening.
| 58 | 6 | "Sentimental Education" | Peter Bogdanovich | Matthew Weiner | April 11, 2004 | 9.93 |
A.J. is sent back to Carmela after he and Tony frequently argue. She and Wegler begin having sex, which she confesses to Phil Intintola but ignores his criticisms of her. Wegler pressures one of A.J.'s teachers to give him a passing grade on a paper and eventually concludes that Carmela is using him. He leaves, and Carmela laments to Hugh DeAngelis (Note: Carmela's father, first seen in "Guy Walks into a Psychiatrist's Office...".) that her motives will always be questioned as Tony's wife. Blundetto and his Korean employer start off hostile, but they grow to respect each other and he offers to help fund Blundetto's massage parlor. Blundetto happens upon a bag of money discarded by drug dealers and gambles most of it away, and ends up beating his employer when the stress of his jobs gets to him. He asks Tony if he needs assistance with any of his operations.
| 59 | 7 | "In Camelot" | Steve Buscemi | Terence Winter | April 18, 2004 | 9.08 |
Chris invites J.T. Dolan, a screenwriter he met in rehab, to a gambling game, which puts him in severe debt. Chris beats him up after he cannot pay, putting him back on heroin, and he sends Dolan back to rehab. Junior, still on house arrest, begins going to the funerals of anyone he vaguely knows to get out of the house, but weeps uncontrollably at the funeral of Tony's uncle and admits to his physician that the lack of purpose in his life depresses him. Tony meets Johnny Soprano's old comare and collects money that Hesh Rabkin (Note: Johnny's old friend, first seen in "The Sopranos".) and Phil owe her. His friendship with the woman takes a turn when he learns that his father gave his childhood dog away to her son, and that he was with her when Livia had a miscarriage while Tony covered for him. Melfi encourages Tony to have more sympathy for Livia because of this, but he rejects the idea.
| 60 | 8 | "Marco Polo" | John Patterson | Michael Imperioli | April 25, 2004 | 9.99 |
Carmela's mother asks her not to invite Tony to Hugh's seventy-fifth surprise birthday, which Tony agrees to. Junior intentionally ruins the surprise, and Hugh demands Tony come. Tony gifts him a Beretta shotgun, but an upper-class guest devalues it by pointing out the best Berettas are not exported. Carmela realizes her mother wanted Tony not to come solely so he would not embarrass her in front of the guest, despite his good behavior throughout, and tells her off. Carmela and Tony have sex after everyone leaves. Blundetto's former cellmate and Lupertazzi consigliere Angelo Garepe tries to hire him to kill Peeps in revenge for Calluzzo, but Blundetto turns him down until he sees how much better Tony is living than him. He kills Peeps, but Peeps's car rolls over his foot as he flees the scene.
| 61 | 9 | "Unidentified Black Males" | Tim Van Patten | Matthew Weiner and Terence Winter | May 2, 2004 | 8.96 |
Tony has a panic attack after learning that both Blundetto and Peeps's killer have limps. Johnny suspects both Little Carmine's and Blundetto's parts in the hit, but Tony covers for Blundetto when confronted. In therapy, Tony admits the truth as to why he gives Blundetto so much leeway: on the night the Tonys were supposed to commit a robbery, Tony had a panic attack after arguing with Livia and injured himself, leaving Blundetto to go to jail. Tony gets Meadow's boyfriend Finn DeTrolio a job at a construction site. Finn arrives to work early one day and finds Vito fellating a man. With Vito subtly threatening him, Finn plans to leave town, leading to a lengthy argument with Meadow that ends when he proposes to her. Carmela still plans to divorce Tony and obtain a fair share of their assets, but is distraught to learn that he has consulted all the divorce attorneys in the area to prevent them from taking her case. She returns home to find him relaxing in the pool, becoming tearful as Meadow calls to report her engagement.
| 62 | 10 | "Cold Cuts" | Mike Figgis | Robin Green & Mitchell Burgess | May 9, 2004 | 8.48 |
Carmela and Tony argue about his actions, but when she encounters Wegler, she tells him that Tony is moving back in. Chris vents to Adriana about the favoritism Blundetto receives, but when Adriana suggests they start a new life somewhere, Chris insists he is with Tony for life. He and Blundetto are sent to their uncle's farm to dispose of bodies buried there, and the two bond. Tony shows up to oversee the last of the job, and the Tonys mock Chris's sobriety, leaving him to drive home in tears. Janice, now married to Bobby, is arrested after attacking a mother at her stepdaughter's soccer game. Tony demands Bobby get her under control, and he requests she either take anger management classes or end their marriage. She takes the classes and makes significant progress, while at the Bada Bing, Georgie Santorelli (Note: A Bada Bing worker and frequent subject of Tony's abuse, first seen in "46 Long".) remarks that "you've gotta live for today," causing Tony to beat him so badly he goes partially deaf. Paulie informs Tony that Georgie is quitting. He has dinner with the Baccalieris and becomes irritated when Janice no longer gets angry at minor annoyances, provoking her into attacking him and leaving with a satisfied smile.
| 63 | 11 | "The Test Dream" | Allen Coulter | David Chase and Matthew Weiner | May 16, 2004 | 8.81 |
The Leotardos kill Garepe. Valentina La Paz (Note: Tony's girlfriend, first seen in "Mergers and Acquisitions".) is hospitalized with severe burns after trying to cook for Tony, and he goes to stay at the Plaza Hotel for the night. He learns of Garepe's death and tries to contact Blundetto, who ignores him. Tony falls asleep and dreams of the deceased people in his life. He has therapy with Gloria Trillo and is driven by his father to "the job." Tony and Carmela have dinner with Meadow, Finn, and Finn's parents, Vin Makazian (Note: A deceased police detective formerly in Tony's employ, first seen in "Meadowlands".) and Annette Bening. In the dream, Blundetto kills Phil outside the restaurant and Tony is blamed for not stopping him, and Artie rescues him from a mob chasing him. He has sex with Charmaine while Artie cheers him on, and is then riding Pie-O-My through his house, Carmela allowing him to move back in on the condition of "you can't bring your horse in here!" He arrives in the office of his high school football coach, who criticizes Tony for taking the easy way out by choosing the mob life. As Tony tries to shoot him, his gun falls apart and he wakes up. Chris visits to inform him that Blundetto wounded Phil and killed his brother Billy Leotardo. Tony calls Carmela and tells her he had "one of my Coach Molinaro dreams."
| 64 | 12 | "Long Term Parking" | Tim Van Patten | Terence Winter | May 23, 2004 | 9.53 |
The body of a drug dealer is traced to the Crazy Horse, and surveillance footage reveals to the FBI that Adriana disposed of evidence from the murder. She convinces them that Chris can be made into an informant, but he nearly kills her when she admits the truth to him. He eventually agrees to start a new life with her, but hesitates when he notices an unhappy couple resembling them at a gas station. Tony tells Adriana that Chris attempted suicide and that Silvio will take her to the hospital, but Silvio instead takes her into the woods and kills her. Tony later finds Chris, having sold her out, on heroin. When Chris tells him he is trying to cope with the pain, Tony beats him. Blundetto calls Tony to apologize, who tells him the truth about the night he was arrested and has the call traced to near their uncle's farm. He refuses to give Blundetto up to Johnny and Phil. He moves back in with Carmela and promises to help her build a spec house. Carmela takes him to the spot where she plans to build and notices that he looks troubled, but he brushes her off.
| 65 | 13 | "All Due Respect" | John Patterson | David Chase and Robin Green & Mitchell Burgess | June 6, 2004 | 10.98 |
Phil begins hunting Chris, and Tony insists to his men that he is protecting Blundetto like he would any of them, but dissent begins to grow amongst them after Phil brutalizes soldier Benny Fazio. Tony goes to Junior for help, but he is too dazed to give him advice. Both Melfi and Silvio warn him that he is protecting Blundetto out of guilt and pride, and he discovers the painting of him and Pie-O-My that Paulie had redone (Note: As depicted in "The Strong, Silent Type".) when he goes to visit him. Tony is perplexed and annoyed by it, but Paulie insists he had it made out of genuine respect. Tony rips it off the wall, but stares forlornly at his painted face after he throws it in a dumpster. Knowing Phil will torture Blundetto, Tony goes to their uncle's farm and kills him quickly before giving Phil his location. He visits Johnny's house to negotiate peace. Just as they reach an agreement, the FBI arrives to arrest Johnny, and Tony gets rid of his gun and flees into the woods. A disheveled Tony arrives home hours later, and Carmela ushers him inside.

== Reception ==
=== Critical reviews ===
The show's fifth season has a 93% approval rating with an average score of 9.3/10 based on 14 reviews on Rotten Tomatoes, with the following critical consensus: "The penultimate season of The Sopranos hurtles toward the series' climax without sacrificing the compelling stories and vibrant characters that made it an acknowledged television classic."

Scott Brown of Entertainment Weekly graded the season five DVD with an A−.

=== Awards and nominations ===
| Year | Association | Category | Nominee(s) | Result | Ref. |
|---|---|---|---|---|---|
| 2004 | Primetime Emmy Awards | Outstanding Drama Series | | Won | |
| 2004 | Primetime Emmy Awards | Outstanding Lead Actor in a Drama Series | James Gandolfini (episode: "Where's Johnny?") | Nominated | |
| 2004 | Primetime Emmy Awards | Outstanding Lead Actress in a Drama Series | Edie Falco (episode: "All Happy Families") | Nominated | |
| 2004 | Primetime Emmy Awards | Outstanding Supporting Actor in a Drama Series | Michael Imperioli (episodes: "Irregular Around the Margins" + "Long Term Parking") | Won | |
| 2004 | Primetime Emmy Awards | Outstanding Supporting Actor in a Drama Series | Steve Buscemi (episodes: "Rat Pack" + "Marco Polo") | Nominated | |
| 2004 | Primetime Emmy Awards | Outstanding Supporting Actress in a Drama Series | Drea de Matteo (Episodes: "Irregular Around the Margins" + "Long Term Parking") | Won | |
| 2004 | Primetime Emmy Awards | Outstanding Directing for a Drama Series | Allen Coulter (episode: "Irregular Around the Margins") | Nominated | |
| 2004 | Primetime Emmy Awards | Outstanding Directing for a Drama Series | Timothy Van Patten (Episode: "Long Term Parking") | Nominated | |
| 2004 | Primetime Emmy Awards | Outstanding Writing for a Drama Series | Terrence Winter (episode: "Long Term Parking") | Won | |
| 2004 | Primetime Emmy Awards | Outstanding Writing for a Drama Series | Matthew Weiner, Terrence Winter (episode: "Unidentified Black Males") | Nominated | |
| 2004 | Primetime Emmy Awards | Outstanding Writing for a Drama Series | Michael Caleo (episode: "Where's Johnny?") | Nominated | |
| 2004 | Primetime Emmy Awards | Outstanding Writing for a Drama Series | Robin Green, Mitchell Burgess (episode: "Irregular Around the Margins") | Nominated | |
| 2004 | Golden Globe Awards | Best Drama Series | | Nominated | |
| 2004 | Golden Globe Awards | Best Actress in a Drama Series | Edie Falco | Nominated | |
| 2004 | Golden Globe Awards | Best Supporting Actor – Television | Michael Imperioli | Nominated | |
| 2004 | Golden Globe Awards | Best Supporting Actress – Television | Drea de Matteo | Nominated | |
| 2004 | Screen Actors Guild Awards | Outstanding Ensemble in a Drama Series | Entire Cast | Nominated | |
| 2004 | Screen Actors Guild Awards | Outstanding Actor in a Drama Series | James Gandolfini | Nominated | |
| 2004 | Screen Actors Guild Awards | Outstanding Actress in a Drama Series | Edie Falco | Nominated | |
| 2004 | Screen Actors Guild Awards | Outstanding Actress in a Drama Series | Drea de Matteo | Nominated | |
| 2004 | Directors Guild of America Awards | Outstanding Directing for a Drama Series | John Patterson (episode: "All Due Respect") | Nominated | |
| 2004 | Directors Guild of America Awards | Outstanding Directing for a Drama Series | Tim Van Patten (episode: "Long Term Parking") | Nominated | |
| 2004 | Writers Guild of America Awards | Best Drama Episode | Terrence Winter (episode: "Long Term Parking") | Nominated | |
| 2004 | TCA Awards | Outstanding Achievement in Drama | | Won | |
| 2004 | TCA Awards | Program of the Year | | Nominated | |
| 2004 | TCA Awards | Outstanding Individual Achievement in Drama | James Gandolfini | Nominated | |
| 2004 | TCA Awards | Outstanding Individual Achievement in Drama | Edie Falco | Nominated | |
