= All Happy Families... =

- The Sopranos episode
- Episode no.: Season 5 Episode 4
- Directed by: Rodrigo García
- Written by: Toni Kalem
- Cinematography by: Alik Sakharov
- Production code: 504
- Original air date: March 28, 2004
- Running time: 52 minutes

Episode chronology
← Previous "Where's Johnny?"	Next → "Irregular Around the Margins"
- The Sopranos season 5

"All Happy Families..." is the 56th episode of the HBO original series The Sopranos and the fourth of the show's fifth season. Written by Toni Kalem and directed by Rodrigo García, it originally aired on March 28, 2004 and was the most-watched program on U.S. cable television for the week.

== Starring ==
- James Gandolfini as Tony Soprano
- Lorraine Bracco as Jennifer Melfi
- Edie Falco as Carmela Soprano
- Michael Imperioli as Christopher Moltisanti
- Dominic Chianese as Corrado Soprano, Jr. *
- Steven Van Zandt as Silvio Dante
- Tony Sirico as Paulie Gualtieri
- Robert Iler as Anthony Soprano, Jr.
- Jamie-Lynn DiScala as Meadow Soprano
- Drea de Matteo as Adriana La Cerva
- Aida Turturro as Janice Soprano Baccalieri *
- John Ventimiglia as Artie Bucco
- Steve Buscemi as Tony Blundetto

* = credit only

=== Guest starring ===
- Jerry Adler as Hesh Rabkin

==== Also guest starring ====
- Ray Abruzzo as Little Carmine Lupertazzi
- Chris Caldovino as Billy Leotardo
- Patti D'Arbanville as Lorraine Calluzzo
- Frank Fortunato as Jason Evanina
- Robert Loggia as Feech La Manna
- Joe Maruzzo as Joey "Peeps"
- John Pleshette as Dr. Ira Fried
- Joe Santos as Angelo Garepe
- David Strathairn as Robert Wegler
- Frankie Valli as Rusty Millio
- Frank Vincent as Phil Leotardo
- Joseph R. Gannascoli as Vito Spatafore
- Carl Capotorto as Little Paulie Germani
- Max Casella as Benny Fazio
- Peter Bogdanovich as Dr. Elliot Kupferberg
- Will Janowitz as Finn DeTrolio
- Dennis Aloia as Justin Blundetto
- Kevin Aloia as Jason Blundetto
- Cameron Boyd as Matt Testa
- Michael Pemberton as Supervisor Jimmy Curran
- John Marinacci as Dealer
- Adam Rose as Todd
- Stewart J. Zully as Alan Ginsberg
- Cal Robertson as Andrew
- Terence Winter as Tom Amberson
- Leon Wieseltier as Stewart Silverman
- David Lee Roth as himself
- Lawrence Taylor as himself
- Gina Lynn as Stripper
- Bernie Brillstein as himself
- John Lanzillotto as Mook
- Vincenzo Ameruoso as Carl 'Fat Carl' Carlo

== Synopsis ==
In New York, Lorraine and Jason are murdered by Billy and Joey Peeps after they refuse to give their collections to Johnny. Little Carmine is advised by fellow capo Rusty Millio to take aggressive action. Tony advises his capos and soldiers not to get involved in the New York feud.

Feech comes in to see Tony and regales the younger mobsters with stories from his criminal career, including one when Tony and Jackie Aprile, Sr established themselves by robbing his card game. Tony laughs at this, but Feech asks if he can run the game once again. Tony allows him to supervise it and get 20% of its profits. At the card game, Feech's jokes and anecdotes annoy Tony but generate uproarious laughter from his crew. In an argument, Carmela has told Tony that he has no friends, just "flunkies" who curry favor and laugh at his stupid jokes because he is the boss. As a test, Tony makes a feeble joke to the card-players and observes their overly hearty laughter.

Feech's hired men carjack the guests at the wedding of the daughter of Ira Fried, a close friend of Tony's, and sell the vehicles to men working for Johnny Sack. Tony then recalls the joke he told at the card game and realizes the only person not laughing was Feech. He reluctantly decides that Feech, although well-liked and respected, has to be dealt with. Tony sends Christopher and Benny to Feech's house, where they trick him into hiding a truckload of flatscreen TVs in his garage in return for payment, plus a TV for himself. The following day, a corrupt parole officer working for Tony visits Feech and asks about the flatscreen in his living room, then asks to see his garage; Feech has to comply. On the bus back to prison, he gazes at the outside world.

Dr. Melfi finds that Tony has left a basket of expensive toiletries and a bathrobe in her waiting room. Later, stressing the misspelled words, she reads his gift card to her own therapist, Dr. Kupferberg. Tony apologizes for his outburst during their last session. Kupferberg tells Melfi the gift represents ablution.

A.J. is having a difficult time in school and disrespects Carmela. She and Tony visit A.J.'s guidance counselor, Robert Wegler. Carmela partly blames A.J.'s poor academic performance on her separation from Tony. Tony buys A.J. a new Nissan Xterra as a "motivational tool" to get better grades, saying that Carmela will keep the keys until his grades improve.

A.J. asks his mother if he can attend a Mudvayne concert in New York with friends. Carmela agrees on the condition that he spend the night at Meadow's apartment; however, A.J. calls Meadow to tell her that he will not be coming, and she reluctantly agrees to cover for him.

Staying in a hotel, A.J. and his friends get drunk and high. The next morning, A.J. wakes with his face glued to the carpet, and his eyebrows shaved off and redrawn with a permanent marker. In the ensuing argument at home, A.J. sells a false story, which Tony appears willing to buy. Carmela blames herself for A.J.'s actions and says Tony should take A.J. to live with him. At Tony's, A.J. bonds with his father, Tony B, and Artie as they watch TV until Tony sends him upstairs to do his homework.

Wegler invites Carmela to lunch. She discusses A.J.'s troubles as well as her own. He recommends that she read Gustave Flaubert's novel Madame Bovary, noting parallels between Carmela and the book's protagonist. She returns to the empty family house.

== First appearances ==
- Rusty Millio: A capo in the Lupertazzi family and ally of Little Carmine.
- Robert Wegler: A.J.'s school guidance counselor who also goes out with Carmela for lunch.
- Justin and Jason Blundetto: The twin sons of Tony Blundetto.

== Final appearances ==
- Michele "Feech" LaManna: Is sent back to prison on a parole violation by Tony.

== Deceased ==
- Lorraine Calluzzo: shot by Billy Leotardo on orders from Johnny Sack for not kicking up direct to him.
- Jason Evanina: shot on orders from Johnny Sack, presumably by Billy Leotardo or Joey Peeps.

== Title reference ==
- The title is a paraphrase of first part of the opening line of Anna Karenina by Leo Tolstoy. The full quotation is "Happy families are all alike; every unhappy family is unhappy in its own way".

== Production ==
- The episode's script was written by Toni Kalem, who also plays Angie Bonpensiero, and serves as story editor on several episodes of season five.
- The character of Ira Fried was recast in this episode with actor John Pleshette. The role was initially played by Lewis J. Stadlen.
- This is the first time that singer Frankie Valli portrays Lupertazzi capo Rusty Millio. Valli himself was mentioned before—in the season four episode "Christopher"—and had his songs played in some episodes.
- Bernie Brillstein, who plays himself at the card game, is the business partner of Sopranos executive producer Brad Grey. Also appearing in the card game is former New York Giants linebacker Lawrence Taylor (whom Tony refers to, in reverence, as "Sir Lawrence of the Meadowlands") and, in a separate card game, Van Halen vocalist David Lee Roth.
- Leon Wieseltier, longtime literary editor of The New Republic, plays car-theft victim Stewart Silverman.

== Music ==
- Edison Lighthouse's "Love Grows (Where My Rosemary Goes)" is played in the background, probably on a radio, while Lorraine is murdered.
- The Starlight Orchestra performs "Siman Tov! Mazel Tov!" during the Horah at the wedding reception.
- As Tony and Carmela see Mr. Wegler about A.J., Tony asks what A.J. did: "Did he call the teacher 'Daddy-O'?" This was based on a line from The Coasters song, "Charlie Brown".
- One scene in the Bada Bing features The Cars' "Moving in Stereo".
- In the scene where Tony is arguing with Feech, Jimi Hendrix's "Who Knows" is playing in the background throughout the scene.
- As A.J. and his friends smoke marijuana in the hotel room, "Trouble" by West Coast rapper Roscoe is playing in the background.
- The music played over the end credits is "La Petite Mer" by Thierry Robin.
- "Beat Connection" by LCD Soundsystem is playing in a scene set in the Crazy Horse.
- "Nobody Loves and Leaves Alive" by Little Steven and the Lost Boys (real-life band of Steven van Zandt) is the song silently pointed out to Tony by Silvio when it is playing in the Crazy Horse.

== Reception ==
For the week ending March 28, 2004, "All Happy Families..." had 9.69 million viewers, the most for that week on U.S. cable television.

Television Without Pity graded this episode with an A−.

Franco Ricci, professor of Italian studies at the University of Ottawa, found "biting irony" in Carmela watching a scene in the film Frida of the lead character expressing continued love towards an estranged husband, while Carmela remains separated from Tony. In other scenes, Meadow and Finn watch the same film in their apartment, while A.J. and his friends watch pornography in their hotel room, leading Ricci to conclude: "...love is in the air everywhere in Sopranoland. But Carmela is not part of the reverie."
