= Irregular Around the Margins =

- The Sopranos episode
- Episode no.: Season 5 Episode 5
- Directed by: Allen Coulter
- Written by: Robin Green; Mitchell Burgess
- Cinematography by: Phil Abraham
- Production code: 505
- Original air date: April 4, 2004
- Running time: 52 minutes

Episode chronology
← Previous "All Happy Families..."	Next → "Sentimental Education"
- The Sopranos season 5

"Irregular Around the Margins" is the 57th episode of the HBO original series The Sopranos and the fifth episode of the show's fifth season. Written by Robin Green and Mitchell Burgess, and directed by Allen Coulter, it originally aired on April 4, 2004.

This episode was praised by critics for the acting of Drea de Matteo as Adriana La Cerva and the character development of La Cerva, as the story had the deepest role for La Cerva in the series to date.

== Starring ==
- James Gandolfini as Tony Soprano
- Lorraine Bracco as Dr. Jennifer Melfi
- Edie Falco as Carmela Soprano
- Michael Imperioli as Christopher Moltisanti
- Dominic Chianese as Corrado Soprano, Jr.
- Steven Van Zandt as Silvio Dante
- Tony Sirico as Paulie Gualtieri
- Robert Iler as Anthony Soprano, Jr.
- Jamie-Lynn DiScala as Meadow Soprano
- Drea de Matteo as Adriana La Cerva
- Aida Turturro as Janice Soprano Baccalieri *
- Steven R. Schirripa as Bobby Baccalieri
- Kathrine Narducci as Charmaine Bucco
- Steve Buscemi as Tony Blundetto

* = credit only

=== Guest starring ===
- Jerry Adler as Hesh Rabkin

==== Also guest starring ====
- Max Casella as Benny Fazio
- Joseph R. Gannascoli as Vito Spatafore
- Robert Funaro as Eugene Pontecorvo
- Lola Glaudini as Agent Deborah Ciccerone-Waldrup
- Dan Grimaldi as Patsy Parisi
- Will Janowitz as Finn De Trolio
- Hill Harper as Stokley Davenport, MD
- Anthony Ribustello as Dante Greco
- Frank Vincent as Phil Leotardo
- Tony Siragusa as Frankie Cortese
- Joe Maruzzo as Joey "Peeps"
- Duke Valenti as Corky DiGioia
- Karen Young as Agent Sanseverino
- Rae Allen as Quintina Blundetto
- Frank Pellegrino as Bureau Chief Frank Cubitoso
- Frank Pando as Agent Grasso
- William DeMeo as Jason Molinaro

== Synopsis ==
Tony has a mole removed, later determined to be a squamous skin cancer. Adriana is being treated for irritable bowel syndrome caused by stress. Tony spends more time at her club and, with Christopher traveling to North Carolina on a cigarette smuggling job, is alone with her in her office. The two bond over recent problems and snort cocaine together. The mood becomes intimate; they nearly kiss, but are interrupted. The incident compels Tony to resume his psychiatric therapy. He tells Dr. Melfi that a relationship with Adriana would lead to problems with both Chris and Carmela. Melfi commends Tony not taking an action that would have harmful consequences, calling it a breakthrough in his therapy.

Late at night on the eve of Chris's return, Tony and Adriana drive to Dover to buy cocaine. Tony swerves to avoid a raccoon, and his SUV flips over to the driver's side. Tony is released from the hospital unhurt. Adriana is bruised and has a head injury. Tony suggests a cover story to explain why they were alone together in the early morning: they were going to get something to eat. However, Tony's crew and their associates play an unintentional game of "telephone" with the story of the accident. The details get more elaborate and lurid with each retelling; the final version is that Adriana was fellating Tony when the accident occurred.

Chris learns of the accident from his crew upon his return from North Carolina and quickly becomes suspicious. At Satriale's, he loses his temper and nearly starts a fight with Vito, who is now a capo. At a face-to-face meeting, Tony turns the conversation against Chris, saying that Chris does not deserve a woman as good-looking as Adriana. Tony swears on his children that the rumors of their affair are untrue. At home, Adriana admits to Chris that she and Tony were going to see her drug dealer but insists that nothing happened between them. Chris batters her and physically throws her out. He then relapses with a bottle of vodka.

A drunken Chris arrives at the Bing and empties his pistol into Tony's car. He enters the club shouting threats to Tony and brandishing the empty gun, but is easily overpowered. Tony and the crew drive him to the Meadowlands, where Tony prepares to execute him if he doesn't acknowledge that nothing happened between Tony and Adriana. At Tony B's suggestion, Chris is taken to the doctor who treated Tony and Adriana on the night of the accident. Though they are threatening him, the doctor freely acknowledges that Adriana's injuries show that she was wearing her seat belt and sitting upright when the accident occurred. Chris appears to be placated but says that he feels like a laughing stock.

Agent Sanseverino still believes that Adriana and Tony have some sort of sexual relationship in spite of Adriana's insistence otherwise. Meeting in a car, she tells Adriana she wants to exploit the supposed relationship by planting listening devices in her club. This infuriates Adriana, who moves to go. As she is leaving, Sanseverino tries to warn her that by staying with Chris she is protecting her abuser. Adriana fiercely defends Christopher by retorting that "had Christopher been alone in a car with a woman" she would have killed him.

Tony convinces Carmela that there is nothing between him and Adriana. In a show of unity, Tony and Carmela, Chris and Adriana, and Tony B and Quintina Blundetto dine at Nuovo Vesuvio, where most of Tony's crew are eating at other tables. Vito approaches them and shakes Chris's hand, wishing him a pleasant evening, resolving the tension between them.

== Production ==
- Tony's burgundy 1999 Chevy Suburban is seen for the last time in this episode (he was last seen driving it in the closing scene of the season 4 finale). He had upgraded to a black Cadillac Escalade at the beginning of season 5 (and drives/is driven in a white 2003 Escalade after crashing his previous Escalade from the middle of this season onwards).

== First appearances ==
- Frankie Cortese: a soldier in the Soprano family. He is one of the two bodyguards who subdued Christopher when he comes into the Bada Bing to confront Tony
- Jason Molinaro: a member of the Aprile crew

== Title reference ==
- Tony tells Adriana that he's afraid a mole on his shoulder looks "irregular around the margins," a worry he's had ever since a cancerous mole was removed from his forehead. Well-defined borders typically indicate a benign growth, while melanomas have borders that are not well defined.
- The title alludes to the season's theme of financial difficulties.

== Awards ==
- Allen Coulter was nominated for the Primetime Emmy Award for Outstanding Directing for a Drama Series for his work on this episode.
- Mitchell Burgess and Robin Green were nominated for the Primetime Emmy Award for Outstanding Writing for a Drama Series for their work on this episode.
- Drea de Matteo won the Primetime Emmy Award for Outstanding Supporting Actress in a Drama Series for her performance in this episode.
- Michael Imperioli won the Primetime Emmy Award for Outstanding Supporting Actor in a Drama Series for his performance in this episode.

== Music ==
- The song that plays during the meeting in the Crazy Horse, when Adriana comes in, is "Beat Connection" from LCD Soundsystem.
- The song that plays while Tony and Adriana use cocaine at the Crazy Horse is "Come for Me" by Little Steven and the Lost Boys. The band's singer, Steven Van Zandt, plays Silvio Dante on the show.
- The music that plays during the final restaurant scene and over the closing credits is the aria, "Chi il bel sogno di Doretta?", from La rondine, an opera by Giacomo Puccini sung by Luba Orgonasova. The same aria was used in the pilot episode, when Tony got his first panic attack at the moment the ducks left his pool. The song describes a woman who rejects a king as a suitor in favor of a student.

== Reception ==
"Irregular Around the Margins" was the most-watched show in its timeslot, with a 5.2 Nielsen rating and 13 share.

Television Without Pity graded "Irregular Around the Margins" with an A+. In a preview of this episode, Deborah Sontag of The New York Times described it as putting Drea de Matteo, playing Adriana La Cerva, "front and center, underscoring how crucial her character's conflicted evolution has become." For The Star-Ledger, Alan Sepinwall regarded this episode among the best Sopranos episodes, especially about the plot device of rumors spreading about Tony and Adriana: "Who knew a game of telephone could have such consequences? And who knew Drea de Matteo was this good?" Sepinwall also observed about the rumor plot: "...made men can gossip just as much...as the women in their lives".

In a 2020 essay, Hannah McGill ranked "Irregular Around the Margins" as "the number one tip-top objectively best episode of The Sopranos", for its writing and "extraordinary capacity of the actors".
