= Patti D'Arbanville =

American actress (born 1951)

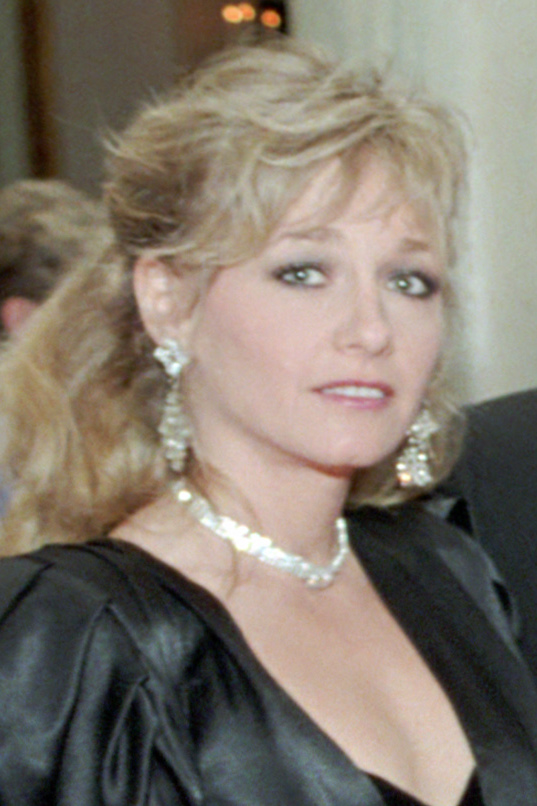
- D'Arbanville in 1985
- Born: Patricia D'Arbanville; May 25, 1951 (age 75); New York City, U.S.
- Occupation: Actress
- Years active: 1967–present
- Spouses: Roger Miremont (m. 1975; div. 1980) Steve Curry (m. 1980; div. 1981) Terry Quinn (m. 1993; div. 2002)
- Partner: Don Johnson (1981–1985)
- Children: 4, including Jesse

Patricia "Patti" D'Arbanville (born May 25, 1951) is an American actress known for her appearance in Andy Warhol projects.

== Career ==
After appearing in Flesh (1968), D'Arbanville performed in Warhol's L'Amour (1973), and as the title character in the David Hamilton film Bilitis (1977).

D'Arbanville has worked in film and television series in the United States and France, including her role as Lt. Virginia Cooper on the Fox series New York Undercover.

== Personal life ==
In the late 1960s, when she was a model in London, D'Arbanville met and developed a romance with singer and songwriter Cat Stevens. She was the inspiration for his 1970 song "Lady D'Arbanville".

D'Arbanville left Stevens for periods of time to continue her modeling career in Paris and New York City, and was a part of Warhol's Factory scene. In an interview with Warhol, she said that she had heard the song "Lady D'Arbanville":

Stevens wrote that song "Lady D'Arbanville" when I left for New York. I left for a month, it wasn't the end of the world was it? But he wrote this whole song about "Lady D'Arbanville, why do you sleep so still." It's about me dead. So while I was in New York, for him it was like I was lying in a coffin... He wrote that because he missed me, because he was down... It's a sad song.

D'Arbanville later had a relationship with actor Don Johnson from 1981 to 1985. The couple had a son, Jesse Wayne Johnson (born December 7, 1982).

D'Arbanville has been married and divorced three times. She lived in France for 10 years, becoming fluent in French, and was married to French actor Roger Miremont, then known as Roger Mirmont, from August 1, 1975, to 1980. She was married to Steve Curry from April 26, 1980, to 1981. She was then married to former New York City firefighter Terry Quinn from June 15, 1993, to March 12, 2002. They have three children.

== Filmography ==
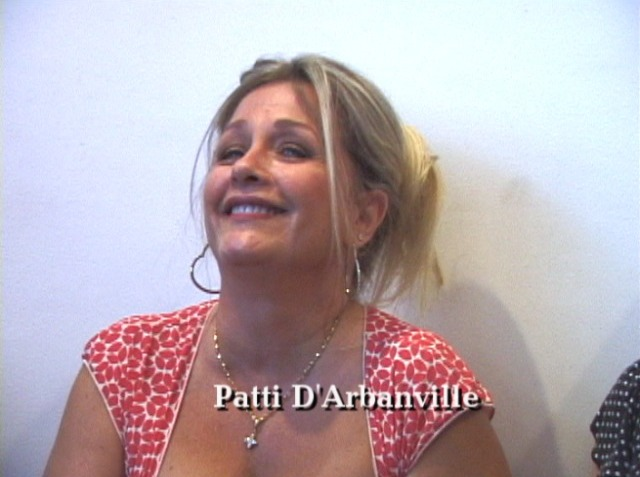
D'Arbanville in 2007

=== Film ===
| Year | Title | Role | Notes |
|---|---|---|---|
| 1968 | Flesh | Patti | |
| 1970 | The House | Lorraine | |
| 1971 | The Blood Letting | Hillary | |
| 1973 | L'Amour | Patti | |
| 1975 | Rancho Deluxe | Betty Fargo | |
| 1977 | Bilitis | Bilitis | |
| 1977 | La fille d'Amérique | Ronni Williams | |
| 1978 | Big Wednesday | Sally Jacobson | |
| 1978 | The Fifth Floor | Cathy | |
| 1979 | The Main Event | Donna | |
| 1979 | Time After Time | Shirley | |
| 1980 | Hog Wild | Angie Barnes | |
| 1981 | Modern Problems | Darcy Carson | |
| 1985 | Real Genius | Sherry Nugil | |
| 1985 | The Boys Next Door | Angie | |
| 1988 | Call Me | Cori | |
| 1988 | Fresh Horses | Jean | |
| 1989 | Wired | Cathy Smith | |
| 1994 | Frame-Up II: The Cover-Up | Barbara Griffin | |
| 1996 | The Fan | Ellen Renard | |
| 1997 | Fathers' Day | Shirley Trainor | |
| 1998 | Archibald the Rainbow Painter | Elaine Tiger | |
| 1998 | Celebrity | Iris | |
| 2002 | Personal Velocity: Three Portraits | Celia | |
| 2003 | A Tale of Two Pizzas | Margie Bianco | |
| 2006 | World Trade Center | Donna's Friend | |
| 2007 | Perfect Stranger | Esmeralda | |
| 2007 | You Belong to Me | Gladys | |
| 2008 | The Marconi Bros. | Sonya Weitzman | |
| 2010 | The Extra Man | Katherine Hart | |
| 2010 | Morning Glory | Mrs. Fuller, Becky's mother | |

=== Television ===
| Year | Title | Role | Notes |
|---|---|---|---|
| 1976 | Once an Eagle | Michele | TV miniseries: Part 1 |
| 1977 | Code R | Maggie | Season 1 Episode 2: "The Great Boat Race" |
| 1978 | The Eddie Capra Mysteries | Nancy Sinclair | Season 1 Episode 1: "Where There's Smoke" |
| 1980 | Barnaby Jones | Jessica Collins | Season 8 Episode 12: "Run to Death" |
| 1980 | Charlie's Angels | Bianca | Season 5 Episode 3: "Angels of the Deep" |
| 1982 | Darkroom | Babette | Season 1 Episode 13: "Guillotine" |
| 1984 | Murder, She Wrote | Leslie Andler | Season 1 Episode 6: "Hit, Run and Homicide" |
| 1985 | Miami Vice | Mrs. Stone | Season 2 Episode 10: "Back in the World" |
| 1986 | Crime Story | Eve Vollesky | Season 1 Episode 2: "Final Transmission" |
| 1988 | Crossing the Mob | Lucy Conte | TV movie |
| 1988 | Midnight Caller | Jordan | Season 1 Episode 4: "Payback" |
| 1989 | Wiseguy | Amber Twine / Theresa Demante | Recurring role in 13 credited episodes |
| 1990 | Snow Kill | Lauren Crane | TV movie |
| 1992 | Law & Order | Betty Drake | Season 3 Episode 5: "Wedded Bliss" |
| 1992–1993 | Another World | Christy Carson | Three episodes dated (1) 23 October 1992; (2) 23 December 1992; (3) 13 May 1993 |
| 1993 | Blind Spot | Lucinda | TV movie |
| 1993 | South Beach | Roxanne | Four episodes: (1) Season 1 Episode 1: "Diamond in the Rough"; (2) Season 1 Episode 2: "Pirates of the Caribbean"; (3) Season 1 Episode 3: "Stake Out"; (4) Season 1 Episode 5 "Wild Thing" |
| 1994 | The John Larroquette Show | Big Linda | Season 1 Episode 15: "Death and Dishonor" |
| 1994 | L.A. Law | Caroline Hardy | Season 8 Episode 18: "Dead Issue" |
| 1994 | My So-Called Life | Amber Vallon | Three episodes: (1) Season 1 Episode 3: "Guns & Gossip"; (2) Season 1 Episode 10: "Other People's Mothers"; (3) Season 1 Episode 14: "On the Wagon" |
| 1994–1997 | New York Undercover | Lieutenant Virginia Cooper | Main role in 76 credited episodes |
| 1997 | Bad to the Bone | Marilyn Wells | TV movie |
| 1998 | Homicide: Life on the Street | Darlene Everett | Season 7 Episode 4: "The Twenty Percent Solution" |
| 1998–2000 | Guiding Light | Selena Davis | |
| 2000–2005 | Third Watch | Rose Boscorelli | Recurring role in 16 credited episodes |
| 2003 | The Division | Maggie | Season 3 Episode 8: "The Cost of Freedom" |
| 2003 | Nip/Tuck | Wallace Forsythe | Season 1 Episode 4: "Sofia Lopez" |
| 2004 | The Sopranos | Lorraine Calluzzo | Three Episodes: (1) Season 5 Episode 2: "Rat Pack"; (2) Season 5 Episode 3: "Where's Johnny?"; (3) Season 5 Episode 4: "All Happy Families..." |
| 2005 | Wild Card | Kathy | Season 2 Episode 14: "See Ya Later, Investigator!" |
| 2006–2010 | Rescue Me | Ellie | Recurring role in 14 credited episodes |
| 2007 | Law & Order: Criminal Intent | Cecilia | Season 6 Episode 11: "World's Fair" |
| 2007 | Eyes | Dee Dee McCann | Season 1 Episode 12: "Investigator" |
| 2017 | The Sinner | Lorna Tanetti | Five credited episodes: Part I, Part II, Part III, Part V, Part VIII as "Mason Tanetti's Mother" |
| 2018-2020 | Billions | Mama Axelrod | Three credited episodes: (1) Season 3 Episode 10: "Redemption" (2018); (2) Season 3 Episode 11: "Kompenso" (2018); (3) Season 5 Episode 5: "Contract" (2020) |
