= Frank Albanese =

American actor (1931–2015)

- Born: May 16, 1931; Staten Island, New York, U.S.
- Died: October 5, 2015 (aged 84); Staten Island, New York, U.S.
- Occupation: Actor

Frank Albanese (May 16, 1931 – October 5, 2015) was an American actor known for playing mobsters, notably on the HBO hit series The Sopranos as Uncle Patrizio Blundetto. He also appeared in gangster films like Goodfellas. In the film The Godfather: Part III, he appeared as the Grand Marshal of the St. Gennaro Feast at the head of the street parade procession.

He was born in West Brighton, Staten Island, New York and died there in Egbertville, Staten Island, on October 5, 2015, from prostate cancer. He grew up in Manhattan but lived in Bay Terrace, Staten Island for most of his adult life.

== Filmography ==
Year	Title	Role	Notes
1971	Plaza Suite	Parking Lot Attendant	Uncredited
1972	The Godfather	Tattaglia's Assassin	Uncredited
1990	Goodfellas	Mob Lawyer	
1990	The Godfather: Part III	Grand Marshal at St. Gennaro Feast	Uncredited
1995	Dead Presidents	Mr. Gianetti	
2005	Rose Woes and Joe's	Italian Speaking Customer	
2007	Mattie Fresno and the Holoflux Universe	Frail Old Doctor	
2008	Meatballs, Tomatoes and Mobsters	Uncle Rizzo	
2010	Old Secrets No Lies	Pepino	
2010	Shake Road	Pops	
