= Vincent Curatola =

American actor (born 1953)

- Born: August 16, 1953 (age 72); Englewood, New Jersey, U.S.
- Occupation: Actor
- Years active: 1991–present

Vincent Curatola (/ˌkjʊrəˈtoʊlə/; born August 16, 1953) is an American actor. Curatola is best known for his portrayal of New York mafioso Johnny Sack from the HBO drama The Sopranos. He is also a singer and has appeared onstage several times with the band Chicago.

== Personal life ==
Of Italian-American descent, Curatola was born in and grew up in Englewood, New Jersey, where his boyhood paper route allowed him to meet many performers. By 2007, he had moved to Saddle River, New Jersey. He sings and plays guitar, and occasionally performs with the band Chicago.

== Career ==
Before his acting career, Curatola worked as masonry contractor. At his wife's suggestion, he studied acting in the early 1990s and began getting occasional acting roles, including in the series Law & Order. Towards the end of the decade, he appeared in productions such as Gotti (1996), and Exiled (1998). He then landed a regular role in the drama series The Sopranos as New York mobster Johnny Sack. He played the role for all six seasons from 1999 to 2007 and was nominated for a SAG Award twice for it. Curatola's later credits include The Good Wife, Blue Bloods, The Blacklist, Person of Interest, Law & Order: SVU, and the 2012 film Killing Them Softly. He has also taught acting.

== Politics ==
In 2007, Curatola appeared in a The Sopranos parody advertisement for Hillary Clinton's 2008 presidential exploratory committee, alongside Hillary and Bill Clinton. In 2009, Curatola was named to the Gaming, Sports, and Entertainment subcommittee transition team of then Governor-elect Chris Christie of New Jersey.

== Filmography ==
=== Film ===
Year	Title	Role	Notes
1995	Dearly Beloved	Francis Leone	Short film
1996	Gotti	Associate	
2000	Hot Ice	—N/a	
2003	I Am Woody	Dr. Weeble	Short film
2004	2BPerfectlyHonest	Dr. Platter	
2005	The Signs of the Cross	—N/a	
2005	Meet the Mobsters	Mr. Samantha	
2005	Fun with Dick and Jane	Dick's Neighbor	Uncredited
2007	Made in Brooklyn	Judge/State trooper	
2009	The Hungry Ghosts	Nicky Z	
2009	Frame of Mind	Lt. John Mangione	
2009	Karma, Confessions and Holi	Asa Taft	
2012	Killing Them Softly	Johnny Amato	
2016	Patriots Day	Mayor Thomas Menino	

=== Television ===
Year	Title	Role	Notes
1991	Law & Order	Court Clerk	Episode: "Aria"
1998	Exiled: A Law & Order Movie	Detective No. 1	Television movie
1999–2007	The Sopranos	Johnny Sack	33 episodes
2000	Law & Order	Joey Dantoni Sr.	Episode: "Trade This"
2004	Third Watch	Anthony Boscorelli	4 episodes
2009	Life on Mars	Anthony Nunzio	Episode: "Take a Look at the Lawmen"
2009	Monk	Jimmy Barlowe	Episode: "Mr Monk Is Someone Else"
2009	Law & Order: Special Victims Unit	Marv Sulloway	Episode: "Ballerina"
2010	Law & Order: Criminal Intent	Anthony "Blev" Blevvins	Episode: "The Mobster Will See You Now"
2012	Person of Interest	Zambrano	Episode: "Flesh and Blood"
2013	Nicky Deuce	Paulie	Television movie
2013–2014	The Good Wife	Judge Thomas Politi	5 episodes
2014	Elementary	Theodore "Big Teddy" Ferrara	Episode: "All in the Family"
2014	Blue Bloods	Chief Norm Valenti	Episode: "Custody Battle"
2015–2019	Law & Order: Special Victims Unit	Judge Al Bertuccio	5 episodes
2016	The Blacklist	Danny Vacarro	Episode: "Alistair Pitt (No. 103)"
2020	FBI	Vargas	Episode: "Liar's Poker"

== Awards and nominations ==
Screen Actors Guild Award

- 2002: Nominated, "Outstanding Performance by an Ensemble in a Drama Series" – The Sopranos
- 2004: Nominated, "Outstanding Performance by an Ensemble in a Drama Series" – The Sopranos
