= Paulie Gualtieri =

Fictional character from The Sopranos

- The Sopranos character
- Tony Sirico as Paulie Gualtieri
- First appearance: "The Sopranos" (1999)
- Last appearance: The Many Saints of Newark (2021)
- Created by: David Chase
- Portrayed by: Tony Sirico; Billy Magnussen (The Many Saints of Newark)

In-universe information
- Full name: Peter Paul Gualtieri
- Aliases: Clarence; Ted Hughes; Mr. Walters
- Nickname: Paulie Walnuts
- Title: Soldier (seasons 1–2) Captain (seasons 2–6b)
- Occupation: Former waste management executive of Barone Sanitation "Professional Investor" as listed on his tax forms
- Family: Nucci Gualtieri (adoptive mother, biological aunt); Gerry Gualtieri (adoptive brother, biological cousin); Rose Gualtieri (adoptive sister, biological cousin)
- Relatives: Dottie (biological mother, "aunt"); Marianucci "Nucci" Gualtieri (aunt); Paulie Germani (adoptive nephew, biological cousin once-removed); Mary Gualtieri (aunt)
- Nationality: Italian-American

Peter Paul "Paulie Walnuts" Gualtieri is a fictional character portrayed by Tony Sirico on the HBO series The Sopranos, one of the chief henchmen of series protagonist Tony Soprano. Sirico auditioned for the role of Uncle Junior with Frank Vincent, but Dominic Chianese landed the role. David Chase instead offered him the role of Paulie Gualtieri and Sirico agreed under the condition that his character would not "become a rat". Paulie begins the series as a soldier, later becoming a captain in the DiMeo crime family. He is violent, impulsive, quick-witted, sarcastic and paranoid. Paulie is jovial and quick with a joke but is one of the most ruthless members of the family. Billy Magnussen portrays a young Paulie Gualtieri in the 2021 prequel film, The Many Saints of Newark. Paulie Walnuts is one of the most prominent characters in The Sopranos, and one of the viewers' favorites. Sirico's performance has received acclaim from critics and audiences.

== Background ==
According to The Sopranos: A Family History, Peter Paul "Paulie" Gualtieri, son of Gennaro Gualtieri (although Paulie's biological father was later revealed to be a World War II soldier named "Russ"), had been a troubled street kid in Roseville, Newark from the age of nine. He dropped out of school after the ninth grade and spent time in and out of juvenile correctional facilities during his early youth. When he was seventeen, he officially became an enforcer/bodyguard for Johnny Soprano. He later moved to West Orange, New Jersey as an adult.

Paulie's presumed father was a captain in the DiMeo crime family. His mother, later discovered to be his biological aunt, worked at a Kresge's department store during Paulie's childhood and early adulthood, but has since retired. Paulie's grandfather, who immigrated to the United States in 1910, is from Ariano, a municipality in the province of Avellino, in Italy's Campania region. Paulie's grandfather and Tony's paternal grandparents were from the same province in Italy.

Paulie spent four years in the U.S. Army Signal Corps, where he was eventually drummed out through Section 8 (discharged for psychiatric reasons). Afterward, he spent more time in and out of prison on various criminal charges. He eventually was inducted into the DiMeo crime family, becoming a close associate of Johnny Soprano and helping to mentor his son Tony.

His surname is taken from real-life DeCavalcante crime family mobster Frank Gualtieri, who served under Vincent Palermo. In the episode "From Where to Eternity", Paulie mentions to his parish priest after visiting a psychic that he had been donating to the parish for 23 years, meaning he had started donating in 1977. He helped pay for refurbishing his church's organ and paid for the new altar boy robes. He tells the priest he will stop contributing financially to the church following his incident with the psychic saying that he should have been protected.

Paulie is one of the show's most colorful characters, often cracking jokes or spouting bizarre sentiments. He is self-centered, opinionated, does not show much empathy, and can be paranoid at times. One of the older active gangsters in the family, Paulie adheres to traditional mob customs and ultimately shows loyalty and deference to his boss Tony. Other character traits include his competitiveness, miserliness, fear of germs, and indifference to violence.

Despite his seniority and successful earning, Paulie is one of the more eccentric and reckless of Tony's associates and is arguably the most ruthless. In the first season finale, "I Dream of Jeannie Cusamano," Tony tells his crew that he had been in therapy for almost a year when Paulie reveals that he too had seen a therapist, from whom he "learned some coping skills." Nevertheless, despite his personality flaws, Paulie is recognized throughout the series as one of the top earners and one of Tony's most trusted friends in his "inner circle". Although he is shown to be dating a couple of different women during the series, Paulie has no children and mostly remains single, devoting almost his entire life to being a gangster.

== Plot details ==
=== Season 1 ===
In the first season, Paulie is a vital member of Tony's crew. He executes a Colombian drug dealer and steals a large quantity of drugs and cash from his hotel room. Other tasks he performs are recovering a stolen car (with Salvatore "Big Pussy" Bonpensiero), torturing a hotel co-owner so the crew can own 25% of the business, and extorting Meadow's soccer coach by giving him an unwanted free TV. When suspicions that Big Pussy is an informant first surface, Paulie volunteers to investigate (and kill him if necessary). His method of taking Big Pussy to a bath house and trying to get him to undress for a steambath lacks subtlety and drives Big Pussy into hiding. In Tony's brief and bloody war with Corrado "Junior" Soprano's crew, following Junior's attempt on Tony's life, Paulie and Christopher are assigned the hit on Mikey Palmice, Junior's trusted right-hand man whom they gun down as he takes his morning jog.

=== Season 2 ===
With Tony now the family's street boss, while Junior remains boss only in name, Paulie is promoted to capo of Tony's old crew. This means that Big Pussy, Christopher, and (eventually) Furio Giunta, amongst others, report to him. To help set up the crew's stolen car distribution operation, Paulie travels with Tony and Chris to Italy. Paulie also helps run the "executive game," a high-stakes poker game. In the episode "From Where to Eternity", Christopher is in the hospital recovering from an assassination attempt by Matthew Bevilaqua and Sean Gismonte. Chris becomes clinically dead for a few minutes after his heart stops. While in his comatose state, he has a morphine-induced dream in which he visits Hell and sees his deceased father "Dickie" Moltisanti, his deceased former best friend Brendan Filone and Mikey Palmice, who had slain Brendan and who was in turn murdered by Paulie and Chris. Chris informs Tony and Paulie that Mikey had a message for them: "Three o'clock".

Paulie subsequently begins to have nightmares of being dragged to Hell. At the recommendation of his mistress, Paulie goes to see a medium in Nyack, New York. Much to Paulie's chagrin, the authenticity of the medium seems to be confirmed when he apparently begins communicating with people that Paulie has killed, with Mikey apparently giving details of his murder. Paulie remains unsettled and paranoid, as he also feels he is being haunted by Palmice and others he had murdered throughout his criminal life. However, a skeptical Tony informs him that it means nothing. Later in the season, when it is confirmed that Big Pussy was an informant for the FBI, Paulie accompanies Tony and Silvio Dante on their trip out on a boat to execute Big Pussy. Right before the execution is carried out, Paulie tells Big Pussy "you were like a brother to me," at which point Tony adds, "to all of us."

=== Season 3 ===
In the third season, Christopher often chafes under Paulie's leadership, particularly after Christopher becomes a made man in Paulie's crew. Paulie becomes more demanding of his regular payments and subjects Christopher to a humiliating random strip search for wires. Things get heated when Paulie and Patsy Parisi show up unexpectedly at Christopher's apartment to get a take of Christopher's loot. While meddling through a dresser drawer, Christopher observes Paulie sniffing Adriana's panties, about which he later complains to Tony, who chides Paulie.

Frictions between Paulie and Christopher culminate in "Pine Barrens" when Tony assigns Paulie and Chris the task of collecting a payment owed to Silvio by a Russian mobster named Valery. Paulie botches the simple assignment after he needlessly provokes Valery and they get into a fight at his apartment. Believing Valery is dead after Paulie chokes him with a lamp, they take Valery out into the Pine Barrens to dispose of him. Valery, who is later revealed to be a former Russian military commando, is still alive and knocks both Paulie and Christopher to the ground with a shovel. He escapes and leads Paulie and Christopher on a brief chase in the woods.

Paulie shoots Valery in the head. He and Christopher are unable to find the seemingly mortally wounded Valery, and the two are dumbfounded as to what happened to him. They look for him in the woods, but they lose their way. They become hungry, extremely cold, tired, and frustrated with each other. Later, a heated exchange prompts Christopher to pull his gun and threaten to kill Paulie. The next morning, they are rescued by Tony and Bobby Baccalieri. Due to the unusual circumstances, Tony forgives Paulie but tells him he will have to face any possible consequences of his failure.

=== Season 4 ===
Between the third and fourth seasons, Paulie is arrested in Youngstown, Ohio on a gun possession charge and incarcerated at the Northeast Ohio Correctional Center. Although no censure is rendered upon him, Paulie's separation from the family, combined with Ralphie's continued earning abilities, continues to erode his reputation and credibility in Tony's eyes.

During his four months in jail, he communicates with John "Johnny Sack" Sacramoni, the underboss of New York's Lupertazzi crime family, with Johnny tricking Paulie into feeding him valuable intelligence about Tony's activities by giving him the impression that Carmine Lupertazzi Sr. is interested in offering him a spot within the family. It is Paulie who tells Johnny that Ralph Cifaretto made a very insensitive joke regarding Ginny Sack's weight, which compels an infuriated Johnny to sanction a hit on Ralph that is called off at the last minute.

A party is thrown at the Bada Bing when Paulie is released, but his wavering loyalty only serves to accelerate his marginalization. Paulie, however, by the end of the season, realizes he had been duped by Johnny and that Carmine has never even heard of him, much less offered him a place in his family. Following this realization, Paulie once again devotes himself fully to Tony and the Soprano family, reclaiming his status as a top earner.

Paulie has always been devoted to his mother, Marianucci "Nucci" Gualtieri, whom he has watched over constantly. She is delighted when he first places her at Green Grove (in stark contrast to Livia Soprano's reaction), and Paulie also intercedes in her social problems with the other residents, going so far as to attack their relatives to ensure civility towards his mother.

He later learns that one of the women Nucci had trouble with, Minn Matrone, keeps all her cash in her home. Paulie breaks into Minn's home to try to steal this money, but she catches him in the act. When he fails to talk his way out of it, he suffocates her with a pillow. He gives the money to Tony, which restores his confidence in Paulie.

=== Season 5 ===
In the fifth season, Christopher and Paulie's bad blood resurfaces when Chris reiterates the story of the Pine Barrens incident to Vito Spatafore, Patsy Parisi, and Benny Fazio. The story starts out friendly, but after Chris embarrasses him in front of the guys, Paulie calls Christopher "Tony's little favorite." This leads to Christopher and Paulie almost starting a fight and later, Paulie tells the rest of the guys that it's over between the two of them. At comare night, Christopher refuses to pay for dinner, forcing Paulie to pay. At Satriale's the following morning, Paulie demands the money back, or else Christopher would begin paying points.

At another dinner in Atlantic City, Paulie tells everyone to choose whatever they want in order to inflate Christopher's bill. Tapped out, Christopher leaves a small tip and argues with Paulie in the parking lot until the waiter comes out to confront them. Christopher responds violently and throws a brick at him. The waiter collapses and goes into convulsions. Panicked, Paulie shoots the waiter and retrieves the $1,200 in cash before running away. Paulie later calls Christopher and they agreed to "bury the hatchet," and split the tab. While this seems to Christopher like a fair compromise, it essentially means that Paulie is profiting from the whole situation by only returning half of the cash he stole from the dead waiter.

Paulie also gets into a dispute with Michele "Feech" La Manna over their rival landscaping companies. Paulie and Feech both resort to violence, assaulting the other's gardeners. Paulie's competition with and antagonism of Feech serves to highlight Feech's insubordinate tendencies, which causes Tony to set Feech up to be returned to prison for a parole violation, making it easier for everyone.

=== Season 6 ===
==== Part I ====
Between the fifth and sixth seasons, Christopher is made Capo of Paulie's crew, with Paulie being elevated to underboss, albeit a nominal one. Paulie's reputation for withholding money from his payments "up the ladder" is observed in "Mayham." While Tony is in a coma, Paulie takes part in a heist with Vito that leads to a score of $1 million in Colombian drug money, which is to be divided up fairly in terms of percentage amongst Tony, Paulie, and Vito.

The heist resulted from a tip by Vito. Although they had agreed to split the acquisition, Paulie later tries to withhold some of Vito's share due to an injury he had received during the heist; Silvio has to mediate as acting boss, informing them that under the circumstances, Tony's share would be given to Carmela. Vito and Paulie are strongly reluctant to give Tony's share to Carmela, as they speculate Tony could potentially perish at any moment but in the end accept.

When Vito's homosexuality is later revealed, Paulie is outspoken in his condemnation and desire to see Vito killed. When Vito returns after months in hiding, Tony considers his proposal of setting up business in Atlantic City with Silvio in front of Paulie; Paulie remains quiet but leaves the room in apparent protest. Tony largely decides to have Vito killed because Paulie's attitude mirrors the lack of respect his underlings would feel for him letting Vito live free, although Phil Leotardo makes it a moot point when members of his family beat Vito to death.

In "The Fleshy Part of the Thigh," Paulie learns that his dying aunt Dotty, a Sisters of Christian Charity nun, was actually his mother. She had become impregnated by a soldier identified only as "Russ" during World War II. Nucci, the woman Paulie had thought of as his mother, is really his aunt who took him in as her own to hide the scandal. This news sends Paulie into an emotional tailspin, in the grips of which he severed his ties with Nucci and does not attend Dotty's funeral.

The episode ends with Paulie extorting $4,000 per month (the sum of Nucci's retirement home costs) from Jason Barone, the son of the late owner of the Barone Sanitation company, unbeknownst to Tony. Earlier, Paulie had witnessed Helen Barone meet with Tony to intercede on her son's behalf, and Tony promised that he would not be harmed; hearing this conversation leads Paulie to break down emotionally. This means that Little Paulie Germani is not his nephew, but his first cousin once removed, although he still refers to Little Paulie as his nephew.

In "The Ride", Paulie is responsible for organizing the annual festivities at the Feast of St. Elzear. Paulie had taken over running the festival from Johnny Boy Soprano upon his death and continues to try to run it for profit. In 2006, it proves a burden—the replacement priest, Father José, tries to renegotiate the payment the church would receive. Paulie refuses to pay, and Father José retaliates by refusing to allow St. Elzear's gold hat to be used in the festival.

The hat's absence is noticed and complained about by elder residents. Ride maintenance is another area where Paulie decides to cut corners to save money, which results in a malfunction while Bobby Baccalieri's family was on a ride. Janice receives minor neck injuries. Subsequently, this results in temporary bad blood between Paulie and Bobby which Tony orders to be resolved.

During the festival, Paulie is tested for prostate cancer because of an elevated PSA. With his recently unveiled uncertain parentage, there is no way of knowing if he was genetically predisposed to the disease or not. During a restless night awaiting his results, Paulie awakes at 3 a.m. and goes to the Bada Bing. There, he has a striking vision of the Virgin Mary hovering above the stage.

Paulie later visits Nucci at Green Grove, and they have a silent reconciliation. In "Moe N' Joe," Paulie tells Tony that he has been diagnosed with prostate cancer. The disease was apparently caught in an early stage, and Paulie undergoes radiation therapy. Paulie suggests that his luck at having been diagnosed early was a reward for good deeds in his life, and Tony agrees with him. He states in "Stage 5," that he beat cancer, after learning of Johnny Sack's death from lung cancer.

==== Part II ====
In "Remember When", Paulie and Tony leave for Miami to maintain a low profile whilst the FBI investigates the case of Tony's first murder victim, Willie Overall. On the trip and in Miami, Paulie begins to reminisce about his and Tony's youth, bringing up several violent incidents from their mutual past; Tony briefly contemplates killing him out of a fear that Paulie will inadvertently implicate one or both of them in a crime, but ultimately relents.

In "Walk Like a Man", Paulie's nephew, Little Paulie, is beaten by Christopher and thrown out a second-story window. A furious Paulie tears up Christopher's lawn with his car, leaving Christopher's wife shaken.

Later in the episode, the two seem to have made up and drink together at the Bada Bing. However, Paulie makes off-color remarks about Christopher's daughter, which cause an inebriated Chris to storm out and later kill his AA friend J.T. Dolan. In "Kennedy and Heidi", Paulie is left surprisingly grief-stricken when Christopher is killed, reflecting that their arguments over money and respect were trivial and that he should have been nicer to him in life.

Paulie is later "upstaged" when his aunt/adopted mother Nucci dies and her wake is under-attended because his friends are at Christopher's wake instead. In the final episode "Made in America", Tony asks Paulie to take over the old Aprile crew. At first, Paulie is hesitant because all the bad luck that had befallen that crew's previous capos, but changes his mind after clever persuasion from Tony. With an ongoing war between the New Jersey and New York crime families, Tony and Paulie attend a sit-down with the New York crew, who agree to a truce to end their war. Paulie is last seen on his own outside Satriale's, as the resident cat is nearby, both sunbathing.

== Gualtieri crew ==
When given control of the Soprano crew, Paulie oversees all of Tony's old business dealings, including the Paving Union, extorting drug dealers, the pump and dump scams, charging HMOs for fake MRI expenditures, fencing stolen cars, a phone card scam, gambling, loan sharking and the crew's front businesses: Barone Sanitation and Massarone Construction.

Throughout the series, other aspects of the crew's criminal activities develop or are revealed. These include control of the Joint Fitters Union, credit card hijacking, betting shops, cigarette smuggling, and protection rackets. Legitimate businesses include Pussy's auto body shop (now run by his wife Angie), and silent partner in a lawn care business. Paulie soon becomes Tony's biggest earner.

However, by the fourth season, Paulie's businesses hit a low point, especially in comparison to the Cifaretto and Barese crews. By the fifth season, Paulie's crew regains its position as one of the family's best earners. By the sixth season, Paulie's crew is one of the most powerful crews. However, prior to the beginning of season six Christopher Moltisanti is promoted to captain splitting off from Paulie's crew with the younger soldiers and associates. After Christopher's death, the soldiers and associates in his crew are transferred back to Paulie's crew.

== Murder victims ==
The following is a list of murders committed by or referenced to in the series by Paulie. He is depicted killing nine people, the largest total of any character on the show.

Victim
Victim	Year	Reason	Episode
Charles "Sonny" Pagano	before 1970	Paulie "made his bones" (performed his first contract/ordered killing) by murdering Pagano. The murder is never depicted, only referenced as happening over 30 years ago.	"From Where to Eternity"*
Gallegos	1999	Shot in the forehead by Paulie for operating a drug business within DiMeo family territory.	"A Hit Is a Hit"
Michael "Mikey Grab Bag" Palmice	1999	Executed in the woods by Paulie and Chris for conspiring with Junior to kill Tony and for killing Brendan Filone.	"I Dream of Jeannie Cusamano"
Salvatore "Big Pussy" Bonpensiero	2000	Killed on Tony's boat by Paulie, Silvio, and Tony for being an FBI informant.	"Funhouse"
Valery (Possible)	2001	Possibly killed for attacking Paulie and Chris. Apparently shot in the New Jersey Pine Barrens, his fate as depicted on the show is unknown, though David Chase has indicated that he wasn't in fact killed	"Pine Barrens"
Minn Matrone	2003	Suffocated with a pillow in her apartment after she caught him searching her bedroom for cash.	"Eloise"
Raoul the Waiter	2004	Shot by Paulie after suffering blunt force trauma from a brick thrown at his head by Chris after a brief argument with them.	"Two Tonys"
Colombian #1	2006	Shot in the neck by Paulie and Cary DiBartolo during an armed robbery.	"Mayham"
Colombian #2	2006	Shot in the chest by Cary DiBartolo and then stabbed by Paulie during an armed robbery.	"Mayham"

== Family tree ==
Russ	Dottie
Paulie Gualtieri

Gennaro Gualtieri
Gerry Gualtieri

Marianucci
Rose Gualtieri
Paulie Germani

Mary

- In "Commendatori," when Paulie still believes that Nucci is his mother, he mentions having two brothers and a sister. Only Gerry and Rose are mentioned by name in the series; one of the brothers is a doctor.
- In the series finale, Tony mentions a niece of Paulie's who has MS. Because it now is known that Paulie has no siblings, he is referring to one of his cousin's/"siblings'" children.

== Appearances in other media ==
Paulie appeared in a commercial for Aftonbladet, advertising that the tabloid was being sold with a free Sopranos DVD each week in 2009.
