= Silvio Dante =

Fictional character on the television series The Sopranos

- The Sopranos character
- Steven Van Zandt as Silvio Dante
- First appearance: "The Sopranos" (1999)
- Last appearance: The Many Saints of Newark (2021)
- Created by: David Chase
- Portrayed by: Steven Van Zandt; John Magaro (The Many Saints of Newark)

In-universe information
- Full name: Silvio Manfred Dante
- Nickname: Sil
- Title(s): Soldier (seasons 1–2); Consigliere (seasons 2–6b); Acting Boss (season 6a)
- Occupation: Part owner and manager of the Bada Bing! strip club
- Family: Beppo Dante (father; deceased)
- Spouses: Gabriella Dante
- Children: Heather Dante (daughter)
- Relatives: Nicky (cousin)
- Nationality: Italian-American

Silvio Manfred Dante is a fictional character on the HBO TV series The Sopranos, portrayed by Steven Van Zandt. He is the consigliere and right-hand man to Tony Soprano in the DiMeo crime family. John Magaro portrays a young Silvio Dante in the 2021 prequel film, The Many Saints of Newark.

== Character biography ==
According to The Sopranos: A Family History, Silvio was born in June 1957 in West Orange, New Jersey. His father was Joseph "Beppo" Dante, of Calabrian origin, a member of Knights of Columbus and mob soldier who was gunned down in 1959. Silvio was a childhood friend of Tony Soprano. His early criminal activity often involved Tony and Jackie Aprile Sr. His original career plan was to be a professional singer, but this dream never materialized.

Despite this, Silvio has maintained a connection to show business through ownership of numerous clubs in North Jersey over the years, and in backing aspiring young starlets who come up through his clubs. Silvio's support was instrumental in ensuring Tony took over as capo following the death of his father. Through his association with the Soprano crew, Silvio formed friendships with Salvatore "Big Pussy" Bonpensiero and Paulie "Walnuts" Gualtieri.

Silvio is one of Tony's more level-headed and strategic associates. Where many of Tony's men immediately become hot-headed and readily resort to violence, Silvio generally helps to mediate situations and gets along with everyone. He accompanies Tony to most of his "sit-downs"—formal meetings within the organization to resolve disputes. Because of this, Tony relies on Silvio to be a clear-headed thinker and someone he can trust.

It was Silvio who reported to Tony that Uncle Junior planned to murder Pussy Malanga in Artie Bucco's restaurant and who was later entrusted with starting the fire which would ensure the original Vesuvio's burnt down, therefore not ruining its reputation. In the short and bloody war of 1999 with the Junior Soprano crew, Silvio helped Tony to plan hits on Chucky Signore and Mikey Palmice and remained supportive when Tony revealed that he had been seeing a therapist.

Silvio is most often the one to quote Mafia rules and norms when a tough decision is to be made, even if he ends up disagreeing with Tony. Silvio's move to consigliere once Tony becomes acting boss seems completely natural. Silvio remains Tony's most reliable adviser and enforcer, only displaying his aggression in a small number of incidents. One such is when Fat Dom Gamiello makes a remark about the late Vito Spatafore, which implied that Carlo Gervasi was gay. An enraged Silvio attacked Fat Dom by hitting him in the back of the head with a handheld vacuum and then restraining his arms behind his back and weighing him down, which allowed Carlo to stab Dom repeatedly in the abdomen with a large kitchen knife. In poker, Silvio often becomes foul-mouthed and paranoid when he is on a losing streak. Silvio likes to do an impression of Al Pacino, specifically a scene from The Godfather Part III, which his friends find amusing.

Silvio's criminal interests include loan sharking and bookmaking but his day-to-day role is that of managing the Bada Bing, the most recent in a string of strip clubs that he has operated. "The Bing", as it is often referred to, is one of the crime family's major meeting spots, and doubles as a brothel. Silvio loves and cares about, and is a strong father to his teenage daughter Heather, whom he calls The Principessa. Silvio says that Heather disapproves of his profession, calling it "degrading to women".

When his daughter's and Meadow Soprano's paedophile soccer coach, Don Hauser, was found to be grooming and raping one of his young players, Silvio looked for vigilantism vengeance but followed Tony's decision to let the authorities arrest him. Apart from periodic instances of adultery—Christopher says during his intervention in "The Strong, Silent Type" that Silvio was "fucking every slut you got working in the place"—it can be said that he loves his wife, Gabriella Dante (played by Steven Van Zandt's real-life wife Maureen Van Zandt), very much.

Silvio has a long record of executing/murdering traitors throughout the show, including Jimmy Altieri at the end of season 1, Salvatore "Big Pussy" Bonpensiero in season 2 (in league with Tony and Paulie), and Adriana La Cerva in season 5. All were killed when they were discovered to have been cooperating—or, in the case of Altieri, suspected to have been cooperating—with the FBI in their ongoing investigation of the Soprano crime family. Like Tony and Paulie, Bonpensiero's killing haunted Silvio. In Season 6, Silvio also carries out the execution of Burt Gervasi, garroting him after he discovers that he had been working with the Lupertazzi crime family.

Silvio's judgment wavered when he realized Tony was positioning Christopher Moltisanti as an intermediary between himself and the rest of the organization because of Christopher's and Tony's blood ties. This was made most apparent when Paulie was arrested on a gun charge and Tony made Christopher acting capo status of his crew in Paulie's absence. Silvio responded by encouraging Gualtieri crew soldier Patsy Parisi to steal from the Esplanade construction site against Tony's and Christopher's orders.

Silvio also became embroiled in a conflict with Native American protesters over a Columbus Day celebration—something Tony saw as a distraction—and went so far as to get many of the family's associates involved in a violent altercation with the protesters. Silvio found it hard to let the conflict die even once Tony had exhausted all avenues of winning the dispute. Silvio did not take this uncharacteristic behavior any further and although Tony noticed it, nothing became of it. Silvio got a chance to vent his frustration with Christopher at an intervention for his drug problems that ended with Christopher being violently put in his place by Paulie and Silvio. Since Christopher returned from rehab, his relationship with Silvio seems to have returned to their previous friendly association.

Silvio maintains a realistic relationship with Paulie Gualtieri, well aware of Paulie's tight-fisted attitude towards money and dangerous tendencies. Silvio has remarked to Tony that they know that Paulie does not kick up his full amount. Silvio also tried to warn Paulie that his distractedness had been noticed when Paulie let his loyalties to the Soprano family waver, not long after Silvio's own crisis of faith in Tony. Paulie and Silvio argued about this—Paulie had been harboring resentment toward Silvio since his illness got Paulie into the Pine Barrens fiasco. However, it was not long before Paulie returned his attention to staying in Tony's good graces.

Silvio counseled Tony through difficult decisions about Richie Aprile, and his disputes with Ralph Cifaretto, Feech La Manna and Tony Blundetto. He is often forced to convince Tony to go against his impulses—something that he usually manages without setting off Tony's hair-trigger temper. More often than not, when Silvio has something on his mind but will not speak about it, Tony often senses this and gets him to speak up.

When Tony ends up in a coma after being shot by his uncle in a fit of dementia, it falls upon Silvio to take the reins as acting boss of the Soprano family. At first, Silvio seemingly enjoys the job, and even feels a degree of regret that he did not accept an offer from the late Jackie Aprile Sr. to become the boss back in the late 1990s. His wife Gabriella prompts him to consider the possibilities of a permanent change if Tony does succumbs to his injuries.

His ambitions quickly subside when he feels the immense pressure of being boss and begins to have asthma attacks brought on by anxiety, as later alluded to by Tony when he says, "All due respect, you got no fucking idea what it's like being #1". As boss, Silvio dealt effectively with Paulie in a dispute over the split of profits from a heist Paulie had undertaken following a tip from Vito Spatafore. Ensuring Carmella receives Tony's share despite Paulie and Vito's hesitance. However, Silvio was indecisive in his handling of a dispute between Vito and Bobby Baccalieri over a collection route. The delay is further exacerbated by his Hospitalisation

After his return to the more comfortable role of consigliere, Silvio again counseled Tony about contentious issues. When Vito Spatafore was outed to the organization, Silvio convinced Tony of the need to restrain his desire to "give him a pass" because of the effect it would have on the other captains' view of his leadership. When Tony responded with distasteful jokes about Bobby's serious injury, a look from Silvio was enough to tell him he was being unfair.

When Vito came back from New Hampshire, Silvio said that there would be popular sentiment to get rid of him, but Tony initially decided to let Vito run a prostitution ring in Atlantic City. However, when Phil Leotardo confronted Tony about Vito being in New Jersey, Silvio and Tony both knew that they could not keep fighting with Phil over the issue and that if they wanted to keep the "no show" jobs, Vito would have to go. Silvio had always pushed for Vito to be taken care of and told Tony that it was the right move and not to beat himself up over the issue.

When Phil Leotardo and his men killed Vito (without permission from Tony), Tony told Silvio that it was not about Vito, it was about him. Silvio initially told Tony that they should go after one of Phil's men but Tony was trying to avoid a war and instead decided to blow up Phil's wire room in Sheepshead Bay.

Silvio and Carlo were at Satriale's Pork Store later that day when "Fat Dom" Gamiello came by. Dom started making jokes about Vito's homosexuality and implied that Carlo was homosexual. Silvio told Dom to leave, but when Dom continued his ridicule, anger got the best of the usually calm consigliere as he smashed his hand-held vacuum over Dom's head and held him while Carlo stabbed him to death. A short time afterward, Tony came by the shop to see them. Silvio advised Tony not to enter, but he couldn't stop Tony from finding Dom. Tony stormed out of the shop with Silvio right behind him telling Tony that "When you kill a made guy, this is what happens." During Carmine's disastrously mediated sit down Silvio denies involvement in Gamiello's disappearance

In the episode "Stage 5" Silvio was out at lunch with Gerry Torciano, the man Phil Leotardo wanted to take over as boss of the Lupertazzi family, when one of Doc Santoro's assassins killed Torciano. This outraged Tony, as Silvio could have been hurt during the altercation.

In the episode "The Blue Comet", it is revealed that the Lupertazzi family has recruited Burt Gervasi to begin a rebellion against Tony. Burt goes to Silvio to join in a coup d'état against the boss, but Silvio responds by strangling him to death at his home a short time later. Eventually, Phil Leotardo has contracts put out on Silvio, Bobby Bacala, and Tony in order to incapacitate the leadership of the family. Shortly after Bobby is killed, while Patsy Parisi drives Silvio outside of the Bada Bing club, a car moves in front of them, with two men coming out shooting multiple times. Silvio tries taking a pistol from a briefcase on the back seat, only to be shot in the back. Silvio manages to grab his pistol in time while Parisi holds them off. Parisi manages to defend them, but soon the two men begin to target Silvio more. He is shot once more in the chest, while Patsy runs into the woods, fleeing for his life. Afterward, Silvio is rushed to the hospital and placed in an intensive care unit.

Paulie later tells Tony that Silvio survived the assassination attempt but is in a coma. The doctors say that he is unlikely to regain consciousness. In the final episode, an emotional Tony visits the still comatose Silvio, whose fate is not mentioned further. Following the revelation that Carlo has cooperated to protect his son from drugs charges, it is likely Silvio will be indicted leaving his fate in ambiguity.

== Murders committed by Silvio ==
- Cyril: Shot while trying to escape after being tortured and questioned by Dickie Moltisanti (1971)

Victim
Victim	Year	Reason	Episode
James "Jimmy" Altieri	1999	Shot for being a suspected informant.	I Dream of Jeannie Cusamano
Salvatore "Big Pussy" Bonpensiero	2000	Shot by him, Paulie, and Tony for cooperating with the FBI.	Funhouse
Adriana La Cerva	2004	Shot for being an informant.	Long Term Parking
Dominic "Fat Dom" Gamiello	2006	Stabbed by Carlo Gervasi while Silvio held him down for making insulting comments to Carlo.	Cold Stones
Burt Gervasi	2007	Garroted for switching alliances to the Lupertazzi family during the war between the families.	The Blue Comet

== Character origins ==
Sopranos creator David Chase was impressed with Van Zandt's humorous appearance and presence after seeing him induct the Rascals into the Rock and Roll Hall of Fame in 1997, and invited him to audition. Van Zandt, a guitarist best known for playing in Bruce Springsteen's E Street Band, had never acted before. He auditioned for the role of Tony Soprano, but both HBO and Van Zandt himself felt that the role should go to an experienced actor, so Chase decided to create a role specifically for Van Zandt. Van Zandt eventually agreed to star on the show as consigliere, Silvio Dante. His real-life spouse Maureen was cast as his on-screen wife Gabriella.
