= Adriana La Cerva =

Fictional character from The Sopranos

- The Sopranos character
- Drea de Matteo as Adriana La Cerva
- First appearance: "The Sopranos" (1999)
- Last appearance: "Cold Stones" (2006)
- Created by: David Chase
- Portrayed by: Drea de Matteo

In-universe information
- Nickname: Ade
- Occupation: Manager of Club Crazy Horse
- Family: Liz La Cerva (mother)
- Spouse: Christopher Moltisanti (fiancé)
- Relatives: Richie Aprile (maternal uncle); Jackie Aprile Sr. (maternal uncle); Jackie Aprile Jr. (maternal cousin); Kelli Aprile (maternal cousin); Richie Aprile, Jr. (maternal cousin); Vito Spatafore (maternal cousin); Bryan Spatafore (maternal cousin)
- Nationality: Italian-American

Adriana La Cerva is a fictional character on the HBO TV series The Sopranos, portrayed by Drea de Matteo. She is the long-time girlfriend and, later, fiancée of Tony Soprano's protégé, Christopher Moltisanti. For her performance, de Matteo won the 2004 Emmy Award for Outstanding Supporting Actress in a Drama Series.

== Character history ==
Adriana is the niece of Jackie and Richie Aprile. She is not repulsed by the Mafia lifestyle and starts out as a hostess at Artie Bucco's restaurant, Vesuvio. Adriana is initially portrayed as shallow and materialistic, interested in the things that her boyfriend Christopher's money could buy: expensive cars, shoes, jewelry, drugs, and designer clothing. Despite the couple growing closer, she becomes a frequent victim of domestic violence at the hands of Christopher.

After he and Adriana fight, she moves in with her mother, but Chris gets her back by proposing to her, against her mother's advice. Despite this, the two do not get married. She reveals to Chris that she is potentially infertile, which leads to another bout of domestic violence.

Adriana desires to have a business of her own. In Season 3, Christopher acquires The Lollipop Lounge in Long Branch, New Jersey, from a gambling debtor, and turns it over to Adriana to manage as she pleases. Adriana renames the bar "Crazy Horse" and makes it successful as a venue for local alternative rock bands and as a bar for college students from nearby Monmouth University and elsewhere. Benny Fazio is beaten in the nightclub's parking lot by Phil Leotardo. In season 4, Adriana reveals that she is possibly infertile due to complications from a previous abortion. In season 5, Adriana is diagnosed with ulcerative colitis.

=== The mole ===
By the end of season 3, The Federal Bureau of Investigation (FBI) targets Adriana as a potential witness in the family's organization. Upon the death of Sal "Big Pussy" Bonpensiero, the FBI looks to Adriana as a close relation to Christopher, a rising star in the crime family, and sends Special Agent Deborah Ciccerone to befriend her in "Army of One". Ciccerone, who goes by "Danielle Ciccolella", succeeds at befriending Adriana, but the FBI have to abandon the mission earlier than planned when Christopher makes a pass at Ciccerone, upsetting Adriana.

In "No Show", the FBI brings Adriana in and threatens her with long imprisonment for drug possession, or perhaps punishment by Tony Soprano, if she does not co-operate. Adriana vomits all over herself, the table, and the agents.

Out of loyalty to Christopher, Adriana avoids giving up any serious information on the family and does her best to avoid the Soprano family house in order to have nothing to give back to the FBI. In "Long Term Parking", her deception catches up with her after the FBI learns of her involvement in covering up a murder at her club. The FBI threatens to press charges of being an accessory to murder against her unless she offers full cooperation. Adriana refuses to wear a wire, instead asking the FBI for a chance to bring Christopher in with her and cooperate together.

She reveals the truth to Christopher, hoping they can go into the Witness Protection Program together and start new lives. An enraged Christopher beats and almost strangles her, before breaking down crying. His loyalty to his crime family turns out to be greater than his love for Adriana, and he reveals her status as an informant to Tony. Tony telephones Adriana, falsely informing her that Christopher attempted suicide at a diner in Ramapo Mountain State Forest before being found by the New Jersey State Police and has been hospitalized, and that Silvio Dante will drive her to the hospital.

En route on Interstate 287, Silvio stops the car in the middle of the woods. Realizing what is about to happen, a terrified Adriana tries to flee, crawling away from the car on all fours off screen when Silvio shoots her dead. Christopher is later seen putting some of her clothes in a red suitcase, which he then discards. He then leaves her light blue Ford Thunderbird in the long-term parking lot at Newark Liberty International Airport.

=== Post-mortem ===
In the season 6 episode "The Ride", Carmela Soprano runs into Adriana's mother, Liz La Cerva, who tells Carmela that she believes Christopher killed Adriana and that the FBI questioned her about Adriana's disappearance. When Carmela tells Tony about their conversation, he dismisses her fears, explaining that if Christopher had killed Adriana then her body would have been found by now. In addition, he points out to Carmela that if the FBI really suspected Christopher, then they would have arrested him.

While in Paris, Carmela dreams of seeing Adriana in a park, but a policeman tells her Adriana is dead. Carmela is intent on finding her, especially after Liz La Cerva tries to kill herself. However, Tony and Silvio pull some strings and Carmela is able to continue construction on her spec house, and the distraction keeps her from investigating the matter further.

== See also ==
- FBI on The Sopranos
