= Music on The Sopranos =

The HBO television drama The Sopranos received considerable critical attention for effective use of an eclectic array of music. Series creator David Chase personally selected all the show's music, with the producer Martin Bruestle and music editor Kathryn Dayak—sometimes also consulting Steven Van Zandt, who portrays Silvio Dante on the show and is also a guitarist for Bruce Springsteen's E Street Band. They often selected music after completing an episode's production and editing, but occasionally filmed sequences to match pre-selected pieces of music.

Stylistically, the music on the show ranges from mainstream pop (Britney Spears, The Bangles) to oldies and classic rock artists (The Beach Boys, The Rolling Stones, Pink Floyd), from classic jazz and soul (Ella Fitzgerald, Ben E. King) to hip-hop (Xzibit, Time Zone), often within a single episode.

== Opening credits ==
In the opening credits for each episode, Tony Soprano (James Gandolfini) drives from the Lincoln Tunnel to his home in North Caldwell, New Jersey. The musical accompaniment for this segment is the "Chosen One Mix" of the song "Woke Up This Morning" by the British band Alabama 3 (known in the United States as A3 for legal reasons). "Woke Up This Morning (Chosen One Mix)" is four minutes and five seconds long, so a shortened version of it is used in the opening credits, which is approximately one minute and thirty seconds long.

== End credits ==
Each episode's closing credits sequence features a unique piece of previously recorded music, with few exceptions. The episode "A Hit Is a Hit" uses a song by the fictional band Defiler, which appeared earlier in the episode. Three episodes feature multiple songs in the credits sequence ("Commendatori," "Whitecaps" and "Cold Stones"), while two episodes ("Full Leather Jacket" and "Made in America") have no music at all.

The following is a list of songs used at the end of each episode:

=== Season 1 ===
#	Episode title	Song title	Artist
1	"The Sopranos"	"The Beast in Me"	Nick Lowe
2	"46 Long"	"Battle Flag"	Pigeonhed
3	"Denial, Anger, Acceptance"	"Complicated Shadows"	Elvis Costello & the Attractions
4	"Meadowlands"	"Look on Down from the Bridge"	Mazzy Star
5	"College"	"Gold Leaves"	Michael Hoppé
6	"Pax Soprana"	"Paparazzi" (instrumental version)	Xzibit (produced by Thayod Ausar)
7	"Down Neck"	"White Rabbit"	Jefferson Airplane
8	"The Legend of Tennessee Moltisanti"	"Frank Sinatra"	Cake
9	"Boca"	"Buena"	Morphine
10	"A Hit Is a Hit"	song unnamed	Defiler (fictional group)
11	"Nobody Knows Anything"	"Manifold de Amour"	Latin Playboys
12	"Isabella"	"I Feel Free"	Cream
13	"I Dream of Jeannie Cusamano"	"State Trooper"	Bruce Springsteen

=== Season 2 ===
#	Episode title	Song title	Artist
14	"Guy Walks into a Psychiatrist's Office..."	"Time Is on My Side"	Irma Thomas
15	"Do Not Resuscitate"	"Goodnight My Love"	Ella Fitzgerald
16	"Toodle-Fucking-Oo"	"Viking"	Los Lobos
17	"Commendatori"	"Con te partirò"	Andrea Bocelli
17	"Commendatori"	"Piove"	Jovanotti
18	"Big Girls Don't Cry"	"White Mustang II"	Daniel Lanois
19	"The Happy Wanderer"	"The Happy Wanderer"	Frankie Yankovic & His Yanks
20	"D-Girl"	"Vedi, Maria"	Emma Shapplin
21	"Full Leather Jacket"	none — only a ventilator and an electrocardiogram are heard	none
22	"From Where to Eternity"	"My Lover's Prayer"	Otis Redding
23	"Bust Out"	"Wheel in the Sky"	Journey
24	"House Arrest"	"You Can't Put Your Arms Around a Memory"	Johnny Thunders
25	"The Knight in White Satin Armor"	"I Saved the World Today"	Eurythmics
26	"Funhouse"	"Thru and Thru"	The Rolling Stones

=== Season 3 ===
#	Episode title	Song title	Artist
27	"Mr. Ruggerio's Neighborhood"	"High Fidelity"	Elvis Costello & the Attractions
28	"Proshai, Livushka"	"I'm Forever Blowing Bubbles"	Les Paul
29	"Fortunate Son"	"Where's the Money?"	Dan Hicks
30	"Employee of the Month"	"Fisherman's Daughter"	Daniel Lanois
31	"Another Toothpick"	"Shuck Dub"	R. L. Burnside
32	"University"	"Living on a Thin Line"	The Kinks
33	"Second Opinion"	"Black Books"	Nils Lofgren
34	"He Is Risen"	"The Captain"	Kasey Chambers
35	"The Telltale Moozadell"	"I (Who Have Nothing)"	Ben E. King
36	"...To Save Us All from Satan's Power"	"I've Got a Feeling"	The Campbell Brothers with Katie Jackson
37	"Pine Barrens"	"Sposa son disprezzata" (from Bajazet)	Cecilia Bartoli
38	"Amour Fou"	"Affection"	Little Steven and the Lost Boys
39	"Army of One"	"Blur"	Aphex Twin

=== Season 4 ===
#	Episode title	Song title	Artist
40	"For All Debts Public and Private"	"World Destruction"	Time Zone featuring John Lydon
41	"No Show"	"Kid A"	Radiohead
42	"Christopher"	"Dawn (Go Away)"	The Four Seasons
43	"The Weight"	"Vesuvio"	Spaccanapoli
44	"Pie-O-My"	"My Rifle, My Pony and Me" (from Rio Bravo)	Dean Martin and Ricky Nelson
45	"Everybody Hurts"	"Take Me for a Little While"	Dave Edmunds
46	"Watching Too Much Television"	"Oh Girl"	The Chi-Lites
47	"Mergers and Acquisitions"	"When the Battle is Over"	Delaney & Bonnie
48	"Whoever Did This"	"The Man with the Harmonica"	Apollo 440
49	"The Strong, Silent Type"	"Drum Score"	Eric J.Tuener; Drum Major for George Westinghouse School of Music
50	"Calling All Cars"	"Surfin' U.S.A."	The Beach Boys
51	"Eloise"	"Little Bird"	Annie Lennox
52	"Whitecaps"	"I Love Paris" (Vegas)	Dean Martin
52	"Whitecaps"	"I Have Dreamed"	Fantastic Strings

=== Season 5 ===
#	Episode title	Song title	Artist
53	"Two Tonys"	"Heaven Only Knows"	Emmylou Harris
54	"Rat Pack"	"Undercover of the Night"	The Rolling Stones
55	"Where's Johnny?"	"Earth, Wind, Water"	Mitch Coodley (The Metro Music Production Library)
56	"All Happy Families..."	"La Petite Mer"	Thierry 'Titi' Robin
57	"Irregular Around the Margins"	"Chi il bel sogno di Doretta" (from La rondine)	Luba Orgonášová
58	"Sentimental Education"	"The Blues is My Business"	Etta James
59	"In Camelot"	"Melancholy Serenade"	Jackie Gleason
60	"Marco Polo"	"Bad 'N' Ruin"	Faces
61	"Unidentified Black Males"	"If I Were a Carpenter"	Bobby Darin
62	"Cold Cuts"	"I'm Not Like Everybody Else" (live)	The Kinks
63	"The Test Dream"	"Three Times a Lady"	Commodores
64	"Long Term Parking"	"Wrapped in My Memory"	Shawn Smith
65	"All Due Respect"	"Glad Tidings"	Van Morrison

=== Season 6 ===
Part I

#	Episode title	Song title	Artist
66	"Members Only"	"Seven Souls"	Material featuring William S. Burroughs
67	"Join the Club"	"When It's Cold I'd Like To Die"	Moby
68	"Mayham"	"The Deadly Nightshade"	Daniel Lanois
69	"The Fleshy Part of the Thigh"	"One of These Days"	Pink Floyd
70	"Mr. & Mrs. John Sacrimoni Request"	"Every Day of the Week"	The Students
71	"Live Free or Die"	"4th of July"	X
72	"Luxury Lounge"	"Recuerdos de la Alhambra"	Pepe Romero
73	"Johnny Cakes"	"I'm Gonna Move to the Outskirts of Town"	Ray Charles
74	"The Ride"	"Pipeline"	Johnny Thunders
75	"Moe n' Joe"	"Let It Rock"	Chuck Berry
76	"Cold Stones"	"Home"	Persephone's Bees
76	"Cold Stones"	"As Time Goes By" (from Casablanca)	Dooley Wilson
77	"Kaisha"	"Moonlight Mile"	The Rolling Stones

Part II

#	Episode title	Song title	Artist
78	"Soprano Home Movies"	"This Magic Moment"	Ben E. King and The Drifters
79	"Stage 5"	"Evidently Chickentown"	John Cooper Clarke
80	"Remember When"	"Sing, Sing, Sing (With a Swing)"	Benny Goodman Orchestra
81	"Chasing It"	"Goin' Down Slow"	Howlin' Wolf
82	"Walk Like a Man"	"The Valley"	Los Lobos
83	"Kennedy and Heidi"	"Minas De Cobre (For Better Metal)"	Calexico
84	"The Second Coming"	"Ninna Ninna (Lullaby)"	Smithsonian Folkways recording, artist unknown
85	"The Blue Comet"	"Running Wild (Extended Instrumental)"	Tindersticks
86	"Made in America"	none — the credits play in complete silence	none

== Alternate music in Europe ==
For the version of the series aired in Europe, the producers partially replaced the music for licensing reasons. European DVD editions (in the case of the first season, only the 16:9 re-issue) contain these altered versions as foreign-language dubs as well as the original unaltered English soundtrack in Dolby Digital 5.1.

== Soundtrack compilations ==
The Sopranos: Music from the HBO Original Series

Soundtrack album by various artists
- Released: December 14, 1999
- Genre: Various
- Length: 54:11
- Labels: Playtone; Columbia Records; Sony Music Soundtrax
- Producers: Various; David Chase; Martin Bruestle (exec. producer)

The Sopranos: Music from the HBO Original Series
Review scores
Source	Rating
Allmusic	link
Pitchfork Media	7.1/10 link

The Sopranos: Peppers & Eggs: Music from the HBO Original Series

Soundtrack album by various artists
- Released: May 8, 2001
- Genre: Various
- Labels: Playtone; Columbia Records; Sony Music Soundtrax
- Producers: Various; David Chase, Brad Grey; Martin Bruestle (exec. producers)

The Sopranos: Peppers & Eggs: Music from the HBO Original Series
Review scores
Source	Rating
Allmusic	link

To date, there have been two official soundtrack compilations released in association with The Sopranos. The first, titled The Sopranos: Music from the HBO Original Series, was released in 1999, and contains selections from the show's first two seasons. The second, titled The Sopranos: Peppers & Eggs: Music from the HBO Original Series, was released in 2001, and contains two compact discs of songs from the show's first three seasons.

=== Track listings ===
==== The Sopranos: Music from the HBO Original Series ====
1. "Woke Up This Morning" (Chosen One Mix) — Alabama 3
2. "It's Bad You Know" — R. L. Burnside
3. "It Was a Very Good Year" — Frank Sinatra
4. "Gotta Serve Somebody" — Bob Dylan
5. "Inside of Me" — Little Steven & The Disciples of Soul
6. "I Feel Free" — Cream
7. "Mystic Eyes" — Them
8. "State Trooper" — Bruce Springsteen
9. "I'm a Man" — Bo Diddley
10. "Complicated Shadows" — Elvis Costello & the Attractions
11. "The Beast in Me" — Nick Lowe
12. "Viking" — Los Lobos
13. "Blood Is Thicker than Water" — Wyclef Jean featuring G & B
14. "I've Tried Everything" — Eurythmics

==== The Sopranos - Peppers & Eggs: Music from the HBO Series ====
===== Disc one =====
1. "Every Breath You Take/Theme from Peter Gunn" (Mr. Ruggerio's Remix) - The Police; Henry Mancini and His Orchestra
2. "Battle Flag" (Album Version) - Pigeonhed
3. "I've Got A Feeling" (Album Version) - The Campbell Brothers with Katie Jackson
4. "The Captain" (Album Version) - Kasey Chambers
5. "Shuck Dub" (Album Version) - R.L. Burnside
6. "Affection" (Album Version) - The Lost Boys
7. "My Lover's Prayer" (Album Version) - Otis Redding
8. "Certamente" (Album Version) Madreblu
9. "Black Books" (Album Version) - Nils Lofgren
10. "Frank Sinatra" (Album Version) - Cake
11. "Baubles, Bangles and Beads" (Album Version) - Frank Sinatra
12. "Thru And Thru" (Album Version) - The Rolling Stones

===== Disc two =====
1. "High Fidelity" - Elvis Costello & The Attractions
2. "Living on a Thin Line" - The Kinks
3. "Girl" - Vue
4. "Vivaldi: Sposa son disprezzata" - Cecilia Bartoli
5. "I Who Have Nothing" - Ben E. King
6. "Return to Me" - Bob Dylan
7. "Make no Mistake" - Keith Richards
8. "Piove" - Lorenzo Jovanotti
9. "Space Invader" - The Pretenders
10. "Tiny Tears" - Tindersticks
11. "Gloria" - Van Morrison
12. "Core 'ngrato" - Dominic Chianese
13. "Dialogue From 'The Sopranos'" - The Sopranos Cast
