= 55th Primetime Emmy Awards =

2003 American television programming awards

- Promotional poster
- Date: September 21, 2003 (Ceremony); September 13, 2003 (Creative Arts Awards)
- Location: Shrine Auditorium, Los Angeles, California
- Presented by: Academy of Television Arts and Sciences

Highlights
- Most awards: Major: Door to Door; Everybody Loves Raymond; The Sopranos (4); All: Door to Door (6)
- Most nominations: The Sopranos (10)
- Outstanding Comedy Series: Everybody Loves Raymond
- Outstanding Drama Series: The West Wing
- Outstanding Miniseries: Taken
- Outstanding Reality-Competition Program: The Amazing Race
- Outstanding Variety, Music or Comedy Series: The Daily Show with Jon Stewart
- Website: http://www.emmys.com/

Television/radio coverage
- Network: Fox
- Produced by: Brad Lachman

The 55th Primetime Emmy Awards were held on Sunday, September 21, 2003. The ceremony was broadcast on Fox. The Sci Fi channel received its first major nomination this year for Outstanding Miniseries for Taken; the series won the award. 28 competitive awards were presented.

With the win for Outstanding Lead Actress in a Comedy Series for Debra Messing, Will & Grace became only the third television show to have all credited actors win a Primetime Emmy Award for their respective role, following All in the Family and The Golden Girls (also later tied by The Simpsons). For its seventh season, Everybody Loves Raymond won its first Primetime Emmy Award for Outstanding Comedy Series. It led all comedies with four major wins and ten major nominations. The West Wing won Outstanding Drama Series for the fourth consecutive year, tying the record set by Hill Street Blues (also later tied by Game of Thrones and Mad Men).

Despite failing to win Outstanding Drama Series, The Sopranos continued to rake in the awards, leading all dramas with four major wins, including James Gandolfini and Edie Falco winning their third and final trophy for their respective category. Also Joe Pantoliano's win for Supporting Actor in a Drama marked the first time HBO had won in this category.

Additionally, for the first time, not only did the Lead Male in a Comedy award go to a show outside the Big Four TV networks, with Tony Shalhoub's win, for Monk on the USA Network, it was that network's first ever Acting win.

For the first time since 1991, the Outstanding Drama Series field did not include Law & Order; it was nominated 11 times in the category, a record for drama series that still stands. The mark tied the overall record held by comedy series M*A*S*H and Cheers. For the first time since its premiere, Frasier, then in its tenth and penultimate season, didn't win a major award, with its only major nominations going to David Hyde Pierce and John Mahoney for Outstanding Supporting Actor in a Comedy Series. The ceremony featured 11 presenters, which included: Ellen DeGeneres, Brad Garrett, Darrell Hammond, George Lopez, Conan O'Brien, Bernie Mac, Dennis Miller, Garry Shandling (who opened the show with a comedic monologue), Martin Short, Jon Stewart, and Wanda Sykes.

== Winners and nominees ==
Winners are listed first and highlighted in bold:

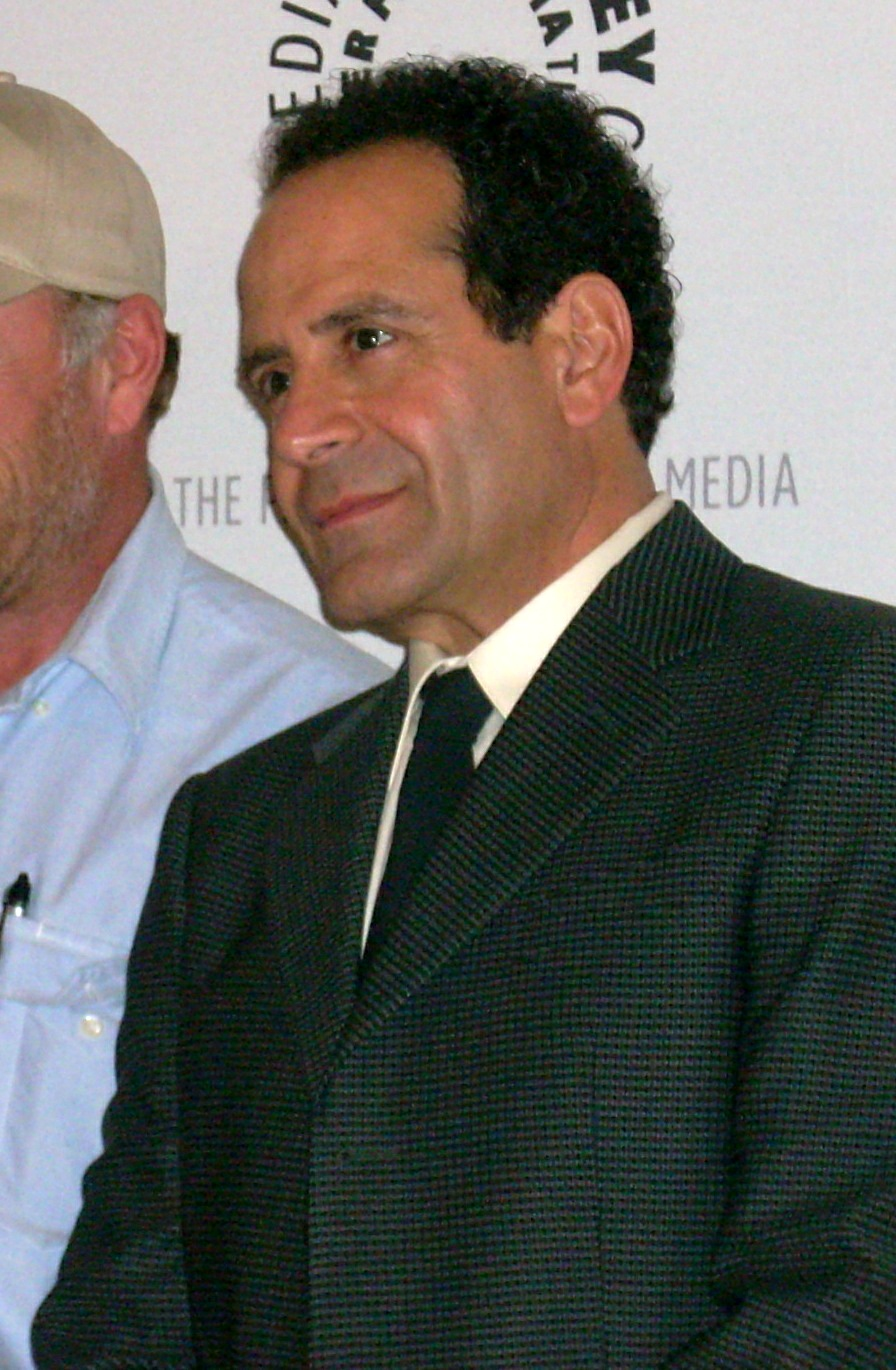
Tony Shalhoub, Outstanding Lead Actor in a Comedy Series winner

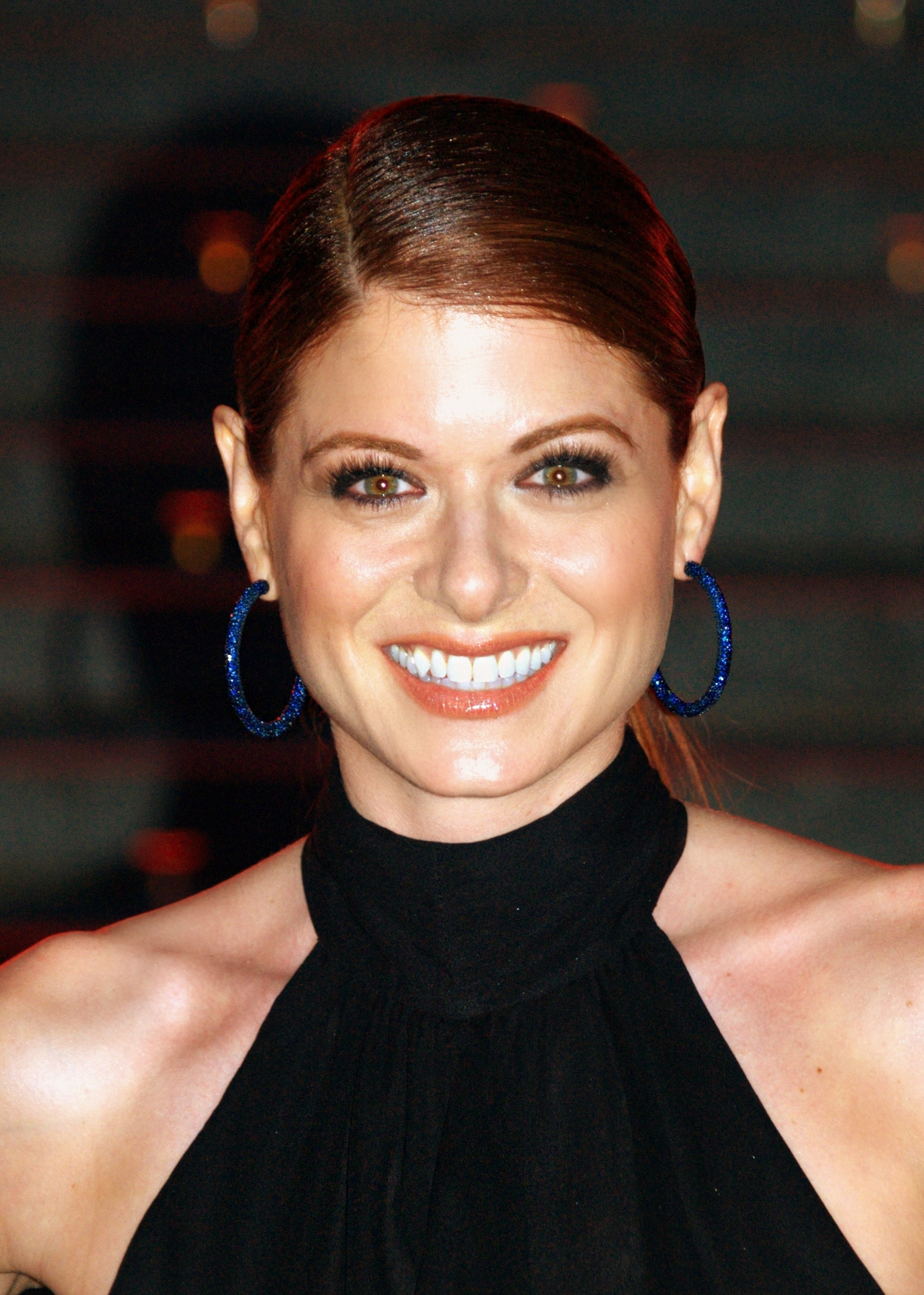
Debra Messing, Outstanding Lead Actress in a Comedy Series winner

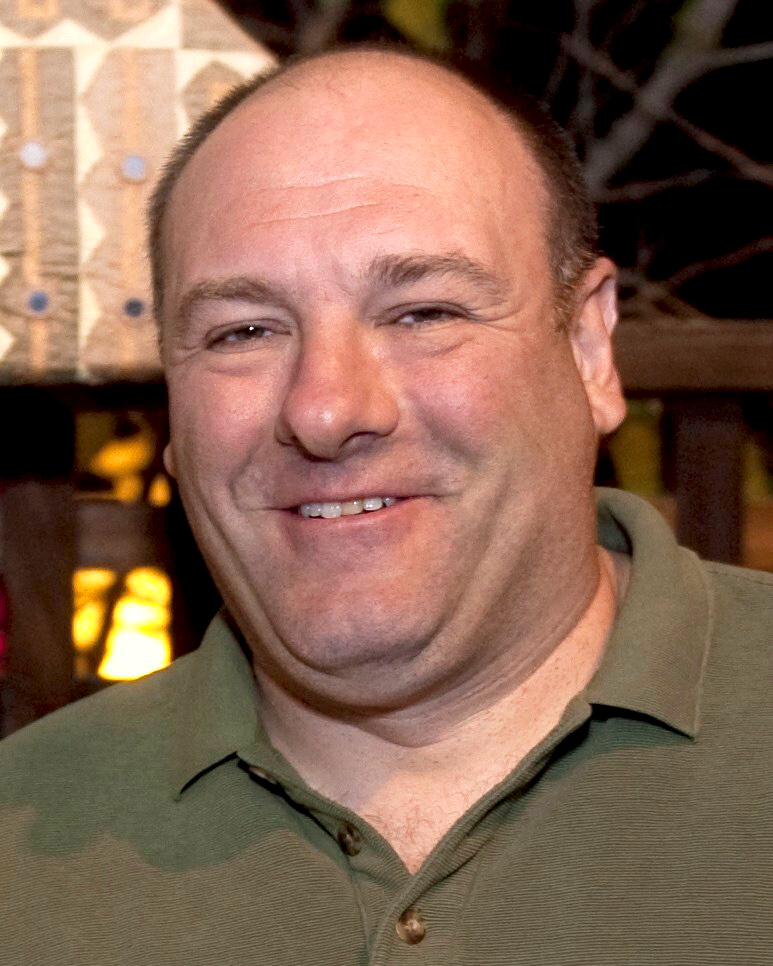
James Gandolfini, Outstanding Lead Actor in a Drama Series winner

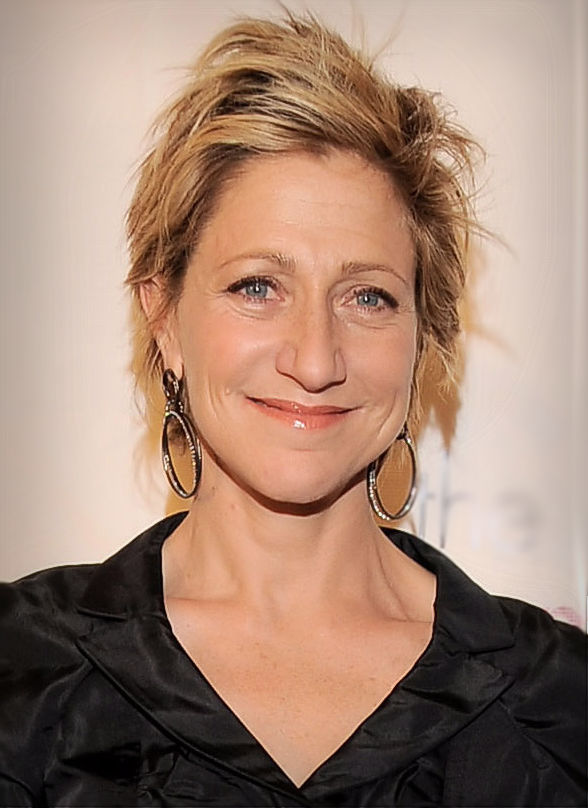
Edie Falco, Outstanding Lead Actress in a Drama Series winner

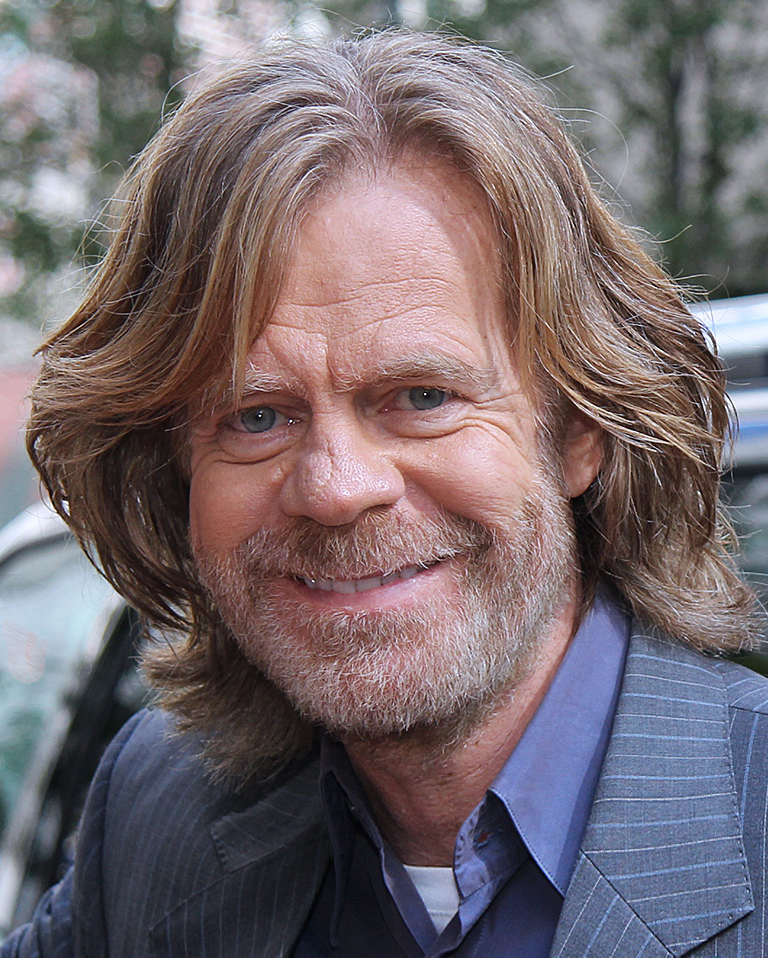
William H. Macy, Outstanding Lead Actor in a Miniseries or Movie winner

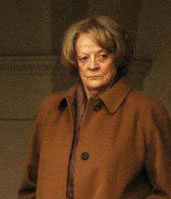
Maggie Smith, Outstanding Lead Actress in a Miniseries or Movie winner

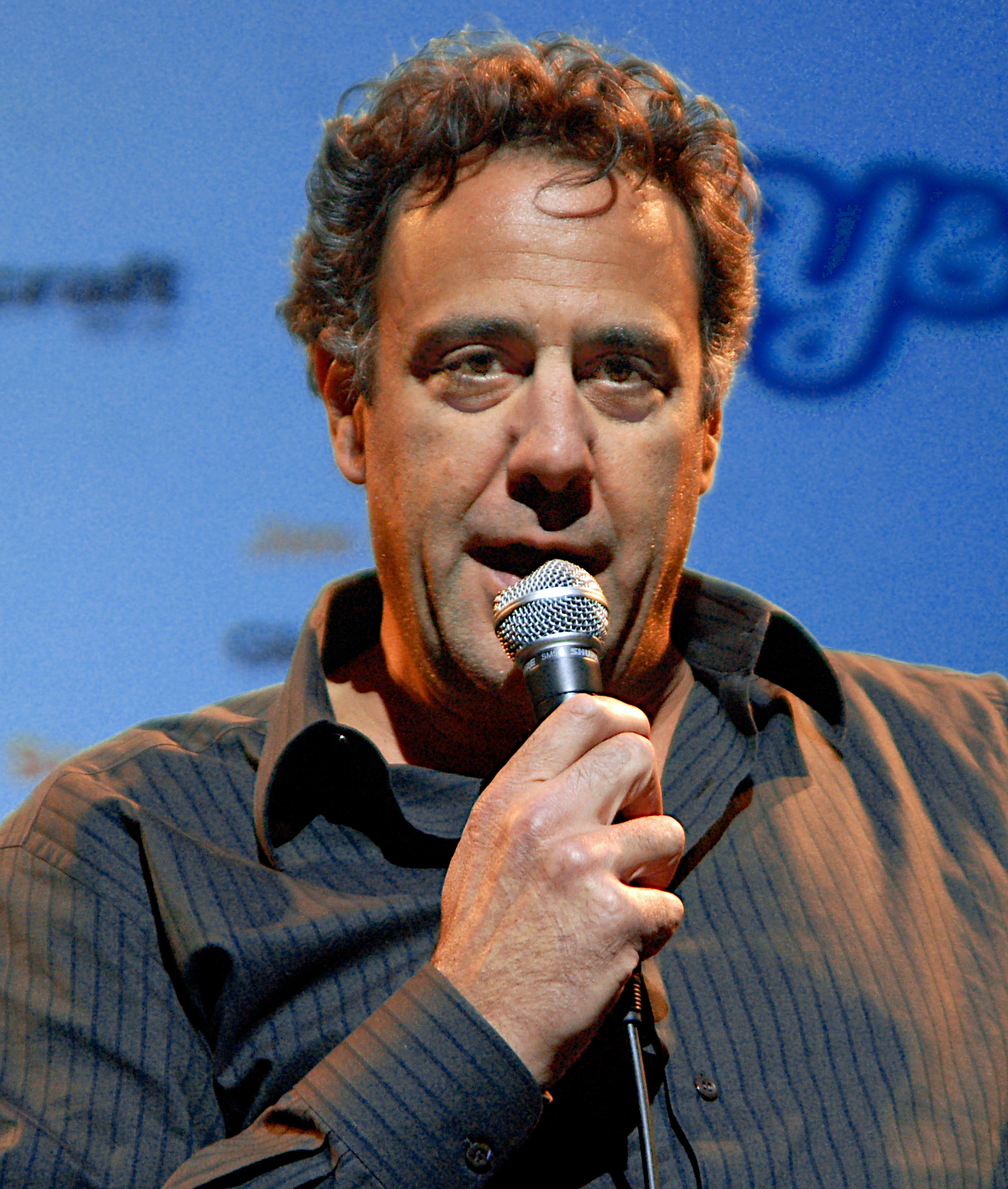
Brad Garrett, Outstanding Supporting Actor in a Comedy Series winner

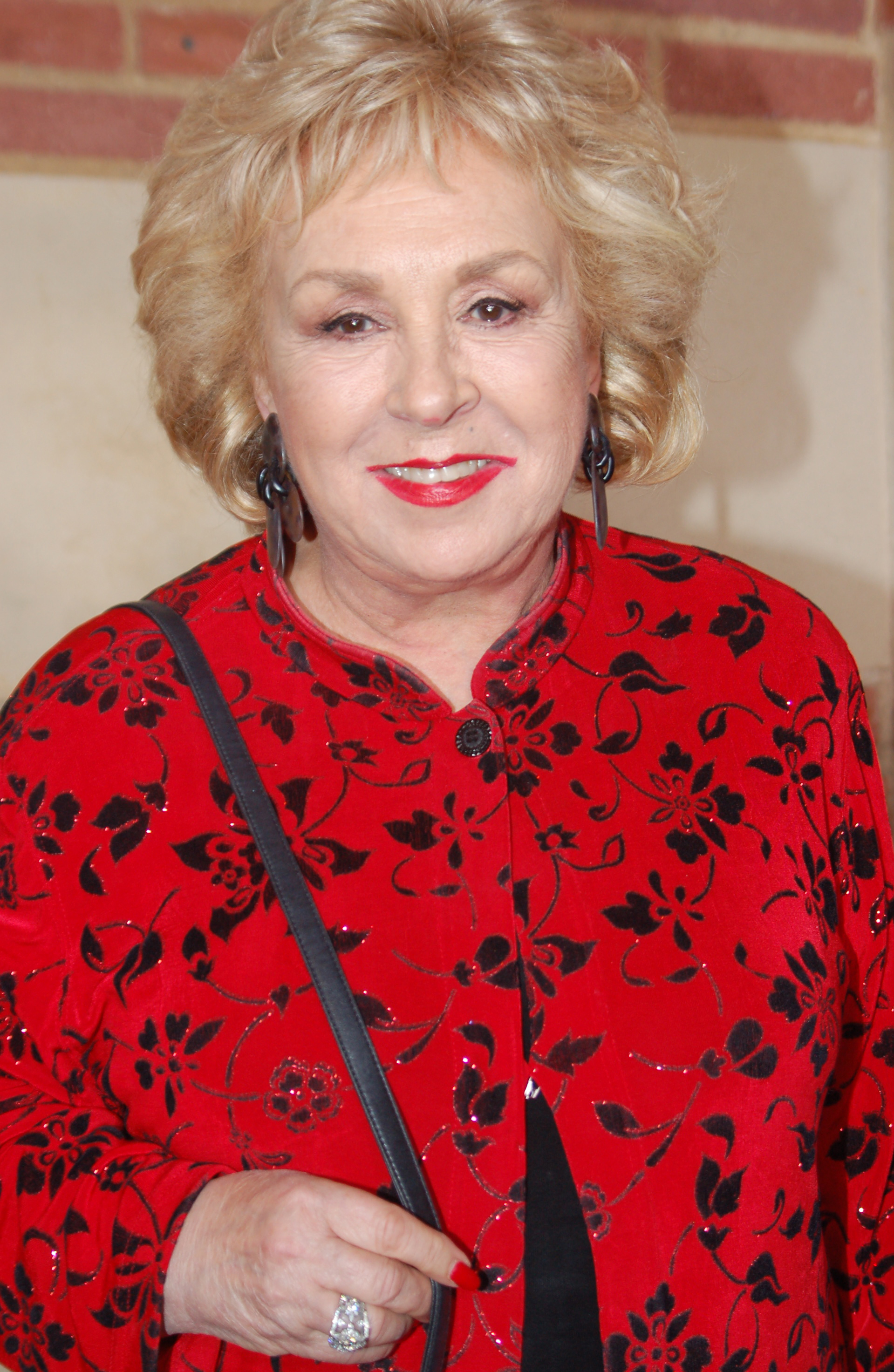
Doris Roberts, Outstanding Supporting Actress in a Comedy Series winner

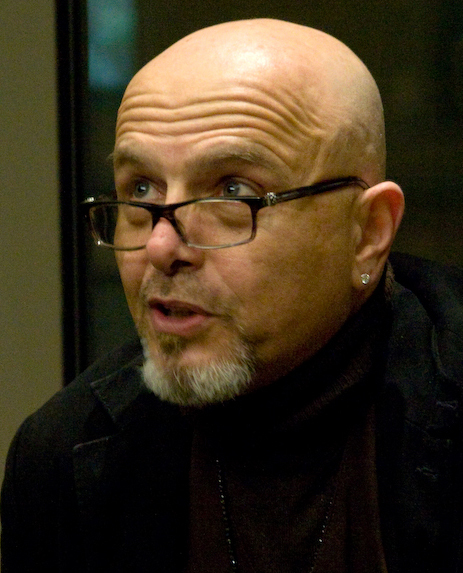
Joe Pantoliano, Outstanding Supporting Actor in a Drama Series winner

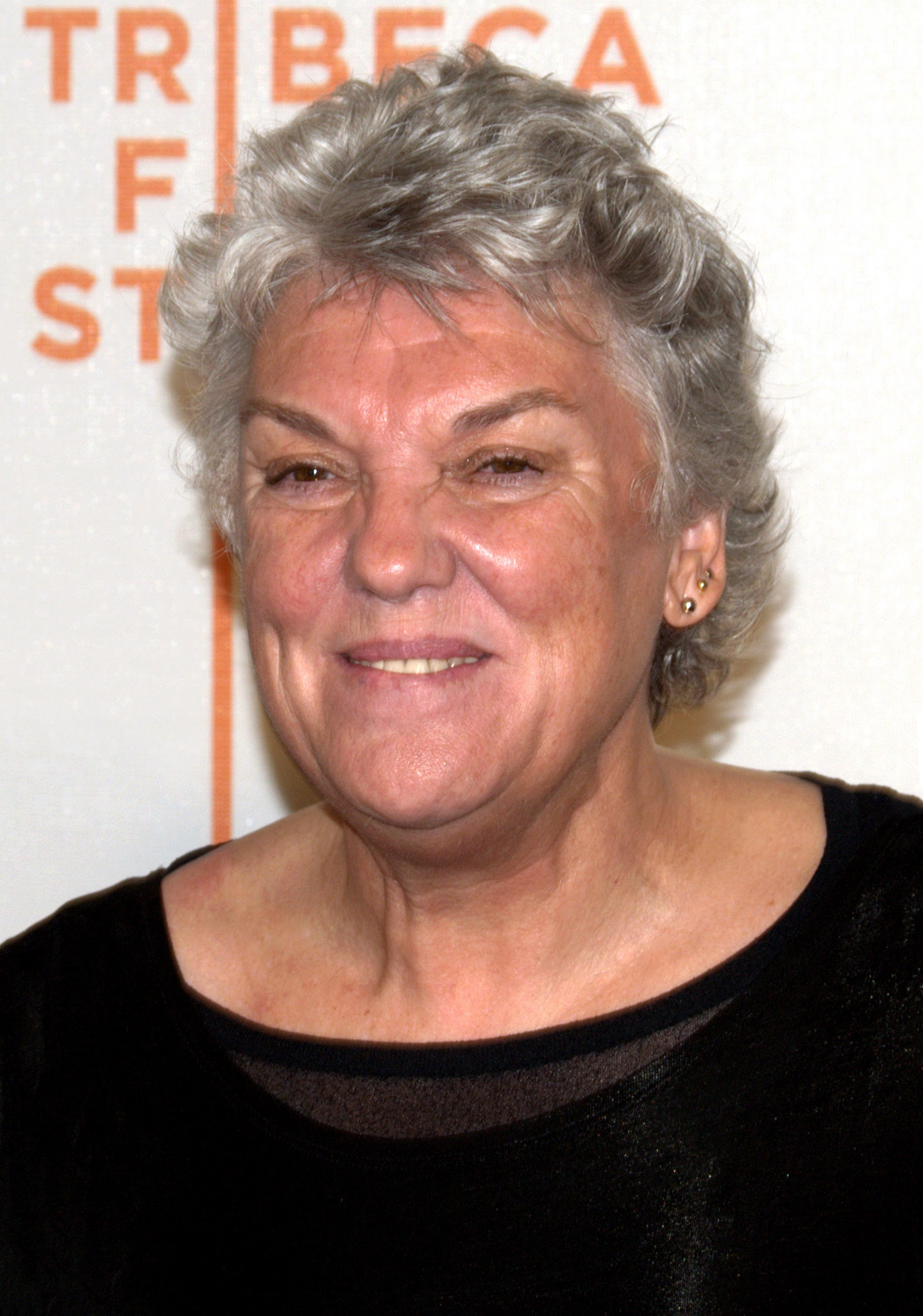
Tyne Daly, Outstanding Supporting Actress in a Drama Series winner

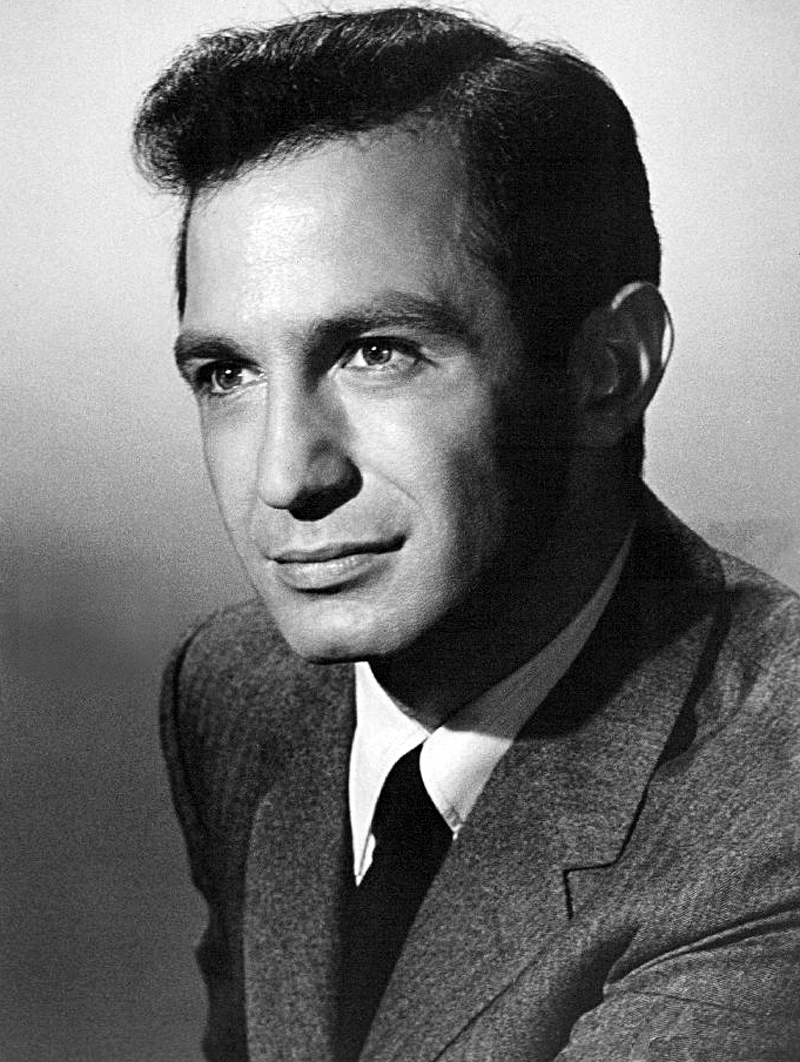
Ben Gazzara, Outstanding Supporting Actor in a Miniseries or Movie winner

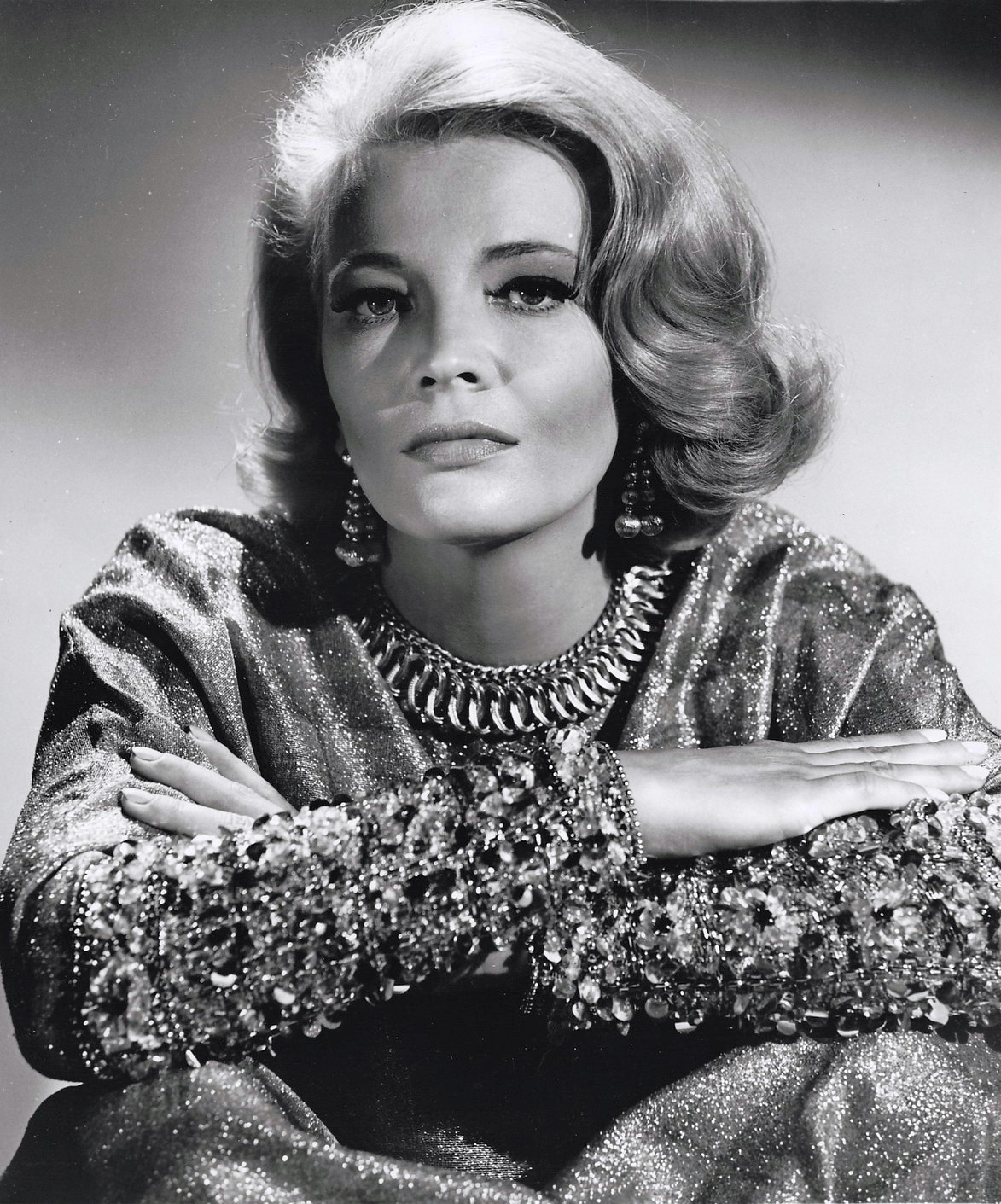
Gena Rowlands, Outstanding Supporting Actress in a Miniseries or Movie winner

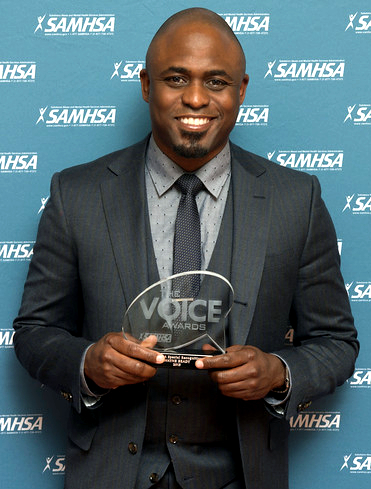
Wayne Brady, Outstanding Individual Performance in a Variety or Music Program winner

=== Programs ===
Programs
**Outstanding Comedy Series**: **Everybody Loves Raymond (CBS)**; Curb Your Enthusiasm (HBO); Friends (NBC); Sex and the City (HBO); Will & Grace (NBC)	**Outstanding Drama Series**: **The West Wing (NBC)**; 24 (Fox); CSI: Crime Scene Investigation (CBS); Six Feet Under (HBO); The Sopranos (HBO)
**Outstanding Variety, Music or Comedy Series**: **The Daily Show with Jon Stewart (Comedy Central)**; Late Night with Conan O'Brien (NBC); Late Show with David Letterman (CBS); Saturday Night Live (NBC); The Tonight Show with Jay Leno (NBC)	**Outstanding Variety, Music or Comedy Special**: **Cher: The Farewell Tour (NBC)**; 75th Annual Academy Awards (ABC); Bruce Springsteen & the E Street Band (CBS); Robin Williams: Live on Broadway (HBO); Rolling Stones: Forty Licks World Tour Live at Madison Square Garden (HBO)
**Outstanding Made for Television Movie**: **Door to Door (TNT)**; Homeless to Harvard: The Liz Murray Story (Lifetime); Live from Baghdad (HBO); My House in Umbria (HBO); Normal (HBO)	**Outstanding Miniseries**: **Taken (Sci Fi)**; Hitler: The Rise of Evil (CBS); Napoléon (A&E)
**Outstanding Reality-Competition Program**: **The Amazing Race (CBS)**; 100 Years of Hope and Humor (NBC); AFI's 100 Years... 100 Passions: America's Greatest Love Stories (CBS); American Idol: The Search for a Superstar (Fox); Survivor (CBS)

=== Acting ===
==== Lead performances ====
Lead performances
**Outstanding Lead Actor in a Comedy Series**: **Tony Shalhoub – Monk as Adrian Monk (USA)**; Larry David – Curb Your Enthusiasm as himself (HBO); Matt LeBlanc – Friends as Joey Tribbiani (NBC); Bernie Mac – The Bernie Mac Show as Bernie McCullough (Fox); Eric McCormack – Will & Grace as Will Truman (NBC); Ray Romano – Everybody Loves Raymond as Ray Barone (CBS) (Episode: “Counseling”)	**Outstanding Lead Actress in a Comedy Series**: **Debra Messing – Will & Grace as Grace Adler (NBC)**; Jennifer Aniston – Friends as Rachel Green (NBC); Patricia Heaton – Everybody Loves Raymond as Debra Barone (CBS) (Episode: “Baggage”); Jane Kaczmarek – Malcolm in the Middle as Lois (Fox) (Episode: “Baby”); Sarah Jessica Parker – Sex and the City as Carrie Bradshaw (HBO)
**Outstanding Lead Actor in a Drama Series**: **James Gandolfini – The Sopranos as Tony Soprano (HBO)**; Michael Chiklis – The Shield as Vic Mackey (FX); Peter Krause – Six Feet Under as Nate Fisher (HBO); Martin Sheen – The West Wing as President Jed Bartlet (NBC); Kiefer Sutherland – 24 as Jack Bauer (Fox)	**Outstanding Lead Actress in a Drama Series**: **Edie Falco – The Sopranos as Carmela Soprano (HBO)**; Frances Conroy – Six Feet Under as Ruth Fisher (HBO); Jennifer Garner – Alias as Sydney Bristow (ABC); Marg Helgenberger – CSI: Crime Scene Investigation as Catherine Willows (CBS); Allison Janney – The West Wing as C. J. Cregg (NBC)
**Outstanding Lead Actor in a Miniseries or a Movie**: **William H. Macy – Door to Door as Bill Porter (TNT)**; Brad Garrett – Gleason as Jackie Gleason (CBS); Paul Newman – Our Town as the Stage Manager (Showtime); Tom Wilkinson – Normal as Ruth "Roy" Applewood (HBO); James Woods – Rudy: The Rudy Giuliani Story as Rudy Giuliani (USA)	**Outstanding Lead Actress in a Miniseries or a Movie**: **Maggie Smith – My House in Umbria as Emily Delahunty (HBO)**; Thora Birch – Homeless to Harvard: The Liz Murray Story as Liz Murray (Lifetime); Helena Bonham Carter – Live from Baghdad as Ingrid Formanek (HBO); Jessica Lange – Normal as Irma Applewood (HBO); Helen Mirren – The Roman Spring of Mrs. Stone as Karen Stone (Showtime)

==== Supporting performances ====
Supporting performances
**Outstanding Supporting Actor in a Comedy Series**: **Brad Garrett – Everybody Loves Raymond as Robert Barone (CBS) (Episodes “Just a Formality” and “Robert’s Wedding”)**; Peter Boyle – Everybody Loves Raymond as Frank Barone (CBS) (Episodes: “Grandpa Steals” and “Meeting the Parents”); Bryan Cranston – Malcolm in the Middle as Hal (Fox) (Episodes: “Malcolm Holds His Tongue” and “Day Care”); Sean Hayes – Will & Grace as Jack McFarland (NBC); John Mahoney – Frasier as Martin Crane (NBC); David Hyde Pierce – Frasier as Dr. Niles Crane (NBC)	**Outstanding Supporting Actress in a Comedy Series**: **Doris Roberts – Everybody Loves Raymond as Marie Barone (CBS) (Episodes: “Marie’s Vision” and “Robert’s Wedding”)**; Kim Cattrall – Sex and the City as Samantha Jones (HBO); Cheryl Hines – Curb Your Enthusiasm as Cheryl David (HBO); Megan Mullally – Will & Grace as Karen Walker (NBC); Cynthia Nixon – Sex and the City as Miranda Hobbes (HBO)
**Outstanding Supporting Actor in a Drama Series**: **Joe Pantoliano – The Sopranos as Ralph Cifaretto (HBO)**; Victor Garber – Alias as Jack Bristow (ABC); Michael Imperioli – The Sopranos as Christopher Moltisanti (HBO); John Spencer – The West Wing as Leo McGarry (NBC); Bradley Whitford – The West Wing as Josh Lyman (NBC)	**Outstanding Supporting Actress in a Drama Series**: **Tyne Daly – Judging Amy as Maxine Gray (CBS)**; Lauren Ambrose – Six Feet Under as Claire Fisher (HBO); Stockard Channing – The West Wing as First Lady Abbey Bartlet (NBC); Rachel Griffiths – Six Feet Under as Brenda Chenowith (HBO); Lena Olin – Alias as Irina Derevko (ABC)
**Outstanding Supporting Actor in a Miniseries or a Movie**: **Ben Gazzara – Hysterical Blindness as Nick Piccolo (HBO)**; Alan Arkin – The Pentagon Papers as Harry Rowen (FX); Chris Cooper – My House in Umbria as Thomas Riversmith (HBO); John Malkovich – Napoléon as Charles Maurice de Talleyrand-Périgord (A&E); Peter O'Toole – Hitler: The Rise of Evil as Paul von Hindenburg (CBS)	**Outstanding Supporting Actress in a Miniseries or a Movie**: **Gena Rowlands – Hysterical Blindness as Virginia Miller (HBO)**; Kathy Baker – Door to Door as Gladys (TNT); Anne Bancroft – The Roman Spring of Mrs. Stone as Contessa (Showtime); Juliette Lewis – Hysterical Blindness as Beth Tocyznski (HBO); Helen Mirren – Door to Door as Irene Porter (TNT)

==== Individual performances ====
Individual performances
**Outstanding Individual Performance in a Variety or Music Program**
- **Wayne Brady – Whose Line Is It Anyway? (ABC)**
  - Dennis Miller – Dennis Miller: The Raw Feed (HBO)
  - Martin Short – Primetime Glick (Comedy Central)
  - Jon Stewart – The Daily Show with Jon Stewart (Comedy Central)
  - Robin Williams – Robin Williams: Live on Broadway (HBO)

=== Directing ===
Directing
**Outstanding Directing for a Comedy Series**: **Curb Your Enthusiasm: "Krazee-Eyez Killa" – Robert B. Weide (HBO)**; Curb Your Enthusiasm: "Mary, Joseph, and Larry" – David Steinberg (HBO); Curb Your Enthusiasm: "The Nanny from Hell" – Larry Charles (HBO); Curb Your Enthusiasm: "The Special Section" – Bryan Gordon (HBO); Sex and the City: "I Love a Charade" – Michael Engler (HBO); Will & Grace: "24" – James Burrows (NBC)	**Outstanding Directing for a Drama Series**: **The West Wing: "Twenty Five" – Christopher Misiano (NBC)**; 24: "Day 2: 10:00 p.m. – 11:00 p.m." – Ian Toynton (Fox); Six Feet Under: "Nobody Sleeps" – Alan Poul (HBO); The Sopranos: "Whitecaps" – John Patterson (HBO); The Sopranos: "Whoever Did This" – Tim Van Patten (HBO)
**Outstanding Directing for a Variety, Music or Comedy Program**: **56th Annual Tony Awards – Glenn Weiss (CBS)**; 75th Annual Academy Awards – Louis J. Horvitz (ABC); Bruce Springsteen & the E Street Band – Chris Hilson (CBS); Late Show with David Letterman – Jerry Foley (CBS); Saturday Night Live: "Host: Christopher Walken" – Beth McCarthy-Miller (NBC)	**Outstanding Directing for a Miniseries, Movie or a Dramatic Special**: **Door to Door – Steven Schachter (TNT)**; Live from Baghdad – Mick Jackson (HBO); My House in Umbria – Richard Loncraine (HBO); The Roman Spring of Mrs. Stone – Robert Allan Ackerman (Showtime); Soldier's Girl – Frank Pierson (Showtime)

=== Writing ===
Writing
**Outstanding Writing for a Comedy Series**: **Everybody Loves Raymond: "Baggage" – Tucker Cawley (CBS)**; The Bernie Mac Show: "Goodbye, Dolly" – Steve Tompkins (Fox); Everybody Loves Raymond: "Counseling" – Mike Royce (CBS); Lucky: "Pilot" – Robb Cullen and Mark Cullen (FX); Sex and the City: "I Love a Charade" – Cindy Chupack and Michael Patrick King (HBO)	**Outstanding Writing for a Drama Series**: **The Sopranos: "Whitecaps" – Robin Green, Mitchell Burgess, and David Chase (HBO)**; Six Feet Under: "Twilight" – Craig Wright (HBO); The Sopranos: "Eloise" – Terence Winter (HBO); The Sopranos: "Whoever Did This" – Robin Green and Mitchell Burgess (HBO); The West Wing: "Twenty Five" – Aaron Sorkin (NBC)
**Outstanding Writing for a Variety, Music or Comedy Program**: **The Daily Show with Jon Stewart (Comedy Central)**; Late Night with Conan O'Brien (NBC); Late Show with David Letterman (CBS); Robin Williams: Live on Broadway (HBO); Saturday Night Live (NBC)	**Outstanding Writing for a Miniseries, Movie or a Dramatic Special**: **Door to Door – William H. Macy and Steven Schachter (TNT)**; Hysterical Blindness – Laura Cahill (HBO); Live from Baghdad – Robert Wiener, Richard Chapman, John Patrick Shanley, and Timothy J. Sexton (HBO); My House in Umbria – Hugh Whitemore (HBO); Normal – Jane Anderson (HBO)

== Most major nominations ==
Networks with multiple major nominations (Note: "Major" constitutes the categories listed above: Program, Acting, Directing, and Writing. Does not include the technical categories.)
Network	No. of Nominations
HBO	53
NBC	38
CBS	28

Programs with multiple major nominations
Program	Category	Network	No. of Nominations
The Sopranos	Drama	HBO	10
Everybody Loves Raymond	Comedy	CBS	8
The West Wing	Drama	NBC	8
Curb Your Enthusiasm	Comedy	HBO	7
Six Feet Under	Drama	HBO	7
Door to Door	Movie	TNT	6
Sex and the City	Comedy	HBO	6
Will & Grace	Comedy	NBC	6
My House in Umbria	Movie	HBO	5
Hysterical Blindness	Movie	HBO	4
Live from Baghdad	Movie	HBO	4
Normal	Movie	HBO	4
24	Drama	Fox	3
Alias	Drama	ABC	3
The Daily Show with Jon Stewart	Variety	Comedy Central	3
Friends	Comedy	NBC	3
Late Show with David Letterman	Variety	CBS	3
Robin Williams: Live on Broadway	Variety	HBO	3
The Roman Spring of Mrs. Stone	Movie	Showtime	3
Saturday Night Live	Variety	NBC	3
The 75th Annual Academy Awards	Variety	ABC	2
The Bernie Mac Show	Comedy	Fox	2
Bruce Springsteen & the E Street Band	Variety	CBS	2
CSI: Crime Scene Investigation	Drama	CBS	2
Frasier	Comedy	NBC	2
Hitler: The Rise of Evil	Miniseries	CBS	2
Homeless to Harvard: The Liz Murray Story	Movie	Lifetime	2
Late Night with Conan O'Brien	Variety	NBC	2
Malcolm in the Middle	Comedy	Fox	2
Napoléon	Miniseries	A&E	2

== Most major awards ==
Networks with multiple major awards
Network	No. of Awards
HBO	8
CBS	7
NBC	4
TNT	4
Comedy Central	2

Programs with multiple major awards
Program	Category	Network	No. of Awards
Door to Door	Movie	TNT	4
Everybody Loves Raymond	Comedy	CBS	4
The Sopranos	Drama	HBO	4
The Daily Show with Jon Stewart	Variety	Comedy Central	2
Hysterical Blindness	Movie	HBO	2
The West Wing	Drama	NBC	2

== Presenters ==
The awards were presented by the following people:

Presenter(s)	Role(s)
David Schwimmer; Matt LeBlanc; Matthew Perry	Presented the award for Outstanding Supporting Actress in a Comedy Series
Kiefer Sutherland	Presented the award for Outstanding Supporting Actress in a Drama Series
Jon Stewart	Presented the award for Outstanding Supporting Actor in a Comedy Series
Anthony LaPaglia; Poppy Montgomery	Presented the award for Outstanding Directing for a Drama Series
Alfre Woodard; Charles S. Dutton	Presented the award for Outstanding Writing for a Drama Series
Conan O'Brien	Presented the award for Outstanding Writing for a Comedy Series
Bryan Cranston; Jane Kaczmarek	Presented the award for Outstanding Directing for a Comedy Series
Ellen DeGeneres	Presented the award for Outstanding Individual Performance in a Variety or Music Program
Michael Chiklis	Presented the award for Outstanding Supporting Actor in a Drama Series
Bernie Mac	Presented the award for Outstanding Writing for a Variety, Music or Comedy Program
Christina Applegate	Presented the award for Outstanding Directing for a Variety, Music or Comedy Program
Alicia Silverstone; Rob Lowe	Presented the award for Outstanding Directing for a Miniseries, Movie or Dramatic Special
Allison Janney	Presented the award for Outstanding Supporting Actor in a Miniseries or Movie
Eric McCormack; Debra Messing	Presented the award for Outstanding Supporting Actress in a Miniseries or Movie
Dennis Miller	Presented the award for Outstanding Variety, Music or Comedy Series
Jeff Probst; Ryan Seacrest	Presented the award for Outstanding Variety, Music or Comedy Special
Bonnie Hunt	Presented the award for Outstanding Writing for a Miniseries, Movie or Dramatic Special
Sarah Jessica Parker	Presented the award for Outstanding Lead Actor in a Miniseries or Movie
George Lopez	Presented the award for Outstanding Reality-Competition Program
Jennifer Garner; Victor Garber	Presented the award for Outstanding Made for Television Movie
Edie Falco; James Gandolfini	Presented the award for Outstanding Lead Actress in a Miniseries or Movie
Damon Wayans	Presented the award for Outstanding Lead Actress in a Comedy Series
Ray Romano	Presented the Bob Hope Humanitarian Award to Bill Cosby
Paul Shaffer; Martin Short	Presented the award for Outstanding Lead Actor in a Comedy Series
Marg Helgenberger; William Petersen	Presented the award for Outstanding Miniseries
Helen Mirren	Presented the award for Outstanding Lead Actress in a Drama Series
Ted Danson	Presented the award for Outstanding Lead Actor in a Drama Series
William H. Macy	Presented the award for Outstanding Drama Series
Mike Myers	Presented the award for Outstanding Comedy Series

== In Memoriam ==
The annual "In Memoriam" montage was presented by Dennis Franz, to honor the TV personalities who died between late 2002 and early-to-mid 2003. Before the segment, Henry Winkler presented a small tribute to actor John Ritter. Another standalone tribute was shown for actor and host Bob Hope. The following people were included in the main tribute:

- Gregory Hines
- Robert Stack
- Michael Jeter
- Jeff Corey
- Bob Keene - production designer
- Ben Brady - producer
- Richard Crenna
- Peg Phillips
- Mike Stokey
- Jack Smight - director
- Paul Monash - writer
- Brianne Murphy - cinematographer
- Nell Carter
- Buddy Hackett
- Johnny Cash
- Roone Arledge - executive
- Edgar Scherick - producer
- Bruce Paltrow - writer, director, producer
- Katharine Hepburn
- David Bloom - journalist
- Lynne Thigpen
- James Coburn
- Hume Cronyn
- Charles Bronson
- Buddy Ebsen
- David Brinkley
- Gregory Peck
- Fred Rogers
