= The Sopranos season 4 =

Television show season

The Sopranos
- Season 4
- Season 4 DVD cover
- Starring: James Gandolfini; Lorraine Bracco; Edie Falco; Michael Imperioli; Dominic Chianese; Steven Van Zandt; Tony Sirico; Robert Iler; Jamie-Lynn Sigler; Drea de Matteo; Aida Turturro; John Ventimiglia; Federico Castelluccio; Vincent Curatola; Steve Schirripa; Kathrine Narducci; Joe Pantoliano
- No. of episodes: 13

Release
- Original network: HBO
- Original release: September 15 – December 8, 2002

Season chronology
- ← Previous; Season 3 Next → Season 5

The fourth season of the American crime drama series The Sopranos began airing on HBO on September 15, 2002, and concluded on December 8, 2002, consisting of thirteen episodes. The fourth season was released on VHS and DVD in region 1 on October 28, 2003.

The story of season four focuses on the marriage between Tony and Carmela, as Tony engages in an affair with his ex-lover's cousin Svetlana and Carmela finds herself infatuated with Furio. The increasing tension between Tony and Ralph Cifaretto comes to a violent head and Uncle Junior is again put on trial for his crimes. Adriana is forced into becoming an FBI informant, while Christopher plunges deeper into heroin addiction.

== Cast and characters ==
=== Main cast ===
- James Gandolfini as Tony Soprano, the De facto boss of the DiMeo crime family, struggling with a rogue capo, his wife, and his finances.
- Lorraine Bracco as Dr. Jennifer Melfi, Tony's therapist.
- Edie Falco as Carmela Soprano, Tony's wife, who becomes doubtful of their relationship and finances.
- Michael Imperioli as Christopher Moltisanti, a soldier and Tony's cousin by marriage, who begins using heroin regularly as Tony grooms him to be his successor.
- Dominic Chianese as Corrado "Junior" Soprano, Tony's uncle and the boss of the family, who is on trial for his crimes.
- Steven Van Zandt as Silvio Dante, the family's loyal consigliere.
- Tony Sirico as Paulie "Walnuts" Gualtieri, a short-tempered capo who begins to doubt his loyalty to Tony.
- Robert Iler as Anthony "A. J." Soprano, Jr., Tony's son.
- Jamie-Lynn Sigler as Meadow Soprano, Tony's daughter, whose relationship with her mother strains following the death of her ex-boyfriend.
- Drea de Matteo as Adriana La Cerva, Chris's fiancée, who becomes entangled with enemies of the family.
- Aida Turturro as Janice Soprano, Tony's dramatic sister who begins inserting herself into Bobby's love life.
- Federico Castelluccio as Furio Giunta, a soldier who falls in love with someone he shouldn't.
- John Ventimiglia as Artie Bucco, Tony's non-mob friend who runs a restaurant, struggling with his recent divorce and his restaurant.
- Vincent Curatola as Johnny "Sack" Sacrimoni, the underboss of the Lupertazzi family who befriends Paulie.
- Steven R. Schirripa as Bobby Baccalieri, a kind-hearted soldier who suffers a personal tragedy.
- Joe Pantoliano as Ralph Cifaretto, a violent, crude capo whose issues with Tony grow more severe.
- Kathrine Narducci as Charmaine Bucco, Artie's ex-wife.

=== Recurring cast ===
- Joseph R. Gannascoli as Vito Spatafore, a DiMeo soldier.
- Dan Grimaldi as Patsy Parisi, a DiMeo soldier.
- Sharon Angela as Rosalie Aprile, Carmela's best friend and Ralphie's girlfriend, severely depressed after the death of her son.
- Max Casella as Benny Fazio, a young DiMeo soldier.
- Robert Funaro as Eugene Pontecorvo, a DiMeo soldier.
- Matthew Del Negro as Brian Cammarata, Carmela's cousin, who tips Tony off to a lucrative opportunity.
- Tony Lip as Carmine Lupertazzi, the uncompromising boss of the Lupertazzi family.
- Matt Servitto as Dwight Harris, an FBI counter-terrorism agent who consorts with Tony.
- Maureen Van Zandt as Gabriella Dante, Silvio's wife.
- Karen Young as Robyn Sanservino, an FBI agent tasked with handling someone close to the DiMeo family.
- Lola Glaudini as Deborah Ciccerone/Danielle Ciccollela, an FBI agent who disingenuously befriends someone close to the DiMeo family.
- Alla Kliouka Schaffer as Svetlana Kirilenko, Livia's former caretaker and a source of interest for Tony.
- Leslie Bega as Valentina La Paz, Ralphie's girlfriend that Tony takes an interest in.
- Peter Riegert as Ronald Zellman, an assemblyman that Tony is friendly with.
- George Loros as Raymond Curto, a DiMeo capo and FBI informant.
- Oksana Lada as Irina Peltsin, Tony's former comare, Svetlana's cousin, and the current girlfriend of Zellman.
- Frank Pellegrino as Frank Cubitoso, the FBI agent in charge of the investigation into the DiMeo family.

== Episodes ==
Season 4 episodes
| No. overall | No. in season | Title | Directed by | Written by | Original release date | U.S. viewers (millions) |
|---|---|---|---|---|---|---|
| 40 | 1 | "For All Debts Public and Private" | Allen Coulter | David Chase | September 15, 2002 | 13.43 |
Paulie calls Johnny from prison, having been arrested on a gun charge, and complains about Tony's lack of concern. Ralphie cheats on Rosalie with Janice while having dinner at Tony's house. Tony admits to Melfi that he feels the only ways out of his business are "dead or the can" and plans to have Chris take over. He gives Chris, who is using heroin regularly, the address of the retired cop he claims killed his father, but the man insists he was not responsible when Chris follows him home. He kills him anyway and takes a twenty dollar bill from his wallet, later pinning it to his mother's fridge after a conversation about his father.
| 41 | 2 | "No Show" | John Patterson | Terence Winter and David Chase | September 22, 2002 | 11.21 |
Ralphie tells a joke regarding the weight of Johnny's wife, which Paulie's nephew repeats while visiting Paulie in prison. Chris is made temporary capo of Paulie's men, causing resentment between him and Patsy, which escalates when Patsy and Silvio steal from their no-work job against Tony's wishes. The FBI brings Adriana in and demand that she become an informant. Meadow has shown a lack of motivation since Jackie Aprile Jr.'s murder, (Note: As depicted in "Army of One".) so Melfi recommends a therapist for her to Tony. The therapist encourages Meadow's plans to take a year off of college and go to Europe, leading to an argument between Meadow and Tony about his work getting Jackie killed. Tony and Carmela return home one day to find Meadow gone, having returned to school.
| 42 | 3 | "Christopher" | Tim Van Patten | Story by : Michael Imperioli and Maria Laurino; Teleplay by : Michael Imperioli | September 29, 2002 | 10.97 |
Junior's RICO trial begins. At a pro-Italian luncheon, the guest speaker makes a point of deriding Italians involved in mafia activity, leaving the mob wives insulted. Bobby's wife Karen is killed in a car accident. Rosalie becomes even more depressed by this news, prompting Ralphie to leave her and attempt to move in with Janice. Janice visits Bobby and is moved by his sincere grief, and decides to break up with Ralphie, doing so by starting a fight and kicking him down the stairs. Paulie tells Johnny about Ralphie's joke. A Native American group protests against the local Columbus Day parade to the ire of Tony's men. The leader of the group is not moved by Ralphie's threats, and Tony is unable to convince a chief (actually a white man with a small amount of Native American blood) to stop the protest. As Silvio continues to complain, Tony annoyedly disparages the notion that everyone belongs to a victimized group.
| 43 | 4 | "The Weight" | Jack Bender | Terence Winter | October 6, 2002 | 10.67 |
Johnny's anger at the joke begins to boil over into meetings between the DiMeo and Lupertazzi families. Boss Carmine Lupertazzi approves of killing Johnny, and Silvio and Chris arrange a hit on him while Johnny puts one out on Ralphie. Johnny goes to see his father, where he will be killed, but forgets something and discovers his wife cheating on her diet. Hurt that she lied to him despite never asking her to lose weight, he calls off the hit. Melfi's son begins acting out while at college, and Elliot Kupferberg suggests that he may still feel guilt over her rape. (Note: As depicted in "Employee of the Month".) He later bumps into Tony without knowing who he is. As Carmela and Tony argue about money, she finds herself increasingly attracted to Furio, helping him buy a house and dancing with him at his housewarming party. While Tony has sex with her, she imagines hearing the music she and Furio danced to.
| 44 | 5 | "Pie-O-My" | Henry J. Bronchtein | Robin Green & Mitchell Burgess | October 13, 2002 | 9.76 |
The FBI presses Adriana for information, and she reluctantly gives them a tip about Patsy. Janice begins inserting herself into Bobby's home life, trying to pull him out of his grief lest Junior abandon him, as well as trying to get him to eat Karen's last baked ziti that he has been saving to honor her memory. When Chris is away, Adriana finds his stash of heroin and mainlines the drug for the first time. Ralphie's racehorse Pie-O-My wins all of her races. Tony begins demanding more and more of the winnings, and when the horse falls ill and Ralphie cannot pay, he gives the vet Tony's number. Tony goes to the stables, pays the vet, and sits with Pie-O-My to try and calm her.
| 45 | 6 | "Everybody Hurts" | Steve Buscemi | Michael Imperioli | October 20, 2002 | 10.46 |
After discovering that Gloria Trillo committed suicide, Tony does several kind things for people in his life to distract himself from the guilt. Artie takes a loan from Tony so he can distribute Armagnac, only for his supplier to start ignoring his calls. The man beats Artie when he tries to get his money back, and he tries to overdose on pills and calls Tony apologetically, who realizes what is happening and calls 911. Tony agrees to forgive the loan so long as Artie drops his restaurant tab and gives him the money from the man, who Furio is sent to collect from. A grateful Artie praises Tony for having apparently guessed what was going to happen from the start, which upsets him. A.J. visits the home of his new girlfriend and realizes how wealthy she is. When his friends ask him why he does not have "Don Corleone money," he responds with “I don’t know.”
| 46 | 7 | "Watching Too Much Television" | John Patterson | Story by : David Chase & Robin Green & Mitchell Burgess & Terence Winter; Teleplay by : Terence Winter and Nick Santora | October 27, 2002 | 9.72 |
Paulie is released from prison, resentful that Tony never contacted him. While watching television, Adriana gets the impression that spouses cannot be forced to testify against each other, and proposes to Chris. He storms out when she tells him she may not be able to have children, but accepts it after Tony and Silvio talk to him. Adriana learns that she was wrong about spousal privilege and joylessly unwraps her presents at her bridal shower. Carmela's cousin tips Tony off to a mortgage fraud scheme he can get in on, so he makes use of assemblyman Ronald Zellman to purchase several houses. One of them has been turned into a crack house, so Zellman pressures his anti-violence friend into sending a group of armed teenagers to scare the occupants away. After the scheme pays out, Zellman and his friend wonder what happened to their morals. Tony learns that Zellman is dating Irina Peltsin, and though unbothered by it at first, he drunkenly barges into Zellman's house and beats him.
| 47 | 8 | "Mergers and Acquisitions" | Dan Attias | Story by : David Chase & Robin Green & Mitchell Burgess & Terence Winter; Teleplay by : Lawrence Konner | November 3, 2002 | 10.97 |
Furio goes to Naples for his father's funeral, where he confesses to his uncle that he is in love with Carmela. His uncle warns him that he will have to kill Tony if he wants to be with her. Paulie's mother Nucci moves into a retirement community, where she is ostracized by a group that one of her friends is in. Paulie pays off the woman's son, but when nothing changes, he has the man's arm broken. His wife threatens to pull his mother out of the home unless she is kinder to Nucci. Ralphie's new girlfriend, Valentina La Paz, helps commission a portrait of Tony and Pie-O-My. They soon begin an affair, although he refuses to keep seeing her unless she breaks up with Ralphie, which she does. Carmela discovers one of Valentina's fake nails in Tony's clothes, and so she invests some of his money with a stockbroker and leaves the nail for him to find. He and Carmela try to get the other to admit what they have done, but neither folds.
| 48 | 9 | "Whoever Did This" | Tim Van Patten | Robin Green & Mitchell Burgess | November 10, 2002 | 9.83 |
As Junior's trial continues, Tony gets the idea to begin feigning memory loss and force a mistrial, which Junior passes off to an investigator, only to have a genuinely dazed conversation with his neighbor that he seems to forget. Ralphie's son is hit with an arrow while playing with his friend, leaving him with brain damage. Believing God is punishing his son in his stead, Ralphie asks Phil Intintola (Note: A local priest, first seen in "The Sopranos".) for advice and tries to do right by the Aprile family. The stable housing Pie-O-My burns down, resulting in her death. Realizing that the payout of the stable's insurance would cover Ralphie's medical bills, Tony confronts him in his home, leading to a lengthy struggle that ends when Tony strangles Ralphie to death. He and Chris dispose of the body.
| 49 | 10 | "The Strong, Silent Type" | Alan Taylor | Story by : David Chase; Teleplay by : Terence Winter and Robin Green & Mitchell Burgess | November 17, 2002 | 10.68 |
Chris accidentally kills Adriana's dog while high and gets robbed while trying to buy more heroin, and he hits Adriana when she suggests he go to rehab. Junior advises Tony to kill him, but he instead organizes an intervention that quickly deteriorates into Chris being beaten. Tony informs Chris that he is being moved to a rehab clinic. Tony has a hostile meeting with Johnny over the Lupertazzi family not being included in the mortgage scheme. Furio returns, and Carmela continually makes up excuses to see him. Junior's new nurse turns out to be supplied by Svetlana Kirilenko. (Note: Livia's former caretaker and Irina's cousin, first seen in "The Knight in White Satin Armor".) Tony expresses admiration for her, and the two have sex. Tony openly cries to Melfi about losing Pie-O-My and orders their portrait to be destroyed when it arrives. Paulie saves it, hanging it on his wall and having it repainted to put Tony in a "Napoleon-like" uniform.
| 50 | 11 | "Calling All Cars" | Tim Van Patten | Story by : David Chase & Robin Green & Mitchell Burgess & Terence Winter; Teleplay by : David Chase & Robin Green & Mitchell Burgess and David Flebotte | November 24, 2002 | 11.12 |
Tony dreams about Carmela driving Johnny Soprano's car with his father, Ralphie, and Gloria/Svetlana inside. Melfi suggests that it represents his desire to settle things with them, but he becomes frustrated with the seeming lack of progress in their sessions and decides to quit. Annoyed at Carmela forcing him to play with Bobby's kids, A.J. pranks them with a séance that leaves them terrified of Karen's ghost. Janice guides them to their ouija board, scaring them further. Bobby comes to her for advice, and she manipulates him into eating Karen's ziti. Tony continues to refuse Johnny a satisfying cut of the mortgage scheme. He goes to Miami to deal with Carmine's son, "Little" Carmine, who agrees to talk to his father. Tony's dream continues: he arrives at a house, where he waits outside, claiming he is there for a stonemason job. A shadowy female figure descends the stairs before Tony wakes with a start.
| 51 | 12 | "Eloise" | James Hayman | Terence Winter | December 1, 2002 | 11.07 |
Bobby picks a juror at Junior's trial to have intimidated into holding out. Carmine refuses to compromise on the mortgage scheme, and Johnny meets with Tony and implies that he should be killed. Paulie encounters Carmine and realizes he has no idea who he is despite the good word Johnny apparently put in for him. He learns that Nucci's friend keeps her money in her house, and is forced to kill her while stealing it. He gives a large cut to Tony, putting them back on good terms. After Furio and Carmela almost kiss, he nearly pushes a drunken Tony into a helicopter rotor, leaving for Italy the next day despite Tony not remembering the incident clearly. Carmela, in bad spirits, argues with Meadow about the homosexual themes in Billy Budd. The arguing continues at Meadow's birthday dinner, and she learns from A.J. about Carmela's interest in Furio. As Tony asks if Carmela is happy with Meadow growing into an independent woman, she stays silent for a moment, then murmurs "yes."
| 52 | 13 | "Whitecaps" | John Patterson | Robin Green & Mitchell Burgess and David Chase | December 8, 2002 | 12.48 |
Because of the one holdout juror, Junior's trial is declared a mistrial. Tony agrees to kill Carmine in exchange for all of the profit from the mortgage scheme, and has a clean Chris hire his former heroin dealers to do the job. Little Carmine reports that his father has conceded, and Chris has the dealers killed to prevent knowledge of the attempt from leaking. Tony purchases a house on the Jersey Shore for his family from owner Alan Sapinsly, only for Irina to call the house in revenge for Tony ending her relationship with Zellman and tell Carmela that he slept with Svetlana. Tony and Carmela argue about his infidelities and she orders him to move out. He tells Sapinsly that he no longer wants to buy the house, but he refuses to release Tony from his contract unless he pays a fee. Tony argues with Carmela again and she reveals her feelings for Furio, almost causing him to hit her. He calls Melfi, but hangs up and blocks her number when she answers. Tony has speakers installed on his boat, which he drives outside Sapinsly's house and plays loud music from. His wife begs him to release Tony from the contract.

== Reception ==
=== Critical reviews ===
On Rotten Tomatoes, the season has an approval rating of 92% based on 12 reviews, with an average rating of 9/10. The website's critics consensus reads: "The war seeps into the Sopranos household in a season of discontent, with each of these artfully rendered devils stewing in a divine comedy of their own making."

=== Awards and nominations ===
| Year | Association | Category | Nominee(s) | Result | Ref. |
|---|---|---|---|---|---|
| 2003 | Primetime Emmy Awards | Outstanding Drama Series | | Nominated | |
| 2003 | Primetime Emmy Awards | Outstanding Lead Actor in a Drama Series | James Gandolfini (episode: "Whitecaps") | Won | |
| 2003 | Primetime Emmy Awards | Outstanding Lead Actress in a Drama Series | Edie Falco (episode: "Whitecaps") | Won | |
| 2003 | Primetime Emmy Awards | Outstanding Supporting Actor in a Drama Series | Michael Imperioli (episodes: "Whoever Did This" + "The Strong, Silent Type") | Nominated | |
| 2003 | Primetime Emmy Awards | Outstanding Supporting Actor in a Drama Series | Joe Pantoliano (episodes: "Christopher" + "Whoever Did This") | Won | |
| 2003 | Primetime Emmy Awards | Outstanding Directing for a Drama Series | John Patterson (episode: "Whitecaps") | Nominated | |
| 2003 | Primetime Emmy Awards | Outstanding Directing for a Drama Series | Timothy Van Patten (episode: "Whoever Did This") | Nominated | |
| 2003 | Primetime Emmy Awards | Outstanding Writing for a Drama Series | Robin Green, Mitchell Burgess, David Chase (episode: "Whitecaps") | Won | |
| 2003 | Primetime Emmy Awards | Outstanding Writing for a Drama Series | Robin Green, Mitchell Burgess (episode: "Whoever Did This") | Nominated | |
| 2003 | Primetime Emmy Awards | Outstanding Writing for a Drama Series | Terrence Winter (episode: "Eloise") | Nominated | |
| 2003 | Golden Globe Awards | Best Drama Series | | Nominated | |
| 2003 | Golden Globe Awards | Best Actor in a Drama Series | James Gandolfini | Nominated | |
| 2003 | Golden Globe Awards | Best Actress in a Drama Series | Edie Falco | Won | |
| 2003 | Golden Globe Awards | Best Supporting Actor – Television | Michael Imperioli | Nominated | |
| 2003 | Screen Actors Guild Awards | Outstanding Ensemble in a Drama Series | Entire Cast | Nominated | |
| 2003 | Screen Actors Guild Awards | Outstanding Actor in a Drama Series | James Gandolfini | Won | |
| 2003 | Screen Actors Guild Awards | Outstanding Actress in a Drama Series | Edie Falco | Won | |
| 2003 | Screen Actors Guild Awards | Outstanding Actress in a Drama Series | Lorraine Bracco | Nominated | |
| 2003 | Directors Guild of America Awards | Outstanding Directing for a Drama Series | John Patterson (episode: "Whitecaps") | Won | |
| 2003 | Directors Guild of America Awards | Outstanding Directing for a Drama Series | Tim Van Patten (episode: "Whoever Did This") | Nominated | |
| 2003 | Writers Guild of America Awards | Best Drama Episode | Mitchell Burgess, Robin Green (Episode: "Whoever Did This") | Nominated | |
| 2003 | TCA Awards | Outstanding Achievement in Drama | | Nominated | |
| 2003 | TCA Awards | Outstanding Individual Achievement in Drama | James Gandolfini | Nominated | |
| 2003 | TCA Awards | Outstanding Individual Achievement in Drama | Edie Falco | Won | |
