= Wise Guy: David Chase and the Sopranos =

2024 American documentary film

- Poster
- Directed by: Alex Gibney
- Produced by: Alex Gibney; Ophelia Harutyunyan
- Edited by: Andy Grieve
- Production companies: HBO Documentary Films; Jigsaw Productions
- Distributed by: Max
- Release date: June 13, 2024 (Tribeca Festival)
- Running time: 160 minutes
- Country: United States
- Language: English

Wise Guy: David Chase and the Sopranos is a 2024 two-part documentary film which explores the life of David Chase and his role as the creator of The Sopranos. It is directed by Alex Gibney. It was released on HBO.

== Reception ==
Review aggregator Rotten Tomatoes reported an approval rating of 100% based on 22 reviews, with an average rating of 8.8/10. The website's critics consensus reads, "A thorough dissection of The Sopranos that gleans insight into both its production process and creator David Chase himself, Wise Guy is essential viewing for fans of one of television's landmarks." Metacritic gave the first season a weighted average score of 84 out of 100 based on 12 reviews, indicating "universal acclaim".
