= Calling All Cars (The Sopranos) =

- The Sopranos episode
- Episode no.: Season 4 Episode 11
- Directed by: Tim Van Patten
- Story by: David Chase; Robin Green; Mitchell Burgess; Terence Winter
- Teleplay by: David Chase; Robin Green; Mitchell Burgess; David Flebotte
- Cinematography by: Phil Abraham
- Production code: 411
- Original air date: November 24, 2002
- Running time: 47 minutes

Episode chronology
← Previous "The Strong, Silent Type"	Next → "Eloise"
- The Sopranos season 4

"Calling All Cars" is the 50th episode of the HBO original series The Sopranos and the 11th of the show's fourth season. Written by David Chase, Robin Green, Mitchell Burgess, and David Flebotte from a story by Chase, Green, Burgess, and Terence Winter, it was directed by Tim Van Patten and originally aired on November 24, 2002.

== Starring ==
- James Gandolfini as Tony Soprano
- Lorraine Bracco as Dr. Jennifer Melfi
- Edie Falco as Carmela Soprano
- Michael Imperioli as Christopher Moltisanti *
- Dominic Chianese as Corrado Soprano, Jr.
- Steven Van Zandt as Silvio Dante
- Tony Sirico as Paulie Gualtieri
- Robert Iler as Anthony Soprano, Jr.
- Jamie-Lynn Sigler as Meadow Soprano *
- Drea de Matteo as Adriana La Cerva *
- Aida Turturro as Janice Soprano
- Vincent Curatola as Johnny Sack
- Steven R. Schirripa as Bobby Baccalieri
- Joe Pantoliano as Ralph Cifaretto

* = credit only

=== Guest starring ===
- Ray Abruzzo as Little Carmine Lupertazzi
- Tom Aldredge as Hugh De Angelis
- Randy Barbee as Judge Whitney R. Runions
- Peter Bogdanovich as Dr. Elliot Kupferberg
- Dan Castleman as Prosecutor
- Tony Darrow as Larry Barese
- Jessica Dunphy as Devin Pillsbury
- Robert Funaro as Eugene Pontecorvo
- Joseph R. Gannascoli as Vito Spatafore
- Paul Herman as Beansie Gaeta
- Kevin Interdonato as Dogsy
- Alla Kliouka as Svetlana Kirilenko
- Tony Lip as Carmine Lupertazzi
- Joe Marruzo as Joey Peeps
- Angelo Massagli as Bobby Baccalieri III
- Richard Portnow as Attorney Melvoin
- Joe Pucillo as Beppy Scerbo
- Steve Santosusso as Anthony
- Annabella Sciorra as Gloria Trillo
- Suzanne Shepherd as Mary De Angelis
- Elena Solovey as Branca Libinsk
- George Spaventa as V.I. Trifunovitch
- Lexie Sperduto as Sophia Baccalieri
- Crystal Allen as Lisa

== Synopsis ==
Tony dreams that he is riding in the back of his father's old Cadillac, which is being driven by Carmela with Ralphie beside her. There is a caterpillar on Ralphie's bald head, then a butterfly. Tony at first sees Gloria sitting next to himself, then Svetlana. Tony discusses the dream with Dr. Melfi, who suggests that it signifies that Carmela is in control and Tony wants to square the changes in the lives of the others in the car with her. But Tony is growing dissatisfied with his therapy and rejects her interpretation. In the next session, he admits that Svetlana ended their affair because she thinks he is "high-maintenance" and too hard to cope with emotionally despite four years of therapy. Although Melfi tells him that he needs to continue, he states that it is over. She offers to shake hands; he kisses her on the cheek and leaves.

Sophia notices a cake in her father Bobby's car. When Janice asks him about it later, he tells her that he goes to Karen's grave every day, and he buried the cake on what would have been their anniversary. Janice feigns understanding of his grief.

Sophia and Bobby Jr. wonder about their mother's ghost. After a Sunday dinner at the Soprano home, Carmela demands that A.J. play a game with the two children. He takes out a Ouija board and engages in a mock séance that terrifies them. When the children are back at home, Janice uses an internet chat program to direct them to their own Ouija board. When Bobby arrives home, his children are in a terrified state, and he calls Janice for help. She tells him she had heard them using the Ouija board earlier in the day, but thought it would be improper to intervene. She uses the manufactured situation to encourage Bobby to move on and convinces him to eat his wife's last frozen baked ziti.

Junior starts to exhibit more symptoms of dementia. However, at his trial the judge denies Melvoin's motion to dismiss on the grounds of mental incompetence. Bobby reassures Junior that they will get to a juror.

Tony has a sitdown in New York City with Carmine and Johnny, who demand 40% of the profits of his HUD scam. Tony walks out but phones with a counter-offer of 5.5%, which Carmine rejects. On Carmine's orders, Joey Peeps and an associate beat up "Vic the Appraiser," who works for Tony, and tell him to start working for Carmine. Vic later gets beaten up again, this time by Vito and an associate, to convince him to work for the Soprano family.

Alone with Silvio, Tony raises the possibility of reaching out to Carmine's son, Little Carmine, in Florida through their old friend Beansie Gaeta. He voices his suspicion to Silvio that Paulie is leaking information to Johnny, and they agree not to tell him about the trip. In fact, Johnny is still treating Paulie as if they are confidants, hinting that there might be a change of leadership in New Jersey. "Carmine won't forget you," he says.

In Miami, Tony meets with Little Carmine, who agrees to travel home and talk to his father. Tony threatens action against New York should negotiations fail to yield results.

That night, Tony dreams that he follows Ralphie to an old house. Ralphie disappears; Tony then sees himself as an Italian-American immigrant, coming for a masonry job at the house. Before he enters, he sees a female figure with a shadowy face resembling his mother walking downstairs. He enters — and wakes up short of breath, sweaty, and startled. He goes out to the balcony, into the bright Miami sun, and stares at the ocean.

== First appearances ==
- Carmine "Little Carmine" Lupertazzi Jr.: capo in the Lupertazzi Family and son of the boss, Carmine Sr.

== Title reference ==
- Dr. Melfi uses the phrase "Calling all cars" when trying to reach Dr. Kupferberg after Tony quits therapy. The phrase is an old police radio dispatch call for all radio patrol cars to assist a fellow officer or to look for a suspect or situation.

== References to past episodes ==
- After A.J. scares Bobby Baccalieri III and his sister by faking a séance at the Ouija board and squeezing water on his head, Bobby reveals to both his father and Tony that A.J. had locked him in Furio Giunta's garage at Furio's housewarming party, in the episode "The Weight."

== References to other media ==
- When Bobby is lying in bed in the dark, grieving for Karen, the TV is playing The Scarlet Pimpernel (1934 film).
- Bobby Jr. is seen playing the computer game Max Payne.
- Janice talks to Bobby Jr. through AOL Instant Messenger.
- When using the Ouija board, A.J. mentions Captain Jacobus, the protagonist from the book Captain Jacobus by L. Cope Cornford.

== Cultural reference ==
- Little Carmine puzzles Tony with some talk about "Louis the Whatever's finance minister, de something" who built a château grander than the king's but ended up in prison. This is a reference to Nicolas Fouquet, the Superintendent of Finances for King Louis XIV, who built the famous Château de Vaux-le-Vicomte (which, contrary to what is stated in the episode, predates the Palace of Versailles), but was accused of embezzlement and spent the last 19 years of his life in prison.
- Tony stays at the Fontainebleau Miami Beach during his trip to Florida.
- When Janice notices the mud on Bobby's shoes, he compares her to "Marge Hingenbrender," a malapropism for Marg Helgenberger, who played forensic scientist Catherine Willows on CSI.

== Music ==
- The song played over the end credits is "Surfin' U.S.A." by The Beach Boys.
- The song played on the car radio during the opening dream sequence is Smokey Robinson's "The Tears of a Clown."
- While Tony is on the phone with Svetlana, Eric Clapton's version of "I Shot the Sheriff" is playing in the background.
- The song playing on the stereo when Carmela brings Bobby's kids to A.J.'s room is "Clocks" by Coldplay.
- The song playing in the background while Janice is on the phone with Bobby is "Roxy" by Concrete Blonde.
