= David Chase =

American writer, director and producer (born 1945)

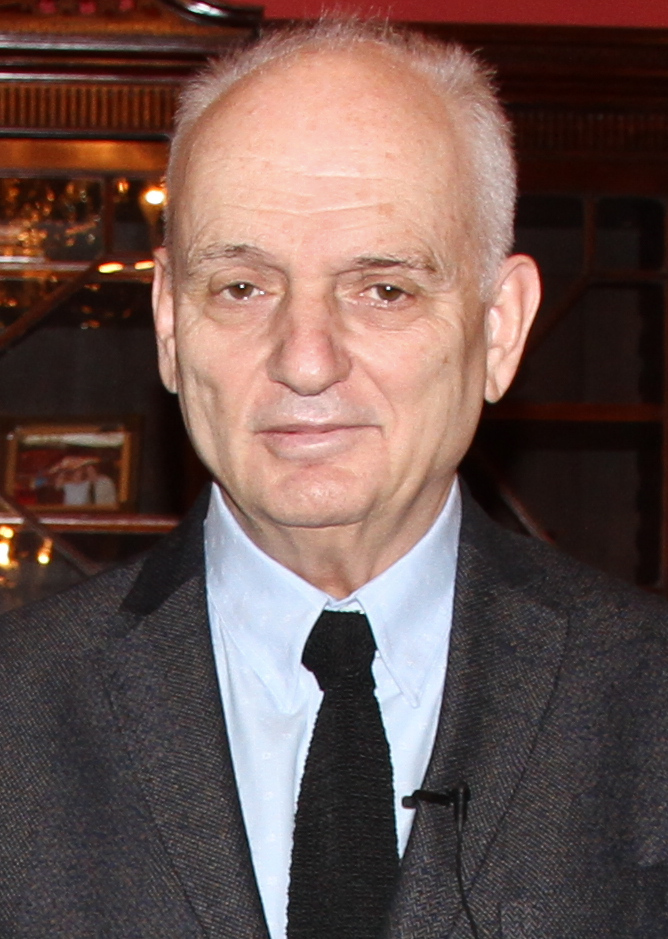
- Chase at the U.S. embassy in Dublin, 2015
- Born: David Henry Chase; August 22, 1945 (age 81); Mount Vernon, New York, U.S.
- Education: New York University (BA); Stanford University (MA)
- Occupations: Screenwriter; showrunner; director; producer
- Years active: 1969–present
- Known for: Creator of The Sopranos
- Spouse: Denise Kelly Chase
- Children: 1

David Henry Chase (born August 22, 1945) is an American writer, producer, and director. A recipient of seven Primetime Emmy Awards, he is best known for being the creator, head writer, and executive producer of the HBO drama The Sopranos, which aired for six seasons between 1999 and 2007. Chase has also produced and written for shows such as The Rockford Files, I'll Fly Away, and Northern Exposure. He created the original series Almost Grown, which aired for 10 episodes in 1988 and 1989. Chase's film debut came in 1972 with Grave of the Vampire, and his later filmography includes Not Fade Away (2012) and The Many Saints of Newark (2021), a prequel film to the TV series The Sopranos.

== Early life ==
Chase was born as an only child to Norma (née Bucco) and Enrico "Henry" Chase, both born in 1908 and hailing from Italian-American working-class families. Norma was born in Essex County, New Jersey, as one of twelve children to Marian D'Agostino and Vito Bucco, who immigrated from Ariano, Campania, and Fossacesia, Abruzzo, respectively. Henry was born in Providence, Rhode Island, as one of seven children, the son of Teresa Melfi, who was married to Giovanni DeCesare, 17 years her senior. Henry and his sister Evelina (Evelyn), however, were the biological children of Giuseppe "Joseph" Fusco, a 21-year-old Italian immigrant who had been lodging with the DeCesares since 1904. Following Evelyn's birth in 1910, Melfi and Fusco eloped to Newark, New Jersey, with their two biological children, whose surnames Melfi subsequently changed from DeCesare to Chase; the couple kept their own surnames and raised another five children under Fusco's name (although the 1940 census lists both their surnames as "Fusca"). The DeCesare family originates from Caserta, while Chase's biological grandfather, Joseph Fusco, was from Roccamonfina.

Chase grew up in a small garden apartment in Clifton, New Jersey, before moving to North Caldwell, New Jersey. His father owned Wright's Hardware in Verona, New Jersey. He grew up watching matinée crime films and was well known as a creative storyteller. He attended West Essex High School.

He has stated that he had many problems with his parents when he was a child. He says that his father was an angry man who belittled him constantly, and his mother was a "passive-aggressive drama queen" and "nervous woman who dominated any situation she was in by being so needy, and always on the verge of hysteria." He based The Sopranos character Livia Soprano on his mother, naming her after a maternal aunt.

=== Mental health and education ===
Chase struggled with panic attacks and clinical depression as a teenager, something that he dealt with into adulthood. After he graduated from high school in 1964, he attended Wake Forest University in Winston-Salem, North Carolina, where his depression worsened. "I slept 18 hours a day," he stated. He described his problems as "normal, nagging, clinical depression." He also worked as a drummer during this period and aspired to be a professional musician. After two years, he transferred to New York University where he chose to pursue a career in film—a decision that was not well received by his parents. He went on to attend Stanford University's School of Film, earning a Master of Arts degree in 1971.

== Career ==
Chase started in Hollywood as a story editor for Kolchak: The Night Stalker and then produced episodes of The Rockford Files and Northern Exposure, among other series. He also worked as a writer of 19 episodes while on The Rockford Files—a show which he worked on in various capacities for more than four years. He won several Emmy awards, including one for a television movie, Off the Minnesota Strip, the story of a runaway he scripted in 1980. His first original created series was Almost Grown in 1988, with Eve Gordon and Timothy Daly. Although the one-hour series was well received by critics, only 10 episodes aired from November 1988 to February 1989.

=== The Sopranos ===
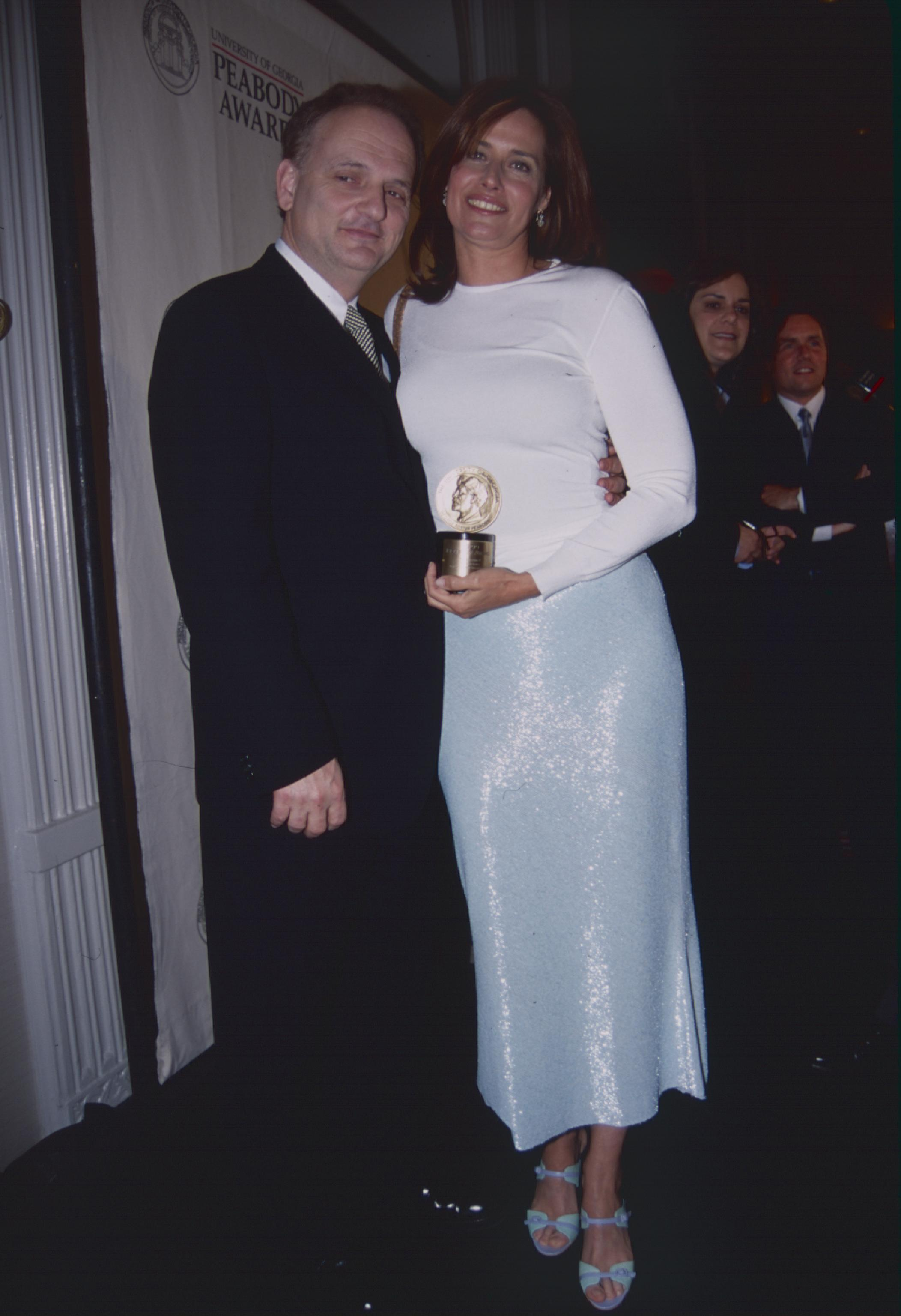
Chase with Lorraine Bracco, who played Jennifer Melfi, receiving the Peabody Award for The Sopranos in 2000

Chase worked in relative anonymity before The Sopranos debuted. The story of The Sopranos was initially conceived as a feature film about "a mobster in therapy having problems with his mother". Chase got some input from his manager Lloyd Braun and decided to adapt it into a television series. He signed a development deal in 1995 with production company Brillstein-Grey and wrote the original pilot script. He drew heavily from his personal life and his experiences growing up in New Jersey, and has stated that he tried to apply his own "family dynamic to mobsters". For instance, the tumultuous relationship between series protagonist Tony Soprano and his mother Livia is partially based on Chase's relationship with his own mother. He was also in psychotherapy at the time and modeled the character of Jennifer Melfi after his own psychiatrist.

Chase had been fascinated by organized crime and the mafia from an early age, witnessing such people growing up. He also was raised on classic gangster films such as The Public Enemy and the crime series The Untouchables. The series is partly inspired by the Richard Boiardo family, a prominent New Jersey organized crime family when Chase was growing up, and partly by New Jersey's DeCavalcante family. He has mentioned American playwrights Arthur Miller and Tennessee Williams as influences on the show's writing, and Italian director Federico Fellini as an important influence on the show's cinematic style. The series was named after high school friends of his.

Chase and producer Brad Grey pitched The Sopranos to several networks; Fox showed interest but passed on it after Chase presented them the pilot script. They eventually pitched the show to Chris Albrecht, president of HBO Original Programming, who decided to finance a pilot episode which was shot in 1997. Chase directed it himself. They finished the pilot and showed it to HBO executives, but the show was put on hold for several months. During this time, Chase, who had long experienced frustration at being unable to break out of television and into film, considered asking HBO for additional funding to shoot 45 more minutes of footage and release The Sopranos as a feature film. In December 1997, HBO decided to produce the series and ordered 12 more episodes for a 13-episode season. The show premiered on HBO on January 10, 1999, with the pilot "The Sopranos".

Thirty episodes of The Sopranos are explicitly credited to Chase; however, as the show's creator, showrunner, and head writer, he had a major role in all the scripts, including producing and touching up each script's final draft. He also directed the pilot episode and the series finale (both of which he also wrote).

Of the intentionally ambiguous final scene of the series finale that aired on June 10, 2007, Chase said, "I have no interest in explaining, defending, reinterpreting, or adding to what is there."

In 2022, Chase and Phil Abraham created a 2022 Super Bowl spot for Commonwealth / McCann with two characters from the show who appear in a 2021 New York City/New Jersey setting.

In September 2024, HBO released a two-part documentary called Wise Guy: David Chase and the Sopranos.

The Sopranos credits

Writer

- "The Sopranos" (episode 1.01)
- "46 Long" (episode 1.02)
- "College" (episode 1.05) (with Jim Manos, Jr.)
- "The Legend of Tennessee Moltisanti" (episode 1.08) (with Frank Renzulli)
- "I Dream of Jeannie Cusamano" (episode 1.13)
- "Commendatori" (episode 2.04)
- "Funhouse" (episode 2.13) (with Todd A. Kessler)
- "Mr. Ruggerio's Neighborhood" (episode 3.01)
- "Proshai, Livushka" (episode 3.02)
- "University" (episode 3.06) (story credit)
- "Amour Fou" (episode 3.12) (story credit)
- "Army of One" (episode 3.13) (with Lawrence Konner)
- "For All Debts Public and Private" (episode 4.01)
- "No Show" (episode 4.02) (with Terence Winter)
- "Watching Too Much Television" (episode 4.07) (story credit)
- "Mergers and Acquisitions" (episode 4.08) (story credit)
- "The Strong, Silent Type" (episode 4.10) (story credit)
- "Calling All Cars" (episode 4.11) (with Robin Green & Mitchell Burgess and David Flebotte)
- "Whitecaps" (episode 4.13) (with Robin Green & Mitchell Burgess)
- "Two Tonys" (episode 5.01) (with Terence Winter)
- "The Test Dream" (episode 5.11) (with Matthew Weiner)
- "All Due Respect" (episode 5.13) (with Robin Green & Mitchell Burgess)
- "Join the Club" (episode 6.02)
- "Live Free or Die" (episode 6.06) (with Robin Green & Mitchell Burgess and Terence Winter)
- "Cold Stones" (episode 6.11) (with Diane Frolov & Andrew Schneider)
- "Kaisha" (episode 6.12) (with Matthew Weiner and Terence Winter)
- "Soprano Home Movies" (episode 6.13) (with Diane Frolov & Andrew Schneider and Matthew Weiner)
- "Kennedy and Heidi" (episode 6.18) (with Matthew Weiner)
- "The Blue Comet" (episode 6.20) (with Matthew Weiner)
- "Made in America" (episode 6.21)

Director

- "The Sopranos" (episode 1.01)
- "Made in America" (episode 6.21)

Actor

Chase appeared as a man sitting at an outdoor cafe in Naples, Italy smoking a cigarette in the season two episode "Commendatori". He also appeared as an airline passenger en route to Italy in season six's "Luxury Lounge". His voice was also used over the phone in the episode "The Test Dream".

=== Not Fade Away ===
Not Fade Away (2012), Chase's feature film debut, was released on December 21, 2012. It centers on the lead singer of a teenage rock 'n' roll band (played by John Magaro) in 1960s New Jersey. Described as "a music-driven coming-of-age story," the film reunites Chase with James Gandolfini (former star of The Sopranos), who co-stars as Magaro's father. Other cast members include Bella Heathcote, Christopher McDonald, Molly Price, Lisa Lampanelli, Jack Huston, and Brad Garrett. Chase himself has described the film as about "a post-war, post-Depression-era parent who has given his kid every advantage that he didn't have growing up, but now can't help feeling jealous of the liberated, more adventurous destiny his son is able to enjoy." Another former Sopranos cast member, Steven Van Zandt, served as music supervisor and executive producer.

=== The Many Saints of Newark ===
Although Chase was "against [the movie] for a long time", Deadline Hollywood reported in March 2018 that New Line Cinema had purchased the script for The Many Saints of Newark, a prequel to The Sopranos written by Chase and fellow screenwriter Lawrence Konner. Chase said of the storyline, which centers on the 1967 Newark riots and racial tensions between the Italian-American and African-American communities, "I was interested in Newark and life in Newark at that time... I used to go down there every Saturday night for dinner with my grandparents. But the thing that interested me most was Tony's boyhood. I was interested in exploring that." Chase served as producer, and in July 2018, Alan Taylor, who previously directed episodes of the series, was hired to direct the film. The film was initially scheduled to be released on September 25, 2020, however, due to the COVID-19 pandemic in the United States, its release date was rescheduled to March 12, 2021 and later September 24, 2021 before ultimately being released on October 1, 2021.

In October 2021, he and his Chase Films production company struck a deal with WarnerMedia. In March 2024, it was revealed that he will be directing an untitled horror movie for New Line Cinema. The screenplay will be written with Terrence Winter.

== Unrealized projects ==
=== A Ribbon of Dreams ===
Chase has previously developed A Ribbon of Dreams, a miniseries for HBO. According to an HBO press release, the series' pilot would "begin in 1913 and follow two men, one a college-educated mechanical engineer, the other a cowboy with a violent past, who form an unlikely producing partnership and together become pioneers and then powers for a time in motion pictures." Specifically, the two men would "begin as employees of D.W. Griffith, and then cross career paths with John Ford, John Wayne, Raoul Walsh, Bette Davis, Billy Wilder and others who gave shape to Hollywood as it grew from the age of rough-hewn silent Westerns, to the golden era of talkies and the studio system, to the auteur movement, to television, and finally to the present day." In 2021, Chase revealed that HBO agreed to proceed with the production of the miniseries but with "a cheesy budget", to which Chase refused to agree. Therefore, Chase and HBO parted ways on the project, and A Ribbon of Dreams fell through.

== Personal life ==
After graduating from NYU in 1968, Chase moved to California and married his high school sweetheart Denise Kelly. He is the father of actress Michele DeCesare, who appeared in six of The Sopranos episodes as Hunter Scangarelo.

Chase once stated that he "loathed and despised" television shows, watching only The Sopranos and movies. However, he said in later interviews that he watched Boardwalk Empire and Mad Men, the work of former Sopranos writers and producers Terence Winter and Matthew Weiner, respectively. He said that he previously made those negative comments in part because he had been frustrated working within the confines of 1990s network television.

In 2023, Chase was inducted into the New Jersey Hall of Fame.

== Select filmography ==
=== Television ===
Year	Title	Director	Writer	Producer	Creator	Notes
1971	The Bold Ones: The Lawyers	No	Yes	No	No	Episode: "In Defense of Ellen McKay"
1974	The Magician	No	Yes	No	No	7 episodes
1974–1975	Kolchak: The Night Stalker	No	Yes	No	No	8 episodes Also story consultant
1975–1976	Switch	No	Yes	No	No	6 episodes Also story consultant
1976–1979	The Rockford Files	No	Yes	Yes	No	20 episodes
1980	The Misadventures of Sheriff Lobo	No	Story	No	No	Episode: "Perkins Bombs Out"
1980	Off the Minnesota Strip	No	Yes	Yes	No	Television film
1982	Palms Precinct	No	Yes	Executive	Yes	Pilot episode
1982	Moonlight	No	Yes	Executive	No	Television film
1986	Alfred Hitchcock Presents	Yes	Yes	No	No	Episode: "Enough Rope for Two"
1988–1989	Almost Grown	Yes	Yes	Executive	Yes	
1991–1993	I'll Fly Away	Yes	Yes	Executive	No	4 episodes
1993–1995	Northern Exposure	No	Yes	Executive	No	Wrote 1 episode
1996	The Rockford Files: If the Frame Fits...	No	No	Supervising	No	Television film
1996	The Rockford Files: Godfather Knows Best	No	Yes	Supervising	No	Television film
1996	The Rockford Files: Friends and Foul Play	No	No	Supervising	No	Television film
1996	The Rockford Files: Punishment and Crime	Yes	Yes	Supervising	No	Television film
1999–2007	The Sopranos	Yes	Yes	Executive	Yes	Directed 2 episodes, wrote the script for 24 episodes and the story for 5 episodes Also uncredited appearances in three episodes

=== Film ===
Year	Title	Director	Writer	Producer	Notes
1972	Grave of the Vampire	No	Yes	No	Based on his novel The Still Life
2012	Not Fade Away	Yes	Yes	Yes	
2021	The Many Saints of Newark	No	Yes	Yes	Also cameo appearance as Ercole "Eckley" DiMeo a.k.a. "Old Man"

=== Other credits ===
Year	Title	Role
1969	The Cut Throats	Production manager
1972	Winter Love	Unit manager
2017	BoJack Horseman	Voice role: Himself; Episode: "See Mr. Peanutbutter Run"
2024	Wise Guy: David Chase and the Sopranos	As himself; Episode: "Part 1 & 2"

== Awards and recognition ==
Primetime Emmy Awards
Year	Category	Nominated work	Result	Ref.
1978	Outstanding Drama Series	The Rockford Files (season 4)	Won	
1979	Outstanding Drama Series	The Rockford Files (season 5)	Nominated	
1980	Outstanding Drama Series	The Rockford Files (season 6)	Nominated	
1980	Outstanding Writing in a Limited Series or a Special	Off The Minnesota Strip	Won	
1992	Outstanding Drama Series	I'll Fly Away (season 1)	Nominated	
1992	Outstanding Writing for a Drama Series	I'll Fly Away (episode: "Pilot")	Nominated	
1993	Outstanding Drama Series	I'll Fly Away (season 2)	Nominated	
1994	Outstanding Drama Series	Northern Exposure (season 5)	Nominated	
1999	Outstanding Drama Series	The Sopranos (season 1)	Nominated	
1999	Outstanding Writing for a Drama Series	The Sopranos (episode: "College")	Won	
1999	Outstanding Writing for a Drama Series	The Sopranos (episode: "Pilot")	Nominated	
1999	Outstanding Directing for a Drama Series	The Sopranos (episode: "Pilot")	Nominated	
2000	Outstanding Drama Series	The Sopranos (season 2)	Nominated	
2001	Outstanding Drama Series	The Sopranos (season 3)	Nominated	
2001	Outstanding Writing for a Drama Series	The Sopranos (episode: "Funhouse")	Nominated	
2001	Outstanding Writing for a Drama Series	The Sopranos (episode: "Amour Fou")	Nominated	
2003	Outstanding Drama Series	The Sopranos (season 4)	Nominated	
2003	Outstanding Writing for a Drama Series	The Sopranos (episode: "Whitecaps")	Won	
2004	Outstanding Drama Series	The Sopranos (season 5)	Won	
2006	Outstanding Drama Series	The Sopranos (season 6 - Part 1)	Nominated	
2007	Outstanding Drama Series	The Sopranos (season 6 - Part 2)	Won	
2007	Outstanding Writing for a Drama Series	The Sopranos (episode: "Kennedy and Heidi")	Nominated	
2007	Outstanding Writing for a Drama Series	The Sopranos (episode: "Made in America")	Won	

== See also ==
- List of Primetime Emmy Award winners
