= The Strong, Silent Type =

- The Sopranos episode
- Episode no.: Season 4 Episode 10
- Directed by: Alan Taylor
- Story by: David Chase
- Teleplay by: Terence Winter; Robin Green; Mitchell Burgess
- Cinematography by: Alik Sakharov
- Production code: 410
- Original air date: November 17, 2002
- Running time: 53 minutes

Episode chronology
← Previous "Whoever Did This"	Next → "Calling All Cars"
- The Sopranos season 4

"The Strong, Silent Type" is the 49th episode of the HBO original series The Sopranos and the 10th of the show's fourth season. Its teleplay was written by Terence Winter, Robin Green, and Mitchell Burgess from a story by David Chase. It was directed by Alan Taylor and originally aired on November 17, 2002.

== Starring ==
- James Gandolfini as Tony Soprano
- Lorraine Bracco as Dr. Jennifer Melfi
- Edie Falco as Carmela Soprano
- Michael Imperioli as Christopher Moltisanti
- Dominic Chianese as Corrado Soprano, Jr.
- Steven Van Zandt as Silvio Dante
- Tony Sirico as Paulie Gualtieri
- Robert Iler as Anthony Soprano, Jr.
- Jamie-Lynn Sigler as Meadow Soprano *
- Drea de Matteo as Adriana La Cerva
- Aida Turturro as Janice Soprano *
- Federico Castelluccio as Furio Giunta
- Vincent Curatola as Johnny Sack
- Joe Pantoliano as Ralph Cifaretto **

* = credit only
** = voice only

=== Guest starring ===
- Tom Aldredge as Hugh De Angelis
- Sharon Angela as Rosalie Aprile
- Leslie Bega as Valentina La Paz
- Carl Capotorto as Little Paulie Germani
- Max Casella as Benny Fazio
- Dane Curley as Justin Cifaretto
- Joseph R. Gannascoli as Vito Spatafore
- Dan Grimaldi as Patsy Parisi
- Alla Kliouka Schaffer as Svetlana Kirilenko
- Elias Koteas as Dominic Palladino
- Marianne Leone as Joanne Moltisanti
- Richard Maldone as Ally Boy Barese
- Marissa Matrone as Ronnie Capozza
- Arthur J. Nascarella as Carlo Gervasi
- Suzanne Shepherd as Mary De Angelis
- Maureen Van Zandt as Gabriella Dante
- Karen Young as Agent Sanseverino
- Frank Santorelli as Georgie
- Elena Solovey as Branca Libinsk
- Daniel London as Eddie
- Herman Chavez as Street Punk
- Carlos Pizarro as Drug Dealer
- Cristina Ablaza as Doctor

== Synopsis ==
A week after Ralphie's "disappearance", there is still no word of him. At a dinner with Silvio and Patsy, Albert voices the crew's suspicions that Tony killed Ralphie because of a horse. At a meeting, Johnny demands that Tony let New York in on the HUD scam. When Tony refuses, Johnny threatens him. Tony calls a meeting of key family members and asserts that Johnny had Ralphie killed over the HUD scam. He stresses that no action should be taken until they have proof.

At a session with Dr. Melfi, Tony tearfully expresses his pain over losing Pie-O-My. Melfi comments that he seems to grieve more for animals than for humans. The painting of him and the horse is delivered to the Bada Bing; Tony angrily orders it destroyed. But when Paulie sees Benny and Little Paulie trying to burn it, he rescues it, over-valuing it and saying it would be an honor to have it in his house. He hangs it in his living room but later takes it down to have it modified to garb Tony in a "Napoleon-like" uniform. Paulie hangs it up again and sits with his back to it while watching television, but Tony's eyes are still on him.

Furio returns with gifts for A.J. and Meadow but, to her disappointment, nothing for Carmela. He still declines to enter the house with her. Carmela again finds a pretext to visit him at his home, again taking her unwilling chaperone A.J., who is beginning to understand the situation. Carmela confides in Rosalie, who urges her not to go any further with Furio; they both know what Tony would do if he found out.

Tony admires Svetlana, who has established her own nurses' agency, which supplies the nurse assigned to Junior. When the nurse is ill, Svetlana takes her place. Tony goes to the house one afternoon when he knows Junior is napping. They have sex on Junior's couch. Afterward, Tony is put out when she suggests they not see each other again. The regular nurse returns unexpectedly and can tell what has been going on.

Adriana breaks down in tears when she finds that Christopher, in a heroin-induced stupor, sat on her dog and killed it. Her FBI handler, Agent Sanseverino, says Adriana should urge him to go into rehab, and she has arranged for material to be sent to their home. Chris is carjacked, robbed, and beaten up while attempting to purchase heroin in a low-income barrio. When he returns home, Adriana gives him a pamphlet for a rehab clinic. He is infuriated and hits her. Badly bruised, Adriana goes to Carmela. Junior advises Tony to kill Chris, but he refuses. Instead, family and friends organize an intervention. It soon degenerates as Chris is irate with everybody in the room. Tony is enraged when he hears that Chris killed Adriana's dog. Chris verbally attacks those trying to help him and insults his own mother. Silvio and Paulie turn on him and beat him up, resulting in him being taken to the emergency room with a hairline skull fracture. Tony bluntly tells Chris that he fears his habit makes him vulnerable to flipping, and that the only reason Chris is still alive is because Tony loves him. Tony arranges for him to go to a rehab clinic in Pennsylvania and demands that he not leave until he is clean, telling him that Patsy will be watching him. Chris begins to express remorse for his actions.

== Deceased ==
- Cosette: Adriana’s dog who is killed when Christopher, high on heroin, sits on her while she was lying on a sofa. Cosette later appears with Adriana in a dream sequence in the season 6 episode "Cold Stones."

== Production ==
- Carmela (Edie Falco) sports a new, shorter hairdo beginning with this episode.

== Title reference ==
- The episode's title refers to Gary Cooper, who Tony has described as a perfect model of a man. Tony mentions Cooper several times during the series, describing him as "the strong, silent type." He first said it during therapy in the series pilot, and again in the 4th season episode "Christopher." Svetlana also displays strong and silent traits in the episode, commented on by Tony.

== Other cultural references ==
- At the start of the episode, as Christopher gets high on heroin before sitting on the dog, Cosette, the television was showing the Our Gang short film Bear Shooters (1930).
- When Adriana comes home Christopher is asleep in front of the TV, on which the 1966 movie The Oscar is being shown.
- Paulie tells Silvio he watched On the Waterfront in HD and was impressed, saying "Karl Malden's nose hairs looked like BX cables".
- The baseball game Paulie watches near the end of the episode is a Boston Red Sox–New York Yankees game played at Yankee Stadium on September 4, 2002, and won by the Yankees, 3–1. The play shown is Yankee designated hitter Jason Giambi's third-inning two-run homer off Red Sox starter Derek Lowe. Then-Red Sox left fielder Rickey Henderson is also referred to by the game's play-by-play announcer, Michael Kay.
- When Carmela and AJ are at Furio's house, AJ is wearing a Soulfly T-shirt.
- When Chris checks into rehab, the receptionist is reading the self-help book A Course in Miracles.
- Upon his return from Italy, Furio gives Meadow a copy of Dante Alighieri's Divine Comedy.
- Tony tells Svetlana that she reminds him of actress Greta Garbo.

== Music ==
- When Adriana is talking to the FBI agent, the other car stereo is playing the song "Analyse" by The Cranberries.
- When Paulie, Silvio, and Tony are playing pool at the Bada Bing, the song "Life is a Bullet" by Papa Roach is playing in the background.
- While Furio is home alone making spaghetti aglio e olio, the song "The Infinite Desire" by Al Di Meola plays in the background.
