= Whoever Did This =

- The Sopranos episode
- Episode no.: Season 4 Episode 9
- Directed by: Tim Van Patten
- Written by: Robin Green; Mitchell Burgess
- Cinematography by: Phil Abraham
- Production code: 409
- Original air date: November 10, 2002
- Running time: 56 minutes

Episode chronology
← Previous "Mergers and Acquisitions"	Next → "The Strong, Silent Type"
- The Sopranos season 4

"Whoever Did This" is the 48th episode of the HBO original series The Sopranos and the ninth of the show's fourth season. Written by Robin Green and Mitchell Burgess, and directed by Tim Van Patten, it originally aired on November 10, 2002.

== Starring ==
- James Gandolfini as Tony Soprano
- Lorraine Bracco as Dr. Jennifer Melfi *
- Edie Falco as Carmela Soprano
- Michael Imperioli as Christopher Moltisanti
- Dominic Chianese as Corrado Soprano Jr.
- Steven Van Zandt as Silvio Dante
- Tony Sirico as Paulie Gualtieri
- Robert Iler as Anthony Soprano Jr.
- Jamie-Lynn Sigler as Meadow Soprano *
- Drea de Matteo as Adriana La Cerva *
- Aida Turturro as Janice Soprano
- Steven R. Schirripa as Bobby Baccalieri
- John Ventimiglia as Artie Bucco
- Joe Pantoliano as Ralph Cifaretto

* = credit only

=== Guest starring ===
- Sharon Angela as Rosalie Aprile
- Joseph R. Gannascoli as Vito Spatafore
- Robert Funaro as Eugene Pontecorvo
- Leslie Bega as Valentina La Paz
- Murielle Arden as Elodi Colbert
- Dan Castleman as Prosecutor Castleman
- Richard D'Alessandro as Dennis Capozza
- Frances Ensemplare as Nucci Gualtieri
- Tim Kang as Dr. Harrison Wong
- Dane Curley as Justin Cifaretto
- Ellen Orchid as Dr. Sharon Zalutsky
- Frank Pando as Agent Grasso
- Richard Portnow as Harold Melvoin
- Allia Kliouka Schaffer as Svetlana Kirilenko
- Paul Schulze as Father Phil Intintola
- Matt Servitto as Agent Harris
- Susan Jhun as News Reporter Allison Pak
- Marissa Matrone as Ronnie Capozza
- Rosa Nino as Inez Muñoz
- Elena Solovey as Branca Libinsk
- Maria Elena Ramirez as Neighbor
- Manon Halliburton as Lois Pettit, the horse trainer

== Synopsis ==
Junior is hospitalized with a concussion after a boom mic sends him falling down the courthouse steps. He soon recovers and enjoys his hospital stay as a respite from the RICO trial. Tony recognizes this as a potential advantage and convinces Junior to feign dementia during his competency hearings. He gives a good performance but begins exhibiting actual signs of dementia in private.

Ralphie's 12-year-old son Justin is hit in the chest with an arrow while play-acting The Lord of the Rings with a friend, resulting in significant blood loss and brain damage. While delivering a payment to Tony, Ralphie cries openly. Tony uses Ralph's vulnerability to tell him he is seeing his former girlfriend Valentina. Expressing a desire for some kind of redemption, he meets with Father Phil and establishes a scholarship at Rutgers in Jackie Jr.'s name. Everyone sympathizes with him except Paulie. His mother recently received a traumatic prank phone call, and Paulie correctly suspects that it was from Ralphie, retaliating against him for ratting him out to Johnny.

At the stables, a fire breaks out, apparently caused by faulty electrical wiring. Pie-O-My is badly burned and has to be euthanized. Tony is devastated and immediately suspects Ralphie, later confronting him at his home over the suspicious timing of the fire: the $200,000 insurance pay-out would cover Justin's medical bills. Ralphie vehemently denies the accusation at first, but their argument escalates into a physical fight, culminating in Tony beating and strangling Ralph to death while exclaiming "She was a beautiful innocent little creature, what did she ever do to you?"

Tony calls Christopher for help; he arrives late and high on heroin. Tony never outright admits to Christopher that he killed Ralphie, and Christopher never expresses outright suspicion. Together, they dismember Ralphie's body in his bathtub with a meat cleaver, and meticulously clean the place before leaving. They bury his severed head, toupee, and hands on a farm; they throw the rest of his body off a cliff into the water below, and into a flooded quarry. After the disposal, they clean up at the Bada Bing!, where Tony passes out. He wakes up alone the following morning in the back room, where he sees a picture of deceased Bing dancer Tracee on the mirror.

== Deceased ==
- Pie-O-My and several other horses: Killed in a stable fire. The cause is deemed accidental by the fire marshal.
- Ralph Cifaretto: beaten and strangled to death by Tony Soprano due to suspicion that he caused the fire that killed Pie-O-My, which Ralph denies, but also due to his murder of Tracee, the 20-year old stripper Ralph kills in "University". His body is then dismembered and decapitated with the help of Christopher Moltisanti.

== Title reference ==
- Tony uses the phrase "whoever did this" when discussing with Christopher who exactly was responsible for Ralphie's death. Earlier, he used the phrase in reference to the guilty party responsible for the prank call to Paulie's mother.

== Connections to prior episodes ==
- When Tony confronts Ralph about the fire, he asks him about Corky Ianucci. Tony believes Ralph hired him to start the stable fire which killed Pie-O-My. Corky was also apparently used by Silvio to help blow up Vesuvio, the restaurant owned by Artie Bucco, in the pilot episode.
- When Tony looks in the mirror the morning after killing Ralph, he sees a picture of Tracee, the Bada Bing stripper whom Ralph killed in the episode "University".
- Tony and Christopher bury Ralph’s head at Mikey Palmice’s father’s farm; Christopher killed Mikey in the episode “I Dream of Jeannie Cusamano”.

== Other cultural references ==
- Carmela is seen wearing a Columbia University T-shirt when talking to Tony and her son in the kitchen.
- Corrado tells Tony the hospital is like Xanadu when compared to the courtroom.
- After Ralph's murder, Tony and Christopher watch The Last Time I Saw Paris (1954) on Ralph's television.
- Ralph mentions Shamu the whale in a passing reference to Ginny Sacrimoni.

=== "Sympathy for the Devil" Connections ===
Writers and scholars have made note of the episode's explicit references to the song "Sympathy for the Devil" by The Rolling Stones in the character's dialogue. According to Sopranos Autopsy writer Ron Bernard:

1. Ralph says “Please allow me to introduce myself” to Justin’s surgeon

2. Ralph says “Pleased to meet you” to Father Phil

3. Father Phil asks Ralph, “Were you there when Jesus Christ had his moment of doubt and pain?”

According to Bernard, "Ralph has been a demonic character throughout the series, and Green & Burgess [the episode's writers] have a bit of fun evoking our sympathy for this devilish man". Journalist Steve Michaels wrote in a 2025 article that "through repeated references to the [song], the episode tells viewers that, whatever he may be going through at the time, Ralph was always a terrible person".

== Music ==
- "When I Need You" by Leo Sayer is played when Ralph is in the bath.
- The Moonglows' original recording of "Sincerely" plays while Carmela and Rosalie dine at Vesuvio.
- The song played over the end credits is "The Man with the Harmonica" by Apollo 440. It is a cover of the Ennio Morricone score of Once Upon a Time in the West, a Sergio Leone film.

== True-crime influence ==
Jason Bautista was convicted of killing his mentally ill mother in Riverside, California, on January 14, 2003, then dumping her decapitated body with its hands removed off Ortega Highway in Orange County. Jason's half-brother Matthew Montejo, who was 15 years old when Jason killed their mother, testified in court that he helped dispose of her body and that they got the idea to chop off her head and hands to hide the crime from this episode.

== Awards ==
"Whoever Did This" was Joe Pantoliano's 2003 winning submission for the Primetime Emmy Award for Outstanding Supporting Actor in a Drama Series, along with the episode "Christopher".
