= Eloise (The Sopranos) =

- The Sopranos episode
- Episode no.: Season 4 Episode 12
- Directed by: James Hayman
- Written by: Terence Winter
- Cinematography by: Alik Sakharov
- Production code: 412
- Original air date: December 1, 2002
- Running time: 56 minutes

Episode chronology
← Previous "Calling All Cars"	Next → "Whitecaps"
- The Sopranos season 4

"Eloise" is the 51st episode of the HBO original series The Sopranos and the 12th of the show's fourth season. Written by Terence Winter and directed by James Hayman, it originally aired on December 1, 2002.

== Starring ==
- James Gandolfini as Tony Soprano
- Lorraine Bracco as Dr. Jennifer Melfi *
- Edie Falco as Carmela Soprano
- Michael Imperioli as Christopher Moltisanti *
- Dominic Chianese as Corrado Soprano, Jr.
- Steven Van Zandt as Silvio Dante
- Tony Sirico as Paulie Gualtieri
- Robert Iler as Anthony Soprano, Jr.
- Jamie-Lynn Sigler as Meadow Soprano
- Drea de Matteo as Adriana La Cerva *
- Aida Turturro as Janice Soprano *
- Federico Castelluccio as Furio Giunta
- John Ventimiglia as Artie Bucco
- Vincent Curatola as Johnny Sack
- Steven R. Schirripa as Bobby Baccalieri

* = credit only

=== Guest starring ===
- Ray Abruzzo as Little Carmine Lupertazzi
- Sharon Angela as Rosalie Aprile
- Fran Anthony as Minn Matrone
- Anna Berger as Cookie Cirillo
- Elaine Bromka as Ellen McDermott
- Carl Capotorto as Little Paulie Germani
- Max Casella as Benny Fazio
- Dan Castleman as Prosecutor Castleman
- Matthew Del Negro as Brian Cammarata
- France Esemplare as Nucci Gualtieri
- Robert Funaro as Eugene Pontecorvo
- Joseph R. Gannascoli as Vito Spatafore
- Michael Goduti as Alfie
- Jerry Grayson as Marty Schwartz
- Dan Grimaldi as Patsy Parisi
- Kevin Interdonato as Dogsy
- Will Janowitz as Finn DeTrolio
- Tony Lip as Carmine Lupertazzi
- Mark Lotito as Dave Fusco
- Bruce MacVittie as Danny Scalercio
- Jeffrey M. Marchetti as Petey
- Brian McCormack as Greg Erwitt
- Evan Neuman as Colin McDermott
- Aleksa Palladino as Allesandra
- Richard Portnow as Attorney Melvoin
- Joe Pucillo as Beppy Scerbo
- Gay Thomas-Wilson as Nurse
- Richard Vitiello as Joey Numbers
- Buddy Fitzpatrick as ER Doctor
- Chuck Lewkowicz as Foreman

== Synopsis ==
At Junior's trial, Bobby carefully chooses a juror who wears a wedding ring. Eugene and Dogsy intimidate him with carefully chosen words.

Little Carmine returns to New Jersey to talk to his father and Johnny about reducing their claim on Tony for a share of the HUD scam. Carmine will not bend. Johnny later meets Tony and Silvio and offers a minor compromise; Tony rejects it and orders Little Paulie, who takes two others with him, to vandalize Carmine's new restaurant. Carmine retaliates by using his union influence to shut down work at the warehouse project. Tony decides to wait the dispute out, expecting the financial losses on both sides will quickly force Carmine into a compromise. Johnny and Tony meet in secret; Johnny says Carmine's decisions lighten his pockets and, to Tony's astonishment, obliquely suggests that they collaborate to kill him.

Paulie has an angry confrontation with Silvio, who tells him his earnings are low and Tony is beginning to doubt his loyalty. He runs into Carmine at a wedding and greets him effusively; Paulie is shocked as he realizes that Carmine has no idea who he is, Johnny had lied about talking to Carmine about him. He learns that his mother's friend Minn keeps all her savings under her mattress. He breaks into her house thinking she is out, but she stumbles upon him in her bedroom, and he suffocates her with a pillow. He goes to Tony and gives him a large envelope of cash. They smile at each other, apparently on good terms again.

Carmela visits Furio's house, alone, to discuss decorating; it seems they are going to kiss, but they are interrupted by one of her father's contractors. They make a "date" to choose the tiles of the house together. With Tony and other members of the crew, Furio visits an Indian casino in Connecticut. While most of the others carouse, he stands aloof. Later, as the drunken crew prepare to board the casino's helicopter for the flight home, Furio grabs Tony and appears barely able to restrain himself from shoving him into the spinning tail rotor. He tells the baffled Tony he was standing too close to the blades. The next morning, he does not come to collect Tony: he has abruptly returned to Italy. Tony, who cannot clearly remember what happened the previous evening, complains that he has lost one of his key men.

Carmela becomes unhappy and bad-tempered. A family dinner to meet Meadow's new boyfriend, Finn DeTrolio, dispirits her. She is shocked by the notion that there are homosexual themes in Billy Budd, the book A.J. is studying, and argues about it with Meadow and her roommates. The antagonism spills over into their next meeting, a mother-daughter birthday meal at the Plaza Hotel. A.J. tells Meadow about their mother's visits to Furio; he does not understand what they imply, but she does. Tony admits to Meadow that he was previously seeing a psychiatrist, and explains a possible source of her mother's tension. He affectionately sends Meadow off on her vacation.

Later, Tony asks Carmela if seeing Meadow mature into an independent woman is not all she ever wanted. Carmela stares at a wall and answers in an emotionless tone of voice, "Yes."

== First appearance ==
- Finn DeTrolio: Meadow's new boyfriend, who is looking to go to dental school.

== Absent ==
- Christopher Moltisanti: This is the second episode that does not feature Michael Imperioli as Christopher, who was sent to a rehabilitation facility two episodes prior.

== Deceased ==
- Minn Matrone: suffocated by Paulie after he attempted to steal her money and she caught him in the act.

== Final appearance ==
- Furio Giunta: a DiMeo crime family soldier imported from Annalisa Zucca's Camorra family in Italy. Furio is only mentioned in future episodes.

== Title reference ==
- The title refers to the portrait Eloise at the Plaza Hotel, which is based on the books of the same name. Carmela and Meadow have a tradition, mentioned in the pilot episode, of eating lunch while seated in front of this painting.

== References to other media and events ==
- There is a poster for Topdog/Underdog, the 2002 Pulitzer Prize winning play by Suzan-Lori Parks, hanging in Meadow's new apartment.
- As Meadow mentions going on a ski trip with her friends, Carmela warns her to be careful, and to remember what happened to Sonny Bono. Singer, actor, and politician Bono died in a skiing accident in January 1998.
- The Soprano family and Meadow's friends discuss the Herman Melville novel Billy Budd and whether or not a homosexual subtext can be found in it.
- A.J. has several posters of nu metal bands visible around his room such as Fear Factory, Slipknot, Coal Chamber, and Limp Bizkit when the Baccalieri children come to visit, and when Meadow visits him.
- A.J. reads a translation of Thomas Mann's novella Death in Venice.
- A.J. wears a Primal Scream Xtrmntr T-shirt whilst talking to Meadow in his bedroom.
- Near the end of the episode, Carmela watches How to Marry a Millionaire on TV.
- Furio wears a S.S.C. Napoli shirt and tracksuit when he goes to the Sopranos' house to pick up Tony.
- Meadow addresses her mother as "Mrs. Danvers" when Carmela makes a comment about her physical relationship with Finn, the housekeeper in Rebecca who disapproves of her employer's new wife.
- Meadow's roommate claims to be an "Infanta de gracia" as the descendant of a Spanish countess. In reality, the title of Infanta is only given to the king's daughters, and a title de gracia is one awarded personally by the King.

== Production ==
During filming for this episode lead actor James Gandolfini absconded from the production for four days, causing the shooting of Furio's final appearance at Westchester County Airport to be rescheduled.

== Music ==
- The song played during the Soprano family's visit to Meadow in New York is "New Slang" by The Shins.
- The song played in the background of a scene between Silvio and Paulie is Metallica's cover of "The Small Hours" by Holocaust.
- The song played at the Bada Bing office when Paulie gives Tony a large envelope of cash (after the murder and robbery of Minn Matrone) is "Real Fonky Time" by Dax Riders.
- The song played over the end credits is "Little Bird" (Live version) by Annie Lennox.
- The harp music playing in the background as Carmela and Meadow eat lunch is from the first movement of the Harp Concerto in B Flat Major, HWV 294 by Georg Friedrich Handel.
- The song played during the wedding reception Paulie talks to Carmine is "Tropico Main Theme Los Parranderos" by Daniel Indart.
- The song played on the radio when the HUD job site is shut down is "Free As The Wind" by The Brooklyn Bridge.
