= Whitecaps (The Sopranos) =

- The Sopranos episode
- Episode no.: Season 4 Episode 13
- Directed by: John Patterson
- Written by: David Chase; Robin Green; Mitchell Burgess
- Cinematography by: Phil Abraham
- Production code: 413
- Original air date: December 8, 2002
- Running time: 75 minutes

Episode chronology
← Previous "Eloise"	Next → "Two Tonys"
- The Sopranos season 4

"Whitecaps" is the 52nd episode of the HBO television series The Sopranos, and the 13th and final episode of the show's fourth season. Written by the series creator/executive producer David Chase with executive producers Robin Green and Mitchell Burgess, it was directed by longtime series director John Patterson.

Originally aired in the U.S. on December 8, 2002, the episode attracted nearly 12.5 million viewers, more in its timeslot than any competing program on broadcast TV. Reviews of the episode were generally positive, and some publications ranked it among the best in the series.

== Starring ==
- James Gandolfini as Tony Soprano
- Lorraine Bracco as Dr. Jennifer Melfi
- Edie Falco as Carmela Soprano
- Michael Imperioli as Christopher Moltisanti
- Dominic Chianese as Corrado Soprano Jr.
- Steven Van Zandt as Silvio Dante
- Tony Sirico as Paulie Gualtieri
- Robert Iler as Anthony Soprano Jr.
- Jamie-Lynn Sigler as Meadow Soprano
- Drea de Matteo as Adriana La Cerva
- Aida Turturro as Janice Soprano
- John Ventimiglia as Artie Bucco
- Vincent Curatola as Johnny Sack
- Steven R. Schirripa as Bobby Baccalieri

=== Guest starring ===
- Tom Aldredge as Hugh De Angelis
- Bruce Altman as Alan Sapinsly
- Liz Larsen as Patricia "Trish" Reingold-Sapinsly
- Randy Barbee as The Judge
- Denise Borino as Ginny Sack
- Carl Capotorto as Little Paulie Germani
- Max Casella as Benny Fazio
- Dan Castleman as Prosecutor Castleman
- Dan Grimaldi as Patsy Parisi
- Alla Kliouka as Svetlana Kirilenko
- Will Janowitz as Finn DeTrolio
- Tony Lip as Carmine Lupertazzi
- Tony Darrow as Larry Barese
- Bruce MacVittie as Danny Scalercio
- Jeffrey M. Marchetti as Petey
- Richard Portnow as Harold Melvoin
- Joe Pucillo as Beppy Scerbo
- Oksana Lada as Irina Peltsin
- Curtiss Cook as Credenso Curtis
- Universal as Stanley Johnson
- Cynthia Darlow as Virginia Lupo
- Robert LuPone as Dr. Cusamano
- Karen Young as Agent Robyn Sanseverino
- Frank Pando as Agent Grasso
- Matt Servitto as Agent Harris

== Synopsis ==
With the Esplanade project shut down, Johnny is worried about his lost revenue. Tony declines to move against Carmine, but when Johnny offers generous concessions, he relents. Christopher returns from rehab in better shape and with a positive attitude. Tony asks him to deal with Carmine and make it look like "an outside job"; Christopher pays two heroin dealers and delivers instructions for the hit. However, Carmine unexpectedly changes his mind and offers to negotiate. He agrees to accept just 15% while praising Little Carmine for his role in the negotiations. Though Johnny still intends to go through with the hit, Tony decides against it and orders Christopher to silence — kill — the hired guns. When Tony and Johnny meet again, Johnny expresses his resentment and anger at Tony for backing out of their agreement. Tony says he still considers him a friend. They embrace without warmth.

Thanks to juror intimidation, Junior is freed following a mistrial. As Bobby and Janice celebrate amorously, Junior, distrusting Janice, finds a pretext to stop them.

Adriana is once again questioned by federal agents after Christopher returns from rehab. She passes on false information about Ralphie which she has heard from Christopher.

Tony takes Carmela on a surprise trip to "Whitecaps," a house on the Jersey Shore he is thinking of buying. At first hesitant, Carmela is eventually delighted; she and Tony walk on the beach and kiss. Tony meets the house's owner, Alan Sapinsly, an attorney, and offers cash in the shortest possible time allowed by law. Sapinsly calls the current buyer, who is having difficulty obtaining a mortgage, and threatens and negotiates his way out of their contract.

Irina drunk dials Carmela, brags about Tony's relations with her, and tells her he also had sex with Svetlana. This causes Carmela extreme distress and when Tony returns home she is hurling his possessions from an upstairs window. She tells Tony that he has embarrassed her for years with his infidelity and tells him to leave the house, while Tony retorts that she stole the cash he had hidden in the birdseed. He goes to Irina's home and finds Svetlana, who explains that soon after Tony humiliated Zellman in front of Irina, their relationship ended. Tony spends the night at Whitecaps and explains to Sapinsly that he no longer wishes to buy the house, but Sapinsly declines to release him from the contract.

Meadow argues with her mother about the separation, asking her how she could "eat shit" from Tony for so many years. Tony returns home and becomes violent when Carmela tells him to leave; she threatens to call a lawyer and get a restraining order. A.J. helps Tony clear the home theater so that he can stay there.

As Tony lies in the pool, Carmela confronts him about a minor annoyance, which escalates into another argument in which she reveals her feelings for Furio. Tony, at first incredulous, again becomes violent and almost strikes her, but restrains himself and punches a hole in the wall beside her head. He tells Carmela he looked for women with different qualities from her; she retorts that he hardly knew most of the women he slept with.

Tony calls Dr. Melfi, but hangs up when she answers. She tries to call him back but his number is blocked. He tells the family he has decided to move out completely. He embraces his children. Meadow cries in her bedroom.

Sapinsly calls Tony and tells him that he will release him from the sale but will keep the $200,000 deposit. He offers to negotiate, but Tony declines. Benny and Little Paulie take the speakers out of Tony's home theater, install them on Tony's boat, anchor it just offshore from Sapinsly’s house and, at lunchtime, play music very loud. The Sapinslys try to ignore it. At night, as they sit on the patio, the music starts again. Sapinsly's wife yells at him to pay back Tony's deposit.

== Deceased ==
- Credenzo Curtis and Stanley Johnson: shot by Benny Fazio and Peter LaRosa in the Meadowlands to ensure their silence about the canceled Carmine hit.

== Title reference ==
- "Whitecaps" is the name of the property Tony plans to buy for his family.
- Whitecaps also refers to the crest of waves that break into sea foam. Whitecaps on water indicate rough sailing or trouble ahead. Like the choppy waters, Tony and Carmela's marriage has become unstable.

== Production ==
- "Whitecaps" is the longest episode of the series, running 75 minutes.

== References to past episodes ==
- Tony brings up Carmela's telling him he was going to hell when he was first being examined for an MRI for his collapses (this occurred in the show's pilot episode).
- Carmela mentions that Tony told her Svetlana came from an agency, which happened in "Mr. Ruggerio's Neighborhood." She also says they drank vodka on the night Tony's mother died, which was in "Proshai, Livushka."
- Meadow has a flashback to when she complained about there not being food in the house in "University."

== Cultural references ==
- When Johnny Sack and Tony meet at an OfficeMax to discuss potentially assassinating Carmine Lupertazzi, Johnny paraphrases a line from The Beatles' song, "Hey Jude," saying, "I'll take a sad song and make it better."
- Johnny Sack intimates that with Carmine's assassination there would be "differences between this and Castellano," in reference to the assassination of New York Gambino crime family Boss Paul Castellano by John Gotti, who subsequently became boss in 1986.
- When Tony first sees Christopher after the latter's release from rehab, he says, "Hey, Jack Lemmon! How's Lee Remick?" This refers to the film Days of Wine and Roses (1962), which deals with alcoholism and recovery.
- While in the pool, Tony responds to Carmela's complaint about the seats being left on the lawn being bad for the grass by quoting the Mulwray's Chinese groundskeeper's line about "very bad for grass" from the film Chinatown.
- When fighting with Tony in the pool house, Carmela says angrily, "Who knew? All this time, you really wanted Tracy and Hepburn."
- Carmine goes mall walking in Kings Plaza, Brooklyn, entering at the "Macy's entrance, Avenue U and Flatbush." In reality, there is a Macy's entrance at the intersection of Avenue U and East 54th Street; Flatbush and U intersect at the west corner of the mall.
- Johnny Sack says to Tony angrily, "Creeps on this petty pace...", misquoting Shakespeare's Macbeth (Act 5, Scene 5, line 20).
- When explaining his decision to call off the hit on Carmine, Tony warns Johnny Sack they need to avoid causing a "shootout at the OK Corral," referencing the infamous 1881 gunfight.

== Music ==
- "Layla" by Derek and the Dominos is playing in Tony's truck when he runs over his golf clubs in his driveway.
- The song played while Tony and Christopher are at Nuovo Vesuvio is "Oh, What A Night" by The Dells.
- The song playing in the background at the Bada Bing back office is "Camouflage of Righteousness" by Little Steven. Little Steven is Steven Van Zandt, who plays Silvio Dante.
- When Janice and Bobby are dancing in Junior's kitchen, they sing/hum part of Sonny and Cher's "I Got You, Babe."
- The song played over the end credits is "I Love Paris (Vegas)" by Dean Martin. It is followed by the instrumental piece, "I Have Dreamed" from the Rodgers & Hammerstein musical The King and I, performed by Fantastic Strings.

== Reception ==
=== Viewership ===
On its original airdate, nearly 12.5 million viewers watched the episode on HBO. Additionally, the episode earned higher ratings than any broadcast network program in its timeslot.

=== Critical response ===
For The Star-Ledger in Newark, New Jersey, Alan Sepinwall described the episode as "short on gunplay but long on emotional darts thrown by Mr. and Mrs. Soprano" and praised the dramatization of characters' conflict as "more gripping than any mob-sanctioned hit ever could have been"; however, Sepinwall criticized certain subplots as adding little substance. Bruce Fretts of Entertainment Weekly called the episode "a microcosm for the entire season: occasionally brilliant, frequently tangential, and frustratingly anticlimactic" and considered the focus on the marital conflict between Tony and Carmela Soprano more fit for Scenes From a Marriage than The Sopranos.

"Whitecaps" has been ranked in some lists of top Sopranos episodes or best TV in general. Brian Ford Sullivan of The Futon Critic ranked "Whitecaps" eleventh out of the 50 best TV episodes of 2002, praising the performances of Falco and Gandolfini as "a magnificent example of acting at its finest". After The Sopranos ended in 2007, Entertainment Weekly placed "Whitecaps" #3 on their list of the 10 greatest The Sopranos episodes; TIME placed it at #4.

=== Awards ===
- James Gandolfini won his third Primetime Emmy Award for Outstanding Lead Actor in a Drama Series for his performance in this episode. Gandolfini also won the Screen Actors Guild Award for Outstanding Performance by a Male Actor in a Drama Series for his work in the fourth season as well.
- Edie Falco won her third Primetime Emmy Award for Outstanding Lead Actress in a Drama Series for her performance in this episode. For her role as Carmela, she also won the Golden Globe Award for Best Actress – Television Series: Drama, the Screen Actors Guild Award for Outstanding Performance by a Female Actor in a Drama Series, and was the first female winner of the TCA Award for Individual Achievement in Drama, a feat that would later be accomplished by Julianna Margulies as well for The Good Wife in 2010.
- Mitchell Burgess, David Chase, and Robin Green won the Primetime Emmy Award for Outstanding Writing for a Drama Series for their work on this episode.
- John Patterson won the Directors Guild of America Award for Outstanding Directing – Drama Series for his work on this episode.
