= List of The Sopranos episodes =

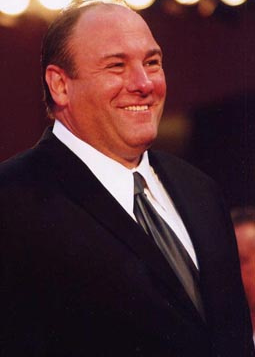
James Gandolfini is the only cast member to appear in all 86 episodes of the series.

The Sopranos is an American crime drama television series created by David Chase. The series follows Tony Soprano (James Gandolfini), an Italian-American mobster, as he struggles with various personal and professional obstacles. It also explores Tony's relationships with members of his biological and criminal families, most notably his wife Carmela (Edie Falco) and his protégé, Christopher Moltisanti (Michael Imperioli). The show begins when Tony begins therapy with Dr. Jennifer Melfi (Lorraine Bracco) after suffering a panic attack.

The series premiered on January 10, 1999, on HBO and concluded on June 10, 2007. Broadcast syndication followed in the United States and internationally. The first five seasons of the series each consisted of 13 episodes, while the final season consisted of 21 episodes aired in two parts. Unlike most American shows at the time, which typically took a four-month hiatus between seasons, The Sopranos took longer hiatuses between its seasons. Season four, for example, premiered 16 months after the third season finale, and the sixth season returned almost two years after the end of season five. Episodes were broadcast on Sundays at 9:00 pm Eastern Time with an average length of 55 minutes per episode. All six seasons are available on DVD and Blu-ray, with the sixth season being sold in two parts. During the course of the series, 86 episodes of The Sopranos aired over six seasons.

The series was released to widespread critical acclaim and received numerous accolades. It is often credited with ushering in the Second Golden Age of Television and is considered among the most influential series ever. Since its conclusion, The Sopranos has been cited by some as the greatest television series of all time, with TV Guide and Rolling Stone naming it the best series of all time in 2013 and 2022 respectively.

== Series overview ==
Season	Episodes		Originally released	
Season	Episodes		First released	Last released
1	13		January 10, 1999	April 4, 1999
2	13		January 16, 2000	April 9, 2000
3	13		March 4, 2001	May 20, 2001
4	13		September 15, 2002	December 8, 2002
5	13		March 7, 2004	June 6, 2004
6	21	12	March 12, 2006	June 4, 2006
6	21	9	April 8, 2007	June 10, 2007

== Episodes ==
=== Season 1 (1999) ===
Season 1 episodes
No. overall	No. in season	Title	Directed by	Written by	Original release date	U.S. viewers (millions)
1	1	"The Sopranos"	David Chase	David Chase	January 10, 1999	3.45
2	2	"46 Long"	Dan Attias	David Chase	January 17, 1999	N/A
3	3	"Denial, Anger, Acceptance"	Nick Gomez	Mark Saraceni	January 24, 1999	N/A
4	4	"Meadowlands"	John Patterson	Jason Cahill	January 31, 1999	N/A
5	5	"College"	Allen Coulter	James Manos Jr. and David Chase	February 7, 1999	N/A
6	6	"Pax Soprana"	Alan Taylor	Frank Renzulli	February 14, 1999	N/A
7	7	"Down Neck"	Lorraine Senna	Robin Green & Mitchell Burgess	February 21, 1999	N/A
8	8	"The Legend of Tennessee Moltisanti"	Tim Van Patten	Frank Renzulli and David Chase	February 28, 1999	N/A
9	9	"Boca"	Andy Wolk	Jason Cahill and Robin Green & Mitchell Burgess	March 7, 1999	N/A
10	10	"A Hit Is a Hit"	Matthew Penn	Joe Bosso and Frank Renzulli	March 14, 1999	N/A
11	11	"Nobody Knows Anything"	Henry J. Bronchtein	Frank Renzulli	March 21, 1999	N/A
12	12	"Isabella"	Allen Coulter	Robin Green & Mitchell Burgess	March 28, 1999	4.19
13	13	"I Dream of Jeannie Cusamano"	John Patterson	David Chase	April 4, 1999	5.22

=== Season 2 (2000) ===
Season 2 episodes
No. overall	No. in season	Title	Directed by	Written by	Original release date	U.S. viewers (millions)
14	1	"Guy Walks into a Psychiatrist's Office..."	Allen Coulter	Jason Cahill	January 16, 2000	7.64
15	2	"Do Not Resuscitate"	Martin Bruestle	Robin Green & Mitchell Burgess and Frank Renzulli	January 23, 2000	5.33
16	3	"Toodle-Fucking-Oo"	Lee Tamahori	Frank Renzulli	January 30, 2000	5.60
17	4	"Commendatori"	Tim Van Patten	David Chase	February 6, 2000	7.16
18	5	"Big Girls Don't Cry"	Tim Van Patten	Terence Winter	February 13, 2000	5.34
19	6	"The Happy Wanderer"	John Patterson	Frank Renzulli	February 20, 2000	5.83
20	7	"D-Girl"	Allen Coulter	Todd A. Kessler	February 27, 2000	6.66
21	8	"Full Leather Jacket"	Allen Coulter	Robin Green & Mitchell Burgess	March 5, 2000	6.29
22	9	"From Where to Eternity"	Henry J. Bronchtein	Michael Imperioli	March 12, 2000	7.18
23	10	"Bust Out"	John Patterson	Frank Renzulli and Robin Green & Mitchell Burgess	March 19, 2000	7.62
24	11	"House Arrest"	Tim Van Patten	Terence Winter	March 26, 2000	5.51
25	12	"The Knight in White Satin Armor"	Allen Coulter	Robin Green & Mitchell Burgess	April 2, 2000	5.44
26	13	"Funhouse"	John Patterson	David Chase and Todd A. Kessler	April 9, 2000	8.97

=== Season 3 (2001) ===
Season 3 episodes
No. overall	No. in season	Title	Directed by	Written by	Original release date	U.S. viewers (millions)
27	1	"Mr. Ruggerio's Neighborhood"	Allen Coulter	David Chase	March 4, 2001	11.26
28	2	"Proshai, Livushka"	Tim Van Patten	David Chase	March 4, 2001	11.35
29	3	"Fortunate Son"	Henry J. Bronchtein	Todd A. Kessler	March 11, 2001	8.37
30	4	"Employee of the Month"	John Patterson	Robin Green & Mitchell Burgess	March 18, 2001	7.96
31	5	"Another Toothpick"	Jack Bender	Terence Winter	March 25, 2001	7.40
32	6	"University"	Allen Coulter	Story by : David Chase & Terence Winter & Todd A. Kessler and Robin Green & Mitchell Burgess; Teleplay by : Terence Winter and Salvatore J. Stabile	April 1, 2001	8.44
33	7	"Second Opinion"	Tim Van Patten	Lawrence Konner	April 8, 2001	9.21
34	8	"He Is Risen"	Allen Coulter	Robin Green & Mitchell Burgess and Todd A. Kessler	April 15, 2001	8.60
35	9	"The Telltale Moozadell"	Dan Attias	Michael Imperioli	April 22, 2001	8.64
36	10	"...To Save Us All from Satan's Power"	Jack Bender	Robin Green & Mitchell Burgess	April 29, 2001	8.44
37	11	"Pine Barrens"	Steve Buscemi	Story by : Tim Van Patten & Terence Winter; Teleplay by : Terence Winter	May 6, 2001	8.79
38	12	"Amour Fou"	Tim Van Patten	Story by : David Chase; Teleplay by : Frank Renzulli	May 13, 2001	5.81 (Note: Denotes individual program numbers were not available so household viewers are listed instead.)
39	13	"Army of One"	John Patterson	David Chase & Lawrence Konner	May 20, 2001	9.46

=== Season 4 (2002) ===
Season 4 episodes
No. overall	No. in season	Title	Directed by	Written by	Original release date	U.S. viewers (millions)
40	1	"For All Debts Public and Private"	Allen Coulter	David Chase	September 15, 2002	13.43
41	2	"No Show"	John Patterson	Terence Winter and David Chase	September 22, 2002	11.21
42	3	"Christopher"	Tim Van Patten	Story by : Michael Imperioli and Maria Laurino; Teleplay by : Michael Imperioli	September 29, 2002	10.97
43	4	"The Weight"	Jack Bender	Terence Winter	October 6, 2002	10.67
44	5	"Pie-O-My"	Henry J. Bronchtein	Robin Green & Mitchell Burgess	October 13, 2002	9.76
45	6	"Everybody Hurts"	Steve Buscemi	Michael Imperioli	October 20, 2002	10.46
46	7	"Watching Too Much Television"	John Patterson	Story by : David Chase & Robin Green & Mitchell Burgess & Terence Winter; Teleplay by : Terence Winter and Nick Santora	October 27, 2002	9.72
47	8	"Mergers and Acquisitions"	Dan Attias	Story by : David Chase & Robin Green & Mitchell Burgess & Terence Winter; Teleplay by : Lawrence Konner	November 3, 2002	10.97
48	9	"Whoever Did This"	Tim Van Patten	Robin Green & Mitchell Burgess	November 10, 2002	9.83
49	10	"The Strong, Silent Type"	Alan Taylor	Story by : David Chase; Teleplay by : Terence Winter and Robin Green & Mitchell Burgess	November 17, 2002	10.68
50	11	"Calling All Cars"	Tim Van Patten	Story by : David Chase & Robin Green & Mitchell Burgess & Terence Winter; Teleplay by : David Chase & Robin Green & Mitchell Burgess and David Flebotte	November 24, 2002	11.12
51	12	"Eloise"	James Hayman	Terence Winter	December 1, 2002	11.07
52	13	"Whitecaps"	John Patterson	Robin Green & Mitchell Burgess and David Chase	December 8, 2002	12.48

=== Season 5 (2004) ===
Season 5 episodes
No. overall	No. in season	Title	Directed by	Written by	Original release date	U.S. viewers (millions)
53	1	"Two Tonys"	Tim Van Patten	Terence Winter and David Chase	March 7, 2004	12.14
54	2	"Rat Pack"	Alan Taylor	Matthew Weiner	March 14, 2004	9.97
55	3	"Where's Johnny?"	John Patterson	Michael Caleo	March 21, 2004	10.11
56	4	"All Happy Families..."	Rodrigo García	Toni Kalem	March 28, 2004	9.69
57	5	"Irregular Around the Margins"	Allen Coulter	Robin Green & Mitchell Burgess	April 4, 2004	9.75
58	6	"Sentimental Education"	Peter Bogdanovich	Matthew Weiner	April 11, 2004	9.93
59	7	"In Camelot"	Steve Buscemi	Terence Winter	April 18, 2004	9.08
60	8	"Marco Polo"	John Patterson	Michael Imperioli	April 25, 2004	9.99
61	9	"Unidentified Black Males"	Tim Van Patten	Matthew Weiner and Terence Winter	May 2, 2004	8.96
62	10	"Cold Cuts"	Mike Figgis	Robin Green & Mitchell Burgess	May 9, 2004	8.48
63	11	"The Test Dream"	Allen Coulter	David Chase and Matthew Weiner	May 16, 2004	8.81
64	12	"Long Term Parking"	Tim Van Patten	Terence Winter	May 23, 2004	9.53
65	13	"All Due Respect"	John Patterson	David Chase and Robin Green & Mitchell Burgess	June 6, 2004	10.98

=== Season 6 (2006–07) ===
Season 6 episodes
No. overall	No. in season	Title	Directed by	Written by	Original release date	U.S. viewers (millions)
Part I
66	1	"Members Only"	Tim Van Patten	Terence Winter	March 12, 2006	9.47
67	2	"Join the Club"	David Nutter	David Chase	March 19, 2006	9.18
68	3	"Mayham"	Jack Bender	Matthew Weiner	March 26, 2006	8.93
69	4	"The Fleshy Part of the Thigh"	Alan Taylor	Diane Frolov & Andrew Schneider	April 2, 2006	8.83
70	5	"Mr. & Mrs. John Sacrimoni Request..."	Steve Buscemi	Terence Winter	April 9, 2006	8.58
71	6	"Live Free or Die"	Tim Van Patten	David Chase & Terence Winter and Robin Green & Mitchell Burgess	April 16, 2006	7.94
72	7	"Luxury Lounge"	Danny Leiner	Matthew Weiner	April 23, 2006	8.49
73	8	"Johnny Cakes"	Tim Van Patten	Diane Frolov & Andrew Schneider	April 30, 2006	8.54
74	9	"The Ride"	Alan Taylor	Terence Winter	May 7, 2006	8.49
75	10	"Moe n' Joe"	Steve Shill	Matthew Weiner	May 14, 2006	8.13
76	11	"Cold Stones"	Tim Van Patten	Diane Frolov & Andrew Schneider and David Chase	May 21, 2006	8.18
77	12	"Kaisha"	Alan Taylor	Terence Winter and David Chase & Matthew Weiner	June 4, 2006	8.91
Part II
78	13	"Soprano Home Movies"	Tim Van Patten	Diane Frolov & Andrew Schneider and David Chase & Matthew Weiner	April 8, 2007	7.66
79	14	"Stage 5"	Alan Taylor	Terence Winter	April 15, 2007	7.42
80	15	"Remember When"	Phil Abraham	Terence Winter	April 22, 2007	6.85
81	16	"Chasing It"	Tim Van Patten	Matthew Weiner	April 29, 2007	6.76
82	17	"Walk Like a Man"	Terence Winter	Terence Winter	May 6, 2007	7.16
83	18	"Kennedy and Heidi"	Alan Taylor	Matthew Weiner and David Chase	May 13, 2007	6.49
84	19	"The Second Coming"	Tim Van Patten	Terence Winter	May 20, 2007	7.34
85	20	"The Blue Comet"	Alan Taylor	David Chase and Matthew Weiner	June 3, 2007	8.02
86	21	"Made in America"	David Chase	David Chase	June 10, 2007	11.90

== Ratings ==
The Sopranos : U.S. viewers per episode (millions)

Season	Episode number													Average
Season	1	2	3	4	5	6	7	8	9	10	11	12	13	Average
1	3.45	N/A	N/A	N/A	N/A	N/A	N/A	N/A	N/A	N/A	N/A	4.19	5.22	3.46
2	7.64	5.33	5.60	7.16	5.34	5.83	6.66	6.29	7.18	7.62	5.51	5.44	8.97	6.62
3	11.26	11.35	8.37	7.96	7.40	8.44	9.21	8.60	8.64	8.44	8.79	N/A	9.46	8.87
4	13.43	11.21	10.97	10.67	9.76	10.46	9.72	10.97	9.83	10.68	11.12	11.07	12.48	10.99
5	12.14	9.97	10.11	9.69	9.75	9.93	9.08	9.99	8.96	8.48	8.81	9.53	10.98	9.80
6A	9.47	9.18	8.93	8.83	8.58	7.94	8.49	8.54	8.49	8.13	8.18	8.91	–	8.64
6B	7.66	7.42	6.85	6.76	7.16	6.49	7.34	8.02	11.90	–				7.73

Audience measurement performed by Nielsen Media Research
