= The Sopranos season 3 =

Television show season

The Sopranos
- Season 3
- Region 1 DVD cover art
- Starring: James Gandolfini; Lorraine Bracco; Edie Falco; Michael Imperioli; Dominic Chianese; Steven Van Zandt; Tony Sirico; Robert Iler; Jamie-Lynn Sigler; Drea de Matteo; Aida Turturro; John Ventimiglia; Federico Castelluccio; Steve Schirripa; Robert Funaro; Kathrine Narducci; Nancy Marchand; Joe Pantoliano
- No. of episodes: 13

Release
- Original network: HBO
- Original release: March 4 – May 20, 2001

Season chronology
- ← Previous; Season 2 Next → Season 4

The third season of the American crime drama series The Sopranos began airing on HBO with a two-hour premiere on March 4, 2001, before concluding on May 20, 2001, and consisted of thirteen episodes. The third season was released on VHS and DVD in region 1 on August 27, 2002.

The story of season three focuses on the relationship between Tony and his children — Meadow, as she begins her first year at Columbia University, and Anthony Jr., who is having behavioral troubles in high school. Tony's relationship with his aging mother, Livia, is brought to a head. Uncle Junior, released from prison, now deals with health issues. Dr. Melfi experiences a horrifying personal trauma, but begins to make real progress in discovering the root causes of Tony's panic attacks. Also featured heavily are Christopher's rise in the mob when he becomes a made man, Jackie Aprile Jr. joining the crime family and Tony's extramarital affair with another one of Dr. Melfi's patients, Gloria.

== Cast ==
- James Gandolfini as Tony Soprano, the De facto boss of the DiMeo crime family, who struggles with his relationship with his children and the son of his late friend.
- Lorraine Bracco as Dr. Jennifer Melfi, Tony's therapist, who undergoes a trauma and is tempted to make use of her connections.
- Edie Falco as Carmela Soprano, Tony's wife, whose struggles with her husband's work as it becomes more severe.
- Michael Imperioli as Christopher Moltisanti, Tony's cousin and a DiMeo soldier who is unhappy with his new responsibilities.
- Dominic Chianese as Corrado "Junior" Soprano, Jr., Tony's uncle and the boss of the family, who is still stuck on house arrest.
- Steven Van Zandt as Silvio Dante, the family's loyal consigliere.
- Tony Sirico as Paul "Paulie Walnuts" Gualtieri, a short-tempered capo who begins having issues with Chris.
- Robert Iler as Anthony Soprano, Jr., Tony's son, whose disciplinary issues become more and more severe.
- Jamie-Lynn Sigler as Meadow Soprano, Tony's daughter, whose choice of boyfriends puts her at odds with her father.
- Nancy Marchand as Livia Soprano, (Note: Marchand died before filming began and only appears in one episode, "Proshai, Livushka", in archive footage through digital effects.) Tony's petulant mother, who may testify against him in court.
- Drea de Matteo as Adriana La Cerva, Chris's fiancée.
- Aida Turturro as Janice Soprano, Tony's dramatic sister who gets into a feud with her mother's caretaker.
- John Ventimiglia as Artie Bucco, Tony's non-mob friend who runs a restaurant.
- Steven R. Schirripa as Bobby Baccalieri, Junior's kind-hearted aide.
- Federico Castelluccio as Furio Giunta, a soldier under Tony.
- Robert Funaro as Eugene Pontecorvo, a DiMeo soldier.
- Kathrine Narducci as Charmaine Bucco, Artie's moral wife.
- Joe Pantoliano as Ralph Cifaretto, a volatile, crude soldier with ambitions that clash with Tony.

== Episodes ==
Season 3 episodes
No. overall	No. in season	Title	Directed by	Written by	Original release date	U.S. viewers (millions)
27	1	"Mr. Ruggerio's Neighborhood"	Allen Coulter	David Chase	March 4, 2001	11.26
Three months after the events of the second season, the Sopranos are being monitored by the FBI. DiMeo soldier Patsy Parisi is depressed on his birthday due to the murder of his twin brother, (Note: As depicted in "Guy Walks into a Psychiatrist's Office...".) having correctly suspected Tony as the man responsible. As the FBI watch Tony's house, they spot a drunken Patsy stumbling into his backyard and pointing a gun at the unsuspecting Tony, but finds himself unable to shoot and instead urinates in the family pool. The agents bug Tony's basement after learning that he tends to have his conversations there, but this fails when the basement floods. They then manage to sneak a bug into a lamp.
28	2	"Proshai, Livushka"	Tim Van Patten	David Chase	March 4, 2001	11.35
Tony meets Meadow's mixed race boyfriend, Noah Tannenbaum, and has a panic attack after arguing with him. He goes to visit Livia, trying to find out what she said after being detained, (Note: As depicted in "Funhouse".) only for her to die from a stroke later that night. Tony admits to Melfi his relief at her being dead, only to immediately berate himself for thinking that way. He has to argue with Janice to get her to go to the funeral, and she forces Svetlana Kirilenko, Livia's caretaker, to move out so she can take the house. At Livia's wake, Janice makes it a big event against Livia's wishes, and it falls apart when Carmela and her father Hugh DeAngelis begin insulting Livia because of the strain she put on their relationship. Later that night, Tony watches The Public Enemy and begins to cry when the main character's mother expresses excitement at him coming home from the hospital.
29	3	"Fortunate Son"	Henry J. Bronchtein	Todd A. Kessler	March 11, 2001	8.37
Chris is initiated as a made man, but finds that he still has to kick up to Paulie. Jackie Aprile Jr., looking to get into the game despite his late father's wishes, tips Chris off to a benefit concert he can rob. When Svetlana continues to refuse Janice her mother's record collection, she steals her prosthetic leg. Tony goes to Svetlana's house to try and broker peace, encountering her cousin Irina Peltsin, (Note: Tony's ex-girlfriend, first seen in "The Sopranos".) and feels a bout of anxiety looking at cuts of meat. He recounts to Melfi that as a child, he saw Johnny Soprano chop off the finger of the owner of Satriale's, and later had his first panic attack after seeing his parents dance when Livia became excited over meat. Melfi realizes that Tony pulled meat out of the fridge after his fight with Noah, and establishes a connection between meat and his anxiety. A.J. is made defensive captain of his school's football team, but has a panic attack when his team praises him.
30	4	"Employee of the Month"	John Patterson	Robin Green & Mitchell Burgess	March 18, 2001	7.96
Richie's successor Ralphie Cifaretto begins dating Rosalie and takes Jackie out to collect from a debtor. Angry that he involved Jackie in his activities, Tony promotes soldier Gigi Cestone to capo instead of Ralphie. Men break into Janice's house, beat her, and force her to get Svetlana's leg. In the hospital, she reflects on her behavior and decides to devote herself to God. While walking to her car, Melfi is raped and her attacker is released after a mistake with the chain of custody. Eating at a fast food shop, she notices the rapist being lauded as the employee of the month there, and has a dream where a Rottweiler saves her from him. She admits to Elliot Kupferberg that she is tempted to give the rapist's information to Tony, and abruptly cries in their next session. When Tony asks if there is anything she wants to say, she pauses before responding, "No."
31	5	"Another Toothpick"	Jack Bender	Terence Winter	March 25, 2001	7.40
Carmela and Tony attend a session with Melfi together, where they are unable to resolve their issues. As they drive home, Tony is ticketed by a cop that he fails to bribe. While visiting home, Meadow takes the bugged reading lamp, unknowingly halting the FBI's investigation. Adriana quits as a hostess at Nuovo Vesuvio, leading Artie to angrily express his attraction to her around Tony, who warns him to lay off. He and his wife Charmaine argue about his friendship with Tony, leading her to plan a divorce. Soldier Vito Spatafore's brother is beaten into a coma by the godson of elderly hitman Robert Baccalieri, who takes Tony's order to take care of it. He kills him, but dies in a car crash while leaving the scene. Junior is unable to bring comfort to his aide and Baccalieri's son Bobby Jr. due to his own recent stomach cancer diagnosis. Tony runs into the cop, having been demoted, and tries to offer him money, but he turns it down.
32	6	"University"	Allen Coulter	Story by : David Chase & Terence Winter & Todd A. Kessler and Robin Green & Mitchell Burgess; Teleplay by : Terence Winter and Salvatore J. Stabile	April 1, 2001	8.44
Tracee, a Bada Bing stripper who is having regular sex with Ralphie, has formed a friendly relationship with Tony and tells him that she is pregnant with Ralphie's child. Ralphie's behavior in the Bada Bing becomes increasingly reprehensible, and he eventually beats Tracee to death when she mocks him in front of his friends. Tony attacks Ralphie despite him being a made man, and admits to Melfi and Carmela in their next session that Tracee (without revealing her identity) dying young saddened him. Meadow's Columbia University roommate finds herself unhappy at college. Noah attempts to cheer her up by inviting her to spend time with him and Meadow, but she soon attaches herself to them and interferes with his studying. After Meadow learns that Noah's father is placing a restraining order on her roommate, Noah breaks up with her, deciding that she is "too negative." As Meadow returns home in a foul mood, the strippers at the Bada Bing wonder what happened to Tracee.
33	7	"Second Opinion"	Tim Van Patten	Lawrence Konner	April 8, 2001	9.21
The tumor in Junior's stomach is only partially removed, necessitating subsequent chemotherapy. Junior begins to suffer from the effects. His surgeon does not return his calls, so Tony and Furio intimidate him into prioritizing Junior. Georgie Santorelli (Note: A Bada Bing worker and frequent subject of Tony's abuse, first seen in "46 Long".) buys a Big Mouth Billy Bass for the Bada Bing. Tony, reminded of Pussy's execution, (Note: As depicted in "Funhouse".) furiously beats him with it. Chris continues to delay his payments to Paulie. He catches Paulie sniffing Adriana's underwear during a search of Chris’s apartment and complains to Tony. Paulie warns him never to go to Tony again, but then shows him the Billy Bass and they both laugh. Tony learns that Angie is supposedly struggling for money but observes a new Cadillac in her driveway. He damages it and warns her to ask only him for money in the future. Melfi passes Carmela along to a colleague, who bluntly tells her to take her children and leave Tony, refusing to accept her "blood money”. She informs Tony that she has agreed a $50,000 donation to Columbia, something he had not wanted to do. She insists that he must do this for her, and he reluctantly agrees.
34	8	"He Is Risen"	Allen Coulter	Robin Green & Mitchell Burgess and Todd A. Kessler	April 15, 2001	8.60
Meadow and Jackie develop an attraction to each other and soon begin to date. When Ralphie refuses Tony's offer of a drink, he uninvites him and the Apriles from Thanksgiving. Ralphie gives him a halfhearted apology for his behavior, which Tony ignores. Cestone suffers a fatal heart attack while on the toilet, and Tony realizes nobody but Ralphie is qualified for capo, reluctantly promoting him. When he gratefully asks Tony to share a drink with him, Tony leaves. He meets one of Melfi's patients, car saleswoman Gloria Trillo, and goes to her place of work to test drive a car with her. She later calls Melfi from Tony's boat, telling her that she needs to reschedule her next appointment.
35	9	"The Telltale Moozadell"	Dan Attias	Michael Imperioli	April 22, 2001	8.64
Tony continues his affair with Gloria, and they both lie to Melfi about their recent bouts of happiness, although she is suspicious. A.J. and his friends vandalize their school, but the school chooses not to punish him because of the value he adds to the football team. Annoyed at the lack of consequences, Tony and Carmela ground him for a month. Chris takes over a club and gives it to Adriana to run, and she renames it "Crazy Horse." Jackie's drug dealer friend is caught dealing and thrown out, only for Jackie to assure him that he has Chris's permission, leading to the dealer being beaten. Chris ignores Jackie when he tries to settle things. Tony catches Jackie in an illegal casino and warns him to be on his best behavior if he wants to date Meadow.
36	10	"...To Save Us All from Satan's Power"	Jack Bender	Robin Green & Mitchell Burgess	April 29, 2001	8.44
As Christmas approaches, Tony has Bobby fill in for Pussy as Santa Claus, which prompts Tony's memories of Pussy in the role. Tony thinks about Christmas of 1995, where Pussy was sensitive about people touching his Santa costume. He suspects Pussy may have been wearing a wire under it, determining that the FBI must have turned him on a trip to Boca Raton earlier that year. Bobby takes the role, but is awkward and unappealing as Santa. When Janice complains about lasting pain in her wrist, Tony tracks down the man who beat her and brutalizes him, leaving Janice disturbed when she sees a report about it on the news. Tony goes to a strip club, where he finds Jackie receiving a lap dance. He beats him, and Jackie later admits to Tony on Christmas that he flunked out of college. Meadow gives Tony a Billy Bass as a gift, which he fakes enjoyment of while his family laughs at it.
37	11	"Pine Barrens"	Steve Buscemi	Story by : Tim Van Patten & Terence Winter; Teleplay by : Terence Winter	May 6, 2001	8.79
With Silvio out with the flu, Tony has Paulie collect from a Russian debtor, and he brings Chris along. Paulie starts a fight with the Russian, and believing he killed him, they take the body out to the New Jersey Pine Barrens, only for the Russian to attack them and flee into the woods. As his tracks vanish, Paulie and Chris realize they are lost. They take shelter in an abandoned truck for the night, and Paulie calls Tony for help, leading to a fight with Gloria where she throws a beef steak at Tony's head before he leaves with Bobby to find them. Lured by Paulie firing his gun in frustration, the two groups meet up but find Paulie's car gone, along with the money he took from the Russian. As they drive back to north New Jersey, Tony warns Paulie that he will need to take care of the Russian if he ever turns back up. Meadow discovers Jackie cheating on her when she is too sick to have sex with him, and she breaks up with him. Tony admits to Melfi that he is seeing Gloria, and does not get the parallels she tries to draw between Gloria and Livia.
38	12	"Amour Fou"	Tim Van Patten	Story by : David Chase; Teleplay by : Frank Renzulli	May 13, 2001	5.81 (Note: Denotes individual program numbers were not available so household viewers are listed instead.)
As Carmela begins to fear the possibility of ovarian cancer, she becomes emotional at seemingly random things. She confesses her situation to a priest, who advises her to ignore Tony's immoral actions and live with the money he earns for her. She later discovers that she has a thyroid problem. After hearing how his father and Tony made names for themselves by robbing an elite card game, Jackie gathers his friends and they rob one themselves, unaware that several made men are inside. Jackie kills the dealer when he mocks him, leading to a gunfight that gets his friends killed. The next day, Ralphie and Tony are unable to come to an agreement on what to do about Jackie, with Tony ready to have him killed and Ralphie wanting to give him a pass. When Gloria bumps into Carmela and discovers who her husband is, she calls the Soprano house. Tony tells her that they are through, but she goads him into nearly killing her by threatening to tell his family about their affair. He sends Patsy to threaten her with murder if she ever tries to contact Tony again.
39	13	"Army of One"	John Patterson	David Chase & Lawrence Konner	May 20, 2001	9.46
A.J. is expelled from school for stealing test answers, and Tony posits sending him to military school, which Carmela is against. Paulie is shorted money he is owed from Ralphie and is not helped by Tony, prompting him to talk to the underboss of the New York-based Lupertazzi family, Johnny Sacrimoni. The FBI has an agent befriend Adriana using a false identity. After another talk with Tony, Ralphie has Vito kill Jackie, and his death is framed as a drug deal gone wrong. His death prompts Carmela to change her mind and let A.J. go, only for him to have a panic attack while Carmela dresses him. Tony decides to not have him go, bitterly espousing his hatred of his "putrid gene" to Melfi. After Jackie's funeral, a distraught Meadow repeats the drug deal story to his sister, who insists he was killed by Italians. At the wake at Nuovo Vesuvio, Junior, having been released from house arrest, sings "Core 'ngrato". Drunk, Meadow heckles him, and leaves when Tony notices. He follows her outside, and she decries the funeral as "bullshit" and runs off.

== Reception ==
=== Reviews ===
The third season of The Sopranos received widespread critical acclaim, garnering a score of 97 out of 100 on Metacritic and a 100% approval rating on Rotten Tomatoes with a critics consensus of, "Deftly using its complex characters to delve into thorny moral quandaries, the third season of The Sopranos continues to deliver consistently compelling, albeit controversial, viewing." Caryn James of The New York Times cited the show as a pop-culture phenomenon and stated, "Even measured against insanely high expectations, the series is as good as it has ever been." The Los Angeles Times lauded the series as the "elitist of the elite", adding: "...The Sopranos resurfaces once more as a superbly written and executed hybrid of popular entertainment and high art, offering up its own Golden Age of TV". Detroit Free Press commended the series creator, David Chase, and singled out the show's writing and acting for praise: "The Sopranos, even as series creator David Chase changes pace this season from power struggles to family matters, is still as good as television gets: wonderfully written, superbly acted, always unpredictable."

=== Awards and nominations ===
Year	Association	Category	Nominee(s)	Result	Ref.
2001	Primetime Emmy Awards	Outstanding Drama Series		Nominated	
2001	Primetime Emmy Awards	Outstanding Lead Actor in a Drama Series	James Gandolfini (episode: "Amour Fou")	Won	
2001	Primetime Emmy Awards	Outstanding Lead Actress in a Drama Series	Edie Falco (Episode: "Second Opinion")	Won	
2001	Primetime Emmy Awards	Outstanding Lead Actress in a Drama Series	Lorraine Bracco (episode: "Employee of the Month")	Nominated	
2001	Primetime Emmy Awards	Outstanding Supporting Actor in a Drama Series	Dominic Chianese (episodes: "Another Toothpick" + "Second Opinion")	Nominated	
2001	Primetime Emmy Awards	Outstanding Supporting Actor in a Drama Series	Michael Imperioli (episodes: "Fortunate Son" + "Pine Barrens")	Nominated	
2001	Primetime Emmy Awards	Outstanding Supporting Actress in a Drama Series	Aida Turturro (episodes: "Proshai, Livushka" + "Employee of the Month"	Nominated	
2001	Primetime Emmy Awards	Outstanding Guest Actress in a Drama Series	Annabella Sciorra (episode: "Amour Fou")	Nominated	
2001	Primetime Emmy Awards	Outstanding Directing for a Drama Series	Steve Buscemi (episode: "Pine Barrens")	Nominated	
2001	Primetime Emmy Awards	Outstanding Directing for a Drama Series	Allen Coulter (episode: "University")	Nominated	
2001	Primetime Emmy Awards	Outstanding Directing for a Drama Series	Timothy Van Patten (episode: "Amour Fou")	Nominated	
2001	Primetime Emmy Awards	Outstanding Writing for a Drama Series	Robin Green, Mitchell Burgess (episode: "Employee of the Month")	Won	
2001	Primetime Emmy Awards	Outstanding Writing for a Drama Series	Lawrence Konner (episode: "Second Opinion")	Nominated	
2001	Primetime Emmy Awards	Outstanding Writing for a Drama Series	Frank Renzulli, David Chase (episode: "Amour Fou")	Nominated	
2001	Primetime Emmy Awards	Outstanding Writing for a Drama Series	Terrence Winter, Timothy Van Patten (episode: "Pine Barrens")	Nominated	
2001	Golden Globe Awards	Best Drama Series		Nominated	
2001	Golden Globe Awards	Best Actor in a Drama Series	James Gandolfini	Nominated	
2001	Golden Globe Awards	Best Actress in a Drama Series	Edie Falco	Nominated	
2001	Golden Globe Awards	Best Actress in a Drama Series	Lorraine Bracco	Nominated	
2001	Screen Actors Guild Awards	Outstanding Ensemble in a Drama Series	Entire Cast	Nominated	
2001	Screen Actors Guild Awards	Outstanding Actor in a Drama Series	James Gandolfini	Nominated	
2001	Screen Actors Guild Awards	Outstanding Actress in a Drama Series	Edie Falco	Nominated	
2001	Screen Actors Guild Awards	Outstanding Actress in a Drama Series	Lorraine Bracco	Nominated	
2001	Directors Guild of America Awards	Outstanding Directing for a Drama Series	Steve Buscemi (episode: "Pine Barrens")	Nominated	
2001	Writers Guild of America Awards	Best Drama Episode	Timothy Van Patten, Terrence Winter (episode: "Pine Barrens")	Won	
2001	Writers Guild of America Awards	Best Drama Episode	David Chase (episode: "Proshai, Livushka")	Nominated	
2001	Writers Guild of America Awards	Best Drama Episode	Mitchell Burgess, Robin Green (episode: "Employee of the Month")	Nominated	
2001	TCA Awards	Program of the Year		Won	
2001	TCA Awards	Outstanding Achievement in Drama		Won	
2001	TCA Awards	Outstanding Individual Achievement in Drama	James Gandolfini	Won	
2001	TCA Awards	Outstanding Individual Achievement in Drama	Edie Falco	Nominated	
2001	Satellite Awards	Best Drama Series		Nominated	
2001	Satellite Awards	Best Actor in a Drama Series	James Gandolfini	Nominated	
2001	Satellite Awards	Best Actress in a Drama Series	Edie Falco	Won	
