= He Is Risen (The Sopranos) =

- The Sopranos episode
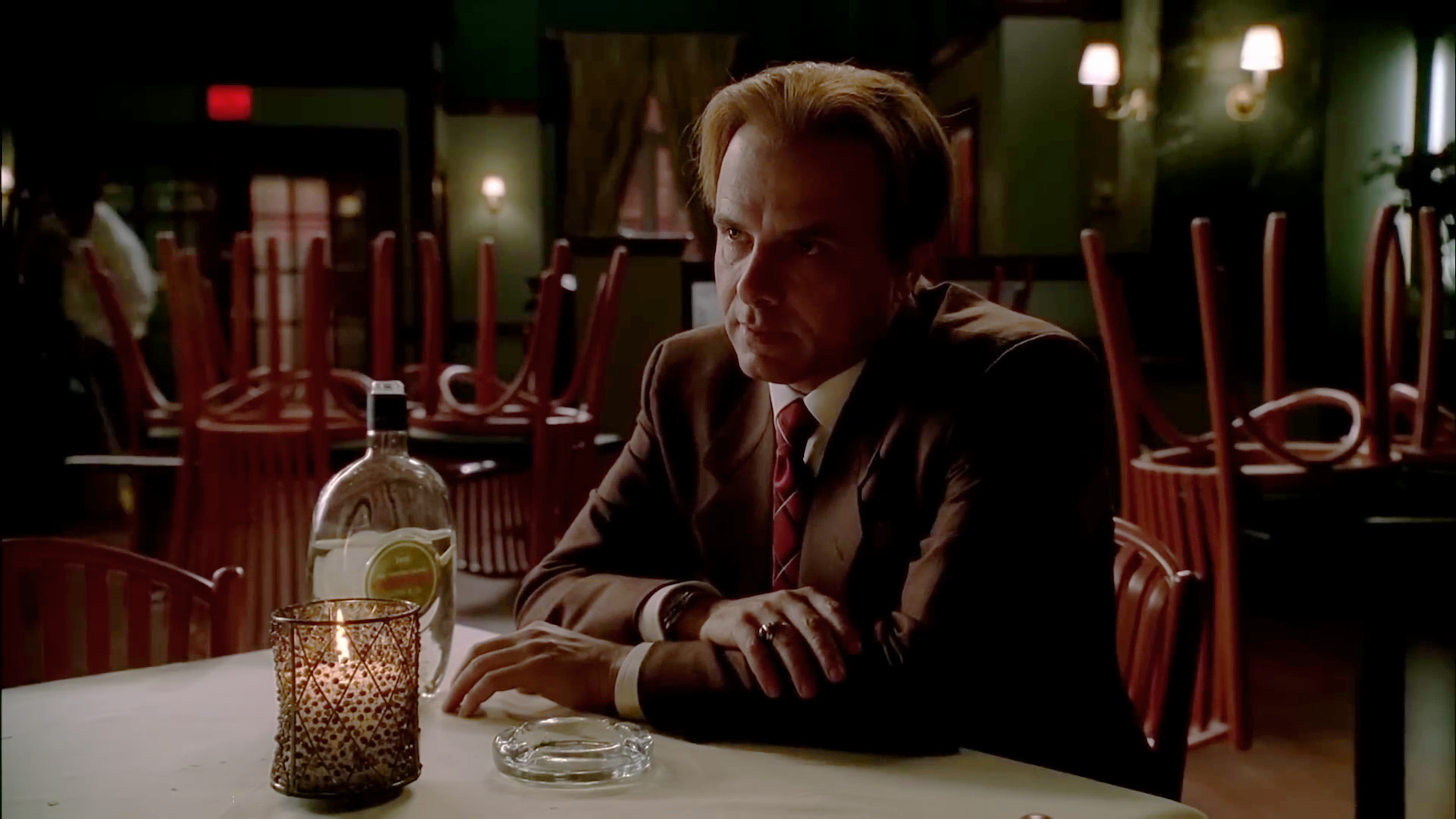
- Ralph Cifaretto receiving a promotion to capo
- Episode no.: Season 3 Episode 8
- Directed by: Allen Coulter
- Written by: Robin Green; Mitchell Burgess; Todd A. Kessler
- Cinematography by: Alik Sakharov
- Production code: 308
- Original air date: April 15, 2001
- Running time: 54 minutes

Episode chronology
| ← Previous "Second Opinion" | Next → "The Telltale Moozadell" |
- The Sopranos season 3

"He Is Risen" is the 34th episode of the HBO original series The Sopranos and the eighth of the show's third season. It was written by Robin Green, Mitchell Burgess and Todd A. Kessler, and directed by Allen Coulter, and originally aired on April 15, 2001.

== Starring ==
- James Gandolfini as Tony Soprano
- Lorraine Bracco as Dr. Jennifer Melfi
- Edie Falco as Carmela Soprano
- Michael Imperioli as Christopher Moltisanti
- Dominic Chianese as Corrado Soprano, Jr.
- Steven Van Zandt as Silvio Dante
- Tony Sirico as Paulie Gualtieri
- Robert Iler as Anthony Soprano, Jr.
- Jamie-Lynn Sigler as Meadow Soprano
- Drea de Matteo as Adriana La Cerva
- Aida Turturro as Janice Soprano
- John Ventimiglia as Artie Bucco
- Robert Funaro as Eugene Pontecorvo
- Joe Pantoliano as Ralph Cifaretto

=== Guest starring ===
- Jerry Adler as Hesh Rabkin

==== Also guest starring ====
- Tom Aldredge as Hugh De Angelis
- Sharon Angela as Rosalie Aprile
- Jason Cerbone as Jackie Aprile, Jr.
- John Fiore as Gigi Cestone
- Joseph R. Gannascoli as Vito Spatafore
- Annabella Sciorra as Gloria Trillo
- Suzanne Shepherd as Mary De Angelis
- Turk Pipkin as Aaron Arkaway
- Vincent Curatola as Johnny Sack
- Denise Borino as Ginny Sacrimoni
- Peter Bogdanovich as Dr. Elliot Kupferberg
- Gregory Alan Williams as Herman James Jr.
- William DaRuffa as Joe
- Raymond Franza as Donny K.

== Synopsis ==
Carmela and Rosalie notice the budding relationship between Meadow and Jackie Jr.; Rosalie is thrilled. At a frat-house mixer, Jackie Jr. gives Meadow ecstasy. Later, they are together on her bed; drunk and high, she falls asleep; he slightly lifts her clothes but goes no further. On a date, they make out in his car. Meadow warns Jackie that their relationship is unlikely to go anywhere at the moment. On another evening, an over-excited Meadow takes Jackie's car and wrecks it. She is unharmed, but he is deeply concerned, and she asks to spend the night with him instead of being driven home.

In Dr. Melfi's waiting room, Tony finds another patient, Gloria Trillo, speaking on the phone. He hears that she works as a saleswoman at a Mercedes-Benz dealership. They have been double-booked, and he gives her the appointment. Later, he visits the dealership, and she accompanies him on a test drive. They end up in bed on Tony's boat. Gloria calls Melfi to cancel a session, and Melfi hears Tony's voice in the background.

Ralphie is intentionally disrespectful to Tony when they meet. Each is thinking of killing the other. Johnny Sack passes messages between them, amending the messages to bring about a reconciliation. At Nuovo Vesuvio, Ralphie apologizes to Tony for his past behavior, including killing Tracee, and blames his actions on his cocaine use. Tony barely acknowledges him. Johnny tells Ralphie that Tony was only "posturing." He has suggested to Tony that he could promote Ralphie to captain in place of Gigi, but Tony is reluctant. Gigi soon dies of a heart attack on the toilet; Ralphie is the best choice to succeed him. He is relieved and joyous when Tony tells him of the promotion. Then he asks whether he's being promoted on merit or just to replace Gigi; Tony does not answer and walks away when Ralphie suggests they have a drink together.

== First appearances ==
- Gloria Trillo: a therapy patient of Dr. Melfi's and a car saleswoman at Globe Motors.
- Little Paulie Germani: Paulie Gualtieri's nephew and crew member.
- Aaron Arkaway: Janice's Christian boyfriend who has narcolepsy.

== Deceased ==
- Gigi Cestone: dies of a heart attack while on the toilet at the Aprile crew hangout.

== Title reference ==
- It is a reference to Aaron, Janice's narcoleptic, evangelical boyfriend, who asks Jackie Jr. if he has heard "the good news, He is risen".
- This episode originally aired on Easter Sunday.
- The title is also a reference to Ralph being finally promoted to Capo of the Aprile crew.

== Cultural references ==
- When Tony tells Carmela to disinvite Ralphie and Ro for Thanksgiving dinner, he references The Jetsons, stating Ralph's not going to Mr. Spacely's house for dinner.
- Tony, Hugh, A.J., and Chris watch the annual Detroit Lions Thanksgiving game, during which Janice claims that she served Barry Sanders when she was a waitress at Kenny Rogers.
- Silvio warns Tony that Ralph is the type to pull a "Jack Ruby" on you, referring to the sneak-attacking shooter of Lee Harvey Oswald.
- When Jackie Junior comes into Ro's kitchen, Ralph greets him, "Oh, Fabian!"
- The deaths of Elvis Presley and Don Simpson. At the funeral of Gigi Cestone (who dies of heart failure while on the toilet), all are in agreement that Gigi's death, while natural, was arguably one of the most embarrassing ways to go. Anthony Soprano states that it's "how Elvis went." Silvio Dante mistakenly replies, "That guy in Hollywood, too. 'Don' something. Producer of The Simpsons."
- Tony references Sun Tzu's The Art of War on a couple of occasions.
- Tony references "Prince Matchabelli" when he intends to reference Machiavelli's The Prince.
- Speaking to Tony about Gigi's crew, Uncle Junior says, "For them he's a Ghibelline, coming to butt in." The Ghibellines were a political and military faction in 13th- and 14th-century Italy.

== Music ==
- The song at the party where Jackie is selling ecstasy and meets Meadow is "Touch Me" by Taskforce (Thrillseekers Remix).
- When Ralphie turns his back on Tony at the casino, the song playing on the jukebox is "Ghost Riders in the Sky" by The Ramrods.
- Prior to this, "Rag Doll" from The Four Seasons is played. The lead singer of The Four Seasons, Frankie Valli appeared later in season 5.
- The music playing at Gigi's funeral is Adagio in G minor by Remo Giazotto (also played at Livia's funeral in "Proshai, Livushka").
- The song "Whoa!" by Black Rob is played in the episode.
- The song played over the end credits is "The Captain" by Kasey Chambers.
