= Employee of the Month (The Sopranos) =

- The Sopranos episode
- Episode no.: Season 3 Episode 4
- Directed by: John Patterson
- Written by: Robin Green; Mitchell Burgess
- Cinematography by: Alik Sakharov
- Production code: 304
- Original air date: March 18, 2001
- Running time: 53 minutes

Episode chronology
← Previous "Fortunate Son"	Next → "Another Toothpick"
- The Sopranos season 3

"Employee of the Month" is the 30th episode of the HBO original series The Sopranos and the fourth episode of the show's third season. It was written by Robin Green and Mitchell Burgess, directed by John Patterson, and originally aired on March 18, 2001.

== Starring ==
- James Gandolfini as Tony Soprano
- Lorraine Bracco as Dr. Jennifer Melfi
- Edie Falco as Carmela Soprano
- Michael Imperioli as Christopher Moltisanti
- Dominic Chianese as Corrado Soprano Jr. *
- Steven Van Zandt as Silvio Dante
- Tony Sirico as Paulie Gualtieri
- Robert Iler as Anthony Soprano Jr. (voice only)
- Jamie-Lynn Sigler as Meadow Soprano
- Drea de Matteo as Adriana La Cerva
- Aida Turturro as Janice Soprano
- Federico Castelluccio as Furio Giunta
- Joe Pantoliano as Ralph Cifaretto

* = credit only

=== Guest starring ===
- Sharon Angela as Rosalie Aprile
- Peter Bogdanovich as Dr. Elliot Kupferberg
- Denise Borino as Ginny Sacrimoni
- Jason Cerbone as Jackie Aprile Jr.
- Vince Curatola as Johnny Sack
- John Fiore as Gigi Cestone
- Oksana Lada as Irina Peltsin
- Will McCormack as Jason LaPenna
- Mario Polit as Jesus Rossi
- Peter Riegert as Ronald Zellman
- Richard Romanus as Richard LaPenna
- Shaun Toub as Arouk Abboubi

== Synopsis ==
Johnny Sack and his wife Ginny have moved to a large house in New Jersey. Tony goes there and asks Johnny insistently why he didn't tell him about it. Johnny says they moved there for family reasons and that he is not going to interfere in Tony's business.

Two Russian thugs break into Janice's home and demand the return of Svetlana's prosthetic leg. When Janice refuses, one of them hits her hard. The leg is in a bowling alley locker; Janice takes them there and gives it to them. Tony visits her in the hospital, exasperated with her again; he will have to retaliate against the men who assaulted his sister. Janice is unperturbed, instead saying she has hit bottom but feels born again in the Lord: "I give myself up utterly and totally to God."

Ralphie is now dating Rosalie, and takes Jackie, Jr. with him to collect extortion money. Ralphie has no dispute with the man there but provokes a fight. The man takes out a baseball bat, but Ralphie and Jackie take it from him. Ralphie holds the man and urges Jackie to hit him. Jackie eagerly beats and kicks him. Ralphie empties the man's wallet and gives some of the money to Jackie, who is gloating. Partly because of this incident, Tony makes Gigi a captain instead of Ralphie, to his deep disappointment.

Dr. Melfi suggests that perhaps Tony plan a visit along with Carmela. She and her ex-husband Richard are now reconciled. She inadvertently reveals her patient's name to Dr. Elliot Kupferberg and admits that Richard may have learned his name through her appointment book. Both Richard and Kupferberg are urging her to cease treating her gangster patient. She, too, begins to have doubts: "I've been charmed by a sociopath," she says. In a subsequent session, she tells Tony he should be treated by a behavior modification therapist, but he is reluctant to talk to anyone else.

In the parking garage one evening after work, Dr. Melfi is attacked and raped. The police quickly find the man. Richard and her son Jason are understandably enraged. It doesn't help matters when they are informed that, because of a loss in the chain of custody, the police had to release the rapist. Jennifer and Richard fight, blaming each other for the rape. Melfi later sees a picture of the man, who has been named employee of the month at a local sub shop, and flees. She feels a crazed desire for revenge and knows she could obtain it with a word to Tony Soprano.

Melfi has a dream. She buys a soda from a vending machine with a piece of macaroni; when she reaches into the machine to get it, her hand is trapped inside. A Rottweiler appears and terrifies her. Then the rapist advances toward her. The dog turns and mauls the rapist, who cries in agony. Reflecting with Kupferberg, she understands the meaning: the dog is Tony Soprano taking revenge on her behalf.

She tells Tony and others she has been in a car accident. Tony suggests to Carmela that perhaps she join him for his next session with her, but Carmela shrugs. Later, when he sees Melfi, Tony is shocked and concerned by her injuries. He tells her he is now ready to see a behaviorist, but she says, "No," and starts crying. Tony goes to her, lays his hands gently on her, and asks what the matter is. She composes herself and asks him to return to his seat. He goes back, but asks, "What? You wanna say something?" After a tense pause, seemingly contemplating asking Tony to revenge her rape, she firmly says, "No."

== First appearances ==
- Ginny Sacrimoni: The wife of Johnny Sack.

== Title reference ==
- Dr. Melfi happens to see her rapist's picture on the wall of a Submarine sandwich shop she visits as "Employee of the Month".

== Awards ==
- The episode's writers, Robin Green and Mitchell Burgess, won an Emmy Award in 2001 for Best Writing in a Drama Series.
- Lorraine Bracco was nominated for an Emmy Award for Outstanding Lead Actress in a Drama Series for season three. She lost the award to co-star Edie Falco, who submitted the episode "Second Opinion".

== Music ==
- The song played over the end credits is "Fisherman's Daughter" by Daniel Lanois.
- The song that plays while Ralphie and Jackie Aprile, Jr are eating at Vesuvio's is "Speedoo" by The Cadillacs.
- In the scene where Janice Soprano is practicing guitar, she is attempting "(I Can't Get No) Satisfaction" by The Rolling Stones.
- In the scene where Dr. Melfi was at the sub shop (before fleeing), Britney Spears' song "Oops!... I Did It Again" is heard.
- The song played in The Bada Bing Club is "Love Rollercoaster" by The Ohio Players.
- The song played during the Sacrimonis’ house warming party is "Americano" by the Brian Setzer Orchestra.

== Reference to other media ==
- Lorraine Bracco's character is raped by Jesus Rossi or J. Rossi. In the film Goodfellas, Lorraine Bracco's character also has a nemesis named J. Rossi (Janice Rossi), with whom her husband is having an affair.

== Filming locations ==
Listed in order of first appearance:

- Long Island City, Queens
- North Caldwell, New Jersey
- Lodi, New Jersey
- Satin Dolls in Lodi, New Jersey
- Fort Lee, New Jersey
- Verona, New Jersey
