= University (The Sopranos) =

- The Sopranos episode
- Episode no.: Season 3 Episode 6
- Directed by: Allen Coulter
- Story by: David Chase; Terence Winter; Todd A. Kessler; Robin Green; Mitchell Burgess
- Teleplay by: Terence Winter; Salvatore Stabile
- Cinematography by: Alik Sakharov
- Production code: 306
- Original air date: April 1, 2001
- Running time: 49 minutes

Episode chronology
← Previous "Another Toothpick"	Next → "Second Opinion"
- The Sopranos season 3

"University" is the 32nd episode of the HBO original series The Sopranos and the sixth of the show's third season. The teleplay was written by Terence Winter and Salvatore J. Stabile from a story idea by David Chase, Terence Winter, Todd A. Kessler, Robin Green, and Mitchell Burgess. It was directed by Allen Coulter and originally aired on April 1, 2001.

== Starring ==
- James Gandolfini as Tony Soprano
- Lorraine Bracco as Dr. Jennifer Melfi
- Edie Falco as Carmela Soprano
- Michael Imperioli as Christopher Moltisanti
- Dominic Chianese as Corrado Soprano, Jr. *
- Steven Van Zandt as Silvio Dante
- Tony Sirico as Paulie Gualtieri
- Robert Iler as Anthony Soprano, Jr.
- Jamie-Lynn Sigler as Meadow Soprano
- Drea de Matteo as Adriana La Cerva *
- Aida Turturro as Janice Soprano *
- Federico Castelluccio as Furio Giunta
- Steven R. Schirripa as Bobby Baccalieri
- Joe Pantoliano as Ralph Cifaretto

* = credit only

=== Guest starring ===
- Ariel Kiley as Tracee
- Suzanne Shepherd as Mary De Angelis
- Tom Aldredge as Hugh De Angelis
- Ari Graynor as Caitlin Rucker
- Patrick Tully as Noah Tannenbaum
- Sharon Angela as Rosalie Aprile
- Jason Cerbone as Jackie Aprile, Jr.
- Maureen Van Zandt as Gabriella Dante
- John Fiore as Gigi Cestone
- Dan Grimaldi as Patsy Parisi
- Frank Santorelli as Georgie Santorelli
- Joseph R. Gannascoli as Vito Spatafore
- Michael Garfield as Len Tannenbaum

== Synopsis ==
Meadow and Noah are embracing on her bed in her room at Columbia when her unhappy roommate Caitlin comes back in. Meadow and Noah go to his room instead and they have sex; it is her first time. They then try to help Caitlin; Meadow admires Noah's sensitivity. They take her out on her birthday, but an encounter with a homeless woman upsets her again. When Meadow is away, Caitlin persuades Noah to let her hang out in his room. She distracts him while he is working, and he is furious and ashamed at the grade he gets: "C-fucking-minus and it's all her fault!" Meadow nervously meets Noah's father; in reply to his question, she says her father is in waste management. She is taken aback when Noah says his father has taken out a restraining order against Caitlin. Then, when they are together studying in the library, Noah looks up and quietly tells Meadow he is breaking up with her, accusing her of being "too negative."

At the Bada Bing, Tony is approached by one of the pole dancers, Tracee. She reminds him that he gave her advice about her sick son and to thank him gives him some date nut bread she has made. Tony explains that this is out of place; also, she is Ralphie's girl. Tracee later approaches him again, telling him she is pregnant by Ralphie and asking for advice; Tony says that for the sake of the baby itself and future generations, she should have an abortion. Ralphie's manic jokes offend the other mobsters. He is obsessed with the film Gladiator and roughhouses with Georgie. Things become tense when he finds a length of chain and swings it at Georgie, injuring his eye.

Tracee misses work for three days, claiming to be sick, and stays at home with Ralphie. Silvio goes there, drags her out, and throws her into his car while Ralphie watches through a window, laughing. She later sees Ralphie at the club; he has not been in touch for three days, and she insults him in front of the other mobsters. Outside in the parking lot, they have an argument that turns violent. After Tracee insults Ralphie's manhood, he knocks her to the ground, brutally beats her and bashes her head twice against a metal guardrail, killing her. Tony is furious and, although Ralphie is a made man, physically assaults him.

He speaks obliquely about the event to Dr. Melfi. "Sad when they go so young," he says.

== Deceased ==
- Tracee: 20-year-old Bada Bing stripper beaten to death by Ralphie in the parking lot.

== Title reference ==
- Much of the episode revolves around Meadow's university experiences.
- Tracee suffers through the proverbial 'school of hard knocks'.
- The title may also call back to the Season 1 episode “College”, which featured similar themes.

== Other cultural references ==
- In the first scene, Silvio points to "Yo Yo Ma" as evidence that the Chinese, like his fellow Italians, also have "nicknames."
- After being introduced to Meadow, Noah's father says he sat next to a talkative Tim Daly of Wings fame on his flight from Los Angeles. Noah also mentions that his father did Daly's deal for the short-lived TV series remake of The Fugitive. Daly would later play the role of television writer J.T. Dolan on The Sopranos, beginning with the episode "In Camelot".
- Caitlin talks about seeing the 1932 film Freaks at the student center.
- Caitlin references the Lindbergh kidnapping while expressing to Meadow how she was worried about her missing.
- During a scene in the family kitchen, A.J. wears a Nine Inch Nails Fragility tour T-shirt.
- After dining out with Noah's father, Noah and Meadow see the Francis Ford Coppola film Dementia 13.
- Ralph makes several references to the film Gladiator, including Russell Crowe's performance.
- Ralph watches and disparages Stanley Kubrick's Spartacus, starring Kirk Douglas, which Christopher recommended as a good gladiator film.

== Music ==
- The song played during Tracee's introduction and during the end credits is "Living on a Thin Line", from The Kinks' 1984 album, Word of Mouth.
- The song playing in the background during the first scene between Noah and Meadow is "The Dolphin's Cry" by Live.
- When the stripper (Kelly Kole) is trying to get into the VIP room of the Bada Bing, "You Shook Me All Night Long" by AC/DC is playing in the background.
- The song playing when Tracee shows Tony her new braces is Minnie Riperton's "Inside My Love" (1975).
- The song playing when Silvio is informed that Tracee had missed three days of work is "Takin' Care of Business" by Bachman–Turner Overdrive.
- The song playing in the background when Meadow and Noah have dinner with Noah's father is "Everybody's Jumpin" by The Dave Brubeck Quartet.
- "Powder Your Face with Sunshine" by Dean Martin is used in a scene at the Bada Bing, where Ralph is telling the Custer joke.

== Aftermath ==
According to actress Ariel Kiley, who portrays Tracee, a lot of subscribers canceled their HBO service because of the episode.

== Filming locations ==
Listed in order of first appearance:

- Satin Dolls in Lodi, New Jersey
- North Caldwell, New Jersey
- Bronx Community College
- Union Square, Manhattan
- Bronx Community College Library
- Little Falls, New Jersey
