= Fortunate Son (The Sopranos) =

- The Sopranos episode
- Episode no.: Season 3 Episode 3
- Directed by: Henry J. Bronchtein
- Written by: Todd A. Kessler
- Cinematography by: Alik Sakharov
- Production code: 303
- Original air date: March 11, 2001
- Running time: 58 minutes

Episode chronology
| ← Previous "Proshai, Livushka" | Next → "Employee of the Month" |
- The Sopranos season 3

"Fortunate Son" is the 29th episode of the HBO original series The Sopranos and the third of the show's third season. It was written by Todd A. Kessler and directed by Henry J. Bronchtein, and originally aired on March 11, 2001.

== Starring ==
- James Gandolfini as Tony Soprano
- Lorraine Bracco as Dr. Jennifer Melfi
- Edie Falco as Carmela Soprano
- Michael Imperioli as Christopher Moltisanti
- Dominic Chianese as Corrado Soprano, Jr.
- Steven Van Zandt as Silvio Dante
- Tony Sirico as Paulie Gualtieri
- Robert Iler as Anthony Soprano, Jr.
- Jamie-Lynn Sigler as Meadow Soprano
- Drea de Matteo as Adriana La Cerva
- Aida Turturro as Janice Soprano
- John Ventimiglia as Artie Bucco
- Steven R. Schirripa as Bobby Baccalieri
- Federico Castelluccio as Furio Giunta
- Robert Funaro as Eugene Pontecorvo
- Joe Pantoliano as Ralph Cifaretto

=== Guest starring ===
- Joseph Siravo as Johnny Boy Soprano
- Rocco Sisto as young Junior Soprano
- Andrew Davoli as Dino Zerilli
- Tom Aldredge as Hugh DeAngelis
- Suzanne Shepherd as Mary DeAngelis
- Alla Kliouka as Svetlana Kirilenko
- Vincent Curatola as Johnny Sack
- John Fiore as Gigi Cestone
- Dan Grimaldi as Patsy Parisi
- George Loros as Raymond Curto
- Max Casella as Benny Fazio
- Jason Cerbone as Jackie Aprile, Jr.
- Tony Lip as Carmine Lupertazzi
- Richard Maldone as Albert Barese
- Sharon Angela as Rosalie Aprile
- Oksana Babiy as Irina Peltsin
- Laila Robins as Young Livia Soprano
- Patrick Tully as Noah Tannenbaum
- Peter Byrne as Security Guard
- Megan Curry as Punked-Out Coed
- Steve Grillo as Pizza Customer
- Kevin Janicelli as Roy DelGuercio
- Mario Lavandeira as Male Student
- Steve Mellor as Bill Owens
- David Mogentale as Coach Goodwin
- Peter Napoliello as Football Dad
- Sal Petraccione as George Piocosta
- Frank Savino as Operator #1
- Paul Reggio as Operator #2
- Jessica Ripton as Pizza Customer #2
- Johnny Spanish as Junkie
- Brian Anthony Wilson as Warren Dupree
- Lou Bonacki as Francis Satriale
- Mark Damiano II as Young Tony Soprano
- Juliet Fox as Young Janice Soprano
- Elxis McLaren as Young Barbara Soprano

== Synopsis ==
Christopher Moltisanti is initiated as a made man alongside Eugene Pontecorvo in a ceremony conducted by Tony Soprano. During the ceremony, he sees (or imagines he sees) a raven perched outside the window and fears it is a bad omen. At the party afterward, Paulie gives Chris his sportsbook operation, although Chris will have to give him a portion of his weekly profits. Later, Chris tells Adriana that she needs to stop hostessing at Vesuvio, as the wife of a made man cannot be seen working in a restaurant.

Chris makes some bad judgments in his first week and comes up short. Paulie is unforgiving and demands payment by the end of the week, imposing an extra payment for the delay.

Jackie Aprile, Jr. has been taking pre-med courses at Rutgers University but is skipping classes and planning criminal activities. Tony asks him to meet, but Jackie shows up late and is disrespectful. Jackie's uncle Richie Aprile has disappeared. Jackie believes that Tony had Richie killed, and Tony knows this. Tony denies having anything to do with Richie's disappearance, saying that Richie was an informant who is now in the witness protection program. Tony was close to Jackie's father, who did not want his son to follow a life of crime. Jackie says he was struggling in school and could never become a doctor. Later, Tony tells Chris not to involve Jackie in any criminal activities.

Jackie has a plan to rob a charity concert at Rutgers. Chris needs money to pay off Paulie and agrees to help Jackie with the robbery. Chris takes over the operation and makes Jackie the getaway driver. While Jackie is waiting nervously in the car, he hears a gunshot and wets himself. Later Chris gives Paulie the money he owes. Paulie passes his own cut up to Tony, mentioning Jackie's involvement in the robbery. An angered Tony phones Chris, who ignores the call.

Meadow is getting closer to Noah and continues to give Tony the silent treatment. A.J. joins the school football team, making his father very proud, especially when he recovers a fumble at a game. When A.J. is made defensive captain and praised effusively, he passes out on the field.

Svetlana claims she has the right to keep Livia's record collection; in response Janice steals her artificial leg. Svetlana tells Tony, who goes to the house to meet her. Irina is also there but he keeps his distance. He goes to the refrigerator and takes out some packets of sliced meat — then suddenly remembers: when he was around eleven, he saw his father chop off Mr. Satriale the butcher's pinkie for not paying a gambling debt. At dinner that night, his mother was excited by the fresh juicy joint of meat. The parents danced sensually together in front of the children; that was when Tony had his first panic attack. When he tells Dr. Melfi this, she sees a connection between meat, his parents' sexuality, and his panic attacks, saying "We've made real progress today."

== Title reference ==
- The title refers to the song "Fortunate Son" by Creedence Clearwater Revival.
- Four young men or boys in the episode are "fortunate sons": the newly "made" Christopher; Jackie, Jr., who believes he is his father's heir; A.J., who suffers from the same panic attacks as his father; and young Tony, shown in flashback.

== First appearances ==
- Carmine Lupertazzi: Boss of the Lupertazzi crime family, one of the five New York Mafia crime families.
- Benny Fazio: Associate of Christopher and member of the Soprano crew.
- Dino Zerilli: Friend of Jackie Aprile Jr. and partner in crime.

== References to other media ==
- When Adriana learns that Christopher is about to be made, she becomes worried that it might be a pretext for a hit, but Christopher chides her for "watching too many movies." Soon after, after arriving at the basement location of the ceremony, Silvio tells Tony that Chris was nervous during the entire ride over, and this time, Tony kids Chris as the one who's "watching too many movies." Joe Pesci's character in Goodfellas was killed on the pretense of being made.
- When Tony talks with Janice in his living room, they do so while an E! Channel program looks back at the career of Jayne Mansfield, circa 1954.
- During the flashback scene in which Tony, as a boy, is speaking to his father about how he handled watching the torture of Mr. Satriale, the signature theme from The Good, the Bad and the Ugly plays on the television set; in the same sequence, the newspaper Tony's father is holding has the headline "Warriors Land Lucas", referring to a trade which occurred on October 25, 1969 (this matches the calendar – opened to October 1969 – hanging in Satriale's butcher shop).
- When he robs the benefit concert, Christopher wears a Ghostface mask from the movie Scream.
- Dr. Melfi and Tony discuss the famous opening scene of Remembrance of Things Past by Marcel Proust. "This sounds very gay," Tony comments.

== Music ==
- The music that is playing in the background in the first pizza parlor scene is "Rock and Roll" by Led Zeppelin. "Rock and Roll"'s appearance on this Sopranos episode was the first instance in Led Zeppelin's history that one of the band's songs was licensed for a television series.
- The music that is playing in the background in the second pizza parlor scene is "Ain't Talkin' 'bout Love" by Van Halen.
- The music being played in the bar while the game is on is "All Good?" by De La Soul.
- The song played at Christopher's party at the Bada Bing is "I See You Baby" by Groove Armada.
- The song being played as background music in the restaurant when Tony meets Jackie Aprile, Jr. is "The Happy Organ" by Dave "Baby" Cortez.
- The next song is "Sally Go 'Round the Roses" by The Jaynetts.
- The band song played as Tony has a flashback to his childhood is the Notre Dame Victory March.
- The song being played as background music in the scene when young Tony talks with his father is the Hugo Montenegro arrangement of Ennio Morricone's main title theme from The Good, the Bad and the Ugly.
- The song Johnny sings to Livia while they dance is "Take All of Me" by Billie Holiday
- The song played over the end credits is "Where's the Money" by Dan Hicks.

== Filming locations ==
Listed in order of first appearance:

- Kearny, New Jersey
- Long Island City, Queens
- North Caldwell, New Jersey
- Paterson, New Jersey
- Albertus Magnus High School in Bardonia, New York
- Verona, New Jersey
- Satriale's Pork Store in Kearny, New Jersey
- Bronx Community College
- Bergen Community College in Paramus, New Jersey
- Totowa, New Jersey
