= Another Toothpick =

- The Sopranos episode
- Episode no.: Season 3 Episode 5
- Directed by: Jack Bender
- Written by: Terence Winter
- Cinematography by: Alik Sakharov
- Production code: 305
- Original air date: March 25, 2001
- Running time: 60 minutes

Episode chronology
← Previous "Employee of the Month"	Next → "University"
- The Sopranos season 3

"Another Toothpick" is the 31st episode of the HBO original series The Sopranos and the fifth of the show's third season. It was written by Terence Winter and directed by Jack Bender, and originally aired on March 25, 2001.

== Starring ==
- James Gandolfini as Tony Soprano
- Lorraine Bracco as Dr. Jennifer Melfi
- Edie Falco as Carmela Soprano
- Michael Imperioli as Christopher Moltisanti
- Dominic Chianese as Corrado Soprano, Jr.
- Steven Van Zandt as Silvio Dante *
- Tony Sirico as Paulie Gualtieri
- Robert Iler as A.J. Soprano
- Jamie-Lynn Sigler as Meadow Soprano
- Drea de Matteo as Adriana La Cerva
- Aida Turturro as Janice Soprano
- John Ventimiglia as Artie Bucco
- Steven R. Schirripa as Bobby Baccalieri
- Robert Funaro as Eugene Pontecorvo
- Kathrine Narducci as Charmaine Bucco
- Joe Pantoliano as Ralph Cifaretto

* = credit only

=== Guest starring ===
- Tom Aldredge as Hugh De Angelis
- Jason Cerbone as Jackie Aprile, Jr.
- Vince Curatola as Johnny Sack
- Charles S. Dutton as Officer Leon Wilmore
- John Fiore as Gigi Cestone
- Joseph R. Gannascoli as Vito Spatafore
- Frank Pellegrino as Bureau Chief Frank Cubitoso
- Peter Riegert as Ronald Zellman
- Paul Schulze as Father Phil Intintola
- Matt Servitto as Agent Harris
- Suzanne Shepherd as Mary De Angelis
- Brian Tarantina as Mustang Sally
- Vanessa Ferlito as Tina Francesco
- Burt Young as Bobby Baccalieri, Sr.
- Erik Weiner as Manager
- Michael Matera as Carlos

== Synopsis ==
Tony and Carmela have a joint session with Dr. Melfi. It ends in recriminations: Carmela feels the other two have joined against her. Driving home she is tearful; Tony drives recklessly and is pulled over for speeding by Officer Leon Wilmore, who is black. Tony's charm, his PBA card, and implicit bribery do not work, and Wilmore writes up a ticket. Tony contacts New Jersey Assemblyman Ronald Zellman to get it canceled.

Days later, visiting a lawn ornament store, Tony sees Wilmore working there. He tells Tony, who is smiling sarcastically, that he has been transferred to the property room and can no longer work overtime. This is more drastic than Tony wanted and he asks Zellman to have him reinstated. Tony then has another argument with Meadow about his racist attitudes, and next time he speaks to Zellman he says Wilmore can stay where he is. But he returns to the garden store, makes a purchase, and offers him some additional $100 bills. Wilmore does not deign to take the money.

Meadow takes the lamp from the basement at home to her dorm at Columbia University, and so unknowingly "neutralizes" the FBI's listening operation.

Junior is diagnosed with stomach cancer.

The last customers have left Nuovo Vesuvio, and Artie is glad to be alone with Adriana to celebrate a profitable evening. She surprises him by telling him that Christopher no longer wants her to work as a hostess. Hiding his chagrin, Artie allows her to leave without notice. When Tony and Chris are dining there, a drunken Artie needles Chris, who angrily makes a grab at him. Tony sends Chris out then angrily grabs Artie himself. Artie says he is in love with Adriana, and Tony's anger changes to amusement. He reminds him that Chris is a made man and never to utter those words again.

Tony wants to go into business with Artie selling Italian food products. Charmaine nixes the idea, believing Tony only wants another business as a front. During the ensuing argument, she tells Artie that their marriage is over. Artie then has an awkward dinner with Adriana; she withdraws her hand when he tries to take it.

Bryan Spatafore, Vito's brother, is innocently embroiled in a row between Mustang Sally and his girlfriend. Sally viciously assaults Bryan with a golf club, putting him into a coma. Sally goes into hiding but is in touch with his godfather, Bobby Baccalieri's father, Bobby, Sr.; the relationship is "in name only", Bobby, Sr. says, and Tony gives him the task. But he is dying of lung cancer and can hardly stop coughing. Bobby desperately wants to stop his father from doing it; so does Junior, who goes to see Tony, but Tony refuses to change the plan. Bobby, Sr. himself wants to do it: "It will feel good being useful for a change."

The hit almost goes awry and ends with a struggle, but Bobby Sr. succeeds in killing Sally and his friend. After the killings, his face smeared with Sally's blood, he finds some cigarettes and starts smoking. Still smoking while driving away, he has a coughing fit, cannot reach his inhaler, and slumps onto the steering wheel. The car crashes and he dies.

== Deceased ==
- Febby Viola: died of cancer; Carmela's uncle
- Mustang Sally: shot and killed by Robert Baccalieri Sr. on orders by Tony Soprano and Gigi Cestone
- Carlos: Mustang Sally's friend; shot for being a witness to his murder
- Bobby Baccalieri, Sr.: Crashed his car while suffering a coughing fit brought on by his lung cancer

== Title reference ==
- Janice claims that Livia often described a person who was dying of cancer as "another toothpick".

== Cultural references ==
- When Tony is pulled over by the traffic officer, he pulls out his wallet and shows his New Jersey Association card, the name on his card is Michael J. Madonna, the president of the New Jersey State PBA at the time. Madonna, who was later appointed to the Waterfront Commission of New York Harbor, would ironically be accused of facilitating corrupt dealings in his role, resulting in his firing by governor Jon Corzine in 2009.
- As Bobby Sr. visits Mustang Sally and Carlos, before their deaths, the two were watching Sally Jessy Raphael's talk show on TV.
- In the scene where Junior tells Bobby he has cancer, the movie playing on the television is The Devil at 4 O'Clock with Frank Sinatra.
- The lawn ornament store that Wilmore works at is "Fountains of Wayne", which was a real store in Wayne, New Jersey that closed in 2009; the store was the namesake of the band of the same name.
- Ralphie repeatedly discusses Gladiator, starring Russell Crowe.

== Production ==
Going into the third season, this episode marks the first time the show's leading ladies, Lorraine Bracco and Edie Falco as Dr. Melfi and Carmela Soprano respectively, spoke to each other face-to-face. Their two previous conversations had taken place over the phone, while they had only caught a glimpse of each other in season 1, when Carmela drove Tony to meet Melfi for a session in her car.

== Music ==
- The song played over the end credits is "Shuck Dub" by R. L. Burnside.
- Meadow Soprano sings along to The Corrs' "Breathless" while listening to headphones.
- The song playing on the radio in Bobby Baccalieri Sr.'s Lumina as he is driving away from the murder scene is "Sister Golden Hair" by America; Bobby Sr.'s car crashes as the line "I just can't make it" was sung in the main chorus.
- The song playing in the restaurant when Artie and Charmaine are arguing and she says she will divorce him is "Jim Dandy" sung by LaVern Baker.
- The piece played while Artie Bucco and Adriana have dinner is "Concierto de Aranjuez" by Joaquin Rodrigo.

== Filming locations ==
Listed in order of first appearance:

- Totowa, New Jersey
- Newark, New Jersey
- St. Patrick's Church in Jersey City, New Jersey
- Long Island City, Queens
- Jersey City, New Jersey
- Fountains of Wayne in Wayne, New Jersey
- Garfield, New Jersey
- Hackensack, New Jersey
- Robert Treat Hotel in Newark, New Jersey
