= Proshai, Livushka =

- The Sopranos episode
- Episode no.: Season 3 Episode 2
- Directed by: Tim Van Patten
- Written by: David Chase
- Cinematography by: Phil Abraham
- Production code: 301
- Original air date: March 4, 2001
- Running time: 57 minutes

Episode chronology
| ← Previous "Mr. Ruggerio's Neighborhood" | Next → "Fortunate Son" |
- The Sopranos season 3

"Proshai, Livushka" is the 28th episode of the HBO original series The Sopranos and the second of the show's third season. It was written by David Chase and directed by Tim Van Patten, and originally aired on March 4, 2001.

== Starring ==
- James Gandolfini as Tony Soprano
- Lorraine Bracco as Dr. Jennifer Melfi
- Edie Falco as Carmela Soprano
- Michael Imperioli as Christopher Moltisanti
- Dominic Chianese as Corrado Soprano, Jr.
- Steven Van Zandt as Silvio Dante
- Tony Sirico as Paulie Gualtieri
- Robert Iler as Anthony Soprano, Jr.
- Jamie-Lynn Sigler as Meadow Soprano
- Drea de Matteo as Adriana La Cerva
- Aida Turturro as Janice Soprano
- John Ventimiglia as Artie Bucco
- Federico Castelluccio as Furio Giunta
- Steven R. Schirripa as Bobby Baccalieri
- Robert Funaro as Eugene Pontecorvo
- Kathrine Narducci as Charmaine Bucco
- Nancy Marchand as Livia Soprano
- Joe Pantoliano as Ralph Cifaretto

=== Guest starring ===
- Jerry Adler as Hesh Rabkin

==== Also guest starring ====
- Peter Riegert as Assemblyman Zellman
- Tom Aldredge as Hugh DeAngelis
- Suzanne Shepherd as Mary DeAngelis
- Alla Kliouka as Svetlana Kirilenko
- Vincent Curatola as Johnny Sack
- John Fiore as Gigi Cestone
- Joseph R. Gannascoli as Vito Spatafore
- Dan Grimaldi as Patsy Parisi
- George Loros as Raymond Curto
- Richard Maldone as Albert Barese
- Vincent Pastore as Pussy Bonpensiero
- Gregalan Williams as Reverend James, Jr.
- Patrick Tully as Noah Tannenbaum
- Nicole Burdette as Barbara Giglione
- Ralph Lucarelli as Cozzarelli
- Peter McRobbie as Father Felix
- Sharon Angela as Rosalie Aprile
- Jason Cerbone as Jackie Aprile, Jr.
- Tim Gallin as Joseph Zachary
- Marcia Haufrecht as Fanny
- Maureen Van Zandt as Gabriella Dante
- Vito Antuofermo as Bobby Zanone
- Dimitri de Fresco as Young Man
- Marie Donato as 2 to 5 / 7 to 9
- Katalin Pota as Lilliana Wosilius
- Ed Vassallo as Tom Giglione
- Gary Evans as FBI Tech #2
- Frank Pando as Agent Grasso
- Carlos Lopez as FBI Tech
- Michael Strano as FBI Agent

== Synopsis ==
Meadow and her friend from college, Noah Tannenbaum, watch The Public Enemy, one of Tony's favorite films. Tony arrives and converses with Noah privately. He subtly tries to determine Noah's ethnicity, and after several indirect questions Noah states that he is half Jewish and half African-American. Tony makes some racist remarks and urges him to stop seeing his daughter. Noah swears at him and storms out. Still somewhat shaken from the encounter, Tony goes to the kitchen; he sees a box of Uncle Ben's Rice, triggering a panic attack.

Tony confronts Ralphie Cifaretto, an ambitious and effective member of Richie Aprile's crew, and Albert Barese about a sanitation dispute. He urges them not to start any more fires that may attract press attention. Instead, Ralphie has a man beaten up with baseball bats. Separately, Ray Curto meets his handler from the FBI; he is 'cooperating'.

Tony visits his mother Livia and asks her not to say anything to the feds about the stolen airline tickets. As ever, she is combative and seems to stonewall him. Exasperated, he walks out. That evening, Livia dies from a stroke. Later, Tony tells Dr. Melfi, "I'm glad she's dead." Then he bursts out that he is "a bad son".

Tony's sister Barbara informs him that Janice will not be coming for the funeral. He furiously calls her in Seattle and orders her to be on the next plane; she inveigles him into paying the fare. At the funeral home Janice insists that, contrary to her wishes, Livia be given a lavish funeral and, exasperated, Tony agrees. In Livia's house, Janice hammers at the basement wall. At the funeral, still at the graveside, she has a dispute with Livia's caregiver Svetlana about Livia's collection of records. Svetlana says Livia gave them to her; Janice orders her to give them back.

At the post-funeral reception at the Sopranos' house, Janice, against Tony's wishes, corrals everyone into the main room for a ceremony of remembrance. With some reluctance, one or two people speak in memory of Livia. Christopher, high on marijuana and cocaine, gives a rambling, unfocused speech. Tony slips outside, where he is confronted by an angry and drunk Artie Bucco, who remembers Livia telling him about Tony's torching of the Vesuvio. Artie goes back inside and seems ready to speak about it, but Carmela and her father Hugh give their blunt perspectives on Livia. Carmela then upbraids Tony, Janice, and Barbara for ignoring their mother's wishes and having an elaborate funeral. Artie ultimately remains silent.

Afterward, Tony continues watching The Public Enemy and becomes emotional when the main character's mother joyfully prepares her home for her son's return, not knowing that he is dead.

== First appearances ==
The episode marks the first appearance of:

- Ralph Cifaretto: A high-ranking soldier in the former Aprile crew who pushes to be made captain of said crew.
- Eugene Pontecorvo: A well-liked associate and soon-to-be made man in the Aprile crew.
- Noah Tannenbaum: A half-black, half-Jewish college student and potential boyfriend of Meadow's.
- Ronald Zellman: Assemblyman for Newark, New Jersey's Lower 8th Ward.

== Deceased ==
- Livia Soprano: dies from a massive stroke in her sleep.

== Title reference ==
- A Romanization of the Russian «Прощай, Ливушка»: "Farewell, little Livia." Said in Russian, as a toast in Livia's memory by her caregiver, Svetlana.

== Production ==
- Because of Nancy Marchand's death, David Chase decided that Livia should die as well. Livia's final scene was created using CGI with previous sound clips and scenes featuring Marchand. The cost was approximately $250,000.
- Joe Pantoliano (Ralph Cifaretto), Steve R. Schirripa (Bobby "Bacala" Baccalieri), Robert Funaro (Eugene Pontecorvo), John Ventimiglia (Artie Bucco), and Kathrine Narducci (Charmaine Bucco) are now billed in the opening credits as part of the main cast, but only in episodes in which they appear.
- This is the final episode in which Nancy Marchand is billed in the opening credits. Perhaps to indicate this (and her unusual CGI appearance), her name is preceded by the word 'With'. During the first two seasons, it had been preceded by the word 'And' (which is now the case for Joe Pantoliano).
- The episode was part two of a two-hour season premiere when it originally aired in 2001.
- Vincent Pastore makes a cameo in this episode, when Tony opens a closet door and Pussy is visible in the mirror.

== References to other media ==
- When Tony visits his mother for the final time, he brings her audiobooks of the novels The Horse Whisperer and Omertà.
- Meadow goes upstairs to get her Barenaked Ladies CD, leaving Tony and Noah alone.
- The book read by the FBI agent in the surveillance van was The Internet for Dummies.
- Various clips from the 1931 gangster film, The Public Enemy starring James Cagney, are featured throughout this episode.
- A.J's doing school work on the poem "Stopping by Woods on a Snowy Evening" by Robert Frost and Meadow helps him by explaining that snow white represents death. AJ thinks that black represented death. On his desk is a black lamp the same type the FBI bugged Tony's basement.
- The shot of the undertaker from inside a descending elevator references the character Amerigo Bonasera in The Godfather, as does the undertaker's reference to using "all of my power, all of my skill."
- Furio Giunta refers to the reality TV series Survivor, saying that someone should point a gun at the winner and demand 25% of the prize money.

== Music ==
- The song played over the end credits is "I'm Forever Blowing Bubbles" by Les Paul. That song is also prominent in The Public Enemy, which Tony watches in this episode.
- "Eyeless" by Slipknot is played in A.J.'s room.
- An organ rendition of Remo Giazotto's Adagio in G minor is playing during Livia's wake.
- "Shake It (Like You Just Made Bail)" by Shawn Smith is played while Christopher, Adriana, and Furio take drugs before the wake.
- The song played by Janice on the stereo, in honor of her mother, is "If I Loved You" by Jan Clayton, from the original Broadway cast recording of Carousel.
- The song playing at the start of the episode when a firebomb is detonated in the garbage truck is "I'm Your Captain (Closer to Home)" by Grand Funk Railroad.

== Filming locations ==
Listed in order of first appearance:

- Paterson, New Jersey
- North Caldwell, New Jersey
- Verona, New Jersey
- Belleville, New Jersey
- Totowa, New Jersey
- Jersey City and Harsimus Cemetery in Jersey City, New Jersey
