= Second Opinion (The Sopranos) =

- The Sopranos episode
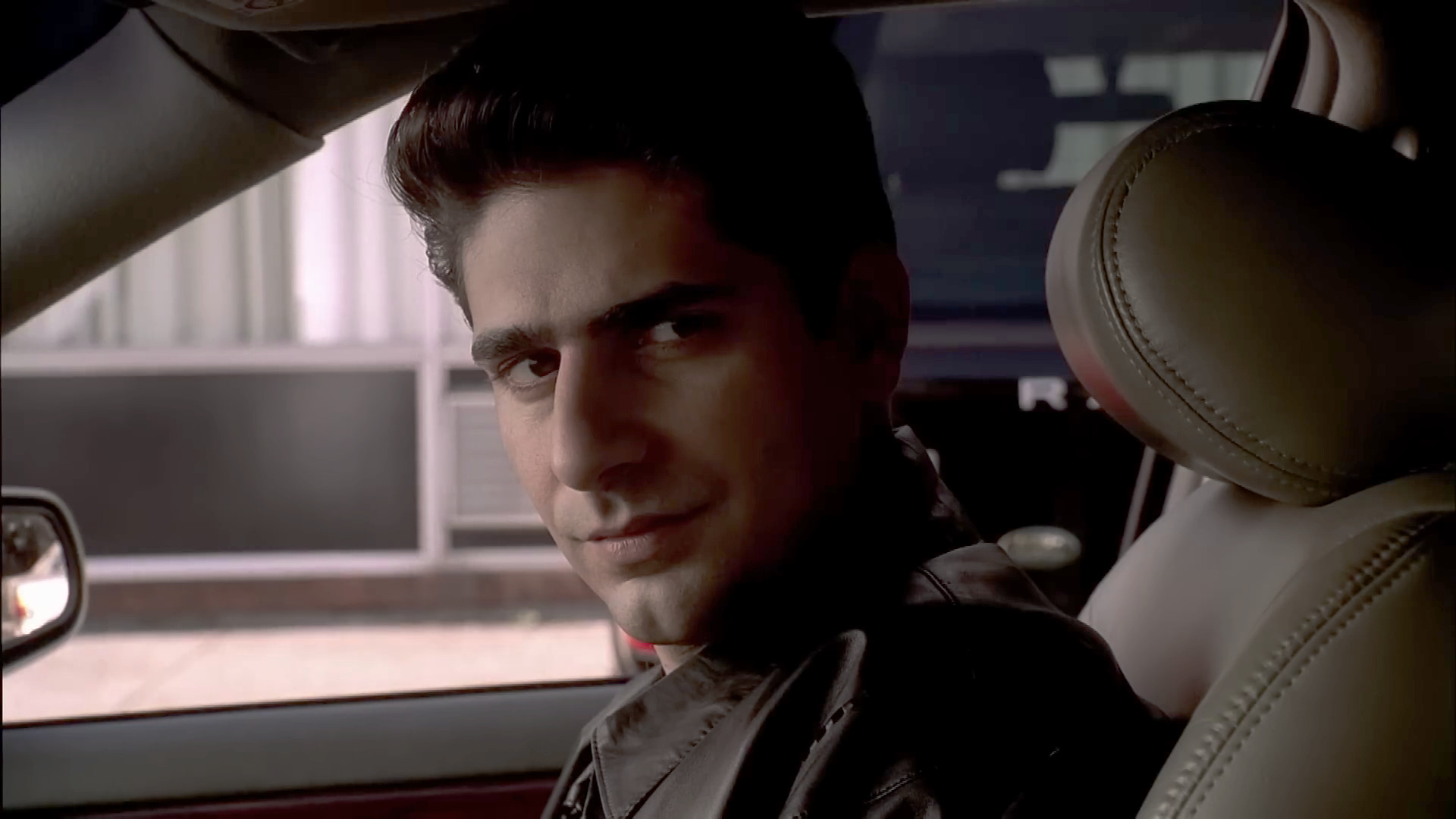
- Christopher Moltisanti talking to Paulie Gualtieri
- Episode no.: Season 3 Episode 7
- Directed by: Tim Van Patten
- Written by: Lawrence Konner
- Cinematography by: Phil Abraham
- Production code: 307
- Original air date: April 8, 2001
- Running time: 59 minutes

Episode chronology
← Previous "University"	Next → "He Is Risen"
- The Sopranos season 3

"Second Opinion" is the 33rd episode of the HBO original series The Sopranos and the seventh of the show's third season. It was written by Lawrence Konner and directed by Tim Van Patten, and originally aired on April 8, 2001.

== Starring ==
- James Gandolfini as Tony Soprano
- Lorraine Bracco as Dr. Jennifer Melfi
- Edie Falco as Carmela Soprano
- Michael Imperioli as Christopher Moltisanti
- Dominic Chianese as Corrado Soprano, Jr.
- Steven Van Zandt as Silvio Dante
- Tony Sirico as Paulie Gualtieri
- Robert Iler as Anthony Soprano, Jr.
- Jamie-Lynn Sigler as Meadow Soprano
- Drea de Matteo as Adriana La Cerva
- Aida Turturro as Janice Soprano *
- Federico Castelluccio as Furio Giunta
- Steven R. Schirripa as Bobby Baccalieri

* = credit only

=== Guest starring ===
- Tom Aldredge as Hugh De Angelis
- Sully Boyar as Dr. Krakower
- Dan Grimaldi as Patsy Parisi
- Tony Hale as RN Collins
- Toni Kalem as Angie Bonpensiero
- Sam McMurray as Dr. John Kennedy
- Suzanne Shepherd as Mary De Angelis
- Frank Wood as Dean Ross

== Synopsis ==
There is rising tension between Christopher and Paulie. As a newly made man, Chris is facing more scrutiny from the family and is liable to be strip-searched. Paulie makes him strip in the back room of the Bada Bing and makes fun of his penis size. Later, he and Patsy go to Chris's apartment unannounced and search his belongings. Chris sees Paulie sniffing Adriana's panties. Tony dismisses Chris's complaint, but speaks to Paulie anyway.

Paulie warns Chris never to complain about him again to the "big man", but they share a laugh together over a Big Mouth Billy Bass. While Silvio and Furio are also amused by the fish prop, it reminds Tony of his dream of Pussy Bonpensiero speaking to him as a dead fish on a slab. Upon finding out that it was Georgie who had brought in the fish prop, an enraged Tony smashes it against his head.

Carmela runs into Pussy's widow Angie at a supermarket. Angie says that, though Tony is helping her financially, things are hard and she cannot afford an operation for her poodle. Carmela tells Tony, who goes to Angie's home and sees that she has purchased a new Cadillac. He smashes its windows and lights with a baseball bat, telling her she should speak about money only to him. Elsewhere, Carmela has lunch with a dean from Columbia University. Tony refuses to go or donate more than $5,000, insisting that the dean is trying to extort her. The dean tells Carmela that his research indicates that the Sopranos could contribute as much as $50,000.

Meanwhile, Junior has complete faith in his surgeon, Dr. John Kennedy. He does not know that Kennedy erred, removing too little of the tissue surrounding his tumor. When Kennedy says he would like to perform further surgery, Junior agrees, but Tony believes Junior is too impressed by the doctor's name. They consult another doctor, who recommends that Junior receive chemotherapy treatments. A tumor board review is called, and they reach the same conclusion. Junior undergoes chemo and suffers distressing side effects. He longs to speak to Kennedy, who does not return his calls. Tony and Furio confront Kennedy on his golf course to bribe and intimidate him into giving Junior his attention. Kennedy appears at the hospital, reassures Junior and gives him his home phone number.

Carmela attends a session alone with Dr. Melfi on a day when Tony does not want to go. She stresses that she does not need therapy herself, but she makes an appointment with the therapist Melfi recommends. Carmela finds this therapist, Dr. Krakower, judgmental, as he does not mince words; upon hearing about her relationship with Tony and his involvement in the Mafia, he tells Carmela she is enabling Tony and that the only way to find peace is to take their children and leave him. He refuses payment, stating he will not accept "blood money", and concludes the session by flatly telling Carmela, "One thing you can never say is that you haven't been told."

Emotionally overwhelmed, Carmela lies on a sofa at home, wrapped in a blanket. When Tony returns home, she tells him that she has spoken to the dean on the phone, and promised $50,000. He balks, but she says this is something he must do for her. He relents, and they go out for dinner.

== Title reference ==
- Uncle Junior seeks a second opinion from another doctor for his cancer treatment.
- The title could also refer to Carmela receiving a second opinion on her relationship with Tony, from Dr. Krakower.

== Other cultural references ==
- Dr. Krakower tells Carmela that Tony should read Crime and Punishment by Fyodor Dostoevsky after turning himself in for his crimes.
- Carmela picks up The Theory of the Leisure Class by Thorstein Veblen, which Meadow dismisses as "basic"; Carmela then tells Meadow she is reading the new Barbara Kingsolver.
- When Christopher brings home shoes for Adriana, she's watching the "Wallpaper" episode of Everybody Loves Raymond.
- Adriana tells Christopher that she once performed oral sex on Penn Jillette of Penn and Teller fame in a public restroom.
- The episode features the toy Big Mouth Billy Bass, a popular singing animatronic fish from the late 1990s that most of Tony's crew get a kick out of. However, Tony is reminded too strongly of his best friend whom he was forced to kill (and more specifically, the dream where Pussy appeared to him as a talking fish).
- Junior refers to a senior health issue of the magazine U.S. News & World Report when chastising Bobby for not asking better questions of his doctor.
- Tony questions Junior's admiration for John F. Kennedy by bringing up "Hoffa and the Teamsters"; Junior corrects him that it was Robert Kennedy who, as United States Attorney General, tried to take down Mafia involvement with labor unions.

== Music ==
- The song played when Carmela visits Meadow at Columbia and, again, over the end credits is a live version of "Black Books" by Nils Lofgren.
- A remix of "Mysterious Ways" by U2 is playing in the Bing when Tony beats up Georgie with the Billy Bass.
- The songs sung by the Big Mouth Billy Bass are "Take Me to the River" by Al Green and "Y.M.C.A." by The Village People. "Y.M.C.A." was a specially-recorded version for the toy by The Sopranos prop department after the originally planned song, "Don't Worry, Be Happy" by Bobby McFerrin, was not allowed to be licensed for the show by McFerrin, who disliked the adult content of the TV series.
- Bach's Goldberg Variations is playing when Carmela has lunch with the dean of Columbia University.

== Awards ==
Edie Falco won her second Primetime Emmy Award for Outstanding Lead Actress in a Drama Series for her performance in this episode.
