= The Only Girl =

The Only Girl may refer to:

- The Only Girl (book), a 2018 memoir by Robin Green
- The Only Girl (film), 1933 film
- The Only Girl (musical), 1914 Broadway musical by Victor Herbert and Henry Blossom
