= He Is Risen =

He is Risen can refer to:

- A paschal greeting at Easter
- "He is Risen" (The Sopranos), an episode of the television series The Sopranos
