= The Only Girl (book) =

2018 book by Robin Green

The Only Girl: My Life and Times on the Masthead of Rolling Stone
- Author: Robin Green
- Language: English
- Publisher: Little, Brown and Company
- Publication date: August 21, 2018
- Pages: 304
- ISBN: 978-0-316-44002-8

The Only Girl: My Life and Times on the Masthead of Rolling Stone is a 2018 memoir by Robin Green. It is about her experience as the first female writer on the masthead of the Rolling Stone magazine.
