= Denise Borino-Quinn =

American actress (1964–2010)

- Born: January 6, 1964; Roseland, New Jersey, U.S.
- Died: October 27, 2010 (aged 46); Morristown, New Jersey, U.S.
- Occupation: Actress
- Years active: 2001–2007
- Television: The Sopranos
- Spouse: Luke Quinn Jr. (m. 2005; died 2010)

Denise Borino-Quinn (January 6, 1964 – October 27, 2010) was an American television actress known for her recurring role as Ginny Sacrimoni, the wife of New York mob boss Johnny Sack in the television series The Sopranos.

== Early life ==
She was born in Roseland, New Jersey, on January 6, 1964. She attended West Essex High School.

== Career ==
Borino-Quinn worked as a legal assistant in the New Brunswick, New Jersey, office of the law firm Hoagland, Longo, Moran, Dunst & Doukas, LLP.

In 2000, Borino-Quinn attended the casting call for The Sopranos in Harrison, New Jersey, for the role of Ginny Sacrimoni, the wife of New York mob boss Johnny Sack, to support a friend. Borino-Quinn appeared in 17 episodes of the series.

== Personal life ==
After The Sopranos ended in 2007, Borino-Quinn lost 175 pounds (79 kg) via stomach stapling. She married Luke Quinn, Jr. (1964–2010) in 2005, and they lived in Bordentown, New Jersey. He died on March 27, 2010, at his home at age 45. She died seven months after her husband, from liver cancer, on October 27, 2010, aged 46.
