= Henry Bronchtein =

American film director

Henry J. Bronchtein is an American director, producer and production manager known for his work on the HBO television series The Sopranos.

== Early life and education ==
Henry Bronchtein was born and raised in Bensonhurst, Brooklyn and attended New York City Public Schools. After managing the stage crew for numerous productions in high school, he studied drama at New York University's Undergraduate Institute of Film.

== Career ==
Having made three films with director Paul Mazursky, his credits include the award-winning Enemies, a Love Story. Further credits as a first assistant director consist of A Perfect Murder, Addicted to Love, Weekend at Bernie's, It Could Happen to You, Guarding Tess, Striptease, Rookie of the Year, and Eddie and the Cruisers.

In addition to his work as co-executive producer on The Sopranos, Bronchtein has directed four episodes of the program: "Nobody Knows Anything", "From Where to Eternity", "Fortunate Son", and "Pie-O-My". "Nobody Knows Anything" and "From Where to Eternity" were nominated for best direction by the Directors Guild of America.

In 2017, he directed "Private Woodhull," an episode from the fourth season of Turn: Washington's Spies.
