= Bobby Baccalieri =

Fictional character

- The Sopranos character
- Steve Schirripa as Bobby Baccalieri
- First appearance: "Do Not Resuscitate" (2000)
- Last appearance: "The Blue Comet" (2007)
- Created by: David Chase
- Portrayed by: Steve Schirripa

In-universe information
- Full name: Robert Baccalieri Jr.
- Aliases: Bobby Bacala; Jim Blake
- Nicknames: Bobby Bacala; Calzone with Legs; Burger Boy; Buddha
- Title(s): Soldier (seasons 2–4); Captain (seasons 4–6a); Underboss (season 6b)
- Occupation: Waiter, Airbag Service Technician, Windows Installation Contractor for the State of New Jersey Department of Community Affairs, Division of Housing and Community Resources
- Family: Bobby Baccalieri Sr. (father); Mary Baccalieri (sister); Christina Baccalieri (sister); Salvatore Intile (compadre)
- Spouses: Karen Baccalieri (deceased); Janice Soprano Baccalieri
- Children: Bobby Baccalieri III (son); Sophia Baccalieri (daughter); Domenica Baccalieri (daughter)
- Relatives: Tony Soprano (brother-in-law); Carmela Soprano (sister-in-law); Livia Soprano (mother-in-law); Johnny Boy Soprano (father-in-law); Junior Soprano (uncle-in-law); Meadow Soprano (niece-in-law); A.J. Soprano (nephew-in-law); Christopher Moltisanti (cousin-in-law); Barbara Giglione (sister-in-law); Tara Zincone (niece)
- Nationality: Italian-American

Robert Baccalieri Jr., portrayed by Steve Schirripa, is a fictional character on the HBO series The Sopranos. He is nicknamed "Bobby Bacala". A third-generation gangster, Bobby is first shown as a soldier and then later top aide to Corrado "Junior" Soprano. Throughout the series, he rises through the ranks of the crime organization, eventually becoming a close confidant of Tony, his brother-in-law.

== Family background ==
Bobby Sr. fathered Bobby Jr. at 31 or 32 years old. In the episode "Soprano Home Movies", Bobby states his grandfather had fled Italy to the United States due to political conflict during the Fascist regime, illegally entering through Montreal. In "For All Debts Public and Private", Bobby mentions that in 2002 his mother is 69 and that following the September 11 attacks her mental health has gone downhill. It is implied that his parents are separated or divorced.

Bobby was the son of Bobby Baccalieri Sr., a highly respected mobster (whom Tony referred to as "a real terminator"), who fronted as a barber. Bobby's father appeared in "Another Toothpick" played by Burt Young. Suffering from lung cancer, he came out of retirement when Tony gave him the order to murder Salvatore "Mustang Sally" Intile, Bobby Sr.'s godson, in Staten Island. The hit was ordered as retribution for the savage unprovoked beating of Bryan Spatafore, brother of Vito Spatafore.

Bobby Sr. died after losing control of his car and crashing into a signpost while leaving the scene of the successful Mustang Sally hit, which Bobby found very distressing. Before joining Junior Soprano's crew, Bobby was a head waiter until at least 1986, and was trained by his father, Bobby Sr.

== Biography ==
In "Soprano Home Movies," when discussing Bobby Baccalieri after the fight, Tony Soprano thought he was 42 or 43, making him born in 1964 or 1965. Bobby, unlike many of his fellow wiseguys, was big-hearted and quite shy. He ran Junior Soprano's old loan shark business. Bobby was a captain who ran Junior Soprano's old crew and he reported directly to Junior, and later to Tony. Before his death, it was thought he was preparing for the job of boss if Tony were to be killed or arrested.

At some point, Bobby became a made man, although without making his bones (committing murder). Bobby was married to Karen Baccalieri and lived in Verona, New Jersey, until her death in a car crash. They had two children, Bobby III and Sophia.

Bobby was quite different from the other men in the Soprano crime family. Within the family he was quiet, almost shy, kind-hearted, and even-tempered. These traits made him well-liked if not necessarily respected. He was obese, which brought him much ridicule, but he was very loyal and even Tony apologized to him after making cracks about his weight.

In turn, Bobby was always respectful, and sometimes affectionate, towards Tony, telling him, "I always liked you", in the aftermath of a feud that saw Tony order the deaths of several members of Junior Soprano's crew that Bobby was in. He bore no lasting grudges against Paulie Gualtieri or Christopher Moltisanti, who carried out these hits, and appeared briefly looking delighted on the day Christopher was inducted.

Bobby operated Junior Soprano's loan shark business in his stead and acted as Junior's assistant while Junior was under house arrest on federal racketeering charges. Junior eventually rewarded him by putting Bobby in charge of his loan shark operation during the later part of his prosecution. Bobby was made capo when Junior had Murf Lupo step down in "For All Debts Public and Private".

Bobby was very loyal to his wife, Karen, and (as revealed in "Christopher") was the only made man in the Soprano crew without a comare. The only time he was ever seen with another woman other than his wife was in the episode "University." When Ralphie walks back into the Bada Bing after beating Tracee to death, Bobby could be seen talking to another stripper. Bobby lost his wife in a car accident and took it especially hard, refusing to eat a tray of ziti she put in the freezer prior to her death. Following Karen's death, Janice Soprano, along with many other women, pursued Bobby, trying to help him out as much as possible, by cooking and watching over Bobby's two children, but also trying to initiate a relationship with him.

When his grief continued, Janice went so far as to use the internet to expose his children to a Ouija board within their house. This frightened them and cleared a path for Janice to demonstrate that Bobby's grief was affecting his children. Despite Bobby's initial reluctance, the two were soon married and together had a daughter, Domenica. Bobby remained unaware of his wife's machinations at the start of their relationship. Bobby also enjoyed playing with model trains.

Since 2001, when he assisted Tony in rescuing Christopher Moltisanti and Paulie Gualtieri from the Pine Barrens, Bobby grew closer to Tony. As Ralph Cifaretto put it, "Dating the boss's sister will help a made man's career". Tony had recently stepped up his expectations of Bobby, who he felt was taking their newfound family relationship as an excuse not to earn at a competitive level, compared to other members of the family. Bobby rose to the occasion by supplementing his income with the $7,000 he received for using his skills as a marksman to non-fatally shoot a rapper he met at the hospital in the buttocks, while Tony was in the ICU, in order to raise the rapper's profile.

In the episode "The Ride" Bobby's wife, son, and youngest daughter were involved in a ride accident at the feast of St. Elzear, while he took his other daughter to the bathroom. Bobby's initial reaction was relief that his family was unhurt. However, at a Sunday dinner at the Soprano residence, Janice berated Bobby for not standing up for them. She later accompanied him when he paid a visit to the ride's owner.

Bobby stormed into his motel room, beat him up, and tried to extort money from him but learned that Paulie Gualtieri had been responsible for withholding the funds needed to repair the ride. Bobby tracked Paulie down at the festival and angrily confronted him. The two were separated by other associates in the crime family. At Christopher's belated bachelor party, Bobby left soon after Paulie arrived. Tony ordered Paulie to make things right with Bobby. The episode demonstrated Bobby's devotion to his family, but also confirmed his credentials as a man not to be taken lightly, further cementing his position in the higher echelons of the family.

In the episode, "Moe N' Joe", Bobby was beaten and robbed by a street gang as he was making his collections. One of the gang members fired a shot at the sidewalk near Bobby's face and a concrete fragment injured his right eye. The injury left his sight in the eye uncertain and Carlo suspected that he might need a corneal transplantation. Despite the injury, Bobby made certain his payments reached Tony, by way of a concerned Carlo Gervasi, who visited Bobby at the hospital.

Bobby's injury prompted Tony to reassess his relationship with his sister and brother-in-law. Tony's feelings of guilt prompted him to broker an agreement with Johnny Sack that allowed Bobby and his family to buy Sack's house at half price.

In the episode "Soprano Home Movies", during a Monopoly game with Bobby, Carmela, and Janice, Tony began to make rude remarks toward Janice in reference to her promiscuous behavior as a younger woman, which Bobby took as a disrespectful affront. Unexpectedly, a usually meek and passive Bobby launched his fist into Tony's face, knocking him to the floor. Bobby won the fight, battering the inebriated Tony quite severely but also injuring his boss's pride. Tony, although reasonably gracious in defeat, was embarrassed at having been defeated in a brawl, especially by Bobby of all people. Tony frequently asserted to Bobby, Janice, and Carmela that he would have won the fight had he not slipped on the rug nor undergone such physical impotence after being shot by Uncle Junior.

As a partial result of this awkward incident, Bobby was tasked with going to Montreal to murder the brother-in-law of one of Tony's Québécois associates, an important hit that formed part of a deal to save money on a pharmaceuticals racket. It was Bobby's first murder. Tony mentioned earlier that Bobby had never "popped his cherry" with wetwork though Bobby was quite remorseful after committing the hit.

Bobby's attitude was affected by Tony's plan to promote him to Acting Boss. Tony wanted to bring Bobby up into the administration of the organization, because his earlier plan of positioning Christopher Moltisanti as his emissary and eventual heir had failed, following their personal falling out and eventually Chris's death/murder. While Paulie Walnuts nominally held the title of Underboss, Bobby attended high-level meetings and sit-downs alongside Tony and Silvio Dante, identifying him as a high-ranking capo.

Even though Bobby was just a capo at the time, he was still consulted in strategy sessions, such as when Tony consulted Bobby about what to do about Phil Leotardo's attempts to displace him as boss of the family. A few years earlier, Tony would have never brought Bobby into such a high-level discussion. Unlike Chris Moltisanti, Bobby neither took Tony's trust for granted nor his new position lightly. Conscious of his rise from soldier to captain and then underboss, Bobby worked hard to keep Tony's trust and respect, rather than simply coasting on his goodwill as Moltisanti had. His loyalty and work ethic did not go unnoticed or unappreciated by Tony.

Bobby's rise and industriousness did not go unnoticed by the other families. When his name was brought up at a meeting of top New York associates and one of them (played by Dominic Chianese Jr.) mocked his rise by noting that he'd originally been Junior Soprano's driver, Albie Cianflone defended Bobby, noting that almost all "Mafiosi" started doing work considered low-level or menial.

When war erupted between the DiMeo and Lupertazzi Families in the episode "The Blue Comet", New York boss Phil Leotardo ordered the deaths of the DiMeo family's top three "guys": Bobby, Silvio, and Tony. FBI agent Dwight Harris informed Tony at Satriale's that a snitch in Brooklyn had implied that Phil had ordered a major hit on the New Jersey crew. Tony then gave orders to inform everyone of the upcoming assassination plot.

Bobby left his cell phone behind as he entered a hobby shop, preventing him from receiving the warning call. While Bobby was looking at a vintage Blue Comet train set, two men entered the store and opened fire. Several gunshots sent Bobby's bullet riddled body crashing on top of a model train display.

Later in the episode, when a saddened Tony reflects on Bobby's death while holding the assault rifle that Bobby gave him on his birthday, Tony flashes back to the moment when he and Bobby were fishing, contemplating their own fates. Bobby observes that when getting killed, you "probably don't even hear it when it happens, right?". With Janice now a widow, she asks Uncle Junior for money, now living in state care. The approach fails as Junior's advancing dementia has made him forget where his secret funds are hidden. During a conversation with Janice it is mentioned that Bobby Jr. has opted to live with his mothers sister and that Janice will use Nica in order to emotionally blackmail Sophia into staying, Tony aware of the real reason leaves quietly disgusted. Tony, although estranged from Junior, later visits his uncle and firmly tells him that if he does recall where his money is, the money will go straight to Bobby's children, with Tony overseeing it.

== Character origins ==
By chance, Steve Schirripa was in New York City in June 1999 for a friend's wedding. Around that time he was invited for an audition in New York City, initially for Agent Skip Lipari, and later for the role of Baccalieri. He played Baccalieri for five seasons. For the first two seasons, he wore a fatsuit to fit the role, but this was later removed.
