= Mitchell Burgess =

American writer and producer

- Occupations: Television writer, producer
- Spouse: Robin Green
- Writing career
- Notable works: The Sopranos, Blue Bloods

Mitchell Burgess is an American writer and producer. He was a writer and an executive producer on The Sopranos. He was a creator and executive producer for Blue Bloods. He frequently works with his wife Robin Green.

== Career ==
The Sopranos, Northern Exposure and Mr. & Mrs. Smith are some of the TV series that he has written for.

In 2010 Burgess worked as an executive consultant and writer on the second season of the police drama Southland. Green and Burgess were the creators of Blue Bloods, which premiered in fall 2010 on CBS.

== Personal life ==
Burgess is married to his Sopranos co-writer Robin Green, whom he met when they were students at the University of Iowa.

== Awards ==
He has been nominated for eleven Emmy Awards for The Sopranos and has won three.
