= Robert Funaro =

American film and television actor (born 1959)

- Born: January 23, 1959 (age 67); Brooklyn, New York, U.S.
- Other name: Bobby Funaro
- Occupation: Actor
- Years active: 2001–present

Robert Funaro (born January 23, 1959) is an American film and television actor. Funaro is best known for his portrayal of Eugene Pontecorvo, a conflicted hitman in the Emmy Award-winning television series The Sopranos.

Funaro appeared in the 2007 film American Gangster as Detective McCann and in 2012 appeared on the tenth episode of the second season of the CBS show Blue Bloods, titled "Whistle Blower" as NYPD Captain Browne.

== Background ==
Funaro was born in Brooklyn, New York. His Italian ancestors were from Naples.

He lives in Prince's Bay, Staten Island.

== Filmography ==
=== Film ===
Year	Title	Role	Notes
2004	Indocumentados		
2007	I Believe in America	Phil	
2007	American Gangster	McCann	
2011	Lost Revolution	Phil	
2012	Not Fade Away	Uncle Murf	
2012	Broadway's Finest	Larson	
2014	Charlie Mantle	Charlie Mantle	
2015	Disco!	Phil	
2018	Rich Boy, Rich Girl	Brad	
2019	The Irishman	Johnny - Friendly Lounge	
TBA	Volcanoes Rising	Roberto Rossellini	Pre-production

=== Television ===
Year	Title	Role	Notes
2001–2006	The Sopranos	Eugene Pontecorvo	26 episodes
2001–2009	Law & Order	Various	5 episodes
2002	Law & Order: Criminal Intent	Vinny Russo	1 episode
2002, 2003	Law & Order: Special Victims Unit	Philly Panzaretti / Police Officer	2 episodes
2009	The Unusuals	Officer Leach	5 episodes
2011	Gray Matters	Tavius Cavos	
2011	Rescue Me	Guy in Suit	1 episode
2011	Unforgettable	Herb Waters	1 episode
2011	Eden	Det. Charlie Paetracca	1 episode
2012	Blue Bloods	Captain Browne	Episode: "Whistle Blower"
2013	White Collar	Zev	1 episode
2015	Public Morals	Mr. Smith	1 episode
2016	Vinyl	Tony Del Greco	5 episodes
2017	The Sinner	Ron Tannetti	4 episodes
2019	Crazytown	Joey Credit	6 episodes
2019	Accountable	Carmine	1 episode
2019–2020	Ray Donovan	Lt. Bricker	5 episodes
2020	Bromance	Agent Benacquista	3 episodes
2020	For Nothing	Leonard Ciancetta Sr.	Post-production
2023	Around the Sun	Max	3 episodes
2026	Big Mistakes	Rocco	Recurring

=== Video games ===
Year	Title	Role
2008	Grand Theft Auto IV	Anthony Corrado
2012	Max Payne 3	The Local Population
