= Robin Green =

American writer and producer

- Born: July 31, 1945 (age 81); Providence, Rhode Island, U.S.
- Education: Brown University (B.A.); Iowa Writers' Workshop (MFA)
- Occupations: Television writer; Television producer; Journalist
- Spouse: Mitchell Burgess
- Writing career
- Notable works: The Sopranos, Blue Bloods

Robin Green (born July 31, 1945) is an American writer and producer. She was a writer and executive producer on the HBO series The Sopranos and was the co-creator and executive producer of the CBS series Blue Bloods. In the 1970s, Green was a writer for Rolling Stone.

== Biography ==
A Rhode Island native, Robin Green earned a Bachelor of Arts degree in American literature from Pembroke College in Brown University, and a Master of Fine Arts from the Iowa Writers' Workshop at the University of Iowa. Green is Jewish.

In 1968, Green worked as Marvel Comics' secretary-receptionist and "Gal Friday" for editor-in-chief Stan Lee.

After moving on from Marvel she spent time as a magazine journalist in such publications as Rolling Stone.

Upon entering the television industry as a writer, Green wrote and produced for such series as The Sopranos, Northern Exposure, A Year in the Life and Almost Grown, and wrote the Showtime TV movie Critical Choices. In 2010, Green worked as an executive consultant and writer on the second season of police drama Southland.

In August 2018 Little Brown and Company published Green's memoir, The Only Girl: My Life and Times on the Masthead of Rolling Stone.

Green is married to Sopranos co-writer Mitchell Burgess. Together, they created the CBS police procedural Blue Bloods, which premiered in 2010.

== Works ==
- Green, Robin (August 21, 2018). The Only Girl: My Life and Times on the Masthead of Rolling Stone. Little, Brown. ISBN 978-0-316-44005-9.

== Awards ==
Green won an Emmy Award for her work on the CBS series Northern Exposure. She was awarded Emmys for Best Writing of a Drama Series for episodes of The Sopranos in 2001 and 2003, as well as an Emmy for Outstanding Drama Series in 2004. In addition, she won two Peabody Awards and a Golden Globe Award for the series.
