= Janice Soprano =

Fictional character on the television series The Sopranos

- The Sopranos character
- Aida Turturro as Janice Soprano
- First appearance: "Down Neck" (1999, appeared as a child)
- Last appearance: The Many Saints of Newark (2021)
- Created by: David Chase
- Portrayed by: Aida Turturro; Madeline Blue (as a child); Juliet Fox (as a child); Alexandra Intrator (The Many Saints of Newark); Mattea Conforti (The Many Saints of Newark, young)

In-universe information
- Alias: Parvati Wasatch
- Nickname: Jan
- Occupation: Barista; furniture mover; musician; employee at Kenny Rogers Roasters; housewife
- Family: Johnny Soprano (father); Livia Soprano (mother); Tony Soprano (brother); Barbara Soprano Giglione (sister); Carmela Soprano (sister-in-law); A.J. Soprano (nephew); Meadow Soprano (niece); Junior Soprano (uncle); Ercole Soprano (uncle); Bobby Baccalieri, Sr. (father-in-law)
- Spouses: Eugène (1st husband); Richie Aprile (ex-fiancee); Ralph Cifaretto (ex-boyfriend); Bobby "Bacala" Baccalieri (2nd husband)
- Children: Harpo (son); Domenica Baccalieri (daughter); Bobby Baccalieri III (step-son); Sophia Baccalieri (step-daughter)
- Religion: Roman Catholic; Hindu; Born-again Christian
- Nationality: Italian-American

Janice Soprano Baccalieri is a fictional character in the HBO television drama series The Sopranos and in the film The Many Saints of Newark. She is the eldest sibling of the show's protagonist, Tony Soprano (James Gandolfini). On the show, she is portrayed by Aida Turturro, and a young Janice appears in flashbacks portrayed by Madeline Blue and Juliet Fox. Alexandra Intrator portrays a young Janice Soprano in the 2021 prequel film, The Many Saints of Newark.

== Background ==
Presented as the oldest child of mobster Johnny Boy Soprano and Livia Soprano in a household financed by crime; Janice grew complacent about her family's criminal ties. She is portrayed as having a very callous and rebellious nature.

In the show, after graduating from Sacred Heart High School, Janice joined an ashram in Venice, Los Angeles, the character adopting the name Parvati Wasatch. Janice, under her new name, traveled across Europe, staying in Paris, France, and Sri Lanka, and married a Québécois man named Eugène. In the series, the couple had a son named Harpo "Hal" named after the song "Harpo's Blues" by Phoebe Snow. Eugène later took him back to Montreal and Janice unsuccessfully tried to petition the State Department to have him returned to her.

She worked as a furniture mover and at an espresso bar in Olympia, Washington before finally moving back to New Jersey permanently. After returning to New Jersey, Janice is shown to re-invent herself from an aging rebel to an upscale, materialistic, North Jersey Italian housewife.

Janice is portrayed as a chronic malingerer, with the people around her often holding the opinion she is lazy and has no work ethic, filing for disability benefits in Washington for alleged carpal tunnel syndrome, and using her claim of newly contracted Epstein–Barr to excuse herself from her household duties.

Her relationship with Tony is often shown to be strained in nature, as he still holds her responsible for abandoning the family and leaving him to deal with their abusive mother alone.

== Biography ==
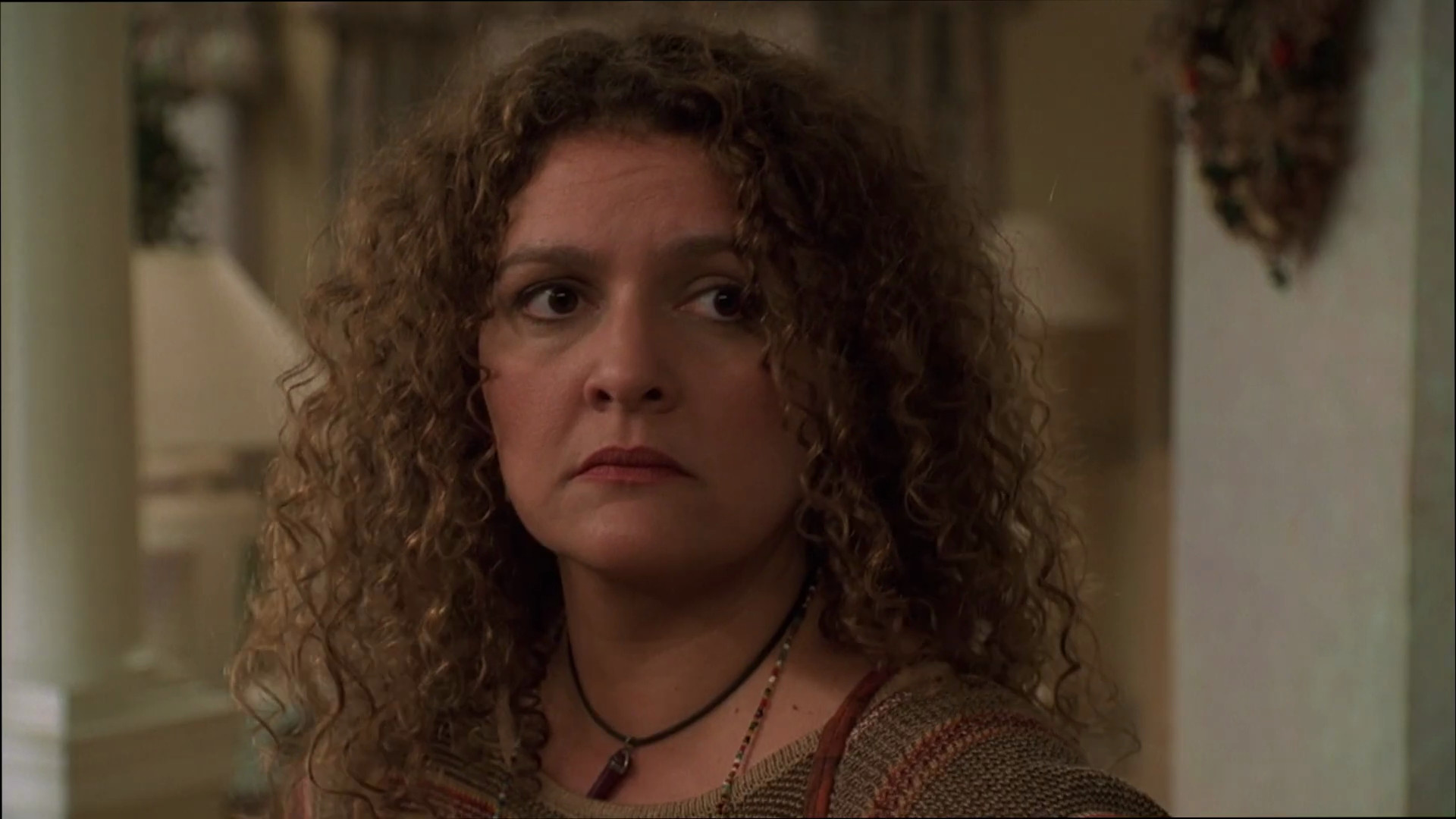
Janice in season 2

In season two, Janice returns to Newark, New Jersey, ostensibly to take care of her sick mother. Her high school boyfriend, Richie Aprile (David Proval), is a DiMeo crime family capo who is released from prison around the same time. When Tony and Richie begin feuding, Janice exacerbates the situation by telling Richie that he is being unfairly treated and even suggests making a move against Tony. Richie is initially reluctant to do so.

Richie causes problems for Tony that are only made more complicated by his engagement to Janice. Tony is unhappy with the engagement, and both Janice and Richie flaunt their status to Tony by planning an extravagant wedding and putting an offer on an expensive house in Short Hills, New Jersey despite Richie still having a no-show job working as a fishmonger.

Tony orders Richie killed after Uncle Junior (Dominic Chianese) informs him of Richie's plan to "move against him". After an incident of domestic violence in which Richie punches her in the face, Janice shoots and kills Richie and calls on her brother to dispose of the body. She then moves back to Seattle and becomes briefly engaged to a 19-year-old.

In season three, Janice returns to New Jersey following the death of her mother. After Livia's death, Janice emotionally blackmails Tony and Barbara into holding a service after her death. She becomes obsessed with acquiring her mother's valuable record collection, which Livia gave to her nurse, Svetlana (Alla Kliouka Schaffer). Janice, feeling that she should rightfully have the records, absconds with Svetlana's prosthetic leg. She tells Svetlana that the leg will not be returned until she receives the records. Svetlana has friends connected with the Russian Mafia who physically assault Janice until she reveals the location of the leg.

Tony visits her at the hospital and angrily tells her that since she has been assaulted, he is now forced to retaliate and risk facing a war with the Russians or else lose respect. After the assault against her, she briefly becomes a born-again Christian. Janice's next phase is marked by a brief interest in a Christian music career, as well as an equally brief live-in relationship with her narcoleptic boyfriend, Aaron Arkaway (Turk Pipkin).

In season four, after the death of Jackie Aprile Jr. (Jason Cerbone), Janice embarks on a clandestine relationship with Ralph Cifaretto (Joe Pantoliano), while he was is in a relationship with Jackie's mother Rosalie Aprile (Sharon Angela). With the help of her feminist therapist, Janice soon reaches the conclusion that her affair with Ralph is a mistake. After Karen's death in a car accident, Ralph uses the event as an excuse to end his relationship with Rosalie, he happily tells her that he is no longer seeing Rosalie Aprile and plans to move in with her, Janice responds by flying into a rage, pushing him down a flight of stairs and screaming at him to leave. Sometime later, Tony asks Janice about Ralph's bizarre sexual fetishes, of which he had recently become aware. She refuses to tell him anything at first, ostensibly to protect Ralph's privacy. When Tony offers her money, however, she immediately tells him everything he wants to know.

Following Ralph's disappearance, Janice sets her sights on the newly widowed Bobby Baccalieri (Steve Schirripa), another of Tony's caporegimes, whose fidelity to his wife while she was alive, and obvious adoration of her after her death makes him especially appealing. Initially, Janice serves Bobby's dinners, sometimes claiming other women's plates as her own, and informally dates him. Frustrated with Bobby's refusal to commit, she sends Bobby's children instant messages under a false screen name, claiming to be watching them, in an attempt to scare them.

This ploy succeeds, driving Bobby and his children into her arms for comfort from the supposed stalker. Although mainly acting out of her desires, she does help Bobby by pushing him to do a task for her uncle Junior that he has been putting off due to grief. She attends her uncle's racketeering trial and assists Bobby with taking care of Junior.

By the beginning of season five, Janice and Bobby are married. She is shown to have a difficult relationship with her stepchildren. She attacks a soccer player's mother at Sophia's Peewee soccer match and injures her badly enough to require hospitalization, garnering her an assault charge, and to Tony's displeasure, unwanted TV news coverage mentioning his name and line of work. Bobby insists that she attend anger management counseling. While it briefly has the desired effect, Tony, in doubt and jealous of Janice's newfound peace of mind, purposefully obstructs her progress by taunting her about her missing son.

By season six, Janice and Bobby have a baby girl together, Domenica. Janice encourages Tony to officially let Bobby take over Junior's old crew which causes the two to have an angry argument. One day when neither Janice nor Bobby can look after a mentally-declining Junior, Tony angrily volunteers. Confusing Tony for an associate he ordered murdered years ago, Junior shoots Tony in the abdomen. Janice is shown to be deeply affected by her brother's hospitalized state.

In the episode "Moe n' Joe", Janice is seen as a commanding force in the household, setting boundaries for both Bobby Jr and Bobby Sr. Janice confronts Tony about his disdain for Bobby, and Tony refuses to admit his true feelings on the subject: Tony blames Bobby—and Janice, to some extent—for his near-fatal shooting by Junior.

In the show, Tony angrily confides to Dr. Melfi (Lorraine Bracco) that Janice "gets nothing" because she didn't hold the same trauma and scars from their mother since she left home almost immediately after high school. Later in the episode, Tony lets go of his hostility and compensates Janice and Bobby by persuading an imprisoned John Sacrimoni (Vincent Curatola) to sell them his house at half price. Tony grows closer to Bobby, with Tony entrusting him with more responsibility and Bobby becoming a profitable player for the family in the process.

Janice and Bobby inherit the late Bobby, Sr.'s cottage in northern New York state, to which they invite Tony and Carmela (Edie Falco) for Tony's 47th birthday. At the party, Janice gives Tony a gift of Soprano family home videos. She tells Carmela an anecdote that embarrasses Tony over a heated, drunken game of Monopoly.

Bobby later loses his temper and punches Tony in the face after Tony makes offensive remarks about Janice, leading to a fight which Bobby wins, much to Tony's chagrin. As revenge, Tony orders Bobby, who has never killed anyone, to go to Canada and carry out a contract killing. Bobby wins Tony's favor defending Janice's honor, and he is soon elevated into Tony's inner circle, largely displacing Christopher Moltisanti (Michael Imperioli).

Janice suggests to Tony that he help pay to keep Uncle Junior — whose money has run out — in a private care facility, but Tony refuses and makes it clear Junior is dead to him. Angered by Janice and Bobby's perceived disloyalty, Tony tells her that he is going to exile Bobby from his life, although this is just an empty threat.

Soon after that conversation, Bobby is murdered by the hitmen of Phil Leotardo (Frank Vincent) while buying a model train in a hobby store, making Janice a widow. Tony visits her afterward, and after a brief conversation assures her that he is there for her if she needs him. Janice desires to continue raising Bobby's children, Bobby III and Sophia with her daughter Domenica, but their grandparents also seek custody. Their fate remains unknown, although the two have previously shown contempt for Janice and it is mentioned that Bobby III wants to live with his Aunt.

Janice's other focus seems to be on whatever assets she might receive including those from Uncle Junior. This prompts Tony to make a deal with "Uncle Pat" ensuring Junior's estate will go into a trust that will benefit Bobby's children and not Janice. Tony also extracts a promise from Phil Leotardo's men to pay a settlement to Janice, after Phil's vendetta against Tony led to Bobby's murder.
