= Junior Soprano =

Fictional character on the television series The Sopranos

- The Sopranos character
- Dominic Chianese as Junior Soprano
- First appearance: "The Sopranos" (1999)
- Last appearance: The Many Saints of Newark (2021)
- Created by: David Chase
- Portrayed by: Dominic Chianese; Rocco Sisto (flashbacks); Corey Stoll (The Many Saints of Newark)

In-universe information
- Full name: Corrado John Soprano Jr.
- Aliases: "Junior", "Uncle June"
- Nickname: "Mr. Magoo"
- Title(s): Captain (season 1); Boss (seasons 1–6a)
- Occupation: United Association union official; labor racketeer; drug trafficker; loanshark; bookie
- Family: Corrado Soprano Sr. (father); Mariangela D'Agostino Soprano (mother); Giovanni "Johnny Boy" Soprano (brother); Ercole Soprano (brother)
- Relatives: Frank Soprano (uncle); Tony Soprano (nephew); Janice Soprano (niece); A.J. Soprano (great-nephew); Barbara Soprano Giglione (niece)
- Religion: Roman Catholicism
- Nationality: Italian-American

Corrado John "Junior" Soprano Jr., portrayed by Dominic Chianese, is a fictional character from the HBO television series The Sopranos. Usually referred to as "Junior" or "Uncle Jun" (pronounced "June"), he is the ostensible boss of the DiMeo crime family for most of the series. However, he holds little to no influence due to his being positioned as a front boss by his nephew, Tony, who serves as the actual boss. A younger Corrado sometimes appears in flashbacks, played by Rocco Sisto. Corey Stoll portrays a young Junior Soprano in the 2021 prequel film, The Many Saints of Newark. Dominic Chianese's performance as Junior received critical acclaim, garnering two Emmy nominations for Outstanding Supporting Actor in a Drama Series.

Junior is depicted as being intelligent, old-fashioned, stubborn and insecure about his power. Although Junior is portrayed as bitter and deceitful in season one, he shows a more considerate and humorous side of himself in the later seasons. He reveals a more sensitive aspect of his personality during his illness and house arrest. According to series creator David Chase, the name Junior was taken from one of his cousins. Chianese landed the role of Junior over Tony Sirico who played Paulie Gualtieri, and Frank Vincent who later played Phil Leotardo.

== Background ==
In Season One, it's stated that Junior is 70 years old, placing his birth date in 1928 or 1929. Corrado Soprano, Jr. is the eldest of three sons of Corrado and Mariangela D'Agostino Soprano, who were from Ariano (an Italian town) and immigrated to the United States in 1911. Junior is the uncle of Tony Soprano (James Gandolfini). Junior had two younger brothers, Ercole "Eckley" Soprano and Giovanni "Johnny" Soprano. Eckley was intellectually disabled and lived in a mental institution for most of his life. Johnny Soprano, Junior's youngest brother, was Tony's father. Junior outlived both of his brothers, who died in the 1980s. When feigning mental incompetence, he tells the court-ordered psychologist that he was getting a haircut when he heard about the assassination of John F. Kennedy.

He tells Tony that he admired John F. Kennedy but didn't like his brother Robert because of the latter's involvement with the United States Senate Select Committee on Improper Activities in Labor and Management, as well as the prosecution of Jimmy Hoffa and investigation into the International Brotherhood of Teamsters. Tony fondly recalls how as a child, Junior taught him how to play baseball and took him to New York Yankees games. Junior also apparently enjoys surfing. He recounts fondly teaching Tony body surfing on the Jersey Shore as a child, and purchases AJ a $400 surfboard for his birthday.

Both Junior and Johnny dropped out of high school and turned to a life of organized crime, joining the DiMeo crime family. In the episode "In Camelot", Junior Soprano reveals that he was on a date with Fran Felstein at the 500 Club in Atlantic City, New Jersey to see Enzo Stuarti perform when Fran met his brother Johnny. Junior was in love with Fran and wanted to propose, even buying a ring for her, but couldn't allow a marriage to affect his status in organized crime or summon the courage to ask her.

Junior always watched over Tony, especially after Johnny's death from emphysema in 1986. Junior guided Tony's ascension into the crime family when Tony took over his father's crew becoming the family's youngest captain.

Following the arrest of longtime boss Ercole "Eckley" DiMeo in late 1995, Junior got into a trucking dispute with new acting boss Jackie Aprile Sr. (Michael Rispoli). He fled to Boca Raton to avoid any possible repercussions, but Tony and Soprano soldier "Big Pussy" Bonpensiero (Vincent Pastore) arranged a meeting to solve the problem. Junior sometimes resented having to answer to the young Aprile, who used to fetch Junior sambucas.

Junior never married and had no children. He lives in Belleville, New Jersey. He tells Bobby Baccalieri (Steve Schirripa) that he has a problem with feet, and does not even like talking about bunions.

== Plot details ==
=== The Many Saints of Newark ===
Junior steps in as an acting captain of brother Giovanni "Johnny Boy" Soprano's crew from 1967, after he is sent to prison. At the funeral of "Hollywood Dick" Moltisanti, Junior takes Richard "Dickie" Moltisanti aside and tells him he considers them to be brothers. He offers Dickie his hand in friendship and promises to provide any favors he requires.

Five years later, in 1972, Johnny Boy is released from prison and takes back the reins of his crew. To Junior's chagrin, Johnny reprimands him for apparently letting his neighborhood "fall apart" in his absence. Johnny urges his brother to follow Dickie's "example", but this only fractures the close relationship that Corrado once had with Dickie. It is clear that Johnny is beginning to hold Dickie favorably to his brother, who now sees Dickie as a rival, not a partner.

Sometime later, Junior attends the funeral of "Buddha" Bonpensiero, a made man killed by Harold McBrayer's African-American mob in a gangland hit. Corrado slips down the stairs of the mortuary, and Dickie laughs, mocking Junior as he struggles to get back onto his feet. Months later, Junior is further frustrated when his injury prevents him from having sex with his comare. Humiliated and enraged, Junior secretly orders a hit on Dickie Moltisanti, knowing it will be blamed on Harold's crew. Moltisanti is shot in the head from behind in the driveway of his home by an unknown assailant. At Moltisanti's own funeral, Corrado stares coldly at his corpse, content with the knowledge that Dickie's death will never come back to him.

=== The Sopranos ===
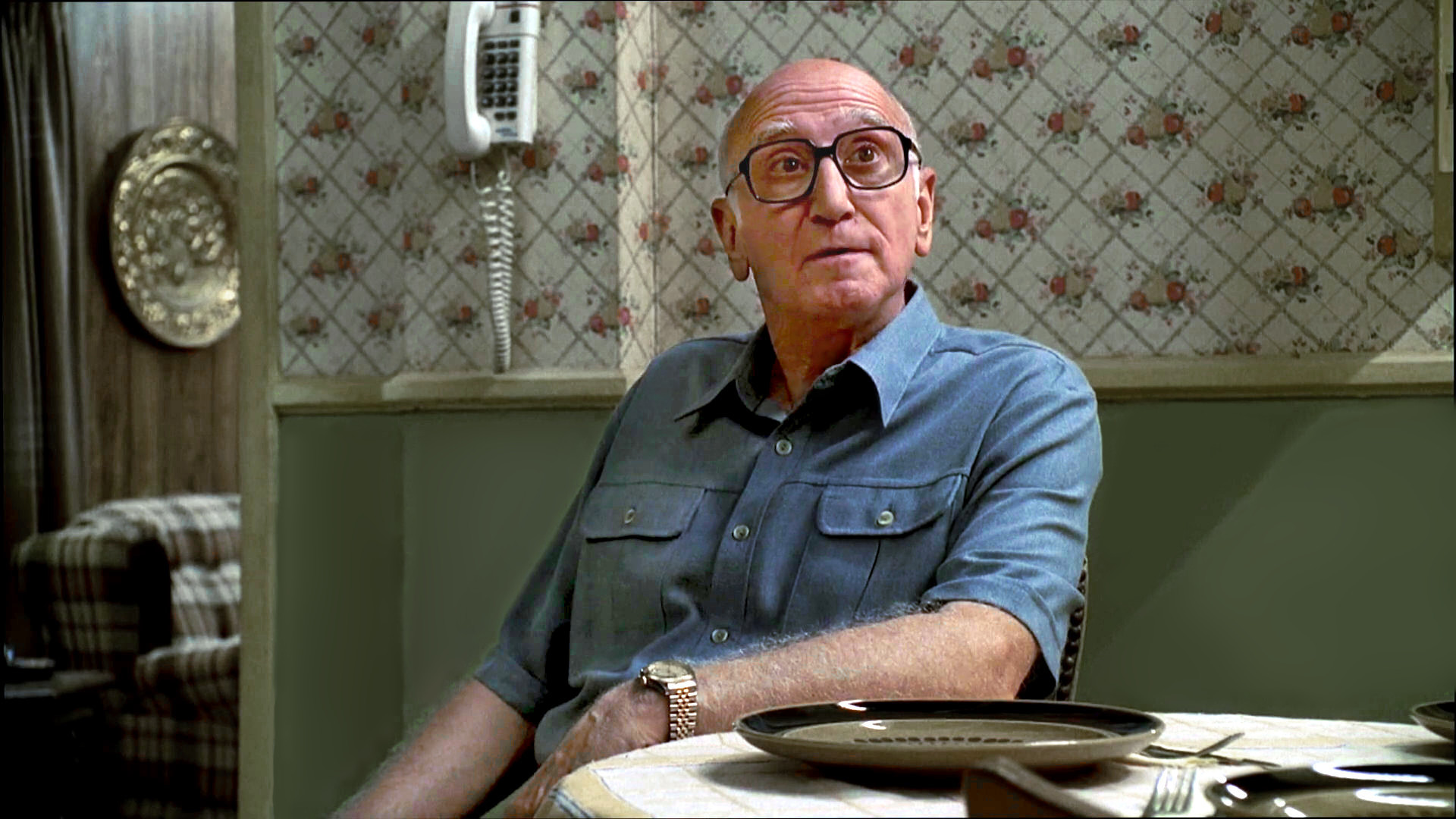
Junior Soprano

In the opening episode of the show, Junior plans to kill "Little Pussy" Malanga at a restaurant owned by Tony's childhood friend, Artie Bucco (John Ventimiglia). Tony makes many attempts to prevent the murder and eventually resorts to fire bombing the restaurant to force its closure so the hit would happen elsewhere, enraging Junior. Tensions escalate further when two of Tony's criminal associates Christopher Moltisanti (Michael Imperioli) and Brendan Filone (Anthony DeSando) hijack a truck owned by a Harrison, New Jersey, company that pays protection to Junior. Junior constantly expresses outrage and threats over the issue despite Tony's attempts to resolve it. When Brendan hijacks another truck, and the driver is accidentally killed, Junior orders Brendan's murder. He spares Christopher's life because he is a surrogate nephew of Tony's, ordering a mock execution instead.

Junior has been waiting a long time to become boss and, with his senior rank, feels he is next in line. Upon Jackie Aprile's death, Tony has the support to take over the family but fears Junior will start a war if he is not named boss. Tony resolves the situation by letting Junior become boss in order to steer law enforcement attention away from the rest of the family. With the support of the other captains, Tony runs things behind the scenes, especially as Junior becomes greedier and more abusive of his authority. When Junior finds out about this from Tony's mother, he is furious.

Around this time, Junior's long-time goomah, Bobbi Sanfillipo, inadvertently causes word of Junior's talent for oral sex to spread among the mob wives, eventually reaching Tony, who mocks him in front of several other men. Junior furiously breaks up with Bobbi over this, smashing a lemon meringue pie in her face. He also learns through Livia (Nancy Marchand) that Tony is seeing a psychiatrist. Junior then orders Tony's failed assassination, which, due to his fondness for Tony, upsets him. Junior vomits while discussing details of the hit and is visibly upset when his associates discuss the hit with him. Tony retaliates by having two of Junior's enforcers, Mikey Palmice (Al Sapienza) and Chucky Signore (Sal Ruffino), murdered. Junior is spared only because the FBI arrests him on racketeering charges.

Junior's acting captain, Philly "Spoons" Parisi, comments on the conflict between Tony and his uncle and also Livia's involvement, so Tony has him killed. With Junior and his main supporters either in jail or dead, Tony takes full control of the family. He lets Junior keep the title of boss while Tony runs everything as the street boss. Junior is allowed to run his old crew but must give 95% of the proceeds to Tony. Along with a bigger share from his old high-end poker game, union rackets, and car theft ring, this enables Junior to live on a subsistence level while also making enough to pay his legal fees.

Finally, Tony moves two soldiers from Junior's crew, Patsy Parisi (Dan Grimaldi), the twin brother of Philly, and Gigi Cestone (John Fiore), over to his own crew. This leaves Junior the senile Murf Lupo (Val Bisoglio) as capo, Beppy Scerbo (Joe Pucillo), and Bobby Baccalieri as soldiers.

Soon, Junior is released from jail and placed under house arrest in his Belleville, New Jersey home while awaiting trial, after his attorney convinces the judge that Junior is much sicker than he actually is. While he is under house arrest, Soprano captain Richie Aprile (David Proval) is released from prison after serving ten years, and actively seeks Junior's friendship. Richie actively seeks Junior's support to kill Tony and take over the crime family.

While Junior wants to take back control, he is cautious of Richie's plans. He sends Richie to talk to the acting capo Albert "Ally Boy" Barese, but Richie fails to gain his support. Realising that Richie lacks the necessary support from the rest of the family, Junior decides that he is better off sticking with Tony and subsequently discloses Richie's plot to his nephew. Grateful for the warning, Tony increases Junior's take of his former rackets from 5% to 7.5%, and the two (more or less) bury the hatchet.

During this time, Bobby Baccalieri becomes Junior's replacement, right-hand man, and closest confidant. Bobby accompanies Junior on hospital visits during his battles with stomach cancer, which he eventually overcomes. Junior finds various ways to get around his house arrest—using his doctor's office and lawyer's office to conduct business and attending as many funerals and family functions as possible. Despite their disputes, Tony often seeks Junior's advice as the voice of experience.

In Season Four, Junior's trial ends in a mistrial after they are able to intimidate one of the jurors into voting not guilty and forcing a hung jury. Although Junior has survived cancer and possible prison time, the toll of a series of 'mini-strokes' and the confinement of house arrest has left him confused, depressed, and in failing health. By season five, Junior starts to show signs of dementia, requiring care and support. In "Where's Johnny?", Junior wanders the streets in his bathrobe and slippers, looking for his deceased brother.

In Season Six, Junior's dementia has worsened, as he becomes paranoid that his long-deceased enemy, "Little Pussy" Malanga, is after him. Tony refuses to put his uncle in a nursing home, feeling obligated to care for Junior himself with the aid of his sisters and Bobby. In the season six debut episode, Tony arrives at Junior's house one evening. Junior, believing his nephew to be Malanga, shoots Tony in the abdomen. Frightened, Junior runs upstairs, hiding away in his bedroom closet while Tony struggles to dial 9-1-1 before losing consciousness.

Junior is arrested and taken into federal custody over the shooting, but his lawyer secures him a release into a cushy mental institution, claiming he is currently unfit to stand trial. Junior remains confused and distressed, denying that he could have deliberately shot his own nephew. Junior's dementia has progressed to such an extreme state that when his great-nephew A.J. Soprano (Robert Iler) visits him with the intention of killing him as revenge, Junior thinks A.J. is Tony and greets him with excitement. A.J.'s plan is botched when he inadvertently drops the knife on the floor. Tony pulls some strings with former Assemblyman, now State Senator, Ronald Zellman (Peter Riegert) to get A.J. released without charges being filed.

In the Wyckoff therapeutic center, Junior begins to put his old life back together. He still collects weekly payments from his organizations and is occasionally visited by Pat Blundetto and Beppy Scerbo. Within the confines of the mental home, Junior behaves like a typical Mafia chieftain; bribing orderlies, organizing card games, and even physically abusing a rival. A young patient named Carter Chong looks up to Junior as a mentor and father figure and admires his aggressive, imposing, and rebellious nature.

After Junior loses control of his bladder, the center's administrators conclude that he is not taking his medications. Junior is confronted with the choice of either taking the medication or being moved to a less pleasant facility. Junior agrees to take the medication and begins to become more docile. He is badly beaten by his anger-prone protégé, who doesn't want to lose Junior as a mentor. In the final scene of "Remember When" Junior sits passively, black and blue, with broken glasses from his beating, silently sitting and petting a cat sitting on his lap.

In the episode "The Blue Comet", Janice (Aida Turturro) approaches Tony and tells him that Junior has run out of money, and will be removed from the Wyckoff therapeutic center. She implores Tony to help him out. Tony shows no sympathy for Junior and offers no support, telling Janice that she and Bobby are cut out of his life too, although it is just an empty threat. In the final episode, "Made in America", Junior is moved to a state facility. When Janice goes to visit him, Junior thinks she is her mother, Livia, and thinks that a picture of Janice's daughter is Janice herself.

She tries to tell him that Bobby has been murdered, but Junior does not comprehend, thinking she means Bobby Kennedy. Tony later visits a now sick and wheelchair-using Junior for the first time since the shooting. Junior recognizes him as someone he used to play catch with, remembering playing with Tony 40 years earlier. Tony tries to remind Junior of who he was, and even who his brother was, but Junior cannot remember.

Tony tells him that he and his father used to run North Jersey, to which Junior simply smiles and replies, "Well, that's nice". Tony finally realizes Junior is in an advanced stage of dementia and is saddened and frustrated that Junior is lost for good. Tony simply looks at Junior and then tearfully leaves his uncle for the last time without saying another word.
