= Dominic Chianese =

American actor (born 1931)

- Chianese in 2011
- Born: February 24, 1931 (age 95); New York City, U.S.
- Education: Brooklyn College
- Occupations: Actor; singer; musician
- Years active: 1952–present
- Known for: The Godfather Part II, The Sopranos
- Spouse: Jane Pittson (m. 2003; died 2024)
- Children: 6

Dominic Chianese (/kiːəˈneɪsiː/; kee-ə-NAY-see; born February 24, 1931) is an American actor, singer, and musician. He is best known for his roles as Corrado "Junior" Soprano on the HBO series The Sopranos (1999–2007), Johnny Ola in The Godfather Part II (1974), and Leander Whitlock in Boardwalk Empire (2011–2013).

== Early life ==
Chianese was born and raised on 751 E 182nd St in Belmont, Bronx, a neighborhood and borough of New York City on February 24, 1931. His father was a bricklayer. His paternal grandfather was Italian and left Afragola for New York in 1904. Chianese graduated from the Bronx High School of Science in 1948. He first attended Champlain College in Plattsburgh, New York, but the university was closed due to the start of the Korean War. He later graduated from Brooklyn College in 1961 with a bachelor's degree in speech and theater.

== Career ==
After a decade of attending college and appearing in off-Broadway theater, Chianese attended his first professional acting class at HB Studio in Manhattan with renowned teacher Walt Witcover. His first Broadway show was Oliver! in 1965. He has continued to perform on Broadway, off Broadway, and in regional theater. To supplement income during the periods where he struggled to find roles, he played rhythm guitar and sang in taverns and restaurants while hosting open mic nights at Gerdes Folk City in Greenwich Village.

Chianese's first television role came when George C. Scott recommended him for the series East Side/West Side. In 1974, filmmaker Francis Ford Coppola cast him as Johnny Ola in The Godfather Part II, beginning a film career that would see him appear several times alongside Al Pacino in films such as Dog Day Afternoon (1975), ...And Justice for All (1979), and Looking for Richard (1996). He also co-starred with Pacino onstage. Before being cast in The Godfather Part II, he worked for the Drug Commission of New York as a recreational worker in rehab, where he gave guitar lessons to women who were serving time for drug crimes.

Chianese as Corrado "Junior" Soprano on The Sopranos

Chianese's most prominent acting role was as Corrado "Junior" Soprano on the HBO hit show The Sopranos, where he played a central role in the DiMeo crime family. For the performance, Chianese was nominated for two Emmy Awards for Outstanding Supporting Actor in a Drama Series in 2000 and 2001, respectively.

In terms of singing, Chianese is a tenor. He released an album titled Hits in 2000, featuring him singing American and Italian songs. He performed Salvatore Cardillo's sentimental classic "Core 'ngrato" ("Ungrateful Heart") on the third-season finale of The Sopranos, "Army of One." In 2003, along with AOL Music, he released a second album titled Ungrateful Heart, which features 16 classic Neapolitan songs. In the 2000s, he played in a mandolin quartet every week at the Hotel Edison.

Chianese appeared as a guest actor on the HBO series Boardwalk Empire for three seasons as Leander Whitlock, a retired lawyer and power broker. In December 2018, he and co-author Matthew Sargent published his biography Twelve Angels: The Women Who Taught Me How to Act, Live, and Love.

Most recently, he starred in the short film Breathe Truth (2024), a comedy directed by Thomas Vallely, screenplay by Rebecca Scarpati, about an elderly actor auditioning to perform in a Shakespeare play for the first time.

== Personal life ==
Chianese has two ex-wives and six children. He was married to his third wife Jane Pittson from 2003 until her death in 2024.

In 2010, Chianese received the Ellis Island Medal of Honor in recognition of his humanitarian efforts.

== Filmography ==
=== Film ===
Year	Title	Role	Notes
1972	Fuzz	Panhandler	
1974	The Godfather Part II	Johnny Ola	
1975	Dog Day Afternoon	Mr. Wortzik	
1976	All the President's Men	Eugenio R. Martínez	
1978	Fingers	Arthur Fox	
1978	On the Yard	Mendoza	Uncredited
1979	Firepower	Orlov	
1979	...And Justice for All	Carl Travers	
1981	Fort Apache, the Bronx	Mr. Corelli	
1989	Second Sight	Father Dominic	
1990	Q&A	Larry Pesch / Vito / Lorenzo Franconi	
1991	Out for Justice	Mr. Madano	
1992	The Public Eye	Spoleto	
1993	Rivalen des Glücks – The Contenders	Father of the bride	
1993	The Night We Never Met	Nosy Neighbor	
1996	If Lucy Fell	Al	
1996	Love Is All There Is	Italian Consul	
1996	The Mouse	Al the Trainer	
1996	Looking for Richard	Himself	Documentary
1997	Night Falls on Manhattan	Judge Impelliteri	
1998	Went to Coney Island on a Mission from God... Be Back by Five	Mickey	
1999	Cradle Will Rock	Silvano	
2002	Unfaithful	Frank Wilson	
2004	When Will I Be Loved	Count Tommaso Lupo	
2004	King of the Corner	Stan Marshak	
2007	The Last New Yorker	Lenny Sugarman	
2007	Adrift in Manhattan	Tommaso Pensara	
2011	Mr. Popper's Penguins	Reader	
2013	The Family	Vinnie Caprese	
2017	Active Adults	Bart	
2024	Breathe Truth	Dominic	

=== Television ===
Year	Title	Role	Notes
1964	East Side/West Side	Charley	Episode: "The Street"
1976	Kojak	George Mallick	Episode: "A Hair-Trigger Away"
1980	A Time for Miracles	Promoter	Television movie
1981	Ryan's Hope	Alexei Vartova	40 episodes
1986	Tales from the Darkside	Correlli's father	Episode: "A Choice of Dreams"
1990	The Lost Capone	Gabriel Capone	Television movie
1991	Law & Order	Dan Rubell	Episode: "Sonata for Solo Organ"
1995–1997	Law & Order	Judge Paul Kaylin	2 episodes
1996	Gotti	Joe Armone	Television movie
1997	Cosby	—N/a	Episode: "Lucas Raymondicus"
1999– 2007	The Sopranos	Corrado 'Junior' Soprano	55 episodes Screen Actors Guild Award for Outstanding Performance by an Ensemble in a Drama Series (2000); Nominated—Golden Nymph Award for Outstanding Actor in a Drama Series; Nominated—Primetime Emmy Award for Outstanding Supporting Actor in a Drama Series (2000–01); Nominated—Screen Actors Guild Award for Outstanding Performance by an Ensemble in a Drama Series (2001–03, 2005, 2007)
2004	Hope & Faith	Irv Miller	Episode: "Trade Show"
2004	Crimes of Fashion	George	Television movie
2010	Damages	Stuart Zedeck	7 episodes
2010	Blue Bloods	Jack 'Happy Jack' Vintano	Episode: "Officer Down"
2011	The Secret Life of the American Teenager	Vic	2 episodes
2011–2013	Boardwalk Empire	Leander Cephas Whitlock	12 episodes Screen Actors Guild Award for Outstanding Performance by an Ensemble in a Drama Series (2012)
2012–2015	The Good Wife	Judge Michael Marx	5 episodes
2019	The Village	Enzo	Main cast
2019	Inspector Montalbano	John Zuck	Episode: "Un diario del '43"; Chianese's voice is dubbed by Gianni Giuliano
