= Pine Barrens (The Sopranos) =

- The Sopranos episode
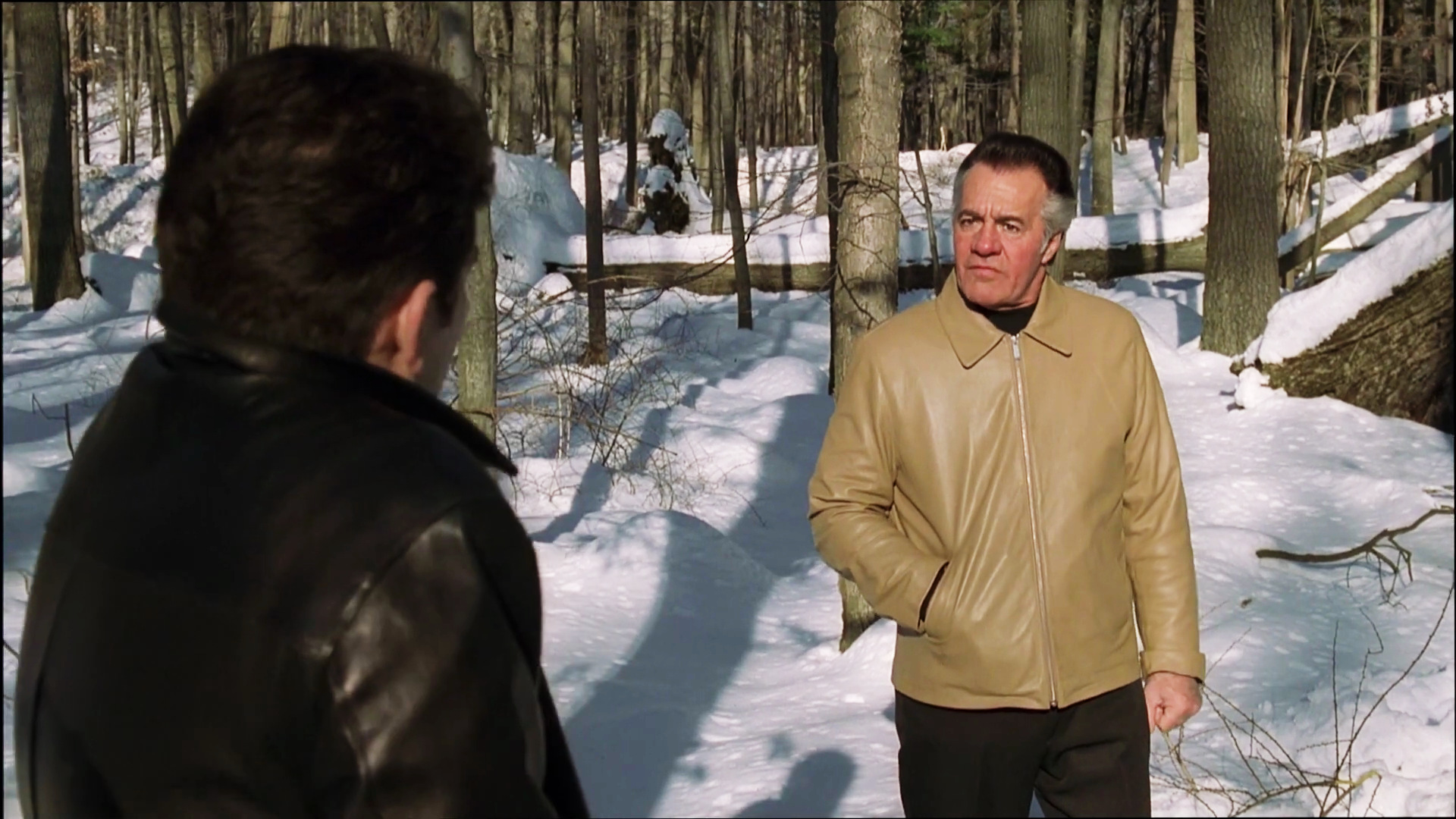
- Christopher Moltisanti and Paulie Gualtieri in the Pine Barrens. While the episode is set in the New Jersey Pine Barrens, it was actually filmed in Harriman State Park
- Episode no.: Season 3 Episode 11
- Directed by: Steve Buscemi
- Story by: Tim Van Patten; Terence Winter
- Teleplay by: Terence Winter
- Cinematography by: Phil Abraham
- Production code: 311
- Original air date: May 6, 2001
- Running time: 60 minutes

Episode chronology
← Previous "...To Save Us All from Satan's Power"	Next → "Amour Fou"
- The Sopranos season 3

"Pine Barrens" is an episode of the HBO series The Sopranos; it is the 11th episode of the show's third season.

"Pine Barrens" revolves around three different storylines, with the main one focusing on Christopher Moltisanti and Paulie Gualtieri's escapades in the New Jersey Pine Barrens after a routine debt payment collection goes spectacularly off the rails, and they turn a straightforward errand into a comical, chaotic and unresolved disaster. The other two main plots focus on infidelity, as Meadow Soprano comes to terms with what Jackie Aprile, Jr. really thinks of her while her father, Tony Soprano, attempts to keep his affair with Gloria Trillo at bay.

Originating from a dream that writer Tim Van Patten had during the production of season 2, "Pine Barrens" went through a difficult production, with the crew being denied a permit to film at their initial planned location of the South Mountain Reservation, as well as encountering additional problems throughout. Actor Steve Buscemi directed the episode, marking the first time he did so for an episode of the series.

First broadcast on May 6, 2001, on HBO, "Pine Barrens" received acclaim from critics and is frequently regarded by critics as one of the greatest episodes in the show's history, as well as one of the greatest episodes in the history of television. It was nominated for three awards at the 53rd Primetime Emmy Awards in November 2001: Primetime Emmy Award for Outstanding Directing for a Drama Series, Primetime Emmy Award for Outstanding Writing for a Drama Series, and Primetime Emmy Award for Outstanding Picture Editing for a Limited or Anthology Series or Movie. Later, in March 2002, Patten, alongside co-writer Terence Winter, won the Writers Guild of America Award for Television: Episodic Drama at the 54th Writers Guild of America Awards.

== Starring ==
- James Gandolfini as Tony Soprano
- Lorraine Bracco as Dr. Jennifer Melfi
- Edie Falco as Carmela Soprano
- Michael Imperioli as Christopher Moltisanti
- Dominic Chianese as Corrado Soprano, Jr.
- Steven Van Zandt as Silvio Dante
- Tony Sirico as Paulie Gualtieri
- Jamie-Lynn Sigler as Meadow Soprano
- Robert Iler as Anthony Soprano, Jr.
- Drea de Matteo as Adriana La Cerva *
- Aida Turturro as Janice Soprano *
- Steven R. Schirripa as Bobby Baccalieri

* = credit only

=== Guest starring ===
- Tom Aldredge as Hugh De Angelis
- Vitali Baganov as Valery
- Jason Cerbone as Jackie Aprile, Jr.
- Oksana Lada as Irina Peltsin
- Annabella Sciorra as Gloria Trillo
- Suzanne Shepherd as Mary De Angelis
- Frank Ciornei as Slava Malevsky
- Deepa Purohit as Ambujam

== Synopsis ==
Following a change in Jackie Jr.'s (Jason Cerbone) behavior, Meadow (Jamie-Lynn Sigler) suspects he is cheating on her. Her suspicions are confirmed when she catches him with another girl. Heartbroken, she tells him they are finished.

Gloria (Annabella Sciorra) and Tony's (James Gandolfini) relationship is growing increasingly unstable, and the two frequently argue, though they always reconcile. Tony tells Dr. Melfi (Lorraine Bracco) that he is seeing Gloria. In the first session, he speaks of how happy they are together. In a second session, he shows alarm toward her volatile personality. Melfi says she cannot divulge information about Gloria as she is "another patient," but alludes to her as a borderline personality, depressive, unstable, and impossible to please, asking Tony if that reminds him of any other woman (heavily implying it is Livia). Tony vaguely shakes his head.

Tony instructs Paulie (Tony Sirico) to make a collection from Valery (Vitali Baganov), a Russian, on behalf of Silvio (Steven Van Zandt), who is ill. He goes with Christopher (Michael Imperioli) to Valery's apartment, where they get the money. However, Paulie provokes Valery and starts a fight, which ends with Valery apparently dead. Panicked, Paulie suggests that they dump him in the New Jersey Pine Barrens.

In the snow-covered woods, Paulie and Chris prepare to dump the body but find that Valery, who is revealed to be a trained commando, is still alive. They give him a shovel and instruct him to dig his own grave. While both are distracted, Valery hits them with the shovel and flees. They chase him, shooting wildly, with Paulie believing that he has hit him. They follow his track, but it ends: Valery has vanished.

After wandering in the woods trying to find their car, Paulie and Chris realize they are lost. Long after nightfall, faint with cold and hunger, they find an abandoned van where they take refuge. They blame each other for what has happened, and the two fight before agreeing to stay together. In the middle of the night, Paulie manages to call Tony despite poor cell service and pleads for help. Tony drives out with Bobby (Steve Schirripa), an amateur outdoorsman. They reach the parking spot, but Paulie's car, containing the money from Valery, has disappeared. They wait until dawn to look for Paulie and Chris and eventually find them.

Paulie gives a false version of what caused the fight with Valery, and Chris backs him up. Tony stresses to Paulie that if Valery ever turns up again, Paulie will have to take care of it. They head back to North Jersey in silence; only Bobby has peace of mind.

== Deceased ==
- A white-tailed deer: Shot by Christopher, who had mistaken it for Valery.
- Possibly Valery

== Title reference ==
The Pine Barrens is a protected wilderness area managed by the New Jersey Pinelands Commission in Southern New Jersey. This is where Christopher and Paulie try to "dispose" of what they assume is Valery's body.

== Cultural references ==
- The "bullshit" movie Christopher alludes to which deals with the Cuban Missile Crisis is Thirteen Days, released a year prior in 2000.
- Paulie likens Valery to Rasputin, a Russian mystic who was notoriously difficult to kill.
- When Paulie is tying on his makeshift shoe, Chris ironically likens him to Bruno Magli, an Italian luxury shoe company.
- When Chris and Paulie are in the van, Chris remarks that Valery is trained and that it is like Die Hard.

== Production ==
The premise for Pine Barrens originated from a dream that show-writer Tim Van Patten had during the production of season 2, wherein Christopher and Paulie get lost in the woods. Patten discussed the concept with fellow writer Terence Winter, who remarked that "If you don’t go into David’s office and tell him this, I am going to steal it and go in myself," leading Patten to pitch it to show-runner David Chase, who agreed to work it into season 3.

The production was initially expected to be "easy", according to episode director Steve Buscemi, but as production unfolded, it ended up being the first episode to take twelve days to shoot.

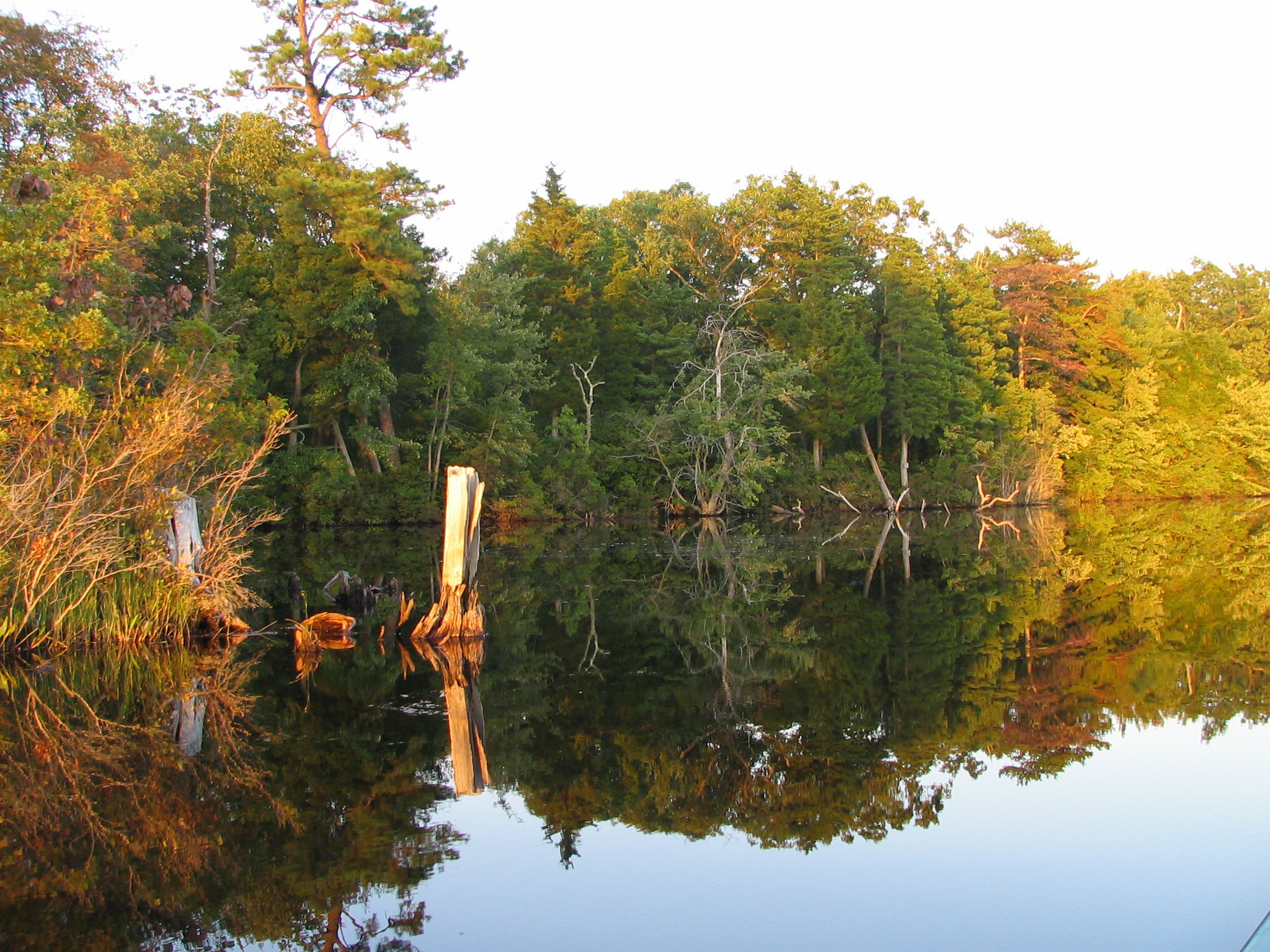
Atsion Lake in the New Jersey Pine Barrens. Despite taking place in the Pine Barrens, the episode was not filmed there.

While the episode's title refers to its setting of the New Jersey Pine Barrens, the episode was not planned to be filmed there, initially being planned to be filmed at the South Mountain Reservation in Essex County, New Jersey. The crew was denied a permit to film there by then Essex County executive James Treffinger, who cited the show's depiction of Italian-Americans as his main reason for doing so. Thus, the crew instead filmed in Harriman State Park in New York, though initially, the spot offered to the crew wasn't seen as suitable; the park did offer an alternative spot, which the crew accepted. During filming, an unexpected snowfall occurred, which, director of photography Phil Abraham recalled that, initially the location was "as brown and barren as it could be" but that after the snowfall, he said that "you could never duplicate it", in regards to the effect it had when shooting the forest scenes. Winter later recalled that the crew was uncertain about what to do during the snowfall. When asked why they decided to do a Christmas episode in the spring, executive producer Ilene S. Landress asserted that there was "no real reason" to make episodes take place in the seasons they aired during, feeling that their viewers were intelligent enough to not get confused.

The location was unusual for the cast, who were used to filming scenes in North Jersey and New York City. Michael Imperioli, in an interview with The Ringer in 2021, stated that, "We mostly lived in that area. So most of the time we’d shoot, go home. But we all went upstate." The conditions made some scenes very difficult to film, in particular, a scene where Paulie rolls down a hill was reported by Winter as being particularly difficult for Tony Sirico to perform, with Sirico expressing his frustration during filming, saying that, "When people tell me they want to be an actor, they should fucking see this. Freezing my balls off, I’m exhausted, I’m about to throw up from running up a hill in the snow four times."

For one of the comedic scenes in which Tony laughs at Bobby's outdoorsman outfit, in order to get James Gandolfini to laugh, the props crew gave Steve Schirripa an assortment of dildos and a dreadlock wig. Schrirripa remarked on the filming of the scene, "If you look, you can see Dominic [Chianese] almost smile, but he doesn’t break character. Of course, I never asked why props had all these dicks lying around." For another comedic scene, where Gloria angrily throws a steak at Tony, Steve Buscemi recalled the difficulty that the crew had when filming this scene, where initially, Gloria's actress, Annabella Sciorra, was meant to throw the steak, but she struggled to hit Gandolfini with her throw. Eventually, Steve Buscemi did it, which Buscemi recalled that James Gandolfini claimed he was "dying to do it".

=== Valery's fate ===
On the fate of Valery, Terence Winter said that it was a question he was commonly asked, and said that they intentionally "wanted to keep it ambiguous" and that "not everything gets answered in life".

David Chase was more dismissive about Valery's fate, saying that he felt there was no need to give the audience closure on it. However, he stated that he knew "where the Russian is" but that he'd never say so because "so many people got so pissy about it".

Nonetheless, in 2008, Chase, in an interview at the Actors Guild, partially revealed Valery's fate as having been found by Boy Scouts who called Slava, his boss, to pick him up. Following his recovery, Valery was sent back to Russia by Slava. Chase repeated this narrative in a 2013 interview with Sam Roberts.

Discussing the episode in a June 10, 2007, New York Times article titled "One Final Whack at That HBO Mob", Imperioli depicted the lack of closure regarding Valery as an example of the series' overall subversiveness, saying, "This show was never what people expected."

In the same article, Sirico said that Chase wrote a sixth-season scene where Christopher and Paulie chanced upon Valery outside a bar and promptly shot him to death, but it was removed from the script, possibly by Chase: "I think David didn't like it. He wanted the audience just to suffer."

== Themes and analysis ==
"Pine Barrens" has been noted to be much more comedic than a typical episode of The Sopranos. The three main plots all showcase different elements of the family's facades. The main plot continues the casual xenophobia and racism showcased throughout the series, as Paulie mocks Valery for his Russian background; however, this mockery is ultimately futile as Valery manages to evade both Christopher and Paulie throughout the episode. Two of the plots focus on infidelity, with one continuing one of the overarching plots of Tony's infidelity, whereas the other makes Meadow realize Jackie Jr's true intentions with her. In one scene, where the young couple plays a game of Scrabble raises attention to Jackie Jr's lack of intellect as a hint of his true intentions with Meadow, but even after catching him cheating with another woman, she does not blame him for this; instead, she blames herself for it. In the other plot, Tony and Gloria's relationship is on the brink of collapse, despite Tony's own claims during a therapy session with Dr. Melfi, discussing a shared session with Carmela, that he is happier with Gloria than he is with Carmela, and that Gloria has made him much happier than therapy or Prozac ever could. The episode's main plot also showcases a uniquely comedic situation where the only competent member of the Soprano crime family is Bobby Baccalieri. Two of the songs featured in the episode, the 1964 rock song "Gloria" by Irish band Them and the Italian Aria "Sposa son disprezzata" help provide hints to the themes of the episode. "Gloria"'s musical instrumentation provides a hint about Gloria's character, while "Sposa son disprezzata" is used to showcase Carmela's psychological state.

In her review of the episode on The A.V. Club, Emily St. James wrote that what tied each plot together was that they all revolved around characters who were metaphorically "lost in the woods" during the season.

== Release ==
"Pine Barrens" was first broadcast on HBO on May 6, 2001, on the show's usual primetime slot of 9 p.m. Eastern Standard Time. It was watched by 8.79 million viewers during its original airing. 5.3% of all households in America viewed the episode during its initial airing, which, despite the greater audience numbers, was actually a decrease of 0.2% from the previous episode, "To Save Us All from Satan's Power", which received a rating of 5.5%.

"Pine Barrens" was first released on home video in the United States on August 27, 2002, in The Complete Third Season VHS and DVD boxset, where it was featured on the fourth disk. It also received a commentary track by episode director Steve Buscemi, making it one of three season 3 episodes to receive commentary tracks, alongside "The Telltale Moozadell" and "Amour Fou". It was later featured as part of The Complete Series DVD boxset in 2008 and then again as part of the same boxset on Blu-ray in 2014.

== Music ==
- The song played during the opening scene, where Gloria arrives at the docks, is Van Morrison's "Gloria" by Them. Tony sang this song to Gloria in "The Telltale Moozadell".
- The music video A.J. is watching on the living room television is "Coffee & TV" by Blur. The song contains lyrics that foreshadow the events that occur in the episode.
- The song played during the final montage/closing credits is the aria "Sposa son disprezzata" ("I am wife and I am scorned") from the opera La Merope by Geminiano Giacomelli, sung by Cecilia Bartoli. This is the same music that opens the next episode, "Amour Fou".

== Critical reception and legacy ==
"Pine Barrens" is commonly regarded by critics as one of the greatest episodes in the show's history, and it has also frequently been ranked in publication listings of the greatest episodes in television history.

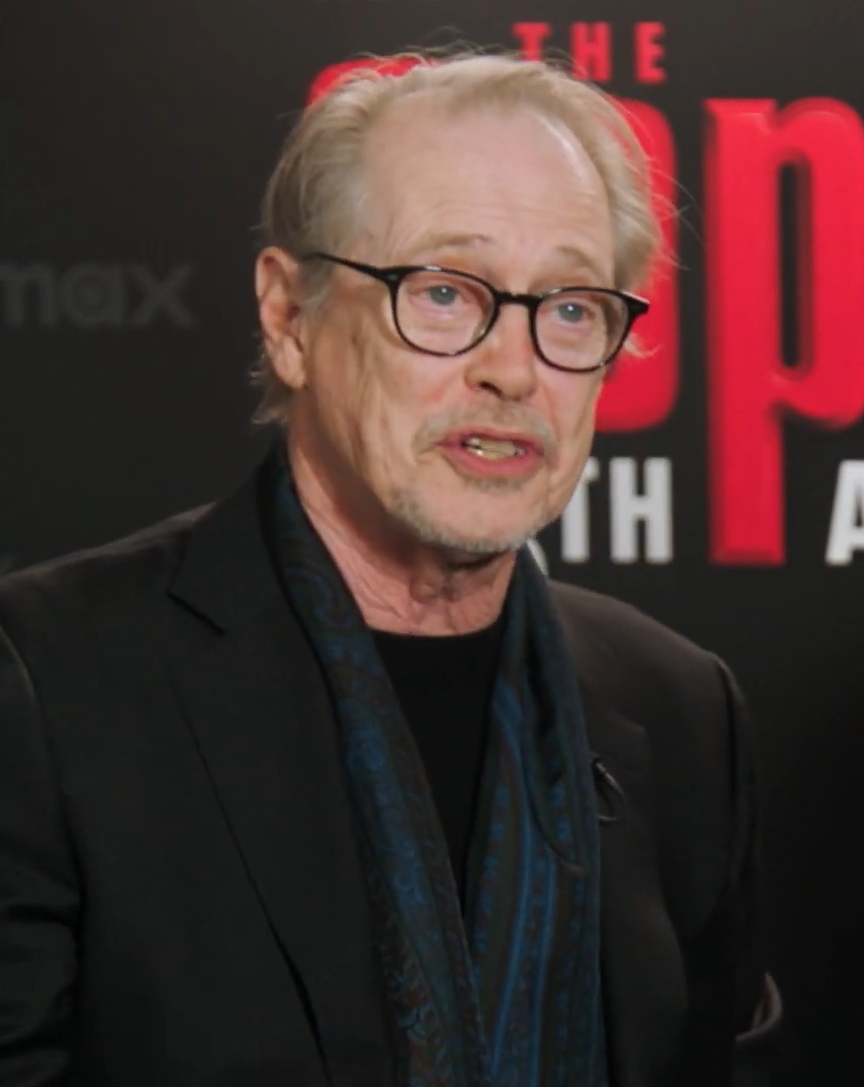
Steve Buscemi (pictured here in 2024) was nominated for the Primetime Emmy Award for Outstanding Directing for a Drama Series for his work on Pine Barrens.

Newsweek's Devin Gordon praised it as the highlight episode of the season, feeling it exemplified a common theme of the series that bad choices don't always "come back to haunt" the characters. Emily St. James, writing for The A.V. Club, noted that while the episode's plot could've been attempted before, it would've been very difficult to do so. She compared the episode to the Breaking Bad episode "Fly" but noted that while the two share similarities, "Fly" focuses entirely on its two leads, whereas "Pine Barrens" does not. James also praised the scene where Meadow catches Jackie Jr cheating on her, but questioned why it took so long for Meadow to realize Jackie Jr's true intentions. Winston Cook-Wilson, writing for Inverse, praised the main plot of the episode, labelling it a "comedy of errors", while also noting that the episode was a microcosm of what made The Sopranos such an unorthodox show.

It was ranked 5th in The Ringer's ranking of "The 100 Best Episodes of the Century", where Andrew Gruttadaro noted that Vitali Baganov's performance as Valery and success in evading death at the hands of Christopher and Paulie were the best parts of the episode.

James Poniewozik, writing for Time, ranked the episode as the second-best episode of the show's run. Poniewozik noted that the episode was "the most un-Sopranos-like of Sopranos episodes" due to its self-contained main story.

Josh Wolk, writing for Entertainment Weekly, ranked the episode as the fourth-best episode of the show's run. Wolk praised the comedic elements of the episode, remarking that the main plot was a "comic high point".

"Pine Barrens" was nominated for three awards at the 53rd Primetime Emmy Awards in November 2001: Primetime Emmy Award for Outstanding Directing for a Drama Series (Steve Buscemi), Primetime Emmy Award for Outstanding Writing for a Drama Series (Tim Van Patten and Terrance Winter) and Primetime Emmy Award for Outstanding Picture Editing for a Limited or Anthology Series or Movie (Conrad Gonzalez). Later, in March 2002, Patten and Winter won the Writers Guild of America Award for Television: Episodic Drama at the 54th Writers Guild of America Awards for their work on "Pine Barrens".

The screenplay for "Pine Barrens" was released to the public in 2002, alongside the screenplays for "The Sopranos", "College", "The Happy Wanderer", and "The Knight in White Satin Armor".

== See also ==
- List of television episodes listed among the best
