= List of television episodes listed among the best =

This is a list of television episodes that television critics or magazines have considered among the best of all time. The episodes are included on at least two separate best-of lists from different publications (inclusive of all time periods, networks and genres), as chosen by their editorial staff.

== List ==
Television episode	Television show	Release	Network	Ref.
"Abyssinia, Henry"	M*A*S*H	1975	CBS	
"Atomic Shakespeare"	Moonlighting	1986	ABC	
"Chuckles Bites the Dust"	The Mary Tyler Moore Show	1975	CBS	
"The City on the Edge of Forever"	Star Trek: The Original Series	1967	NBC	
"Clyde Bruckman's Final Repose"	The X-Files	1995	Fox	
"College"	The Sopranos	1999	HBO	
"Connor's Wedding"	Succession	2023	HBO	
"The Constant"	Lost	2008	ABC	
"The Contest"	Seinfeld	1992	NBC	
"Episode 1"	Fleabag	2019	BBC	
"Everyone's Waiting"	Six Feet Under	2005	HBO	
"Final Grades"	The Wire	2006	HBO	
"Flip"	The Larry Sanders Show	1998	HBO	
"Forks"	The Bear	2023	Hulu	
"Ham Radio"	Frasier	1997	NBC	
"Last Exit to Springfield"	The Simpsons	1993	Fox	
"Long, Long Time"	The Last of Us	2023	HBO	
"Love's Labor Lost"	ER	1995	NBC	
"The Monsters Are Due on Maple Street"	The Twilight Zone	1960	CBS	
"Opie the Birdman"	The Andy Griffith Show	1963	CBS	
"Ozymandias"	Breaking Bad	2013	AMC	
"Pilot" (also known as "Northwest Passage")	Twin Peaks	1990	ABC	
"Pine Barrens"	The Sopranos	2001	HBO	
"Reverend Jim: A Space Odyssey"	Taxi	1979	ABC	
"Scott Tenorman Must Die"	South Park	2001	Comedy Central	
"Showdown, Part 2"	Cheers	1983	NBC	
"The Ski Lodge"	Frasier	1998	NBC	
"Slap Bet"	How I Met Your Mother	2006	CBS	
"The Suitcase"	Mad Men	2010	AMC	
"Teddy Perkins"	Atlanta	2018	FX	
"Time Heals"	St. Elsewhere	1986	NBC	
"Two Cathedrals"	The West Wing	2001	NBC	

== Publications ==
The reference numbers in the notes section show which of the four selected publications list the television episode.

- The Independent – 2025
- Rolling Stone – 2024
- Screen Rant – 2025
- TV Guide – 1997, 2009

== See also ==
- List of television shows listed among the best
- List of most-watched television broadcasts
