= Episode 1 (Fleabag series 2) =

- Fleabag episode
- Episode no.: Series 2 Episode 1
- Directed by: Harry Bradbeer
- Written by: Phoebe Waller-Bridge
- Editing by: Gary Dollner
- Original air date: March 4, 2019
- Running time: 26 minutes

Guest appearance
- Maddie Rice as Needy Waitress

Episode chronology
← Previous "Episode 6"	Next → "Episode 2"

"Episode 1" is the first episode of the second series of Fleabag, and the seventh overall. The episode was written by Phoebe Waller-Bridge and directed by Harry Bradbeer. It premiered on BBC One on 4 March 2019 in the United Kingdom. In the United States, it premiered on Amazon Prime Video on 17 May 2019, along with the rest of the series.

The episode takes place during an engagement dinner for Fleabag's dad and godmother, picking up one year after the finale of series one. Fleabag is introduced to the Priest who will officiate the wedding. After her sister, Claire, has a miscarriage in the restaurant bathroom, Fleabag tells the dinner guests that the miscarriage was her own in an attempt to help conceal it. She hits Claire's husband in the face and gets a bloody nose after he shoves her.

The episode was hailed by critics as a "cinematic comedy masterpiece" and received three 2019 Primetime Emmy Awards, for Outstanding Directing for a Comedy Series, Outstanding Writing for a Comedy Series, and Outstanding Lead Actress in a Comedy Series. It is widely regarded as one of the greatest television episodes of all time.

== Plot ==
The episode begins in medias res, with Fleabag (Phoebe Waller-Bridge) in a restroom cleaning blood from her nose. She breaks the fourth wall to state, "This is a love story." There is an interstitial scene where Fleabag explains steps she has taken to get her life together in the year since the end of series one. She is then shown at a restaurant with her family, including her sister, Claire (Sian Clifford), to whom she has not spoken for a year. Her father (Bill Paterson) and her godmother (Olivia Colman) are hosting a dinner to celebrate their engagement. The Priest (Andrew Scott), who will officiate their wedding, is also in attendance. Claire and her husband, Martin (Brett Gelman), announce that they are trying to get pregnant, and that they are no longer drinking because Martin is a recovering alcoholic.

When Fleabag goes outside to smoke a cigarette, the Priest tries to speak to her, but she silently walks away mid-sentence. He insults her as she goes, to which Fleabag responds with silent delight.

Fleabag's godmother, who is an artist, tells the table that her gift to Fleabag's father is a portrait of Fleabag and Claire, for which they will need to sit for together.

While Fleabag is outside smoking another cigarette, her father comes out to speak to her. He hands her an envelope as a belated birthday gift, which she doesn't open. Upon walking into the restaurant, Fleabag catches Martin drinking alcohol away from the table.

At the table, Claire discusses her new position in Finland at her company, where she works in finance with lawyers. Her family reacts with surprise, as they all believed her to be a lawyer herself. Agitated, Claire confronts Fleabag about her passivity at the dinner and tells her to open the gift from their father. Fleabag reads aloud that it is a gift certificate for a therapy session.

After a tense moment between Fleabag and Claire, Claire excuses herself from the table. Fleabag goes into the bathroom to find her, where it is revealed that Claire is suffering a miscarriage. Fleabag insists that they must go to the hospital, to which Claire reluctantly agrees. They make a plan to excuse themselves from the dinner, but after sitting back down, Claire refuses to leave the table. When the other dinner guests ask what's wrong, Fleabag clumsily implies that she was the one to have miscarried in the bathroom. She and Claire have a veiled argument about Claire's refusal to acknowledge what has happened, and Fleabag readies herself to leave in frustration until a drunken Martin begins to taunt Fleabag about the miscarriage. In response to Martin's comments, Fleabag punches him in the nose. As she bends to punch him again, he shoves her face away, pushing her into the Priest, who also gets hit in the face. As the waitress (Maddie Rice) approaches to help, Martin accidentally elbows her in the nose.

Fleabag is now in the bathroom, cleaning her bloodied nose in the same position as the opening scene. The Priest knocks on the door to ask if she needs help, which she declines. She offers a clean towel to the injured waitress, who is sitting on the floor. As Fleabag is leaving the restaurant, the Priest stops to help her, telling her that he is always available to talk.

As Fleabag is walking home, Claire calls to her from a nearby cab which Fleabag gets inside. Fleabag directs the taxi to the nearest hospital. After a brief awkward silence, Claire and Fleabag reconcile by agreeing that the Priest is "hot."

== Cast ==
- Phoebe Waller-Bridge as Fleabag
- Sian Clifford as Claire
- Andrew Scott as the Priest
- Bill Paterson as Dad
- Olivia Colman as the Fleabag's godmother
- Brett Gelman as Martin

=== Guest stars ===
- Maddie Rice as Needy Waitress

== Production ==
Waller-Bridge, who is the sole series writer, intended to have an episode set in a restaurant because the single setting felt theatrical. Initially meant to be episode three, Waller-Bridge cut those episodes and instead made "Episode 1" the premiere.

Bradbeer, with whom Waller-Bridge consulted closely on the show's writing, decided to keep the camera in one spot during the dinner table scenes. "Episode 1" was edited by series editor Gary Dollner. The three experimented with removing Waller-Bridge's direct addresses to the camera but decided that this element was needed.

=== Broadcast ===
The episode first aired on 4 March 2019 in the United Kingdom on BBC One. Every episode in series 2 was released on 17 May 2019 in the United States on Amazon Prime Video.

== Reception ==
"Episode 1" received critical acclaim. Reviewer Danette Chavez wrote for The A.V. Club, "The premiere is an early frontrunner for best episode of the season, if not the series, returning to Fleabag’s theatrical roots for an evening of farce and concentrated viciousness. With the help of series director Harry Bradbeer, Waller-Bridge stages a dinner party for the ages, one that's both a comedy of manners and the introductory chapter to a love story." In 2024, Rolling Stone listed it as the 24th best TV episode of all time.

For the episode, Waller-Bridge received a Primetime Emmy Award for Outstanding Writing for a Comedy Series and Outstanding Lead Actress in a Comedy Series, and Bradbeer received a Primetime Emmy for Outstanding Directing for a Comedy Series at the 71st Primetime Emmys.

At the Creative Primetime Emmy Awards, the episode's editor, Gary Dollner received a Creative Primetime Emmy for Outstanding Single-Camera Picture Editing for a Comedy Series, and the cinematographer, Tony Miller, received a nomination for the Outstanding Cinematography for a Single-Camera Series (Half-Hour).

== See also ==
- List of television episodes listed among the best
