= To Save Us All from Satan's Power =

- The Sopranos episode
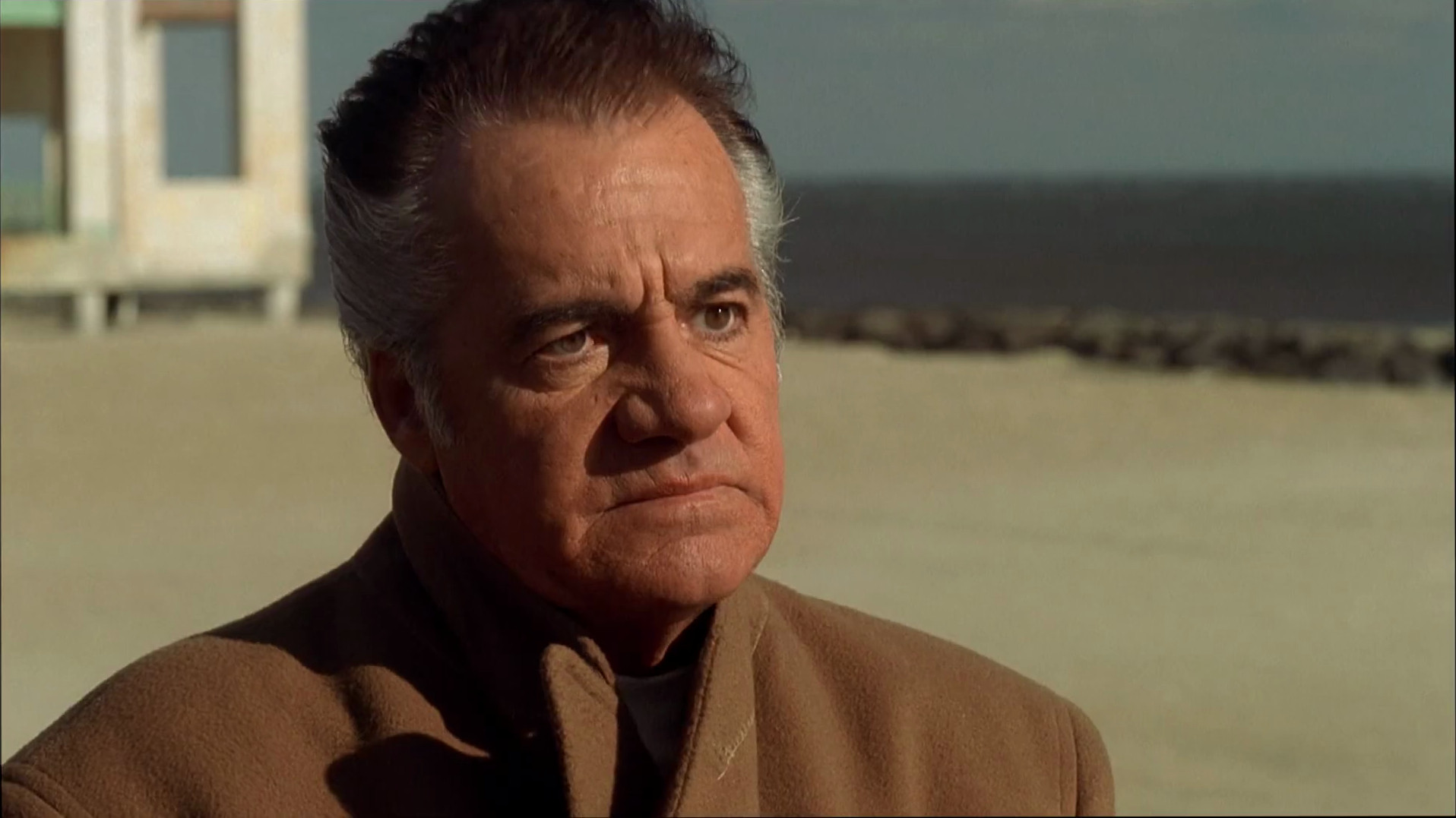
- Paulie Gualtieri on the Asbury Park boardwalk
- Episode no.: Season 3 Episode 10
- Directed by: Jack Bender
- Written by: Robin Green; Mitchell Burgess
- Cinematography by: Alik Sakharov
- Production code: 310
- Original air date: April 29, 2001
- Running time: 45 minutes

Episode chronology
← Previous "The Telltale Moozadell"	Next → "Pine Barrens"
- The Sopranos season 3

"To Save Us All from Satan's Power" is the 36th episode of the HBO original series The Sopranos and the 10th of the show's third season. It was written by Robin Green and Mitchell Burgess and directed by Jack Bender. The episode originally aired on April 29, 2001.

== Starring ==
- James Gandolfini as Tony Soprano
- Lorraine Bracco as Dr. Jennifer Melfi
- Edie Falco as Carmela Soprano
- Michael Imperioli as Christopher Moltisanti
- Dominic Chianese as Corrado Soprano, Jr.
- Steven Van Zandt as Silvio Dante
- Tony Sirico as Paulie Gualtieri
- Jamie-Lynn Sigler as Meadow Soprano
- Robert Iler as Anthony Soprano, Jr.
- Drea de Matteo as Adriana La Cerva *
- Aida Turturro as Janice Soprano
- John Ventimiglia as Artie Bucco
- Kathrine Narducci as Charmaine Bucco
- Steven R. Schirripa as Bobby Baccalieri
- Federico Castelluccio as Furio Giunta
- Robert Funaro as Eugene Pontecorvo

* = credit only

=== Guest-starring ===
- Jerry Adler as Hesh Rabkin

==== Also guest-starring ====
- Vitali Baganov as Valery
- Joe Badalucco as Jimmy Altieri (flashback sequences)
- Jason Cerbone as Jackie Aprile, Jr.
- Matthew Cerbone as Young Jackie Aprile, Jr. (flashback sequences)
- Andrew Davoli as Dino Zerilli
- John Fiore as Gigi Cestone (flashback sequences)
- Dan Grimaldi as Patsy Parisi
- George Loros as Ray Curto
- Vincent Pastore as Salvatore "Big Pussy" Bonpensiero (flashback sequences)
- Turk Pipkin as Aaron Arkaway
- Michael Rispoli as Jackie Aprile, Sr (flashback sequences)
- Alik Sakharov as Agron
- Maureen Van Zandt as Gabriella Dante
- Joe Pucillo as Beppy Scerbo (flashback sequences)
- Frank Ciornei as Slava Malevsky

== Synopsis ==
Tony is on the Asbury Park boardwalk, where he is going to meet Paulie. While waiting, he remembers another meeting there five years ago, in 1995, with Pussy and Jackie Aprile, Sr. At the time there was a dispute between Jackie and Junior, and Pussy had been in Boca Raton, Florida arranging a sitdown. However, Pussy did not go to the sitdown, and Tony thinks that was when the FBI flipped him; he believes they had him wear a wire when he dressed up as Santa. Now they need a new Santa and Bobby is compelled to play the part. He is shy, unhappy, and gauche.

When Tony is visiting Janice she starts complaining about a pain in her wrist, which might need an operation, caused by the Russian thug who came to take back Svetlana's prosthetic leg. Tony obtains his name and place of work, and he and Furio beat him up and throw him through the glass window of a store's Christmas display. Though badly shaken at first when she sees on TV what Tony has done, Janice is also grateful, and immediately wants incorporate the theme of brotherhood into a song she is writing with her boyfriend.

Charmaine, newly separated from Artie, looks glamorous at Nuovo Vesuvio. Tony compliments her, but she responds by blaming him for changes in Artie's character. He angrily walks out, along with Christopher and Silvio. They go to a strip club. Jackie Jr. is there, getting a lap dance. Enraged, Tony takes him to the bathroom and beats him up. He confiscates the gun Ralphie gave him, and knees him in the groin, leaving him on the floor.

On Christmas morning, the Sopranos are opening their gifts when Jackie arrives with presents from his mother, and his own present for Meadow, an engraved necklace that reads "I will always be true". She ostentatiously embraces and kisses him, while he glances at Tony. Alone with Tony, Jackie tells him he has flunked out of Rutgers but believes he can be serious and successful in men's fashion. He keeps apologizing, but Tony says, "I haven't decided what to do with you." After Jackie leaves, Meadow gives Tony her present, a Big Mouth Billy Bass. As his family laughs in amusement, he forces a smile and laughs.

== Title reference ==
- The episode's title is taken from a verse of the Christmas carol "God Rest Ye Merry, Gentlemen".

== Cultural references ==
- Tony switches on the television. Seeing It's a Wonderful Life is on, he looks upset and says "Ah Jesus. Enough already."
- Pussy mentions that he flew with '90s budget airline ValuJet.
- Christopher states that there is significant money in the Grinch, and references the choice to cast Jim Carrey as the Grinch.
- The OJ Simpson trial is shown throughout the 1995 flashback scenes.
- The Russians mention that Russian Christmas doesn't occur until January. He also mentions IBM ThinkPads.
- Janice is taking Percodan (oxycodone/aspirin) for her wrist injury.

== References to prior episodes ==
- The Big Mouth Billy Bass, including the song "Take Me to the River", was previously featured in the episode "Second Opinion".
- The Asbury Park boardwalk in winter, along with the view of the sea closing the episode, was previously featured in "Funhouse".

== Production ==
- Recurring series cinematographer Alik Sakharov makes a cameo appearance as Agron, accountant of the Russian money laundering business.

== Music ==
- The song played over the end credits is "I've Got a Feeling" by the American Sacred Steel gospel group, The Campbell Brothers with Katie Jackson.
- During the 1995 Christmas flashback at Satriale's, the jukebox was playing "The Chipmunk Song (Christmas Don't Be Late)", by The Chipmunks.
- The rendition of "God Rest Ye Merry, Gentlemen" playing while Carmela enjoys the Christmas tree was performed by the Choir of Tewkesbury Abbey School.
- The song Silvio has turned off in the Bada Bing dream sequence is "The Cycle" from Virgos Merlot's Signs of a Vacant Soul album.
- "Funky Drummer Boy", a remixed version of "The Little Drummer Boy" from Thornetta Davis plays at the rival strip club where Tony beats up Jackie Jr.
- The song playing while Bobby Baccalà is playing Santa is "Santa Baby" by Eartha Kitt.
- The song playing while Tony, Silvio, and Paulie are eating in Vesuvio is "White Christmas" by The Drifters.
