= Vitali Baganov =

Russian and American actor

- Born: Vitali Viktorovich Baganov; September 6, 1952 (age 74); Leningrad, RSFSR, USSR
- Citizenship: Russian; American
- Education: Leningrad State University; Leningrad State Institute for Theatre, Music and Cinematography
- Occupation: Actor
- Years active: 1979–present
- Known for: Grand Theft Auto IV

Vitali Viktorovich Baganov (Russian: Виталий Викторович Баганов; born September 6, 1952) is a Russian and American actor of film and television who guest starred as Valery the Russian gangster in The Sopranos episodes "Pine Barrens" and "...To Save Us All from Satan's Power". Baganov also voiced Ray Bulgarin in Grand Theft Auto IV and The Ballad of Gay Tony.

== Biography ==
Vitali Baganov was born in Leningrad, Russian RSFSR, Soviet Union (now Saint Petersburg, Russia).

Baganov studied astronomy in Leningrad State University then transferred to the Leningrad State Institute for Theatre, Music and Cinematography. After graduation, he worked at Memorial Lenin Komsomol Theatre and Komissarjevsky Theatre. He was filmed in a number of Soviet films. In 1991, he emigrated to the United States.

Along with The Sopranos Baganov has appeared in the US television series Louie and The Americans.

== Filmography ==
- 1979 Sherlock Holmes and Doctor Watson: The Bloody Inscription as himself credited as (V. Baganaov)
- 1979 Inzhener Graffito as himself
- 1984 Sneg v iyule as Sergey Zherdin
- 1984 Doronga k sebe as Lyoahka
- 1984 Nebyvalshchina as Soldier
- 1986 Na ostriya Mecha as himself
- 1988 Shchenok as himself
- 1989 V znak protesta as himself
- 2001 The Sopranos as Valery
- 2008 Grand Theft Auto IV as Ray Bulgarin
- 2009 Grand Theft Auto: The Ballad of Gay Tony as Ray Bulgarin
- 2010 Salt as new Russian president
- 2018 The Americans (2018) as Stepan
