= Connor's Wedding =

- Succession episode
- Episode no.: Season 4 Episode 3
- Directed by: Mark Mylod
- Written by: Jesse Armstrong
- Cinematography by: Patrick Capone
- Original air date: April 9, 2023
- Running time: 62 minutes

Guest appearances
- Zoë Winters as Kerry Castellabate; Scott Nicholson as Colin Stiles; Juliana Canfield (voice) as Jess Jordan; Cynthia Mace as Sylvia; Jamie Chung as Beth; Larry Pine as Sandy Furness; Nadia Brown as Olivia

Episode chronology
← Previous "Rehearsal"	Next → "Honeymoon States"
- Succession season 4

"Connor's Wedding" is the third episode of the fourth season of the American satirical comedy-drama television series Succession, and the 32nd episode overall. It was written by series creator Jesse Armstrong, directed by Mark Mylod, and originally aired on HBO on April 9, 2023.

Succession centers on the Roy family, the owners of global media and entertainment conglomerate Waystar RoyCo, and their fight for control of the company amidst uncertainty about the health of the family's patriarch Logan (Brian Cox). The episode takes place during the wedding of Logan's eldest child Connor (Alan Ruck) as things take a turn after Logan collapses while aboard a private jet. The episode does not depict Logan's illness or collapse, and is mostly told through the perspective of Logan's four children at the wedding as they gradually come to terms with the fact that their father is likely dead.

"Connor's Wedding" received unanimous critical acclaim, with many calling it the best episode of the series, as well as one of the greatest television episodes of all time, with praise going to the writing, direction, and performances. In particular, the decision to kill off Logan early in the season, as well as depict his demise mostly off-screen to focus on the other characters' reactions to it, was applauded. Out of the twenty-seven Primetime Emmy Award nominations received by Succession for its fourth and final season, five were specifically for the episode, which won Outstanding Writing for a Drama Series for Armstrong (giving him one win for each season) and Outstanding Directing for a Drama Series for Mylod.

== Plot ==
En route to Connor's wedding, Roman receives a call from Logan, who—despite having told Connor he would attend the wedding—is about to board a plane with most of Waystar's management (except Gerri and Hugo) to meet with Matsson. Logan tells Roman to fire Gerri for mishandling the cruises scandal. (Note: The consequences of the scandal were referenced in "Too Much Birthday" and "Chiantishire".) While boarding the plane, Logan tells Tom that Cyd will also be fired. On arrival at the wedding yacht, Roman reluctantly gives Gerri the news. She responds with muted anger, believing that Roman's unwanted sexual advances towards her are responsible for her dismissal. Roman calls Logan and leaves an angry, expletive-laden voicemail expressing his frustration with Logan for manipulating him. Kendall and Shiv arrive on the yacht; Shiv, who is ignoring Tom's phone calls, is tasked by Kendall and Roman with telling Connor that Logan will not be attending the wedding.

While Shiv is away, Roman gets a call from Tom revealing that Logan has suddenly become gravely ill and is receiving CPR on the plane. Tom places his phone by Logan's ear to give the panicking Kendall and Roman a chance to say goodbye to their dying father. Kendall goes to find Shiv, and when he returns with her, Roman tells the two that Logan's heart has stopped and he is not breathing. Shiv immediately breaks down crying, but Roman tells her to speak to Logan in case he can still hear her. When asked for his honest opinion, Frank privately tells Kendall over the phone that he believes Logan has died. Meanwhile, senior executives on the plane plan a timeline for releasing the news of Logan's death, knowing that the news will impact the market significantly. Tom privately calls Greg to relay the news, and orders him to discreetly delete certain files on his computer and stick close to Cyd. Tom stresses to Greg the importance of keeping the news secret until the markets close, but asks him to make it known that Tom was by Logan's side when he died. He admits to Greg that he is "not okay" and cries after hanging up.

As the realization that their father is dead begins to sink in, the siblings go to inform Connor, who is emotionally numb to the news and says he believes Logan never even liked him. Connor goes to see Willa to discuss calling off the wedding. He questions whether Willa is only marrying him for the money; she admits this is a large reason, but insists she cares for him deeply. Hugo and Gerri are briefed on the situation, and Hugo informs the grieving siblings that a statement on Logan's passing is being drafted by Karolina, but the siblings cannot agree on whether this is a good idea. Kendall asserts that their next actions must be unimpeachable, as whatever they do will form part of a historic narrative, and that their "freedom of movement" must be preserved. The siblings decide they will issue a statement themselves ahead of the board meeting the next day, during which the future of the company's leadership will be decided.

Connor and Willa ultimately decide to continue with the wedding in front of just a handful of guests. The other siblings leave the boat and are flown out to Teterboro Airport, where the plane lands and Logan is pronounced dead on arrival. Press reporters swarm, and Shiv reads them the siblings' statement on Logan's death and adds that she and her brothers plan to "be there" as the company moves forward. Roman sees that Waystar's stock price has already plummeted, and the siblings share an emotional hug. Shiv leaves with Tom while Roman goes to bid farewell to Logan; Kendall watches from afar, fighting back tears, as paramedics load Logan's body into an ambulance.

== Production ==
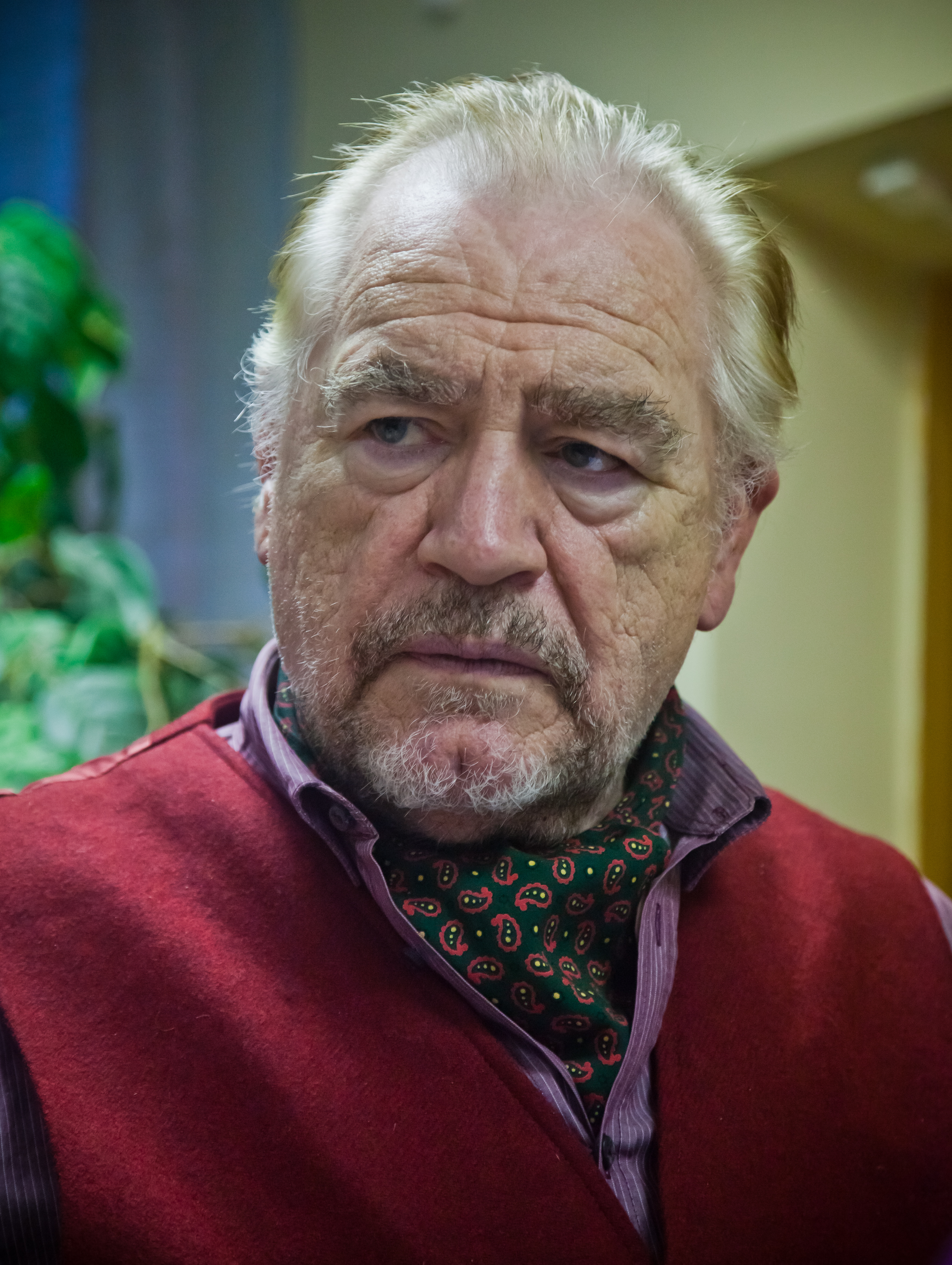
Brian Cox, whose character Logan Roy dies in the episode.

"Connor's Wedding" was written by Succession creator and showrunner Jesse Armstrong and directed by Mark Mylod in his fourteenth episode for the series.

=== Writing ===
"Connor's Wedding" features the death of Logan Roy, an event alluded to since the beginning of the series; Armstrong felt there was a "promise in the title" of the series that Logan's life as character was finite, and that someone would have to succeed him. Armstrong initially planned to kill off the character in the first season itself, before reversing course and writing the rest of the series around the drama between Logan and his children.

Regarding killing off Logan early in the final season, Armstrong first raised the idea to Mylod as early as pre-production for the third season. Armstrong was keen not to place Logan's death at the end of the season, stressing the importance of depicting "how the death of someone significant rebounds around a family". Mylod felt that placing Logan's death at an unexpected point in the season created "great drama out of mundanity - you know, the inconvenience of it all." Armstrong was furthermore intent on portraying Logan's death off-screen, intending to "capture a feeling of death that people experience in the modern era, of separation of communication over phone and email". He elaborated that "people can be a bit adrift if you are in a different physical space from the drama of whatever is unfolding."

Actor Brian Cox was pleased with Armstrong's decision to kill off Logan—and end the series—after four seasons, stating, "the problem with a lot of television, particularly American television, is it goes past its sell-by date." Cox was informed of his character's death by Armstrong prior to the start of production on the fourth season; Armstrong admitted to feeling regret over "the slightly personal feeling of [Cox] not being there all through the journey." Cox himself echoed these sentiments in a later interview, remarking, "I was fine with it ultimately, but I did feel a little bit rejected. (...) I felt a little bit like all the work I’ve done and finally I’m going to, you know, end up as an ear on a carpet of a plane." Mylod revealed that the series filmed "dummy" scenes with Cox in later episodes as a misdirection in order to maintain secrecy about Logan's death.

=== Filming ===
The majority of the episode was filmed onboard a yacht overlooking New York Harbor; Mylod and Armstrong wanted the episode to be set in an area where it would be difficult for the characters to communicate, and Mylod felt the boat and its location were symbolic of the characters' emotional circumstances. He stated: "On the one hand, you have all the freedom of the water and the harbor and the great adventure of New York City out beyond. But at the same time, these characters are trapped in this little glass cage, in this VIP room, trapped in their grief and in their frustration of not being able to get the knowledge or comfort they seek. That, to me, was the perfect visual juxtaposition."

For the sequence of the siblings learning of Logan's death—a 28-page scene in the script—a 30-minute long take was filmed, though it was not presented that way in the finished episode. Since the series is shot on 35 mm film, a format with reels that only last 10 minutes, an "extraordinary ballet between the cast and the camera crew" had to be performed in order to accomplish the unbroken take. According to Mylod, camera operators concealed camera magazines across the set, and kept a third camera body behind a door, to ensure that at least one camera was always running and the other camera was running to be quickly re-loaded. The actors were given considerable freedom and little stage direction while performing the sequence; for the scene where Kendall looks for Shiv, Jeremy Strong was not told where to find his co-star Sarah Snook, and remained in character while genuinely searching for her amidst the crowd of extras.

For the scenes aboard Logan's private company jet, Matthew Macfadyen called in from his home in London to perform Tom's lines to the siblings over the phone, while his scenes as Tom inside the plane were filmed on a soundstage. Mylod considered preserving the entire long take of the siblings aboard the yacht without cutting to the plane, but found Macfadyen's performance "so damn compelling" that he decided to intercut between the yacht and the plane for the final edit. For the shot depicting an unconscious Logan receiving chest compressions, a stunt double was used, with Cox's head digitally composited over the shot in post-production. Mylod was hesitant to show Logan's corpse on camera, which he felt "cheap" and "tasteless", but ultimately decided that the "cruelest" and most fitting way to visually confirm Logan's death would be to juxtapose the shot with the "cozy fireside chat" of Shiv begging her father over the phone not to die. The hug between the siblings at the end of the episode was unscripted.

Actress Jamie Chung makes a brief cameo in the episode as Beth, Connor's wedding planner; she admitted later on in an interview that she took the role to keep her health insurance.

== Reception ==
=== Ratings ===
Across all platforms, the episode was watched by 2.5 million viewers upon airing, making it the series' most-watched episode at the time, until the following week's "Honeymoon States" took over with 2.6 million viewers. The title was previously held by the season four premiere, "The Munsters". On linear television, the episode was watched by 0.609 million viewers, with an 18-49 rating of 0.13.

=== Critical reception ===
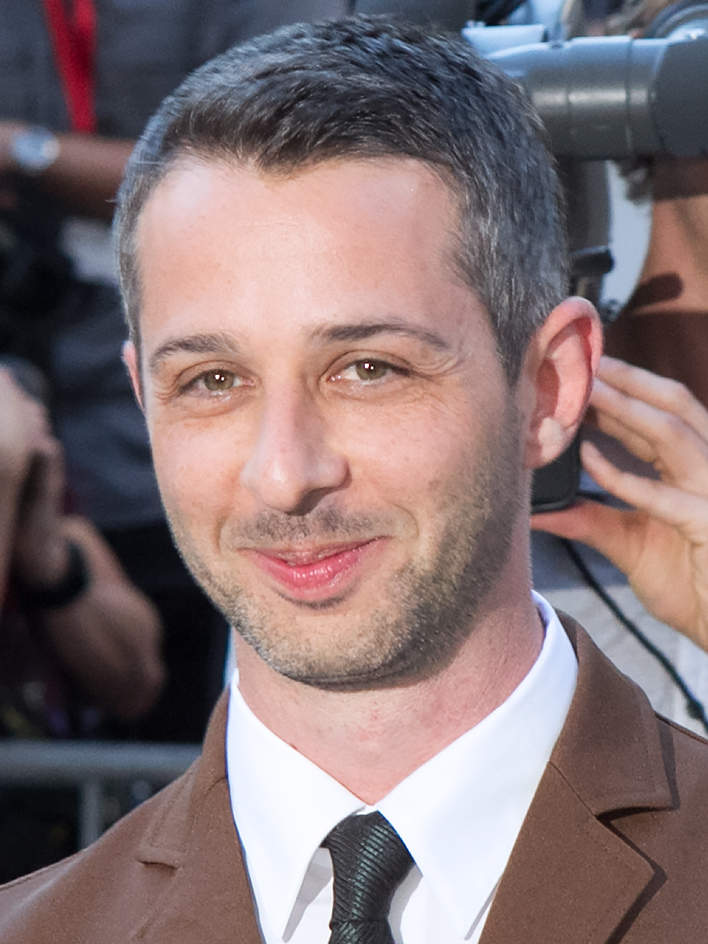
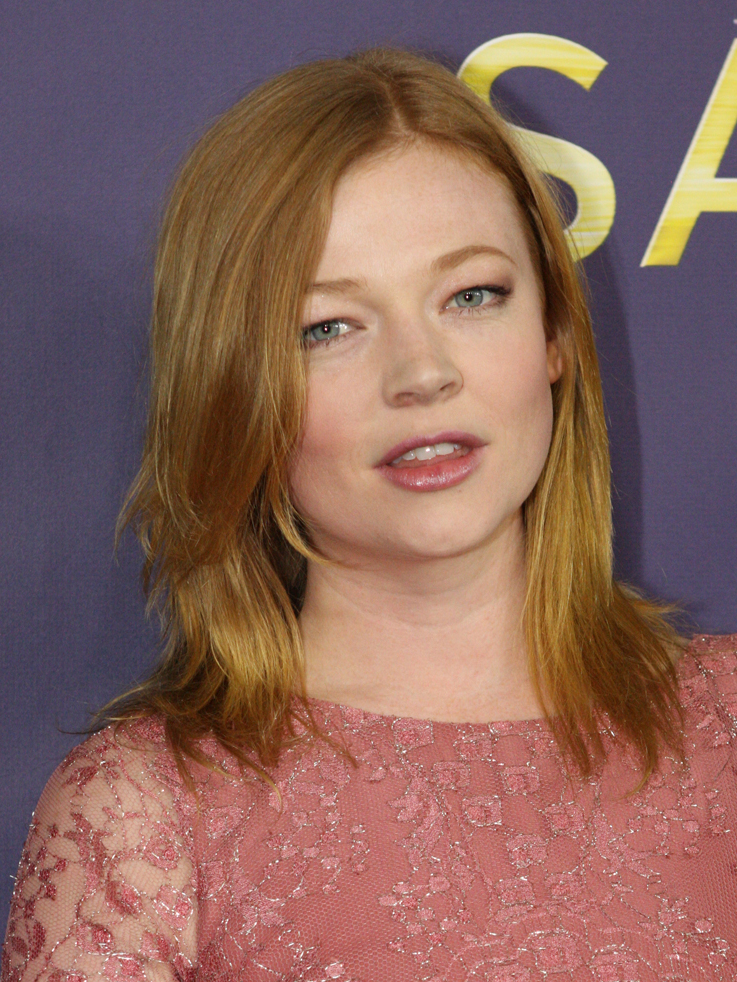
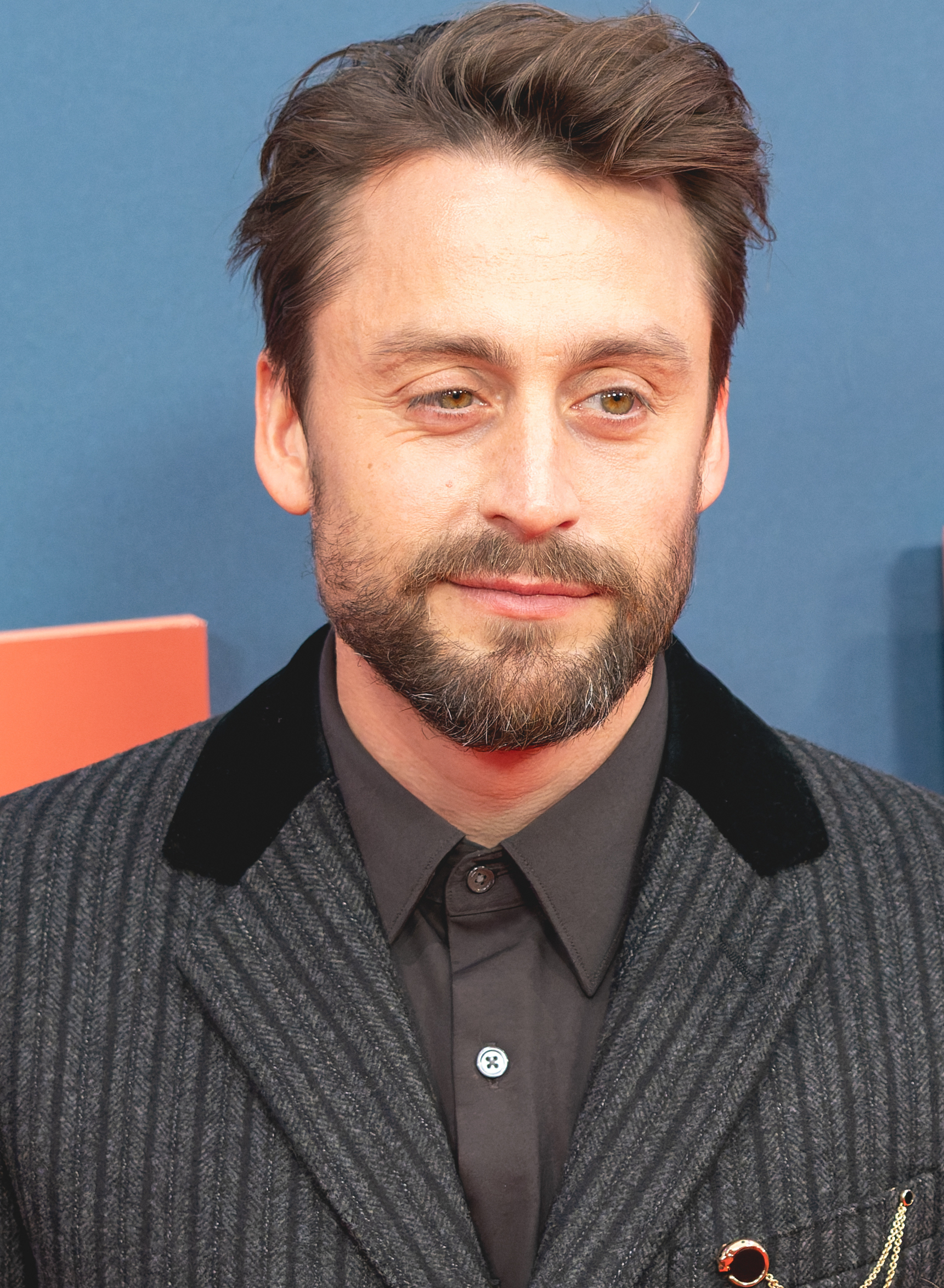
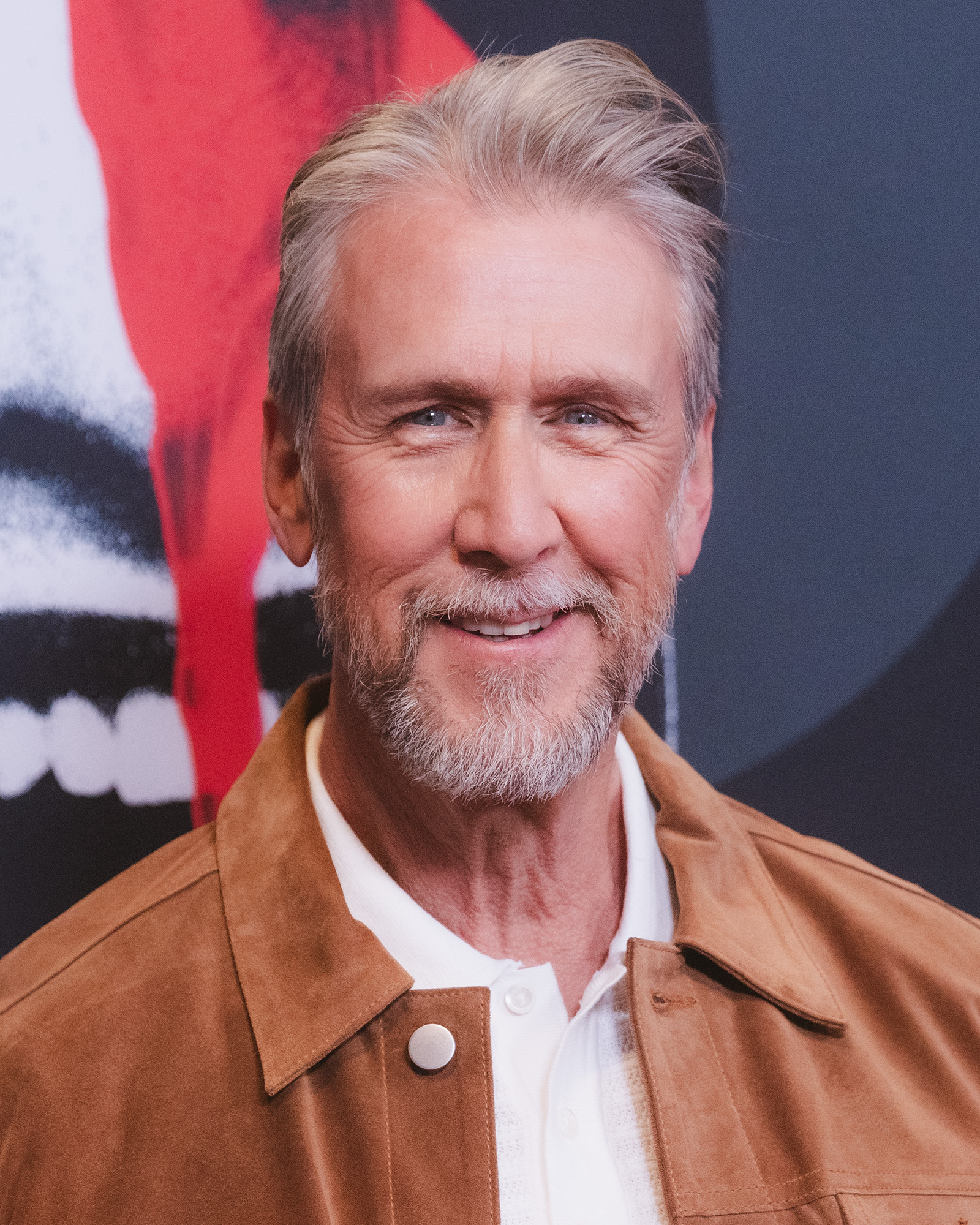
The performances of Jeremy Strong, Sarah Snook, Kieran Culkin, and Alan Ruck as the four Roy siblings were widely acclaimed by critics.

"Connor's Wedding" was universally acclaimed, with critics praising the performances of the central cast, Armstrong's script, Mylod's direction, and the series' surprise decision to kill off Logan early in the final season. On the review aggregator Rotten Tomatoes, it holds an approval rating of 100% based on 28 reviews, with an average rating of 9.9/10. The website's critical consensus states, "The King is dead. Long live Succession."

William Hughes of The A.V. Club gave the episode an A, calling it "the payoff to four entire seasons of Succession". He commended Mylod and Armstrong for "allow[ing] the middle of this entire episode to devolve into [a] mix of confusion, interspersed with moments of awful, crystal clarity". He also reserved high praise for the performances of Jeremy Strong, Sarah Snook and Kieran Culkin for "each giving portrayals of worlds now profoundly unmoored", singling out Culkin's as the "hardest-hitting". Scott Tobias of Vulture gave the episode 5 stars out of 5, calling Culkin "particularly devastating" and praising his performance in the episode for "quietly [turning] Roman into [a] James Dean in East of Eden type, adding layers of melancholy and self-loathing to the expected arsenal of nasty put-downs and 'quirky sits.'" Noel Murray of The New York Times praised the "absolutely harrowing" and "nerve-racking" middle sequence depicting the siblings reacting to Logan's death, and noted how the episode managed to include moments of dark comedy despite its dour tone. Murray further lauded Alan Ruck's performance for "wringing pathos from Connor's realization that neither the American voters nor his family really care about him", praising the "uncommonly touching" scene between him and Willa.

Sophie Gilbert of The Atlantic, who felt the series' "cyclical" premise had grown rigid in the previous season, applauded the series' decision to finally kill off Logan, feeling it allowed Succession to function "in a new mode, without Logan’s contaminating physical presence." Several critics praised Armstrong's decision to depict Logan's death off-camera. Gilbert felt it reaffirmed the character's humanity after several seasons establishing him as a larger-than-life presence, and called Strong, Snook and Culkin "extraordinary" in portraying the siblings' "chaotic shock". Judy Berman of Time wrote of Logan's death, "It’s a fitting demise, because it captures the whole point of Logan as a character: he makes monstrous decisions from on high and then leaves everyone around him to cope with the consequences." Berman felt the episode "excels in detailing how each of the show’s true main characters receive and react to the news", and praised the "emotional turmoil" conveyed by Strong, Culkin and Snook throughout the episode. Carol Midgley of The Sunday Times wrote, "In making [Logan's] ending quick and clean, the writers have ensured we remember him as he was, ogreish to the last."

Alan Sepinwall of Rolling Stone described "Connor's Wedding" as "an episode that TV historians will be analyzing and praising for a long, long time." Sepinwall praised Strong, Culkin, and Matthew Macfadyen for the "affecting" scene where Kendall and Roman first hear the news of Logan's ill health from Tom, while naming Shiv's reaction the episode's "most devastating and powerful moment", writing "it is extraordinary to watch Sarah Snook hold nothing back on that phone call scene." Sepinwall felt the episode lived up to the series' inherent promise of Logan's eventual death, writing, "Armstrong and company made sure the episode was able to meet the moment, in part by demonstrating how the Roy kids were not able to do the same." In 2024, Rolling Stone listed it as the 14th best TV episode of all time.

=== Accolades ===
TVLine named Sarah Snook "Performer of the Week" for the week of April 15, 2023, for her performance in the episode. The site praised Snook for "conveying how bewildering and surreal the initial moments of a loved one's death can be", writing: "We felt emotionally spent [...] after that hour of television, but we also knew that we witnessed something very special, thanks in large part to Snook's delicately crafted portrait of a child saying goodbye to a parent too soon."

At the 75th Primetime Emmy Awards, Jesse Armstrong and Mark Mylod won the Primetime Emmy Award for Outstanding Writing for a Drama Series and Outstanding Directing for a Drama Series, respectively, for the episode.

Award	Category	Recipient(s)	Result	Ref.
ACE Eddie Awards	Best Edited Drama Series	Bill Henry	Nominated	
Astra TV Awards	Best Directing in a Broadcast Network or Cable Drama Series	Mark Mylod	Won	
Astra TV Awards	Best Writing in a Broadcast Network or Cable Drama Series	Jesse Armstrong	Won	
Cinema Audio Society Awards	Outstanding Achievement in Sound Mixing for a Television Series – One Hour	Ken Ishii, Andy Kris, Nicholas Renbeck, Thomas Vicari, Mark DeSimone, and Micah Blaichman	Nominated	
Directors Guild of America Awards	Outstanding Directorial Achievement in Dramatic Series	Mark Mylod	Nominated	
Golden Reel Awards	Outstanding Achievement in Sound Editing – Broadcast Long Form Dialogue / ADR	Nicholas Renbeck, Dan Korintus, Angela Organ, and Andy Kris	Nominated	
Primetime Emmy Awards	Outstanding Directing for a Drama Series	Mark Mylod	Won	
Primetime Emmy Awards	Outstanding Writing for a Drama Series	Jesse Armstrong	Won	
Primetime Creative Arts Emmy Awards	Outstanding Music Composition for a Series (Original Dramatic Score)	Nicholas Britell	Nominated	
Primetime Creative Arts Emmy Awards	Outstanding Picture Editing for a Drama SeBill Henryzries	Bill Henry	Nominated	
Primetime Creative Arts Emmy Awards	Outstanding Sound Mixing for a Comedy or Drama Series (One Hour)	Andy Kris, Nicholas Renbeck, Ken Ishii, and Tommy Vicari	Nominated	

=== Impact on the Murdoch family succession ===
According to a December 2024 Nevada commissioner's report for the state's probate court in the disputed succession of Rupert Murdoch, the episode's depiction of the chaotic aftermath of Logan Roy's death in the episode prompted Murdoch's children to discuss their own public relations strategy for their father's death. Ultimately the discussions led to Elisabeth Murdoch's trust representative drafting a memorandum to create a plan to avoid a similar scenario from occurring in real life.

== See also ==
- List of television episodes listed among the best
