= James Manos Jr. =

American television writer and producer

- Born: Brooklyn, New York
- Occupations: Writer and Producer
- Notable work: Dexter; The Shield; The Sopranos

James Manos Jr. is an American film and television writer and producer.

== Career ==
Manos worked as a co-producer and writer on the first season of The Sopranos. In 1999, Manos won the Primetime Emmy Award for Outstanding Writing for a Drama Series for his work on the episode "College" of The Sopranos. The award was shared with his co-writer, The Sopranos creator David Chase.

He then completed two seasons as consulting producer on The Shield. He developed, produced, and wrote the pilot of Dexter, the Showtime drama series which lasted 8 seasons. He was nominated for a Writers Guild of America Award for best dramatic series for his work on the first season of Dexter.

Manos recently was the Executive Producer for 7 episodes of Ice for Direct TV and E-One Entertainment and executive produced the 8-episode order of South of Hell for Sonar Entertainment and WeTv. He wrote and sold the half-hour series "Staying Brown" about two Puerto Rican ladies from the barrio on the lam in Europe to Amazon as well as the one-hour comedy "The Slow and Complete Decompensation of Jim Manos" to TNT. He wrote "Chess" for the writer/producers David McFadzean and Matt Williams and "Brand" a series about the world of counterfeiting high end merchandise.

He wrote an independent feature film "I Am Lupe," about La Lupe, an incredible Afro-Cuban entertainer. Lauren Velez will star under direction by Manos himself. Arturo Sandoval is slated to score the film. Manos also wrote "The Ladies" for HBO's producer, Joe Pichirallo and a one-hour series "Crossroads" for Graham King.

He produced the award-winning movie The Positively True Adventures of the Alleged Texas Cheerleader-Murdering Mom, starring Holly Hunter and Beau Bridges, for HBO. The movie was nominated for six Primetime Emmy Awards and won three. Additionally, it won the CableACE Award for Best Picture of the year.

He also produced the critically acclaimed Apollo 11 and The Ditchdigger's Daughters.

A trained theater director, James received a degree from Colgate University in Hamilton, New York in English/Theater and studied as a director at The Royal Academy of Dramatic Arts in London, England. James also studied acting and later taught acting classes in New York. He has directed numerous plays regionally and in New York, including Inge's The Disposal, Mrozek's Vatzlav, Ionesco's The Lesson, Molière's The Doctor in Spite of Himself, and Arthur Miller's Some Kind of Love Story.

He also just completed a one-man Off-Broadway show "In the Pocket" which tells the life of Mark Rivera, a virtuoso musician who has always been a "sideman" but now he wants to stand in the limelight. He also wrote the black comedy, The Misconception which is being developed with the Cherry Lane Theatre in New York City for an Off-Broadway run.

Manos is also a novelist having written "Little Ellie Claus" published by Simon Schuster and "Marked", a cop franchise as a graphic novel for Graphic India, the Sharad Devarajan, and Gotham Chopra imprint.

He is represented by Michael Van Dyke at Inspired Entertainment and Alan Grodin at Weintraub, Tobin, Chediak, Coleman, and Grodin.

== Personal life ==
Manos is a Greek Orthodox Christian.

== Filmography ==
Year	Title	Credit	Role	Notes
1993	The Positively True Adventures of the Alleged Texas Cheerleader-Murdering Mom	Producer	Himself; Producer/Interviewer	TV movie
1996	Apollo 11	Actor	Simsup	TV movie
1997	The Ditchdigger's Daughters	Executive producer		TV movie
1999	The Sopranos	Co-producer / Writer		5 episodes
1999	Road Rage	Writer		TV movie
2002–2003	The Shield	Writer / Consulting producer		25 episodes
2006–2013	Dexter	Developer / Writer / Executive producer		96 episodes
2015	South of Hell	Executive producer		8 episodes
2016–2018	Ice	Executive producer		9 episodes
2017	Adrift	Producer	Patron	Completed
