= List of television shows listed among the best =

This is a list of television shows that television critics or magazines have considered among the best of all time. These television shows have been included on at least four separate best-of lists from different publications (inclusive of all time periods, networks and genres), as chosen by their editorial staff. Almost all the television shows that qualify for this list were produced in the United States, with just 11 of the 127 shows having been produced in other countries.

== List ==
There are currently 127 television shows in this list.

Television show	Genre	Release	Network	Ref.
24	Action	2001–2010, 2014	Fox	
30 Rock	Sitcom	2006–2013	NBC	(Note: 30 Rock:)
Alfred Hitchcock Presents	Anthology	1955–1965	CBS (1955–1960); NBC (1960–1962); CBS (1962–1964); NBC (1964–1965)	(Note: Alfred Hitchcock Presents:)
Alias	Spy fiction	2001–2006	ABC	(Note: Alias:)
All in the Family	Sitcom	1971–1979	CBS	(Note: All in the Family:)
American Idol	Music competition	2002–2016, 2018–present	Fox (2002–2016); ABC (2018–present)	(Note: American Idol:)
The Americans	Spy fiction	2013–2018	FX	(Note: The Americans:)
The Andy Griffith Show	Sitcom	1960–1968	CBS	(Note: The Andy Griffith Show:)
Arrested Development	Sitcom	2003–2006, 2013–2019	Fox (2003–06); Netflix (2013–19)	(Note: Arrested Development:)
Atlanta	Comedy drama	2016–2022	FX	(Note: Atlanta:)
Band of Brothers	War drama	2001	HBO	(Note: Band of Brothers:)
Barry	Crime drama	2018–2023	HBO	(Note: Barry:)
Battlestar Galactica	Science fiction	2003–2009	Sci Fi	(Note: Battlestar Galactica:)
Beavis and Butt-Head	Adult animation	1993–1997, 2011, 2022–2023, 2025–present	MTV (1993–2011); Paramount+ (2022–23); Comedy Central (2025–present)	(Note: Beavis and Butt-Head:)
Better Call Saul	Legal drama	2015–2022	AMC	(Note: Better Call Saul:)
Beverly Hills, 90210	Teen drama	1990–2000	Fox	(Note: Beverly Hills, 90210:)
Black Mirror	Anthology	2011–2014, 2016–present	Channel 4 (2011–2014); Netflix (2016–present)	(Note: Black Mirror:)
Boardwalk Empire	Crime drama	2010–2014	HBO	(Note: Boardwalk Empire:)
The Bob Newhart Show	Sitcom	1972–1978	CBS	(Note: The Bob Newhart Show:)
BoJack Horseman	Adult animation	2014–2020	Netflix	(Note: BoJack Horseman:)
Borgen	Political drama	2010–2022	DR1	(Note: Borgen:)
Breaking Bad	Crime drama	2008–2013	AMC	(Note: Breaking Bad:)
Buffy the Vampire Slayer	Supernatural	1997–2003	The WB (1997–2001); UPN (2001–2003)	(Note: Buffy the Vampire Slayer:)
The Carol Burnett Show	Variety show	1967–1978	CBS	(Note: The Carol Burnett Show:)
Chappelle's Show	Sketch comedy	2003–2006	Comedy Central	(Note: Chappelle's Show:)
Cheers	Sitcom	1982–1993	NBC	(Note: Cheers:)
Chernobyl	Historical drama	2019	HBO, Sky Atlantic	(Note: Chernobyl:)
Columbo	Crime drama	1968–1978, 1989–2003	NBC (1968–78); ABC (1989–2003)	(Note: Columbo:)
Community	Sitcom	2009–2015	NBC (2009–2014); Yahoo Screen (2015)	(Note: Community:)
The Cosby Show	Sitcom	1984–1992	NBC	(Note: The Cosby Show:)
The Crown	Historical drama	2016–2023	Netflix	(Note: The Crown:)
Curb Your Enthusiasm	Sitcom	2000–2024	HBO	(Note: Curb Your Enthusiasm:)
The Daily Show	Talk show	1996–present	Comedy Central (1996–present); Paramount+(2021–present)	(Note: The Daily Show:)
Dallas	Soap opera	1978–1991	CBS	(Note: Dallas:)
Deadwood	Western	2004–2006	HBO	(Note: Deadwood:)
The Dick Van Dyke Show	Sitcom	1961–1966	CBS	(Note: The Dick Van Dyke Show:)
Doctor Who	Science fiction	1963–1989, 1996, 2005–present	BBC1 (1963–1989, 1996); Fox (1996); BBC One (2005–present); Disney+ (2023–2025)	(Note: Doctor Who:)
Downton Abbey	Historical drama	2010–2015	ITV	(Note: Downton Abbey:)
ER	Medical drama	1994–2009	NBC	
Fargo	Crime drama anthology	2014–2024	FX	(Note: Fargo:)
Fawlty Towers	Sitcom	1975–1979	BBC Two	(Note: Fawlty Towers:)
Firefly	Science fiction	2002	Fox	(Note: Firefly:)
Fleabag	Comedy drama	2016–2019	BBC Three (2016); BBC One (2019)	(Note: Fleabag:)
Frasier	Sitcom	1993–2004	NBC	(Note: Frasier:)
Freaks and Geeks	Comedy drama	1999–2000	NBC	(Note: Freaks and Geeks:)
The Fresh Prince of Bel-Air	Sitcom	1990–1996	NBC	(Note: The Fresh Prince of Bel-Air:)
Friday Night Lights	Sports drama	2006–2011	NBC (2006–2008); The 101 Network (2008–2011)	(Note: Friday Night Lights:)
Friends	Sitcom	1994–2004	NBC	(Note: Friends:)
Futurama	Adult animation	1999–2003, 2008–2013, 2023–present	Fox (1999–2003); Comedy Central (2008–2013); Hulu (2023–present)	(Note: Futurama:)
Game of Thrones	Fantasy	2011–2019	HBO	(Note: Game of Thrones:)
Gilmore Girls	Comedy drama	2000–2007	The WB (2000–2006), The CW (2006–2007)	(Note: Gilmore Girls:)
Girls	Comedy drama	2012–2017	HBO	(Note: Girls:)
The Golden Girls	Sitcom	1985–1992	NBC	(Note: The Golden Girls:)
The Good Place	Fantasy	2016–2020	NBC	(Note: The Good Place:)
Good Times	Sitcom	1974–1979	CBS	(Note: Good Times:)
The Good Wife	Legal drama	2009–2016	CBS	(Note: The Good Wife:)
Grey's Anatomy	Medical drama	2005–present	ABC	(Note: Grey's Anatomy:)
The Handmaid's Tale	Dystopian fiction	2017–2025	Hulu	(Note: The Handmaid's Tale:)
Happy Days	Sitcom	1974–1984	ABC	(Note: Happy Days:)
Hill Street Blues	Police procedural	1981–1987	NBC	(Note: Hill Street Blues:)
Homeland	Spy thriller	2011–2020	Showtime	(Note: Homeland:)
Homicide: Life on the Street	Crime drama	1993–1999	NBC	(Note: Homicide: Life on the Street:)
The Honeymooners	Sitcom	1955–1956	CBS	(Note: The Honeymooners:)
House	Medical drama	2004–2012	Fox	(Note: House:)
House of Cards	Political thriller	2013–2018	Netflix	(Note: House of Cards:)
I Love Lucy	Sitcom	1951–1957	CBS	(Note: I Love Lucy:)
I May Destroy You	Comedy drama	2020	BBC One (UK), HBO (US)	(Note: I May Destroy You:)
In Living Color	Sketch comedy	1990–1994	Fox	(Note: In Living Color:)
It's Always Sunny in Philadelphia	Sitcom	2005–present	FX (2005–2012, 2025–present), FXX (2013–present)	(Note: It's Always Sunny in Philadelphia:)
The Jeffersons	Sitcom	1975–1985	CBS	(Note: The Jeffersons:)
Jeopardy!	Game show	1964–1975, 1978–1979, 1984–present	NBC (1964–1975, 1978–1979), syndication (1984–present)	(Note: Jeopardy!:)
The Larry Sanders Show	Sitcom	1992–1998	HBO	(Note: The Larry Sanders Show:)
Late Night with David Letterman	Talk show	1982–1993	NBC	(Note: Late Night with David Letterman:)
Law & Order	Legal drama	1990–2010, 2022–present	NBC	(Note: Law & Order:)
The Leftovers	Supernatural	2014–2017	HBO	(Note: The Leftovers:)
Lost	Science fiction	2004–2010	ABC	(Note: Lost:)
Louie	Comedy drama	2010–2015	FX	(Note: Louie:)
M*A*S*H	Comedy drama	1972–1983	CBS	
Mad Men	Period drama	2007–2015	AMC	(Note: Mad Men:)
The Mary Tyler Moore Show	Sitcom	1970–1977	CBS	(Note: The Mary Tyler Moore Show:)
Modern Family	Sitcom	2009–2020	ABC	(Note: Modern Family:)
Monty Python's Flying Circus	Sketch comedy	1969–1974	BBC1 (1969–73), BBC2 (1974)	(Note: Monty Python's Flying Circus:)
The Muppet Show	Variety show	1976–1981	ITV (UK), syndication (US)	(Note: The Muppet Show:)
My So-Called Life	Teen drama	1994–1995	ABC	(Note: My So-Called Life:)
Mystery Science Theater 3000	Science fiction	1988–1996, 1997–1999, 2017–2018, 2022	KTMA-TV (1988–1989), The Comedy Channel (1989–91), Comedy Central (1991–1996), Sci-Fi Channel (1997–99), Netflix (2017–18), Gizmoplex (2022)	(Note: Mystery Science Theater 3000:)
NYPD Blue	Police procedural	1993–2005	ABC	(Note: NYPD Blue:)
The Office	Sitcom	2001–2003	BBC Two (2001–02), BBC One (2003)	(Note: The Office:)
The Office	Sitcom	2005–2013	NBC	(Note: The Office:)
The Oprah Winfrey Show	Talk show	1986–2011	syndication	(Note: The Oprah Winfrey Show:)
Orange Is the New Black	Comedy drama	2013–2019	Netflix	(Note: Orange Is the New Black:)
Oz	Prison	1997–2003	HBO	
Parks and Recreation	Sitcom	2009–2015, 2020	NBC	(Note: Parks and Recreation:)
Prime Suspect	Police procedural	1991–2006	ITV	(Note: Prime Suspect:)
The Prisoner	Spy-fi	1967–1968	ATV	(Note: The Prisoner:)
The Real World	Reality television	1992–2019	MTV (1992–2017), Facebook Watch (2019)	(Note: The Real World:)
Rick and Morty	Adult animation	2013–present	Adult Swim	(Note: Rick and Morty:)
Roots	Historical drama	1977	ABC	(Note: Roots:)
Roseanne	Sitcom	1988–1997, 2018	ABC	(Note: Roseanne:)
Saturday Night Live	Variety show	1975–present	NBC	(Note: Saturday Night Live:)
Seinfeld	Sitcom	1989–1998	NBC	(Note: Seinfeld:)
Sesame Street	Educational	1969–present	NET (1969–70), PBS (1970–present), HBO (2016–20), HBO Max/Max (2020–25), Netflix (2025–present)	(Note: Sesame Street:)
Sex and the City	Comedy drama	1998–2004	HBO	(Note: Sex and the City:)
Sherlock	Mystery	2010–2017	BBC One	(Note: Sherlock:)
The Shield	Crime drama	2002–2008	FX	(Note: The Shield:)
The Simpsons	Animated sitcom	1989–present	Fox (1989–present), Disney+ (2024–present)	(Note: The Simpsons:)
Six Feet Under	Comedy drama	2001–2005	HBO	(Note: Six Feet Under:)
The Sopranos	Crime drama	1999–2007	HBO	(Note: The Sopranos:)
South Park	Adult animation	1997–present	Comedy Central, Paramount+	(Note: South Park:)
St. Elsewhere	Medical drama	1982–1988	NBC	(Note: St. Elsewhere:)
Star Trek: The Next Generation	Science fiction	1987–1994	syndication	(Note: Star Trek: The Next Generation:)
Star Trek: The Original Series	Science fiction	1966–1969	NBC	(Note: Star Trek: The Original Series:)
Stranger Things	Science fiction	2016–2025	Netflix	(Note: Stranger Things:)
Succession	Comedy drama	2018–2023	HBO	(Note: Succession:)
Survivor	Reality television	2000–present	CBS	(Note: Survivor:)
Taxi	Sitcom	1978–1982, 1982–1983	ABC (1978–82), NBC (1982–83)	(Note: Taxi:)
The Tonight Show Starring Johnny Carson	Talk show	1962–1992	NBC	(Note: The Tonight Show Starring Johnny Carson:)
True Detective	Crime drama anthology	2014–present	HBO	(Note: True Detective:)
The Twilight Zone	Anthology	1959–1964	CBS	(Note: The Twilight Zone:)
Twin Peaks	Horror	1990–1991, 2017	ABC (1990–91), Showtime (2017)	(Note: Twin Peaks:)
Veep	Comedy	2012–2019	HBO	(Note: Veep:)
Watchmen	Superhero	2019	HBO	(Note: Watchmen:)
The West Wing	Political drama	1999–2006	NBC	(Note: The West Wing:)
Will & Grace	Sitcom	1998–2006, 2017–2020	NBC	(Note: Will & Grace:)
The Wire	Crime drama	2002–2008	HBO	(Note: The Wire:)
The Wonder Years	Comedy drama	1988–1993	ABC	(Note: The Wonder Years:)
The X-Files	Science fiction	1993–2002, 2016–2018	Fox	(Note: The X-Files:)
Your Show of Shows	Variety show	1950–1954	NBC	(Note: Your Show of Shows:)

== Publications ==
The reference numbers in the notes section show which of the 17 selected publications list the television show.

- Business Insider – 2019
- Cosmopolitan – 2017
- Empire – 2008, 2025
- Entertainment Weekly – 2013 (1–10, 11–25, 26–50, 51–75, 76–100)
- Fotogramas – 2025
- IGN – 2017, 2023
- Marie Claire – 2025
- Radio France – 2019
- Reader's Digest – 2024
- Rolling Stone – 2016, 2022
- Screen Rant – 2024
- Télérama – 2023
- Le Temps – 2018
- Time – 2007
- TV Guide – 2013
- UGO – 2009
- Variety – 2023
- Die Zeit – 2018

== See also ==
Television

- List of most-watched television broadcasts
- List of television awards
- List of television episodes listed among the best
- List of television shows notable for negative reception
- TV (The Book), a collection of essays by television critics Alan Sepinwall and Matt Zoller Seitz, which includes narrative fiction only
- TV Guide's 50 Greatest TV Shows of All Time, which excludes miniseries

Other art forms

- List of anime series listed among the best
- List of films voted the best
- List of video games listed among the best

== Notes ==
The reference numbers show which publications include the television show.
