= The Telltale Moozadell =

- The Sopranos episode
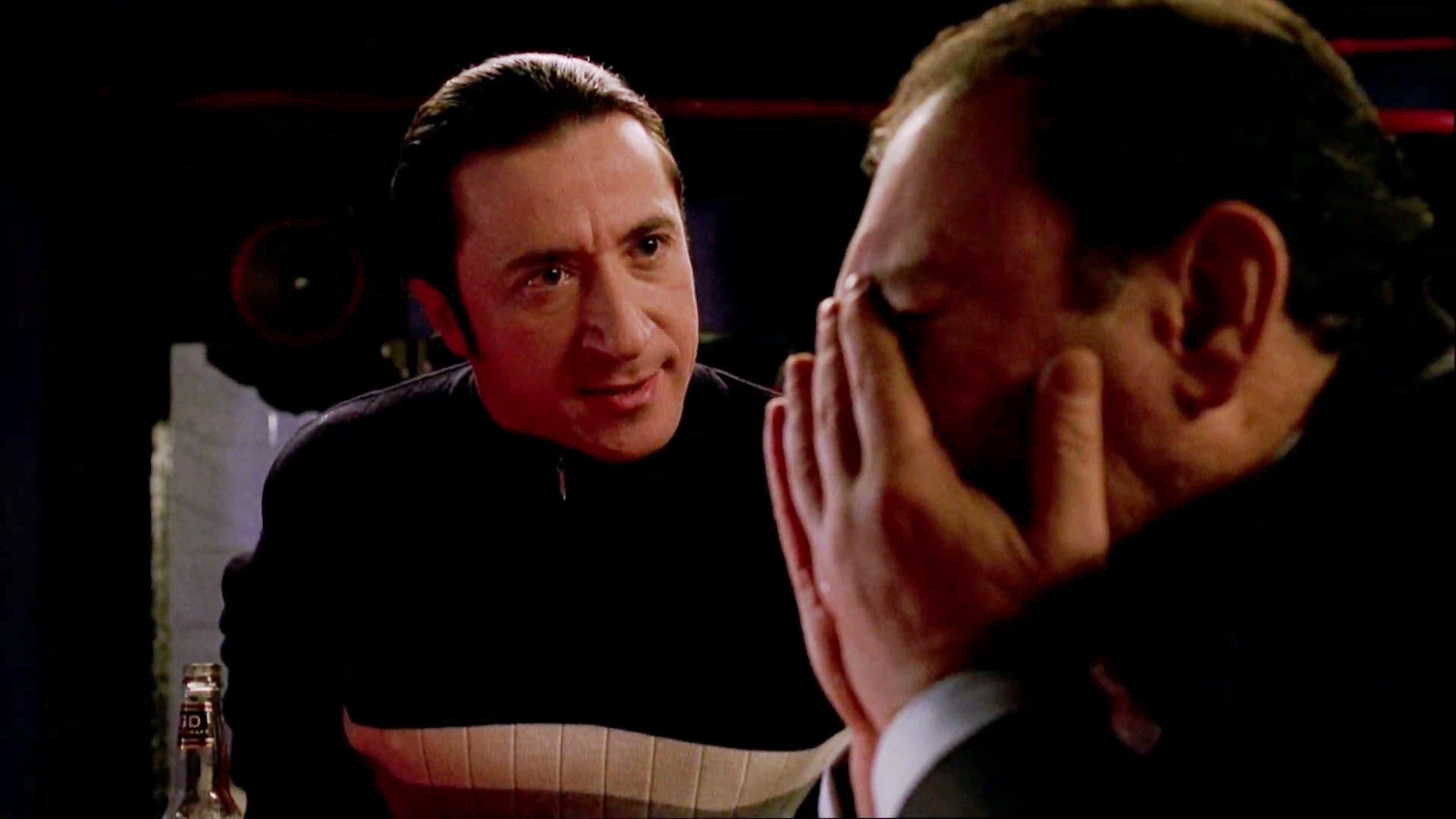
- Furio Giunta confronts Rocco De Trollio
- Episode no.: Season 3 Episode 9
- Directed by: Dan Attias
- Written by: Michael Imperioli
- Cinematography by: Phil Abraham
- Production code: 309
- Original air date: April 22, 2001
- Running time: 55 minutes

Episode chronology
← Previous "He Is Risen"	Next → "...To Save Us All from Satan's Power"
- The Sopranos season 3

"The Telltale Moozadell" is the 35th episode of the American crime drama The Sopranos and the ninth of the show's third season. It was written by Michael Imperioli and directed by Dan Attias. It originally aired in the U.S. on April 22, 2001, on HBO.

Less than a decade after the episode debuted, interest in "The Telldale Moozadell" was renewed due to online views of a scene including Stefani Germanotta, who by that point came to be known as the pop star Lady Gaga.

== Starring ==
- James Gandolfini as Tony Soprano
- Lorraine Bracco as Jennifer Melfi
- Edie Falco as Carmela Soprano
- Michael Imperioli as Christopher Moltisanti
- Dominic Chianese as Corrado Soprano, Jr. *
- Steven Van Zandt as Silvio Dante
- Tony Sirico as Paulie Gualtieri
- Jamie-Lynn Sigler as Meadow Soprano
- Robert Iler as Anthony Soprano, Jr.
- Drea de Matteo as Adriana La Cerva
- Aida Turturro as Janice Soprano
- Federico Castelluccio as Furio Giunta
- John Ventimiglia as Artie Bucco
- Joe Pantoliano as Ralph Cifaretto

* = credit only

=== Guest starring ===
- Jerry Adler as Hesh Rabkin

==== Also guest starring ====
- Tom Aldredge as Hugh De Angelis
- Sharon Angela as Rosalie Aprile
- Max Casella as Benny Fazio
- Jason Cerbone as Jackie Aprile, Jr.
- Louis Crugnali as Carlo Renzi
- Andrew Davoli as Dino Zerilli
- Stefani Germanotta as teenage girl
- Will McCormack as Jason LaPenna
- Turk Pipkin as Aaron Arkaway
- Annabella Sciorra as Gloria Trillo
- Suzanne Shepherd as Mary De Angelis
- Nick Tarabay as Matush

== Synopsis ==
A.J. and some friends break into their high school one night and go swimming. Some of them break into a teacher's office, throw supplies into the pool, and smash the trophy case. The police trace a custom pizza left at the scene to them. There is a conference between the school principal and the football coach, and Tony and Carmela with A.J. The Sopranos are surprised, and Carmela is angry, that A.J.'s punishment is going to be suspended because of his improved academic performance, and because it is in "his best interest – and the team's" for him to continue playing football. The principal says that any punishment should now be decided by the parents; they ground A.J. for a month with extra chores, such as cleaning the gutters.

Carmela is delighted with the large sapphire ring Tony gives her for her birthday. She later asks, "Is there anything you need to tell me?"

Tony is teased, provoked, thrilled, and fascinated by Gloria. At her request, he takes her to the zoo, and they have sex in the deserted reptile house. In a hotel room, undressing him, she is thrilled to find his gun. She says ironically, "Mr. Waste Management!" At her next session with Dr. Melfi she speaks of her happiness. Melfi asks about the man's voice she heard when Gloria last phoned her; Gloria seems offended and answers evasively. Melfi reminds Gloria that she attempted suicide when her last relationship failed. At Tony's next session he says that he had a very successful week and gives Melfi a bonus on top of his regular payment. She tries to refuse it, but he insists. She knows she is being lied to.

Carmela has begun to approve of Jackie Jr. as a romantic partner for Meadow, as he is helpful around the house and bonds with A.J., mentoring him in football. In a heart-to-heart with Tony, Jackie promises that he will work hard. Later, Tony runs into him at an illegal casino and angrily rebukes him, saying emphatically, "If you're spending time with my daughter, I want the best from you."

The Soprano family takes over a nightclub. Christopher tells Adriana that she will be the owner/manager. She renames it "Crazy Horse." On the club's opening night, Matush is caught dealing ecstasy in the bathroom and thrown out. Jackie tells Matush that he and Chris are associates. He asks Chris to let his friend Matush continue dealing inside the club; Chris dismisses him. Jackie then tells Matush that Chris permits him to deal outside the club. He does so and is badly beaten up by Furio and his men. At home, Jackie asks Ralphie for a "piece" and, without much questioning, Ralphie gives him a .38 revolver.

== First appearances ==
- Matush: Drug-dealer who hangs around the Crazy Horse.

== Title reference ==
- The episode's title is a play on Edgar Allan Poe's 1843 short story "The Tell-Tale Heart." Moozadell is rough Italian-American slang for mozzarella cheese (from the Southern pronunciation muzzarell') but can also be used as a derogatory name for an Italian man, according to Michael Imperioli.
- The title refers to Jackie Aprile, Jr.'s dishonest dealings with Tony and Matush.
- The swimming pool vandals get identified by their custom order pizza, which includes extra mozzarella .
- Jackie Jr. has Tony's daughter, Meadow, write his paper on Edgar Allan Poe for him.

== Production ==
- Michael Imperioli mentions that series creator, David Chase, is an avid W. C. Fields fan, and in one scene in this episode, Tony is watching It's a Gift. Also in the season 1 episode "46 Long," Tony performs an impression of Fields from The Bank Dick.
- In real life, The Lollipop Club was once owned by Vincent Pastore, who played Big Pussy Bonpensiero in the series.
- A.J.'s birthday present to Carmela is a copy of The Matrix (1999), which prominently features Joe Pantoliano (who plays Ralph Cifaretto) as Cypher.
- Beginning with this episode, Iler and Sigler are listed separately in the opening credits, instead of simultaneously.

== Music ==
- "Con te partirò" or sung in English as "Time to Say Goodbye"), by Andrea Bocelli, is played during the dinner after the singing of "Happy Birthday to You" to Carmela. It is a recurring song throughout the early seasons of The Sopranos.
- "I Will Follow You" by Percy Faith and His Orchestra plays as Carmela and Rosalie dine at Nuovo Vesuvio.
- At The Crazy Horse, "The Miami Relatives" band is portrayed by SCOUT.
- The song playing at the Bada Bing, when Chris is talking to Sil and then Jackie, is "Girl" by the band Vue (formerly Bellavista).
- The song playing at the gambling club is "Black Hearted Woman" by The Allman Brothers Band from their first album.
- The song playing while Tony is with Gloria in the hotel room is "Make No Mistake" by Keith Richards, from Live at the Hollywood Palladium, December 15, 1988.
- The song played over the end credits is "I (Who Have Nothing)" by Ben E. King.

== Reception ==
Television Without Pity graded the episode with a B+. Its review compared the scene of the police interrogating the pizza restaurant workers to a parody of Dragnet.

In his 2002 book The Sopranos on the Couch: Analyzing Television's Greatest Series, Brock University professor Maurice Yacowar considers Verbum Dei's decision to avoid expelling A.J. for vandalizing the swimming pool a "dangerous gift" that "defines the school as...self-serving".

In 2010, interest in this episode increased due to a YouTube clip of the scene featuring Lady Gaga, then aged 15 and credited under her real name Stefani Germanotta.
