= Fleabag =

British black comedy television series

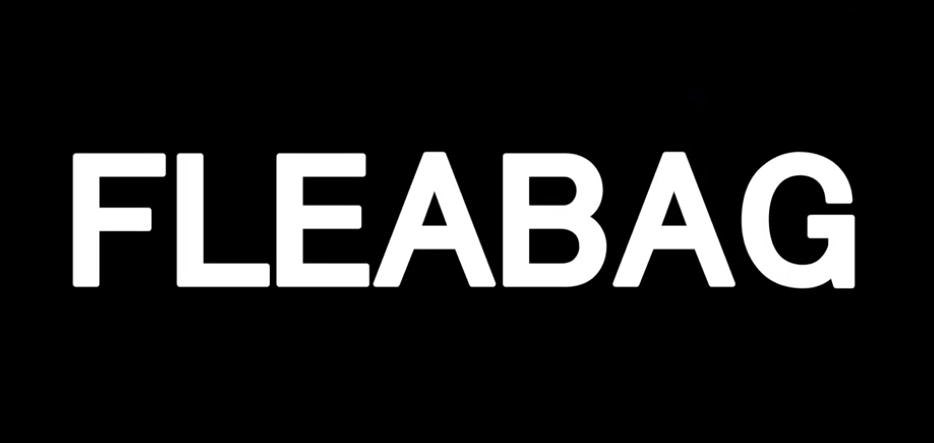
- Genre: Black comedy; Comedy drama; Cringe comedy; Tragicomedy
- Created by: Phoebe Waller-Bridge
- Based on: Fleabag by Phoebe Waller-Bridge
- Showrunner: Phoebe Waller-Bridge
- Written by: Phoebe Waller-Bridge
- Directed by: Harry Bradbeer; Tim Kirkby (pilot)
- Starring: Phoebe Waller-Bridge; Sian Clifford; Andrew Scott
- Composer: Isobel Waller-Bridge
- Country of origin: United Kingdom
- Original language: English
- No. of series: 2
- No. of episodes: 12

Production
- Executive producers: Phoebe Waller-Bridge; Harry Williams Jack Williams; Harry Bradbeer (s. 2); Lydia Hampson (s. 2); Joe Lewis (s. 2)
- Producers: Lydia Hampson (s. 1); Sarah Hammond (s. 2)
- Cinematography: Tony Miller; Laurie Rose (pilot)
- Editors: Gary Dollner; Paul Machliss (pilot)
- Camera setup: Single-camera
- Running time: 23–28 minutes
- Production company: Two Brothers Pictures

Original release
- Network: BBC Three (s. 1); BBC One (s. 2)
- Release: 21 July 2016 – 8 April 2019

Fleabag is a British tragicomedy television series created and written by Phoebe Waller-Bridge, based on her one-woman show first performed in 2013 at the Edinburgh Festival Fringe. The series was produced by Two Brothers Pictures for digital channel BBC Three, in a co-production agreement with Amazon Studios. Waller-Bridge stars as the title character, a free-spirited but angry and confused young woman living in London. Sian Clifford co-stars as Fleabag's sister Claire, with Andrew Scott joining in the second series; most of the show's main characters are unnamed, including Waller-Bridge's and Scott's. The protagonist frequently breaks the fourth wall, providing exposition, internal monologues, and running commentary to the audience.

The show premiered on 21 July 2016 and concluded its second and final series on 8 April 2019. It received widespread acclaim from critics, particularly for its writing, acting, and the uniqueness and personality of the title character. Many critics and viewers have called it one of the greatest comedy series of all time as well as one of the greatest television series of all time. Waller-Bridge won the British Academy Television Award for Best Female Comedy Performance for the first series, with the second series earning her Primetime Emmy Awards for Outstanding Comedy Series, Outstanding Lead Actress, and Outstanding Writing for a Comedy Series; additional nominations include acting categories received by Clifford, Olivia Colman, and guest stars Fiona Shaw and Kristin Scott Thomas. The series received the Golden Globe Awards for Best Television Series and Best Actress for Waller-Bridge, and a nomination for Scott.

The show is adapted from Waller-Bridge's 2013 Edinburgh Festival Fringe one-woman play of the same name, which previewed at Soho Theatre before its Edinburgh debut and won a Fringe First Award. Following Edinburgh, Fleabag returned to Soho Theatre for an Off West End run later in 2013. At the 2014 Off West End Theatre Awards (the Offies), Waller-Bridge won both Best Female Performance and Most Promising New Playwright for the production. The initial idea of the character of Fleabag came from a challenge by a friend, where Waller-Bridge was given the task of creating a sketch for a 10-minute section in a stand-up storytelling night.

== Cast and characters ==
=== Main ===
- Phoebe Waller-Bridge as "Fleabag"
- Sian Clifford as Claire, Fleabag's sister with whom she shares an uneasy relationship
- Andrew Scott as The Priest (series 2), with whom Fleabag falls in love

=== Supporting ===
- Ben Aldridge as Arsehole Guy (series 1; guest series 2), one of Fleabag's love interests, so named for his taste for anal sex
- Hugh Skinner as Harry, Fleabag's on-off boyfriend then eventual ex
- Hugh Dennis as Bank Manager (series 1; guest series 2), approached by Fleabag for a loan
- Jenny Rainsford as Boo, Fleabag's deceased best friend and business partner
- Bill Paterson as Fleabag and Claire's father
- Olivia Colman as Fleabag and Claire's godmother, who began a relationship with their father not long after their mother's death and eventually becomes their stepmother
- Brett Gelman as Martin, Claire's aggressive alcoholic husband

=== Guest ===
- Jamie Demetriou as Bus Rodent (series 1), one of Fleabag's love interests
- Fiona Shaw as Fleabag's counsellor (series 2)
- Jo Martin as Pam (series 2), who works at the priest's church
- Ray Fearon as Hot Misogynist (series 2), who serves as Fleabag's lawyer and one of her love interests
- Angus Imrie as Jake (series 2), Martin's teenage son and Claire's stepson
- Kristin Scott Thomas as Belinda (series 2), a successful businesswoman who meets Fleabag at an awards ceremony presented by Claire
- Jenny Robbins as Lesley (series 2), Claire's co-worker
- Christian Hillborg as Klare (series 2), Claire's Finnish business partner and love interest

== Episodes ==
Series	Episodes	Originally released	
Series	Episodes	First released	Last released
1	6	21 July 2016	25 August 2016
2	6	4 March 2019	8 April 2019

=== Series 1 (2016) ===
No. overall	Episode	Directed by	Written by	Original release date
1	Episode 1	Tim Kirkby	Phoebe Waller-Bridge	21 July 2016
Fleabag has a one-night stand with Arsehole Guy, before picking up another man on the bus, Bus Rodent, to whom she recounts how she split from her regular boyfriend, Harry. After being refused a business loan by Bank Manager for her failing café, she meets and argues with her high-achieving sister, Claire, at a feminist lecture. She visits her father and godmother (who is now in a relationship with her father), from whose home studio she steals a valuable sculpture of a woman's torso. On a taxi ride home, she recounts how her best friend Boo (with whom she started the café) accidentally killed herself while trying to fake suicide to get back at her boyfriend after he cheated on her.
2	Episode 2	Harry Bradbeer	Phoebe Waller-Bridge	28 July 2016
Fleabag tries to sell the stolen statue to Claire's art dealer husband, Martin. She runs into Arsehole Guy, but the awkward sex that ensues makes her run back to her emotionally fragile, on-and-off boyfriend, Harry. Harry leaves her for good, however, after she scares him in the shower, and after he discovers that she has been lying about giving up masturbation.
3	Episode 3	Harry Bradbeer	Phoebe Waller-Bridge	4 August 2016
Fleabag helps Martin buy a present for Claire, who is organising her own surprise birthday party. She reconnects with Bus Rodent and takes him to the party. To Fleabag's shock, Martin gives the stolen sculpture to Claire. Later, a drunken Martin attempts to kiss Fleabag, but is rebuffed.
4	Episode 4	Harry Bradbeer	Phoebe Waller-Bridge	11 August 2016
Courtesy of their father, Fleabag and Claire reluctantly visit a female-only silent retreat, where they frequently break the rule of silence. Fleabag admits to Claire that she stole the sculpture, and Claire asks her to return it. At the retreat, Fleabag runs into Bank Manager, who is attending a neighbouring workshop following a sexual harassment scandal at work. The two bond over their shared unhappiness. Claire reveals that she has been promoted to a lucrative position in Finland, but considers turning it down for the sake of her family. Fleabag attempts to persuade her to take the job by telling her of Martin's behaviour at the party.
5	Episode 5	Harry Bradbeer	Phoebe Waller-Bridge	18 August 2016
On the anniversary of their mother's death, Fleabag and Claire return to their family home for the annual memorial lunch. Fleabag takes the opportunity to restore the sculpture to her godmother's studio. Things get heated, and plans are being made for the godmother's "sex-hibition". Claire re-steals the sculpture for Fleabag, after which Fleabag rekindles her relationship with Arsehole Guy.
6	Episode 6	Harry Bradbeer	Phoebe Waller-Bridge	25 August 2016
Fleabag goes to the "sex-hibition", and finds that she was invited to act as a waitress; she makes a scene in response. She is dumped by Arsehole Guy, and then discovers that Harry has a new girlfriend. To Fleabag's surprise, Claire has turned down the Finland offer and decides to stay with Martin, who has convinced her that Fleabag made the move at the party. Their confrontation triggers a flashback, revealing that Fleabag was the woman with whom Boo's boyfriend cheated. After being turned away by her father, a heartbroken and guilt-ridden Fleabag contemplates suicide, but is stopped by Bank Manager, who happens to pass by. After listening to her confession, Bank Manager decides to offer her another shot at the business loan for the café.

=== Series 2 (2019) ===
No. overall	Episode	Directed by	Written by	Original release date
7	Episode 1	Harry Bradbeer	Phoebe Waller-Bridge	4 March 2019
Having cut ties with her family and taking steps to improve her life after the events of series one, Fleabag returns after one year to join an uncomfortable family dinner, celebrating her father's engagement. She finds herself intrigued by the priest, who is to officiate at the wedding. Claire has a miscarriage during the dinner but refuses to inform anyone or seek medical help. Fleabag covers for her by claiming the miscarriage. Martin's flippant attitude angers Fleabag, who initiates a physical fight with him. The sisters proceed to go to a hospital in a cab.
8	Episode 2	Harry Bradbeer	Phoebe Waller-Bridge	11 March 2019
To Claire's surprise, Fleabag's café is now a thriving business. The sisters visit their family, where Fleabag is once again treated dismissively by their step-mother to be. Claire reveals that Martin is planning to press charges against Fleabag for assault, but she arranges legal advice for Fleabag. Fleabag goes to a mental health counselling session, which affirms her desire for the priest. She connects with him, helps him out at a garden party and attempts to flirt with him.
9	Episode 3	Harry Bradbeer	Phoebe Waller-Bridge	18 March 2019
Fleabag helps with an award event at Claire's work, where she discovers Claire's crush on a Finnish colleague, Klare. The event almost ends in disaster but Fleabag manages to salvage the situation. Claire remains angry at her nonetheless. Fleabag has a profound conversation with Claire's co-worker Belinda at a bar. She continues to flirt with the priest, but he remains unwilling to violate his vows of celibacy. In a moment of metafiction, the priest begins to notice Fleabag breaking the fourth wall.
10	Episode 4	Harry Bradbeer	Phoebe Waller-Bridge	25 March 2019
The priest and Fleabag's pleasant day together ends on an unhappy note when she rebuffs his attempt at getting to know her more and helping with her troubles. She looks back on her painful memories of her mother's funeral. At night, Fleabag goes to pray at the church, where she meets the drunken priest and they establish a closer bond. After Fleabag's confession, they succumb to a moment of passion but the priest has second thoughts and is unable to carry through.
11	Episode 5	Harry Bradbeer	Phoebe Waller-Bridge	1 April 2019
The priest informs the family that he is no longer able to officiate at the wedding, before telling Fleabag not to visit his church again. Claire falls into a state of panic after having second thoughts about her new haircut. Fleabag comforts her and Claire is further reassured when Klare declares he loves her new look. Fleabag covers for Claire and argues with Martin, who is concerned that Claire is considering leaving him. Fleabag gets a visit from the priest, who reveals his feelings for her are more than physical. The two have sex, and Fleabag pushes the audience away.
12	Episode 6	Harry Bradbeer	Phoebe Waller-Bridge	8 April 2019
On the day of the wedding, Fleabag and the priest wake up together. At the garden wedding, Fleabag returns the stolen sculpture to her godmother, who reveals the figure was based on Fleabag's mother. Claire reveals to Martin the truth about her miscarriage, before begging him to leave her. Fleabag persuades Claire to go after Klare and helps her father through the wedding. After the ceremony, the priest and Fleabag admit their love for each other at a bus stop, but he states that he has chosen God. The two end things on amicable terms. Fleabag sees a fox and points it towards the priest. She walks away, leaving the audience behind at the bus stop.

== Distribution and broadcast ==
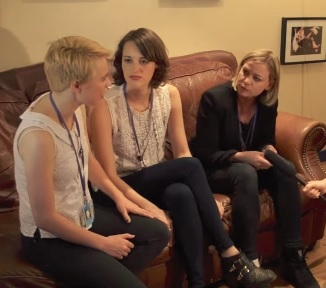
The women behind the Fleabag monologue interviewed at the Edinburgh Fringe Festival in 2013. Performer Phoebe Waller-Bridge is in the centre.

BBC Three was the original broadcast channel for the show with a repeat run broadcast on BBC Two between 21 August and 25 September 2016. The second series was broadcast on BBC One at the same time as being released on BBC Three, by this time only available online.

It was picked up by the on-demand Amazon Prime Video (formerly Amazon Video) service and premiered in the United States on 16 September 2016. Series 2 was released in the US on 17 May 2019. Fleabag is also available on IFC in the US. In the Netherlands, it was picked up by Net5.

The show has been remade for French television by Jeanne Herry. Titled Mouche (French for 'fly', the insect), it started airing on 3 June 2019 on pay channel Canal+. Mouche is a close remake, though set in Paris with Camille Cottin in the starring role.

== Production ==
=== Filming ===
Filming took place in and around London, mostly North West and Central with the primary location being Dartmouth Park, North West London. Street scenes were filmed on five main roads in the area, including Southampton Road, Laurier Road, Croftdown Road, Highgate Road, and York Rise. Other locations include Twickenham, Hampton Hill, Highgate, Tufnell Park, Belsize Park, Maida Vale, Kentish Town, Parliament Hill Fields in Hampstead Heath, Southwark, Bloomsbury, Soho, Stanmore, Lincoln's Inn Fields and Finsbury Square.

Bold Café & Restaurant in Dartmouth Park was used for Fleabag's Guinea Pig Café. Dad and Godmother's house was on Cambridge Park Road in Twickenham. The feminist lecture was at the British Museum's Lecture Theatre in Russell Square. The graveyard that Fleabag jogged through daily was at Kensal Green Cemetery. The silent retreat that Fleabag and Claire attended on Mother's Day was filmed at Hedsor House, an Italianate-style mansion used as a wedding venue in Maidenhead, Berkshire.

The second and final series premiered with a family dinner party filmed at the American steakhouse Smith & Wollensky in Covent Garden. Hot Priest's church was the Romanian Orthodox and former Anglican church St. Andrew's in Kingsbury. Godmother's sexhibition was held at the Tate Modern in Bankside. Claire's penthouse office was filmed from Heron Tower in Bishopsgate. The funeral was filmed at St Dunstan and All Saints Church in Stepney. The hair salon was 137 – Taylor and Taylor in Shoreditch.

Filming for the first series started in late April 2016, and was released from 21 July to 25 August 2016. Filming for the second and final series started in late August 2018 and was released from 4 March to 8 April 2019.

=== Music ===
Waller-Bridge's sister, Isobel Waller-Bridge, composed the music for both series.

== Reception ==
=== Critical response ===
Critical response of Fleabag
Season	Rotten Tomatoes	Metacritic
1	100% (42 reviews)	88 (19 reviews)
2	100% (99 reviews)	96 (21 reviews)

Both series of Fleabag received widespread acclaim from television critics. At review aggregation website Rotten Tomatoes, both series received approval ratings of 100%. The first series received an average rating of 8.5/10, based on 42 reviews, with the site's critical consensus reading: "Clever and viciously funny, Fleabag is a touching, wildly inventive comedy about a complicated young woman navigating the aftermath of trauma." The second series received an average rating of 9.3/10, based on 99 reviews, with the critical consensus stating: "Fleabag jumps back into the fray with a bracing second season that upholds its predecessor's frenzied wit and delicate heart, replete with Phoebe Waller-Bridge's indefatigable charisma". At Metacritic, the first series received a weighted average score of 88 out of 100, based on 19 critics, while the second series received a score of 96, based on 21 critics, both signifying "universal acclaim".

Emily Nussbaum of The New Yorker described the first series as "a precision black-humour mechanism, a warped and affecting fable about one single woman's existence." Maureen Ryan at Variety called it "scathingly funny", concluding that "long after it's pulled you in with its irreverence and jokes about sex, and beguiled you with its cutting wit and messily human characters, it reveals that it's actually a tragedy". Hank Stuever of The Washington Post characterised it as a "funny, highly profane but surprisingly poignant dramedy". Mike Hale in The New York Times praised the show for its "restless, almost feral energy and its slap-in-the-face attitude." Mary McNamara of the Los Angeles Times commended its unpredictability, acting, and "clear eye for truth that often becomes, like all good comedy, quite devastating".

The second series received unanimous acclaim and was considered a cultural phenomenon. Serena Davies of The Daily Telegraph lauded the second series as "a near-perfect work of art". Mary Elizabeth Williams of Salon praised its "brilliant swan song", finding the series's conclusion satisfying and "well-earned". For Rolling Stone, Alan Sepinwall wrote that the "tragicomic masterpiece reaches new heights in its second outing". James Poniewozik of The New York Times wrote that "the new season feels immediately confident, if inevitably less groundbreaking. Yet it continues to push its form". Hannah Jane Parkinson of The Guardian described the conclusion as "the most electrifying, devastating TV in years," writing of the second series that "it seems as though many who either did not watch the first series, or who didn't think it lived up to the hype, have been converted".

According to Metacritic's aggregate of decade-end lists, Fleabag was the second-highest ranked show of the 2010s. It has since been considered by multiple publications to be one of the greatest television series of all time. (Note: Attributed to multiple sources.) In September 2019, Fleabag became the first British show to win Best Comedy Series at the Emmy Awards in the United States.

Former United States President Barack Obama named the second season of Fleabag among his favourite films and television series of 2019. In his annual list, which he released on Twitter on 29 December 2019, he added a small addendum with the title, "and a quick list of TV shows that I considered as powerful as movies: Fleabag: Season 2, Unbelievable, and Watchmen."

In 2026, the show ranked 5th on The New York Times’ list of the 100 greatest television series of the twenty-first century.

=== Accolades ===
==== Stage play ====
Awards and nominations for the stage production of Fleabag
Year	Award	Category	Nominee(s)	Result	Ref.
2013	Fringe First Awards	Fringe First Award	Fleabag	Won	
2013	The Stage Awards for Acting Excellence	Best Solo Performer	Phoebe Waller-Bridge	Won	
2013	Evening Standard Theatre Awards	Charles Wintour Award for Most Promising Playwright	Phoebe Waller-Bridge	Nominated	
2014	Critics' Circle Theatre Awards	Most Promising Playwright	Phoebe Waller-Bridge	Won	
2014	Off West End Theatre Awards	Best Female Performance	Phoebe Waller-Bridge	Won	
2014	Off West End Theatre Awards	Most Promising New Playwright	Phoebe Waller-Bridge	Won	
2014	Susan Smith Blackburn Prize	Special Commendation	Fleabag	Special commendation	
2014	Laurence Olivier Awards	Outstanding Achievement in an Affiliate Theatre	Fleabag at Soho Theatre	Nominated	
2019	Lucille Lortel Awards	Outstanding Solo Show	Fleabag	Won	
2019	Drama Desk Awards	Outstanding Solo Performance	Phoebe Waller-Bridge	Nominated	
2019	Drama League Awards	Distinguished Performance	Phoebe Waller-Bridge	Nominated	
2019	Theatre World Awards	Outstanding Broadway or Off-Broadway Debut Performance	Phoebe Waller-Bridge	Won	
2020	Laurence Olivier Awards	Best Entertainment or Comedy Play	Fleabag	Nominated	
2020	Laurence Olivier Awards	Best Actress	Phoebe Waller-Bridge	Nominated	

==== Television series ====
Award nominations for the television series Fleabag
Year	Award	Category	Nominee(s)	Result	Ref.
Series 1
2016	Broadcast Awards	Best Comedy Programme	Fleabag	Nominated	
2016	Broadcast Awards	Best Original Programme	Fleabag	Won	
2016	Broadcast Awards	Best Multichannel Programme	Fleabag	Won	
2016	Critics' Choice Television Awards	Best Comedy Series	Fleabag	Nominated	
2016	Critics' Choice Television Awards	Best Actress in a Comedy Series	Phoebe Waller-Bridge	Nominated	
2016	Royal Television Society Craft & Design Awards	Editing – Entertainment and Comedy	Gary Dollner	Nominated	
2016	Royal Television Society Craft & Design Awards	Photography – Drama & Comedy	Tony Miller	Nominated	
2017	British Academy Television Awards	Best Scripted Comedy	Fleabag	Nominated	
2017	British Academy Television Awards	Best Female Performance in a Comedy Programme	Olivia Colman	Nominated	
2017	British Academy Television Awards	Best Female Performance in a Comedy Programme	Phoebe Waller-Bridge	Won	
2017	British Academy Television Craft Awards	Best Editing: Fiction	Gary Dollner	Nominated	
2017	British Academy Television Craft Awards	Best Writer: Comedy	Phoebe Waller-Bridge	Nominated	
2017	British Academy Television Craft Awards	Breakthrough Talent Award	Phoebe Waller-Bridge	Nominated	
2017	Broadcasting Press Guild Awards	Best Writer	Phoebe Waller-Bridge	Won	
2017	Dorian Awards	Unsung TV Show of the Year	Fleabag	Nominated	
2017	Golden Nymph Awards	Best TV Comedy Series	Fleabag	Won	
2017	Golden Nymph Awards	Outstanding Actress in a Comedy Series	Phoebe Waller-Bridge	Won	
2017	Gotham Independent Film Awards	Breakthrough Series – Long Form	Fleabag	Nominated	
2017	NME Awards	Best TV Series	Fleabag	Won	
2017	Rockie Awards	Best Comedy Series – English Language	Fleabag	Won	
2017	Royal Television Society Awards	Best Writing – Comedy	Phoebe Waller-Bridge	Won	
2017	Royal Television Society Awards	Breakthrough	Phoebe Waller-Bridge	Won	
2017	Television Critics Association Awards	Outstanding Achievement in Comedy	Fleabag	Nominated	
2017	Television Critics Association Awards	Individual Achievement in Comedy	Phoebe Waller-Bridge	Nominated	
2017	Writers' Guild of Great Britain Awards	Best TV Situation Comedy	Fleabag (for "Episode 1")	Won	
Series 2
2019	Primetime Emmy Awards	Outstanding Comedy Series	Phoebe Waller-Bridge, Harry Bradbeer, Lydia Hampson, Harry Williams, Jack Williams, Joe Lewis and Sarah Hammond	Won	
2019	Primetime Emmy Awards	Outstanding Lead Actress in a Comedy Series	Phoebe Waller-Bridge (for "Episode 1")	Won	
2019	Primetime Emmy Awards	Outstanding Supporting Actress in a Comedy Series	Sian Clifford (for "Episode 3")	Nominated	
2019	Primetime Emmy Awards	Outstanding Supporting Actress in a Comedy Series	Olivia Colman (for "Episode 4")	Nominated	
2019	Primetime Emmy Awards	Outstanding Directing for a Comedy Series	Harry Bradbeer (for "Episode 1")	Won	
2019	Primetime Emmy Awards	Outstanding Writing for a Comedy Series	Phoebe Waller-Bridge (for "Episode 1")	Won	
2019	Primetime Creative Arts Emmy Awards	Outstanding Guest Actress in a Comedy Series	Kristin Scott Thomas (for "Episode 3")	Nominated	
2019	Primetime Creative Arts Emmy Awards	Outstanding Guest Actress in a Comedy Series	Fiona Shaw (for "Episode 2")	Nominated	
2019	Primetime Creative Arts Emmy Awards	Outstanding Casting for a Comedy Series	Olivia Scott-Webb	Won	
2019	Primetime Creative Arts Emmy Awards	Outstanding Cinematography for a Single-Camera Series (Half-Hour)	Tony Miller (for "Episode 1")	Nominated	
2019	Primetime Creative Arts Emmy Awards	Outstanding Single-Camera Picture Editing for a Comedy Series	Gary Dollner (for "Episode 1")	Won	
2019	Satellite Awards	Best Musical or Comedy Series	Fleabag	Won	
2019	Satellite Awards	Best Actress in a Musical or Comedy Series	Phoebe Waller-Bridge	Won	
2019	Satellite Awards	Best Supporting Actor in a Series, Miniseries or TV Film	Andrew Scott	Nominated	
2019	Satellite Awards	Best Supporting Actress in a Series, Miniseries or TV Film	Olivia Colman	Won	
2019	Royal Television Society Craft & Design Awards	Music – Original Score	Isobel Waller-Bridge	Nominated	
2019	Television Critics Association Awards	Program of the Year	Fleabag	Won	
2019	Television Critics Association Awards	Outstanding Achievement in Comedy	Fleabag	Won	
2019	Television Critics Association Awards	Individual Achievement in Comedy	Phoebe Waller-Bridge	Won	
2020	Art Directors Guild Awards	Excellence in Production Design for a Half-Hour Single-Camera Series	Jonathan Paul Green (for "Episode 5")	Nominated	
2020	British Academy Television Awards	Best Scripted Comedy	Fleabag	Nominated	
2020	British Academy Television Awards	Best Female Performance in a Comedy Programme	Sian Clifford	Won	
2020	British Academy Television Awards	Best Female Performance in a Comedy Programme	Phoebe Waller-Bridge	Nominated	
2020	British Academy Television Awards	Virgin TV's Must-See Moment	"The Confessional Scene"	Nominated	
2020	British Academy Television Craft Awards	Best Director: Fiction	Harry Bradbeer	Nominated	
2020	British Academy Television Craft Awards	Best Editing: Fiction	Gary Dollner	Nominated	
2020	British Academy Television Craft Awards	Best Writer: Comedy	Phoebe Waller-Bridge	Nominated	
2020	Cinema Audio Society Awards	Outstanding Achievement in Sound Mixing for Television Series – Half Hour	Christian Bourne, David Drake and James Gregory (for "Episode 6")	Won (Note: Tied with Barry.)	
2020	Costume Designers Guild Awards	Excellence in Contemporary Television	Ray Holman (for "Episode 2")	Nominated	
2020	Critics' Choice Television Awards	Best Comedy Series	Fleabag	Won	
2020	Critics' Choice Television Awards	Best Actress in a Comedy Series	Phoebe Waller-Bridge	Won	
2020	Critics' Choice Television Awards	Best Supporting Actor in a Comedy Series	Andrew Scott	Won	
2020	Critics' Choice Television Awards	Best Supporting Actress in a Comedy Series	Sian Clifford	Nominated	
2020	Dorian Awards	TV Comedy of the Year	Fleabag	Won	
2020	Dorian Awards	TV Performance of the Year—Actress	Phoebe Waller-Bridge	Won	
2020	Golden Globe Awards	Best Television Series – Musical or Comedy	Fleabag	Won	
2020	Golden Globe Awards	Best Actress – Television Series Musical or Comedy	Phoebe Waller-Bridge	Won	
2020	Golden Globe Awards	Best Supporting Actor in a Series, Miniseries or Television Film	Andrew Scott	Nominated	
2020	Peabody Awards	Entertainment	Fleabag	Won	
2020	Producers Guild of America Awards	Outstanding Producer of Episodic Television – Comedy	Phoebe Waller-Bridge, Harry Bradbeer, Lydia Hampson, Harry Williams, Jack Williams, Joe Lewis and Sarah Hammond	Won	
2020	Royal Television Society Awards	Scripted Comedy	Fleabag	Won	
2020	Royal Television Society Awards	Comedy Performance: Female	Phoebe Waller-Bridge	Nominated	
2020	Royal Television Society Awards	Writer: Comedy	Phoebe Waller-Bridge	Won	
2020	Screen Actors Guild Awards	Outstanding Performance by an Ensemble in a Comedy Series	Sian Clifford, Olivia Colman, Brett Gelman, Bill Paterson, Andrew Scott and Phoebe Waller-Bridge	Nominated	
2020	Screen Actors Guild Awards	Outstanding Performance by a Male Actor in a Comedy Series	Andrew Scott	Nominated	
2020	Screen Actors Guild Awards	Outstanding Performance by a Female Actor in a Comedy Series	Phoebe Waller-Bridge	Won	

== Home media ==
Home media releases for Fleabag
Series	Episodes	Release date			Additional	Ref(s)
Series	Episodes	Region 2 DVD (UK)	Region B Blu-ray (UK)	Region 4 DVD (AU)	Additional	Ref(s)
1	6	3 October 2016	15 October 2018	28 March 2018	Distributor: Dazzler Media (UK); ABC DVD (Australia); Information: 1 disc (DVD & Blu-ray); 153 minutes; 16:9 (2.35:1); 16:9 (cropped 1.78:1) (Australia); Dolby Digital 2.0 (DVD); DTS-HD Master Audio 2.0 (Blu-ray); English subtitles (SDH); Rating: BBFC: 15; ACB: MA15+	
2	6	6 May 2019		TBA	Distributor: Dazzler Media (UK); Information: 1 disc (DVD & Blu-ray); 150 minutes; 16:9 (2.35:1); Dolby Digital 2.0 (DVD); LPCM 2.0 (Blu-ray); English subtitles (SDH); Rating: BBFC: 15	
1 & 2	12	6 May 2019		TBA	2-disc set (DVD & Blu-ray); 303 minutes; See individual release for all other information	
