= College (The Sopranos) =

- The Sopranos episode
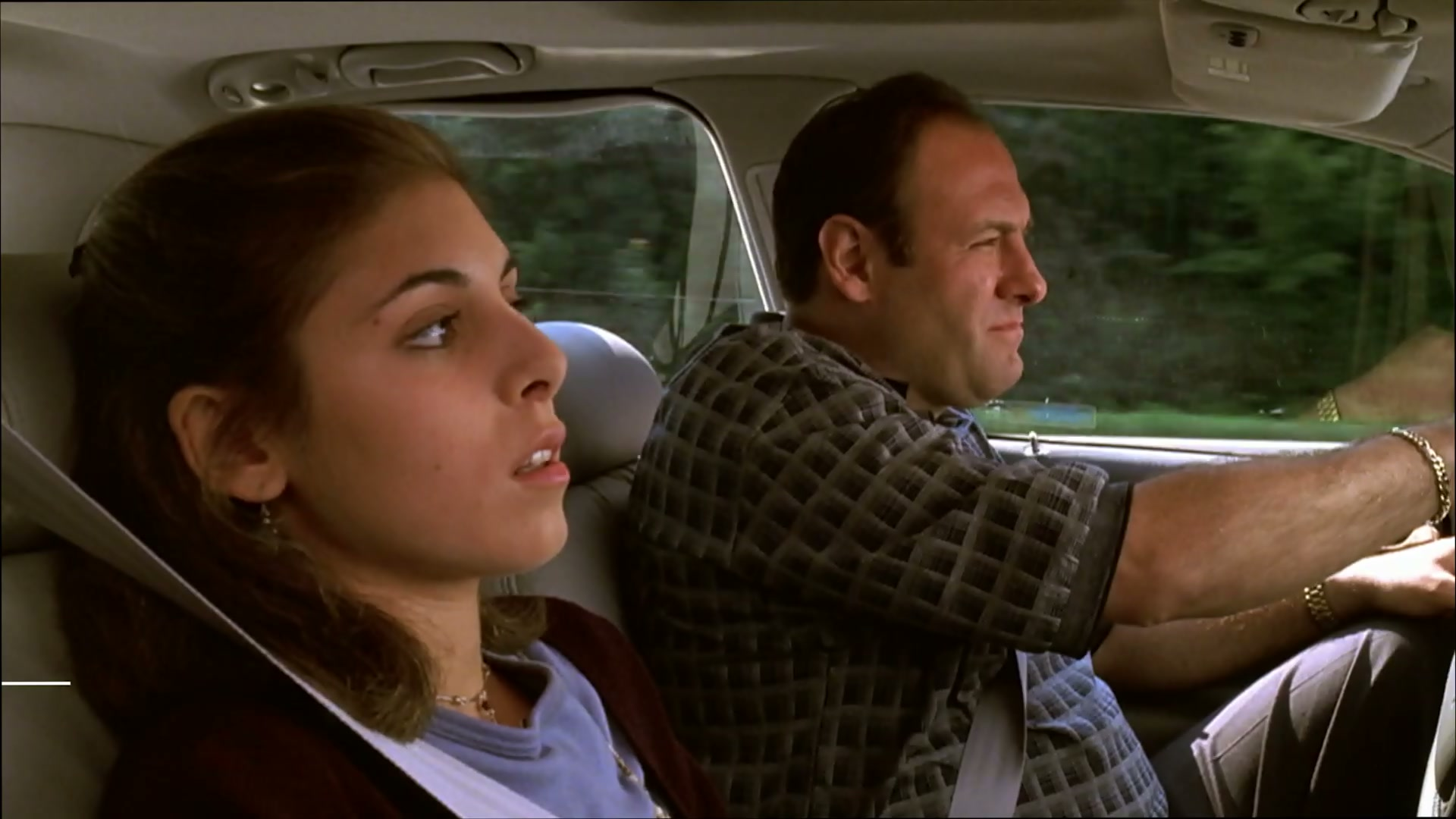
- Meadow Soprano asks Tony if he is in the Mafia
- Episode no.: Season 1 Episode 5
- Directed by: Allen Coulter
- Written by: James Manos Jr.; David Chase
- Cinematography by: Alik Sakharov
- Production code: 105
- Original air date: February 7, 1999
- Running time: 56 minutes

Episode chronology
← Previous "Meadowlands"	Next → "Pax Soprana"
- The Sopranos season 1

"College" is the fifth episode of the first season of the HBO television drama series The Sopranos, and originally aired on February 7, 1999. It was written by co-producer James Manos Jr. and series creator and executive producer David Chase. The episode was directed by Allen Coulter. The episode was ranked second on TV Guide's list of "100 Greatest Episodes of All-Time", published in 2009.

== Cast ==
- James Gandolfini as Tony Soprano
- Lorraine Bracco as Dr. Jennifer Melfi
- Edie Falco as Carmela Soprano
- Michael Imperioli as Christopher Moltisanti
- Dominic Chianese as Corrado Soprano Jr. *
- Vincent Pastore as Pussy Bonpensiero *
- Steven Van Zandt as Silvio Dante *
- Tony Sirico as Paulie Gualtieri *
- Robert Iler as Anthony Soprano Jr.
- Jamie-Lynn Sigler as Meadow Soprano
- Nancy Marchand as Livia Soprano *

* = credit only

=== Guest cast ===
- Paul Schulze as Father Phil
- Tony Ray Rossi as Fabian "Febby" Petrulio, aka Fred Peters
- Oksana Lada as Irina Peltsin
- Lisa Arning as Peters' Wife
- Ross Gibby as Bartender
- Mark Kamine as Admissions Dean
- Michael Manetta as Gas Station Attendant
- Keith Nobbs as Bowdoin Student
- Luke Reilly as Lon Le Doyene
- Sarah Thompson as Lucinda
- Olivia Brynn Zaro as Peters' Daughter

== Synopsis ==
Tony takes Meadow on a trip to Maine to visit three colleges she is considering. During the drive, Tony is taken aback when she asks if he is "in the Mafia" and instinctively denies it. When Meadow presses Tony, he admits that some of his income is from illegal gambling and other activities. Meadow admits that she took methamphetamine to study for her SATs but, when Tony reacts angrily, will not say where she got it. Both seem relieved by this mutual honesty on difficult topics.

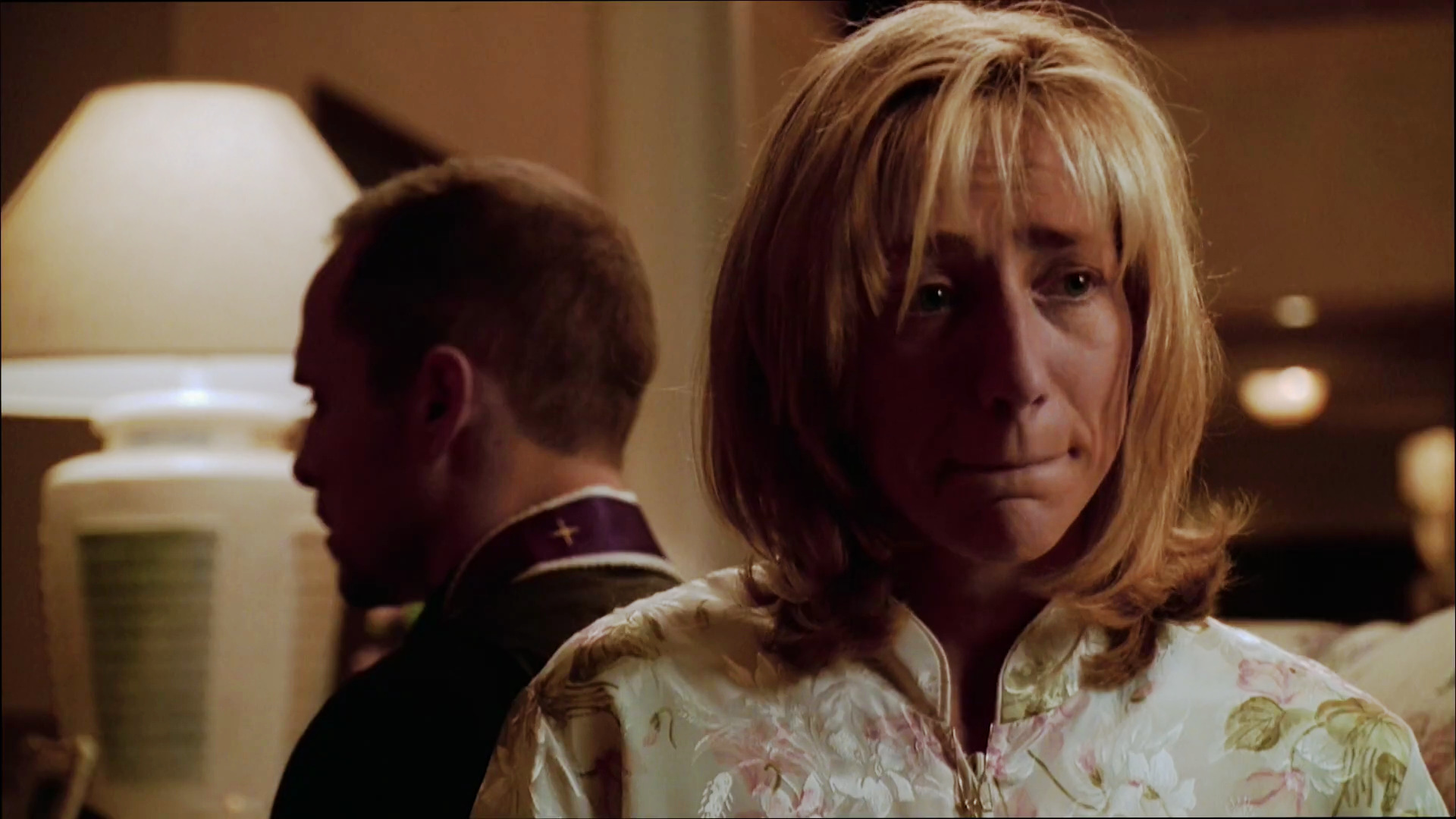
Carmela with Father Phil Intintola

At a gas station, Tony thinks he spots Fabian "Febby" Petrulio, a former member of the DiMeo family who entered witness protection after turning state's evidence. He contacts Christopher to run the plate number from his car and finds that he now goes by the alias "Fred Peters". Tony resolves to locate and execute Febby while continuing his trip with Meadow. He leaves her with some students she has met and checks out "Fred Peter's" address, hearing him with his wife and infant child, though it's dark and he is forced to flee when a dog starts barking. However, Tony confirms Febby's identity when, in the office of his travel business, he sees a carved bust: creating them was Febby's hobby. Febby feels someone is watching him and finds the motel where Tony and Meadow are staying. He points a handgun at Tony, who suspects nothing; the presence of Meadow and two other guests prevents him from taking the shot. The next morning, Tony drops off Meadow for a college interview. He finds Febby at his office and garrotes him. Later, during a drive to another college, Meadow asks Tony about the mud on his shoes and the cut on his hand. She senses he is not giving an honest answer and asks no further questions.

While Tony and Meadow are away, A.J. is sleeping over at a friend's house. Father Phil Intintola, the Soprano family's priest, visits the house to enjoy Carmela's cooking and wine. Dr. Melfi phones to reschedule Tony's appointment; Carmela, discovering that Tony's therapist is a woman, assumes that he is sleeping with her. During confession, Carmela tells Father Phil about her fears for her family and for her own soul, and he administers communion. She sips the wine, but he drains the cup, and they fall asleep together on the sofa. Half waking, they are about to kiss, but Father Phil suddenly desists and walks swaying to the bathroom, where he retches. He spends the rest of the night alone. In the morning, Carmela firmly says, "We didn't do anything." Tony and Meadow return later that day. Carmela tells Tony that Father Phil stayed the night. Tony implies he is a homosexual, and sarcastically mocks the situation. She counters his sarcastic comments by telling him that his therapist "Jennifer" called. Tony pleads with Carmela as she walks upstairs, telling her "we just talk, that's all."

== Production ==
Series creator David Chase has stated that when HBO first read the script, they objected to Tony's murder of Febby. Executives said that Chase had done so well in building Tony up as a sympathetic character that they believed if Tony committed such a cold-blooded killing, fans would turn on him and the show would lose its protagonist. Chase said that he believed fans would turn on Tony if the character did not commit murder because the omission would make him appear weak. Eventually, Chase won the decision and the episode has become a fan favorite.

Although not credited as a writer on the episode, it was writer and producer Frank Renzulli who hatched the idea that Tony would spot and kill a Mob rat who is in witness protection.

The college locations and the Maine scenes in "College" were actually filmed in rural New Jersey. The college exteriors are located at Drew University in Madison, New Jersey.

== Reception and accolades ==
=== Critical response ===
The episode was rated as the best of the series by publications such as Time magazine and Entertainment Weekly. It was ranked second overall on TV Guide's list of "Top 100 Episodes of All Time". Rolling Stone ranked the episode fourth on it's list of "The 100 best TV episodes of all time".

Emily St. James retrospectively wrote that "the genius of the episode is that the storyline blends almost every aspect of the show's world so completely that it feels like a natural thing we're watching, not really a story being told." St. James also praised the cinematography, which included cross-cutting and point-of-view shots, as "very effective at putting us in the headspace of both Febby and Tony as they slowly stalk each other", and lauded the episode as "a strangely funny, incredibly tense meditation on what it means to choose the easy path every single time."

Alan Sepinwall praised Chase's use of "only two stories so he could let them both play out in exhaustive, powerful detail", and wrote that the shot of Tony "staring wistfully up at a group of flying ducks, again standing in for the feelings of family and peace that seem to remain forever beyond his grasp – is ... stunning."

=== Awards and nominations ===
James Manos Jr. and David Chase won a Primetime Emmy Award for Outstanding Writing for a Drama Series for their work on this episode. Edie Falco received her first Primetime Emmy Award nomination and win for Outstanding Lead Actress in a Drama Series for her performance as Carmela in this episode.

== See also ==
- List of television episodes listed among the best
