= Mergers and Acquisitions (The Sopranos) =

- The Sopranos episode
- Episode no.: Season 4 Episode 8
- Directed by: Dan Attias
- Story by: David Chase; Robin Green; Mitchell Burgess; Terence Winter
- Teleplay by: Lawrence Konner
- Cinematography by: Phil Abraham
- Production code: 408
- Original air date: November 3, 2002
- Running time: 56 minutes

Episode chronology
← Previous "Watching Too Much Television"	Next → "Whoever Did This"
- The Sopranos season 4

"Mergers and Acquisitions" is the 47th episode of the HBO original series The Sopranos and the eighth of the show's fourth season. Its teleplay was written by Lawrence Konner from a story by David Chase, Robin Green, Mitchell Burgess, and Terence Winter. It was directed by Dan Attias and originally aired on November 3, 2002.

== Starring ==
- James Gandolfini as Tony Soprano
- Lorraine Bracco as Dr. Jennifer Melfi
- Edie Falco as Carmela Soprano
- Michael Imperioli as Christopher Moltisanti
- Dominic Chianese as Corrado Soprano, Jr. *
- Steven Van Zandt as Silvio Dante
- Tony Sirico as Paulie Gualtieri
- Robert Iler as Anthony Soprano, Jr.
- Jamie-Lynn Sigler as Meadow Soprano *
- Drea de Matteo as Adriana La Cerva
- Aida Turturro as Janice Soprano
- Federico Castelluccio as Furio Giunta
- John Ventimiglia as Artie Bucco
- Joe Pantoliano as Ralph Cifaretto

* = credit only

=== Guest starring ===
- Sharon Angela as Rosalie Aprile
- Fran Anthony as Minn Matrone
- Leslie Bega as Valentina La Paz
- Anna Berger as Cookie Cirillo
- Carl Capotorto as Little Paulie Germani
- Max Casella as Benny Fazio
- Charlotte Colavin as Lorraine Cirillo
- Matthew Del Negro as Brian Cammarata
- Heidi Dippold as Janelle Cammarata
- Frances Esemplare as Marianucci "Nucci" Gualtieri
- Dan Grimaldi as Patsy Parisi
- Anthony Patellis as Chuckie Cirillo
- Paul Schulze as Father Phil Intintola
- David Margulies as Neil Mink
- Nino DelDuca as Uncle Maurizio
- Tone Christensen as Miss Reykjavik
- Modi Rosenfeld as Etan
- Candy Trabucco as Antoinette Giaculo

== Synopsis ==
Paulie's mother Nucci moves into Green Grove retirement home and is looking forward to being with old friends, including Cookie Cirillo. But Cookie has her own group, and Nucci is ostracized. Paulie visits Cookie's son Chuckie, who he knew in childhood at school; he is now a school principal. He presents him with a suitcase and firmly asks him to persuade his mother to be more friendly, but nothing changes. Chuckie is then visited by Benny and Little Paulie, who chase him through the school and break his right arm. Chuckie's wife threatens to take Cookie out of the nursing home if she does not make peace with Nucci.

Carmela is thinking about Furio who is back in Naples, where his father has died. He confides to his uncle that he is in love with the boss's wife. His uncle tells him the only way to have her is to kill the boss. Furio says he knows.

Tony starts giving directions to his underlings through payphone calls to Christopher, but he is bored and keeps micro-managing. At the stables, he meets Ralphie's new girlfriend, the Cuban-Italian Valentina La Paz. She works in a picture-framing company and arranges for Tony to commission a portrait of himself with Pie-O-My. They start an affair. She wants to keep seeing him, but Tony will not share her with Ralphie. To persuade him, she tells him that Ralphie is only interested in masochistic fantasies and never has (as Tony puts it to Dr. Melfi) "penissary contact with her volvo." But he continues to rebuff her until she breaks up with Ralphie and her claims about his fetishes are confirmed (in return for payment) by Janice.

Carmela is infuriated when she discovers a false fingernail—belonging to Valentina—in Tony's clothes. She takes two packets, totaling $40,000, of the money Tony has hidden in the bird feeder, and invests it with stockbrokers. She ensures Tony finds the fingernail and realizes what she has done. At breakfast, while she makes coffee, they ask each other if they have anything to talk about, and both say no. Silence ensues.

== First appearances ==
- Valentina La Paz: An art dealer and Ralph's girlfriend, who quickly falls for Tony.
- Minn Matrone: Friend of Paulie's mother, Nucci Gualtieri at Green Grove.

== Deceased ==
- Mr Giunta: Furio's father, who died from cancer.

== Title reference ==
The phrase mergers and acquisitions refers to the aspect of corporate finance strategy and management dealing with the merging and acquiring of different companies as well as other assets.

== References to other media ==
- Janice watches Robot Wars on television, with the original commentary from Jonathan Pearce audible.
- Tony watches the 1993 film, The Fugitive (which includes castmate Joe Pantoliano) on his new widescreen television.
- Tony references the film Hud, which starred Paul Newman, when Carmela's cousin mistakenly references the HUD scam to Carmela at dinner.
- When Tony shows Carmela the new media center he has installed in the pool house, she replies that she will pick up the movie, In the Bedroom, for them to watch.
- When lying in bed Carmela is reading The Mists of Avalon, a 1983 novel by Marion Zimmer Bradley.
- Ralph refers to Valentina as "my Chiquita Banana" and "the Mambo Queen."
- A distraught Nucci tells Paulie that in an effort to be friendly, she bought Cookie a card from the gift shop (to no effect). She says "I cared enough, and I sent the very best," a reference to the Hallmark slogan.
- Carmela watches the television show Mario Eats Italy. The ponytail of the host, Mario Batali, sends her into reverie about Furio.

== Music ==
- Tony listens to "Bell Bottom Blues" by Derek and the Dominos on his new entertainment center. He comments that "it's like Clapton's sitting right there in your house."
- The bagpipe music Tony listens to on the entertainment system is "The Inverness Gathering," performed by the Edinburgh City Police Pipe Band.
- Tony falls asleep in front of his home theater and wakes up as Pink Floyd's The Dark Side of the Moon approaches its end. The closing track "Eclipse" is playing when he wakes. Later in the episode, when he is in the shower, he is singing fragments from "Another Brick in the Wall (Part II)" also by Pink Floyd.
- Parts of "Vesuvio" by Spaccanapoli (previously heard in "The Weight") play whenever Carmela remembers Furio.
- The song played over the end credits is "When the Battle is Over" by Delaney & Bonnie.
