= Spaccanapoli =

Spaccanapoli may refer to:

- Spaccanapoli (street), a street in Naples, Italy
- Spaccanapoli (band), a band from Naples named after the street
