= Hasbrouck Institute =

Former private school in Jersey City, New Jersey

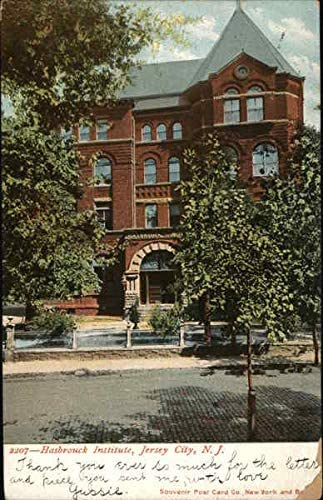
- Main building of Hasbrouck Institute, 1906

Location
- Jersey City, New Jersey; United States; 40°43′1″N 74°4′14″W

Information
- School type: Private, College-preparatory school
- Established: 1893
- Founder: Washington Hasbrouck
- Closed: 1912
- Principal: Washington Hasbrouck (1856–1876); Charles C. Stimets (1876–1912)
- Gender: Boys (1856–1879); Co-ed (1880–1912)

Hasbrouck Institute was a private college-preparatory school located in Jersey City, in Hudson County, New Jersey.

== History ==
=== Founding and early development ===
Hasbrouck Institute was founded as an all-boys private school in 1856 by Dr. Washington Hasbrouck in a downtown building at Mercer and Barrow Streets in Jersey City, New Jersey. In May 1866, he moved the school to the Lyceum Building on 109 Grand Street, which he had taken over earlier that year, opening with 67 pupils, while his brother Peter Hasbrouck became vice principal.

For 20 years, the school was under the direction of Dr. Hasbrouck. During his tenure, enrollment reached a high of over 200 students. Following the panic of 1873, the school experienced a rapid decline in attendance. The founding principal left the institute in 1876 to head the State Normal School (now The College of New Jersey) in Trenton, New Jersey, with Henry C. Miller and Charles C. Stimets succeeding him. At the time, Miller, a Williams College graduate, and Stimets served as instructors at the Trenton Normal School. Stimets resigned that year and joined H. C. Miller in purchasing the Hasbrouck Institute. The school reopened in September 1876, and during the first year, it increased in numbers from 50 to 80. In the year that followed, Horace C. Wait, a Yale graduate, was added to the school's staff. In 1880, H. C. Miller stepped away from active involvement in the institute and, together with Stimets, bought the New York School of Languages. Hasbrouck was boys-only in its early years and became co-ed in 1880. The first floor of the institute building was refitted in the summer of 1880 after a petition and much deliberation. The girls’ department was led by Carrie Stow, later Mrs. Horace Wait. Her assistant was Jennie C. Drake, a Vassar College graduate. Enrollment rose to 30 girls by autumn and expanded to 80 by 1884. When Stow resigned in 1883, Drake took over as superintendent of the girls' division.

=== Crescent and Harrison Avenue period ===
The movement of Jersey City's more affluent population to Bergen Hill prompted the Hasbrouck Institute to relocate uptown, acquiring property at Crescent and Harrison Avenues in 1892. The cornerstone of the new Hasbrouck Institute building was laid on November 24, 1892, by New Jersey Governor Leon Abbett, with George L. Bettcher as architect. With grounds, buildings, and equipment valued at $100,000, it developed into one of New Jersey's largest and best-equipped preparatory schools. The first classes were held in September 1893 and the school thrived at that location until after the turn of the century.

The institution was registered by the New York State Board of Regents, and its diploma secured its graduates the "48-count certificate," admitting them, without further examination, to all the law, dentistry, or medical schools and many colleges. Six departments were maintained, each having its own superintendent: the Academic, the Primary, the School of Music, the Intermediate, the Kindergarten, and the School of Art. The Hasbrouck Institute offered a broad curriculum, providing instruction from the earliest school age to the period of completing their preparation for college, professional schools, or business. Its flexible academic program allowed students to prepare for higher education or enter business fields, with options to focus on classical studies, modern languages, science, or commercial subjects. The institute was well equipped, particularly in the sciences, with laboratory facilities comparable to those found in colleges and leading professional schools. Additional offerings included a fully appointed gymnasium, as well as the programs in art and music.

From its establishment, the Hasbrouck Institute was run as a private, unincorporated school. The institution was formally incorporated in 1899. By 1903, more than 600 students had graduated from the institute, and about half went on to college or professional training. Hasbrouck graduates continued their education at institutions including Yale, Harvard, Columbia, Princeton, Williams, Rutgers, Cornell, the University of the City of New York, Vassar, Smith, and leading scientific and professional schools. The Hasbrouck Institute provided early education for many of Hudson County's leading bankers, lawyers, and physicians.

On February 13, 1906, Dr. Booker T. Washington lectured at the Hasbrouck Institute.

=== Decline and closure ===
The expansion of a larger and more efficient Jersey City school system led to declining enrollment at Hasbrouck in the years before World War I. The Hasbrouck Institute was purchased in 1912 for $117,000 by the Jersey City Board of Education as part of its school building expansion program, intended for a new high school. After 36 years, the administration of Prof. C. C. Stimets came to an end. For several years before its closure, the Hasbrouck Institute held classes in private homes. The girls' division transferred to the Bergen School for Girls in 1914. The institution held its 59th and final graduation ceremony on June 11, 1915. Horace C. Wait later joined the faculty of a New York high school, and C. C. Stimets closed the institution. The building had been demolished by 1920. The site is now part of the campus of Jersey City's Lincoln High School.

== Principal ==
- Washington Hasbrouck
- Charles C. Stimets

== Notable alumni ==
- John T. Rowland
- Joseph Dear II
- Peter Henderson
- Henry Janeway Hardenbergh
- Florence Turner-Maley
- William H. Cane

== See also ==
- Lincoln High School
