= Frank Ervin =

American harness racing driver (1904–1991)

Personal information
- Born: William Frank Ervin; August 12, 1904 Pekin, Illinois, U.S.
- Died: September 30, 1991 (aged 87) Winter Park, Florida, U.S.
- Occupations: Harness racing driver; horse trainer
- Years active: 1920-1974

Horse racing career
- Sport: Harness racing

Major racing wins
- Abbedale Stake Two-Year-Old Pace (1949); Abbedale Stake Three-Year-Old Pace (1945, 1947); Acorn Stake (1948); American-National Stake Pace (1948); Bostwick (1946, 1948); B.P.O.E. Stake (1948, 1949); Coaching Club Trotting Oaks (1949); Fox Stake Pace (1948, 1949); Geers Stake Two-Year-Old Pace (1949); Geers Stake Three-Year-Old Pace (1949); E. H. Harriman Challenge Trophy (1946); Little Brown Jug (1949, 1953, 1965); Little Pat Stake (1949); Matron Stake Pace (1949); McMahon Memorial (1948); National Pacing Derby (1950); Ohio Standardbred Futurity (1946); Review Futurity Pace (1949); Trotting Club Stake Pace (1949); Village Farm Stake Three-Year-Old Pace (1948, 1949); Walnut Hall Cup (1952); Transylvania Trot (1952); Hambletonian Stakes (1959, 1966, 1967); Cane Pace (1965); Messenger Stakes (1965)

Honors
- Missouri Sports Hall of Fame (1967); United States Harness Racing Hall of Fame (1969)

Significant horses
- Bret Hanover; Good Time; Keystoner; Diller Hanover

Frank Ervin (August 12, 1904 – September 30, 1991) was an American harness racing driver and horse trainer, best known for driving Bret Hanover to the Pacing Triple Crown in 1965 and winning three Hambletonian Stakes.

== Early life and education ==
William Frank Ervin was born on August 12, 1904, in Pekin, Illinois, United States.

He came from a long line of horsemen, with his father, Frank Ervin Sr., active on the racing circuit during the late 19th century. Widely regarded as one of the leading trainer-drivers of his generation, Frank's father competed in the sport from 1890 through 1928. At the time of his birth in Pekin, his father was training horses for Norman Jay Colman of Missouri. When Coleman transferred his stable operations to the Missouri State Fairgrounds, the Ervin family moved to Sedalia, Missouri.

He completed his formal education through the eighth grade before he dropped out of highschool and became involved in harness racing. He worked alongside his father from an early age as a horse groom and assistant trainer until 1919 before beginning his driving career.

== Career ==
At age 16, Ervin was entered in his first official race when his father allowed him to pilot Black Diamond in a $1,000 stake event. He went on to secure his first win with Black Diamond at the Coles County Fair in Charleston, Illinois. He made four starts as a driver in 1920 and ended the season undefeated. His early experience was restricted to a few drives in 1921, until his father was badly injured in an Aurora racing crash in 1922, after which he began driving more regularly.

He formed his own stable in Oklahoma in 1924. Ervin raced a string owned by a man named Wilson of Okmulgee on the Kansas–Oklahoma circuit. Severe injuries suffered in 1927 sidelined him from racing for the next three years. During his absence from the sport, he operated a filling station and later worked as a railroad brakeman. Ervin reestablished himself as a driver in California in 1941 and quickly found success with High Volo, the year's leading money-winning horse.

During the spring of 1944, Ervin joined the stable of horseman Rube Parker at North Randall after Parker became ill and was unable to train and race his horses. The stable included Adios, Scotland's Comet, and The Colonel's Lady. Not long after he began, Parker died, and Ervin inherited the horses, driving them to a series of wins.

In 1949, Ervin was the leading money-winning driver on the Grand Circuit, earning $179,771 during the 27-week season. His earnings were believed to be the highest single-season total ever recorded by a driver on the Grand Circuit at that time. His success in 1949 was largely driven by the performances of the horses Good Time and Our Time, both owned by William H. Cane. Ervin captured the first of his three Little Brown Jug victories in 1949 with Good Time. Under his direction, the horse became the first to win $50,000 during a single year of racing.

Ervin advanced to second place in the all-time standings for drivers with two-minute miles in 1954. His career total climbed to 37, surpassing Thomas W. Murphy, who had 35, while the record remained held by Sep Palin.

In 1959, he won the 34th Hambletonian Stakes with Diller Hanover, marking the first Hambletonian victory of his career after ten previous attempts. In the race, Ervin drove as a catch-driver for Ralph Baldwin's entry, while Baldwin personally drove Tie Silk.

On the verge of retiring from harness racing, the veteran driver took charge of Bret Hanover after the colt's purchase by Richard Downing in 1963. A training drive behind the horse persuaded him to continue racing. Ervin suffered serious injuries in 1964 after Bret Hanover became startled by a marching band during a warm-up at Lexington, Kentucky. He sustained a back injury and a detached kidney, and temporarily lost the use of his right leg. Despite doctors believing he might be permanently paralyzed, Ervin recovered and returned to racing after several weeks in a leg brace. He went on to win 35 races in a row. During the 1965 Little Brown Jug, Ervin captured both heats of the race with Bret Hanover at the Delaware County Fairgrounds. Victories in the Cane Pace and the Messenger Stakes that season made him the second driver to win the Pacing Triple Crown.

He drove Kerry Way to win the 1966 Hambletonian trotting title. The performance established a Hambletonian record for fillies and made Ervin the first driver in harness racing history to record 100 two-minute miles. Although hospitalized at the time, Ervin trained Speedy Streak, winner of the 1967 Hambletonian.

== Death ==
Frank Ervin died on September 30, 1991, in Winter Park, Florida, United States.

== Legacy ==
Ervin won the Little Brown Jug three times as a driver and a trainer, in 1949, 1953, and 1965, and in 1965 became the oldest winning driver in the race's history at age 61 years, 1 month, and 11 days. With victories in the Hambletonian Stakes in 1966 and 1967, he joined a select group of trainers who won the event in back-to-back years.

He was inducted into the United States Harness Racing Hall of Fame in 1969.
