= Ficken's Warehouse =

- U.S. National Register of Historic Places
- New Jersey Register of Historic Places
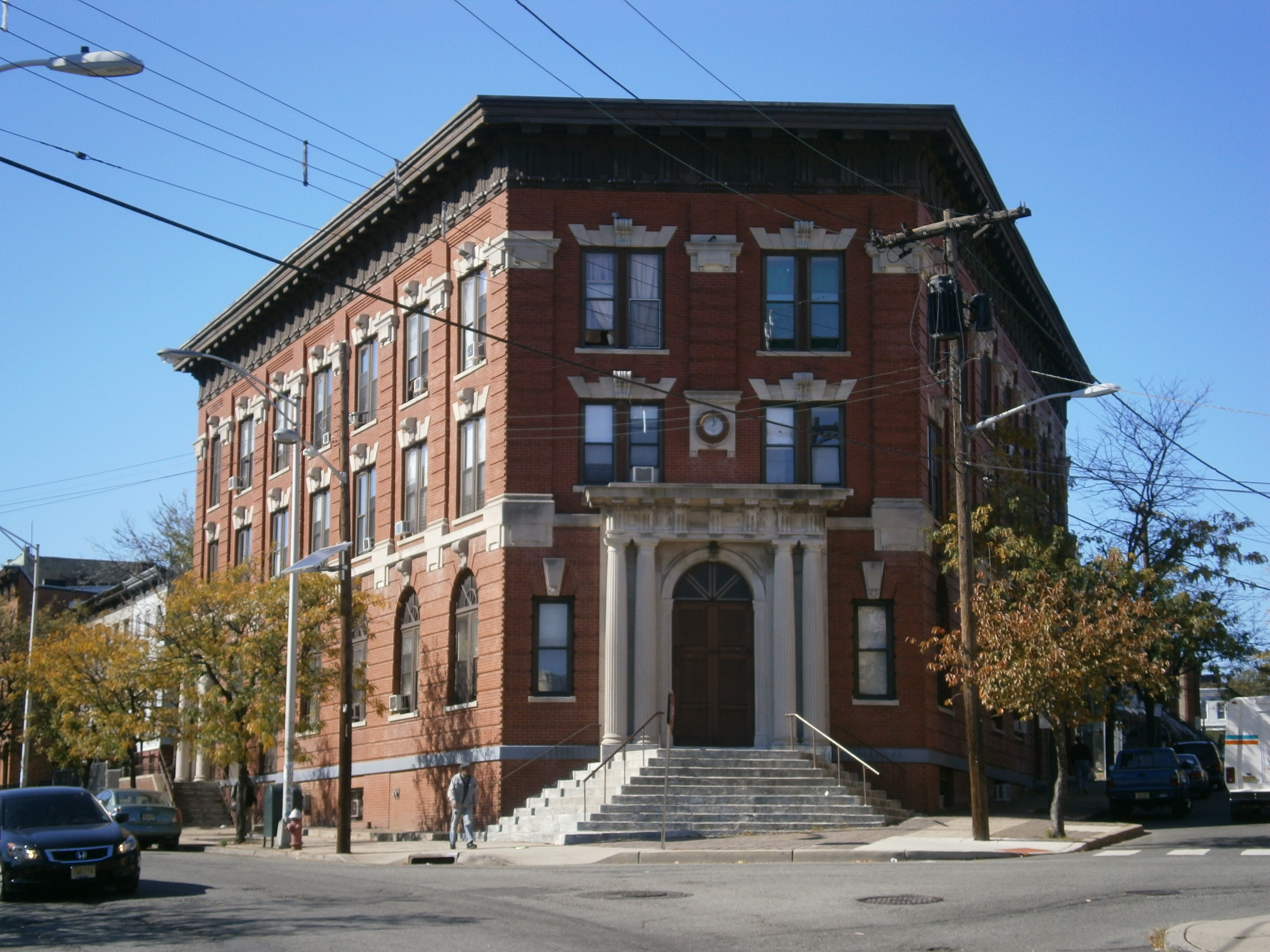

- Location within Hudson County, New Jersey Location within New Jersey Location within the United States
- Location: 750-766 Grand Street, Jersey City, New Jersey
- Coordinates: 40°42′55″N 74°4′12″W
- Area: 0.3 acres (0.12 ha)
- Built: 1910
- Architect: Ernest E. Quaife
- Architectural style: Classical Revival, Second Renaissance
- NRHP reference No.: 84002703
- NJRHP No.: 1501

Significant dates
- Added to NRHP: June 14, 1984
- Designated NJRHP: May 1, 1984

Ficken's Warehouse, is located in Bergen Hill, Jersey City, Hudson County, New Jersey, United States. The building was added to the National Register of Historic Places on June 14, 1984. The building was built in 1910 by John H. Fickens and used as a stable and warehouse. The building was later used as the Bergen Station Post Office for 50 years before being converted to residential use.

== See also ==
- National Register of Historic Places listings in Hudson County, New Jersey
- Bergen-Lafayette, Jersey City
