= Everybody Hurts (The Sopranos) =

- The Sopranos episode
- Episode no.: Season 4 Episode 6
- Directed by: Steve Buscemi
- Written by: Michael Imperioli
- Cinematography by: Alik Sakharov
- Production code: 406
- Original air date: October 20, 2002
- Running time: 55 minutes

Episode chronology
← Previous "Pie-O-My"	Next → "Watching Too Much Television"
- The Sopranos season 4

"Everybody Hurts" is the 45th episode of the HBO original series The Sopranos and the sixth of the show's fourth season. Written by Michael Imperioli and directed by Steve Buscemi, it originally aired on October 20, 2002.

== Starring ==
- James Gandolfini as Tony Soprano
- Lorraine Bracco as Jennifer Melfi
- Edie Falco as Carmela Soprano
- Michael Imperioli as Christopher Moltisanti
- Dominic Chianese as Corrado Soprano, Jr. *
- Steven Van Zandt as Silvio Dante *
- Tony Sirico as Paulie Gualtieri *
- Robert Iler as Anthony Soprano, Jr.
- Jamie-Lynn Sigler as Meadow Soprano
- Drea de Matteo as Adriana La Cerva
- Aida Turturro as Janice Soprano
- John Ventimiglia as Artie Bucco
- Kathrine Narducci as Charmaine Bucco
- Federico Castelluccio as Furio Giunta
- Joe Pantoliano as Ralph Cifaretto

* = credit only

=== Guest starring ===
- Jean-Hugues Anglade as Jean-Philippe Colbert
- Murielle Arden as Elodie Colbert
- Cameron Boyd as Matt Testa
- Paul Dano as Patrick Whalen
- Matthew Del Negro as Brian Cammarata
- Heidi Dippold as Janelle Cammarata
- Jessica Dunphy as Devin Pillsbury
- Joseph R. Gannascoli as Vito Spatafore
- Ryan Hoffman as Jason Malatesta
- Annabella Sciorra as Gloria Trillo
- Lauren Toub as Liz DiLiberto
- Tone Christensen as Miss Reykjavik

== Synopsis ==
Carmela tells Tony "that nice sales-lady" Gloria Trillo (his former mistress) has died by suicide. Tony goes to the car showroom to find out more, then furiously confronts Dr. Melfi, who explains that he should not blame her, or himself, for her death.

Plagued by guilt, Tony seeks ways to prove he is a good person and performs some generous acts for his friends and family. He signs a living trust for Carmela, in place of the one he refused to sign before. He then arranges for Brian Cammarata to be provided with discounted suits, then takes Janice out for a companionable dinner. He continues his good deeds with another dinner where Furio is introduced to a blind date arranged by Carmela. She smiles uneasily, seeing them get on well.

A.J.'s friends are curious about his family's lifestyle and drive him around town to try to find out his father's actual line of work. In the lavish home of his girlfriend Devin Pillsbury, A.J. is intimidated by her family's wealth. When his friends ask why his family does not have "Don Corleone money", he has no answer.

One evening, high on heroin, Christopher receives a call from Tony instructing him to meet in twenty minutes. Tony says that to limit his own exposure, he will be giving more of his orders through Christopher, who will help "take the family into the 21st century." Christopher feels deeply honored, but continues to take heroin.

Artie flirts with a new French hostess at Nuovo Vesuvio, Élodie. Her brother, Jean-Philippe, asks for a $50,000 bridge loan to conclude a deal to distribute Armagnac in the United States. Artie agrees to lend him the money at 15 percent interest. He tries to borrow the money from Ralphie, who declines but mentions it to Tony. Tony meets Artie, reminds him of their friendship, and insists he accept the loan from him at only 1.5 percent interest.

Ten days pass and Jean-Philippe is not answering his phone. Artie confronts him at his home. Jean-Philippe reveals the deal has failed and he does not have the money. Artie attacks him, but Jean-Philippe gains the upper hand, rips out his earring and throws him out. At home, Artie overdoses on alcohol and pills and calls Tony to apologize. Tony deduces that he is trying to kill himself and calls 911. At the hospital, Tony says Artie can clear his tab at Nuovo Vesuvio in lieu of payment. Artie expresses admiration that Tony could foresee the deal would inevitably sour and he would stand to profit from it; this observation infuriates Tony. Furio is sent by Tony to Jean-Philippe's apartment to collect the debt.

== First appearances ==
- Devin Pillsbury: A.J.'s girlfriend.
- Matt Testa: A.J.'s friend.

== Deceased ==
- Gloria Trillo: Tony learns of Gloria's suicide by hanging in this episode.

== Title reference ==
- The episode's title refers to the emotional difficulties faced by Tony, Adriana, Artie, Gloria, and Dr. Melfi. "Everybody Hurts" is also the title of a popular early-90s ballad by influential American rock band R.E.M.

== Cultural references ==
- The Beatles' Rubber Soul (1965) album is featured in one scene, wherein a mint copy was part of Devin's father's record collection.
- AJ's friends refer to The Godfather Part II and Don Vito Corleone several times.
- Artie says Charmaine won't be happy even if he had a restaurant empire like celebrity chef Bobby Flay.
- Devin's father has several Pablo Picasso paintings displayed in his home. AJ's friend Matt calls Devin's house very "Bo Peep"ish.
- Pillsbury is a flour and cake manufacturer. It is common for Italian Americans to refer to non-Italians as anything to do with dough, cake, or white bread.
- When Tony asks Janice if she knew anybody who committed suicide, she responded with “I used to live in Seattle, Tony”, a reference to the suicide of American musician and Nirvana frontman Kurt Cobain, who was primarily associated with the Seattle grunge scene.

== Music ==
The episode features the following music:

- Armand Van Helden's "Kentucky Fried Flow" is played when Christopher and his friend are seen in a bathroom and his friend is vomiting, while Christopher is looking in the mirror after shooting heroin.
- Weezer's "Island in the Sun" is played during the conversation between Carmela and Adriana at the gym.
- "I Only Have Eyes For You", by The Flamingos, is played in the scene where Tony has dinner with Janice.
- D'Angelo's "Untitled (How Does It Feel)" is playing when A.J. and Devin are making out on the couch in the Soprano home.
- The Aquatones's "You" plays as Tony dreams about Gloria.
- "Ballin' Out Of Control" – Jermaine Dupri, featuring Nate Dogg.
- Manu Dibango's "Em'Ma" is playing as Artie confronts Jean-Philippe about his money.
- "Tout doucement" by Bibie is playing while Artie takes pills and drinks armagnac.
- Billy Joel's "Scenes from an Italian Restaurant" is played in a scene near the end, where Tony, Carmela, and their guests have a meal at an Italian restaurant, presumably following the Billy Joel concert.
- The song played over the end credits is "Take Me for a Little While" by The Royal Jesters.
