= Fox Stake =

American harness race for two-year-old pacers

- Class: Grand Circuit
- Location: Indiana State Fairgrounds; Indianapolis, Indiana, U.S.
- Inaugurated: 1927
- Race type: Standardbred / Harness
- Website: www.hambletonian.com/upcomingstakes/fox

Race information
- Distance: 1 mile
- Surface: Dirt
- Track: Left-handed
- Qualification: Two-year-old pacers

The Fox Stake is an American harness racing event for two-year-old Standardbred pacers held at the Indiana State Fairgrounds in Indianapolis, Indiana. Established in 1927, the race developed into one of the leading events for juvenile pacers.

== History ==
In 1926, Indianapolis horseman Frank P. Fox offered $5,000 toward establishing a major purse for pacers. Although the offer was not accepted, Fred Terry, owner of The Horseman and Fair World, later established the Frank P. Fox Stake in his honor. The Fox Stake was inaugurated in 1927 as a race for two-year-old pacers with a purse of $14,887.63. Red Pluto won the inaugural Fox Stake with Sep Palin in the sulky.

During its early years, the race quickly became an important event for young pacers. The first six runnings distributed a combined $61,952.30 in purses. Early winners included Red Pluto, Baron Hall, Capital Stock, Corporal Lee, Calumet Cheater, and Logan Scott.

Most of the early runnings were held at the Indiana State Fair. The race was affected by the financial difficulties of the Great Depression, as horsemen struggled to maintain their stake payments. By 1933, its purse had fallen to as little as $3,300. The race moved to Syracuse, New York, for the 1933 running. The event later recovered, and in 1938 a companion race for two-year-old trotters, the Horseman Stake, was established. In 1942, the Fox Stake was transferred from Indianapolis to Saratoga Springs, New York, after the United States Army took over the Indiana State Fairgrounds. The race's appearance at Saratoga marked its first running in the eastern United States. All but four editions of the Fox Stake had been held at the Indiana State Fairgrounds by 1950.

The Fox Stake, Horseman Stake, and related futurities were eventually sold by Fred Terry's son, Bob Terry, to the Indiana State Fair Board during the mid-1950s.

By 1966, the Fox Stake carried a total purse of $61,718.75, then the largest in the event's history, surpassing the $58,559.95 offered the previous year.

The race's most accomplished winners have included Good Time, Torpid, Bret Hanover, and Albatross, all of whom later received Harness Horse of the Year honors. Bret Hanover captured the 1964 Fox Stake during an undefeated two-year-old season in which he won all 24 of his starts. Albatross later won the Fox Stake during his two-year-old campaign. The race remained a major prize through the later 20th century. In 1974, Alert Bret won a $100,000 edition of the stake, while Jate Lobell captured the event during his undefeated two-year-old season in 1986.

The 49th running in 1975 marked the first time the Fox Stake was televised. The Fox Stake held its 100th running in August 2026. Another Mile Again, driven by Trace Tetrick, won the race in 1:54.3.

The race is part of the Grand Circuit program at the Indiana State Fair. It is owned and sponsored by the Indiana State Fair and serviced by the Hambletonian Society.

== Locations ==
- 1927–1932: Indiana State Fairgrounds, Indianapolis, Indiana, U.S.
- 1933–1934: New York State Fairgrounds, Syracuse, New York, U.S.
- 1935–1941: Indiana State Fairgrounds, Indianapolis, Indiana, U.S.
- 1942: Saratoga Raceway, Saratoga Springs, New York, U.S.
- 1943–1945: Darke County Fairgrounds, Greenville, Ohio, U.S.
- 1946–present: Indiana State Fairgrounds, Indianapolis, Indiana, U.S.

== Fox Stake winners ==
Fox Stake winners (1927–1950)
Year	Winner	Driver	Fastest heat	Purse
1927	Red Pluto	Sep Palin	2:06	$14,887.63
1928	Baron Hall	John Case	2:09 1/2	$11,841.62
1929	Capital Stock	W. J. Hodson	2:06 1/2	$11,996.60
1930	Corporal Lee	Lyman Bruse	2:06 1/2	$8,568.94
1931	Calumet Cheater	Thomas S. Berry	2:02 1/2	$8,352.38
1932	Logan Scott	W. Britenfield	2:02	$6,447.79
1933	Laurel Hanover	Thomas S. Berry	2:08	$3,325.69
1934	The Auctioneer	Sep Palin	2:12 1/2	$4,303.34
1935	Worthy Grattan	Warren Dennis	2:04 1/2	$7,076.30
1936	Dusty Hanover	Henry Thomas	2:04	$9,051.06
1937	The Widower	Vic Fleming	2:05 1/2	$9,450.25
1938	Blackstone	Hugh M. Parshall	2:05	$10,495.00
1939	William Cash	W. Britenfield	2:04	$11,980.00
1940	Blackhawk	Delvin Miller	2:03 1/4	$14,920.00
1941	Court Jester	Rupert Parker	2:04 1/4	$16,965.00
1942	Adios	Rupert Parker	2:05 1/4	$16,240.00
1943	Attorney	Ernest Smith	2:06 1/4	$12,703.46
1944	True Chief	Thomas S. Berry	2:06 1/2	$15,690.76
1945	Ensign Hanover	Sep Palin	2:09 1/2	$19,651.95
1946	Popular Byrd	Thomas S. Berry	2:02	$20,585.71
1947	Knight Dream	Franklin Safford	2:01 2/5	$29,019.12
1948	Good Time	Frank Ervin	2:03 2/5	$32,159.37
1949	Our Time	Frank Ervin	2:03 2/5	$29,358.80
1950	Solicitor	Delvin Miller	2:03 3/5	$33,477.92
