= Good Time (horse) =

American Standardbred pacer (1946–1977)

- Breed: Standardbred
- Sire: Hal Dale
- Grandsire: Abbedale
- Dam: On Time
- Damsire: Volomite
- Sex: Stallion
- Foaled: 1946
- Country: United States
- Colour: Bay
- Breeder: William H. Cane
- Owner: William H. Cane
- Trainer: Frank Ervin
- Earnings: $318,792

Major wins
- Standardbred Stakes (1948); Fox Stake (1948); Matron Stake (1949); Little Brown Jug (1949); Western Pace (1949); Good Time Pace (1950); U.S. Harness Writers Pace (1952)

Awards
- American Harness Horse of the Year (1949, 1952)

Honours
- United States Harness Racing Hall of Fame (1978)

Good Time (1946–1977) was an American Standardbred pacer who was twice named American Harness Horse of the Year, receiving the honor in 1949 and 1952. Bred and owned by William H. Cane, he was trained and driven by Frank Ervin. Good Time won the Little Brown Jug as a three-year-old in 1949 and later became a leading free-for-all pacer.

== Background ==
Good Time was a bay stallion foaled in 1946. He was by Hal Dale out of On Time, a daughter of Volomite. His sire was an influential pacing stallion whose other offspring included Adios and Keystoner. Good Time was bred by harness racing owner William H. Cane, who operated the Good Time Stable in Goshen, New York. Small for a Standardbred, Good Time stood only about fourteen hands high.

== Racing career ==
=== Two-year-old season ===
Good Time raced at two years old in 1948 under the direction of trainer-driver Frank Ervin. Among his early victories was the Standardbred, a race for two-year-old pacing colts, which he won in 2:06.1 for the Good Time Stable. He also won that year's American National Stake, McMahon Memorial, The B. P. O. E., and Fox Stake. He finished the 1948 season with earnings of $46,433.13.

=== Three-year-old season ===
Good Time emerged as one of the leading horses in American harness racing during his three-year-old campaign in 1949. He won 15 of 19 starts, with two second-place finishes and one third. One of his major victories came in the 1949 Little Brown Jug at Delaware County Fairgrounds racetrack. With Ervin both training and driving, Good Time won with a winning time of 2:03.2.

Good Time closed his season in California, where he won the $15,700 Western Pace at Hollywood Park in 1:59.2. The performance was reported as the fastest competitive mile paced in California to that point. The victory increased his career earnings to $105,198, then the highest total recorded by a three-year-old harness horse.

=== Later racing career ===
Good Time continued racing against older pacers following his three-year-old season. At Yonkers Raceway in 1950, he won the inaugural Good Time Pace, an event named in his honor. Contested over a mile and a half, the race was won by Good Time in 3:08.

His most successful campaign came as a six-year-old in 1952. Good Time won 23 of 33 starts during the year, with three second-place finishes and two thirds. Among his victories was the $10,000 U.S. Harness Writers Pace in July 1952.

Good Time made his final racing appearance at Yonkers Raceway in October 1952. He paced the mile in 2:01, setting a track record and lowering the previous mark by a full second. He earned $6,750, increasing his career earnings to $318,792.86. He set eight track records during the season, along with a world record at a mile and a quarter.

== Stud record ==
Following his retirement from racing, Good Time entered stud. He stood at Castleton Farm in Lexington, Kentucky, where he became an influential pacing sire. Good Time's first crop raced in 1956, beginning a long run of successful offspring. Following the death of his owner W. H. Cane in 1957, he was offered at the Tattersalls sale at Keeneland, where a bid of $116,000 was received for him. Castleton Farm, which had Good Time under lease, was given the option to match the bid. He was eventually acquired by Castleton Farm, Percy and Jere Gray, and trainer Frank Ervin. His success at stud led to strong demand, with breeders paying $1,500 per mare for his services.

Good Time sired 22 crops before being withdrawn from public stud service in 1975. By the time of his death, 83 of his offspring had paced miles in two minutes or faster. Good Time also became influential through his daughters. He was the damsire of Most Happy Fella, the 1970 Pacing Triple Crown winner who later became one of the sport's leading sires.

== Death ==
Good Time died at Castleton Farm in Lexington, Kentucky, United States, on May 14, 1977 at the age of 31.

== Legacy ==
At the end of the 1949 season, Good Time was selected as the American Harness Horse of the Year. He was the first pacer to be named Harness Horse of the Year and the first three-year-old to receive the award. His campaign in 1952 earned him a second Harness Horse of the Year title, making him the first horse to receive the award twice. By the time he retired in 1952, he was the highest-earning Standardbred to that point, with career earnings of $318,792.

He was elected to the United States Harness Racing Hall of Fame as an Immortal in 1978.
