= St. John's Episcopal Church (Jersey City, New Jersey) =

Church building in Jersey City, New Jersey

Coordinates: 40.7194°N 74.0670°W

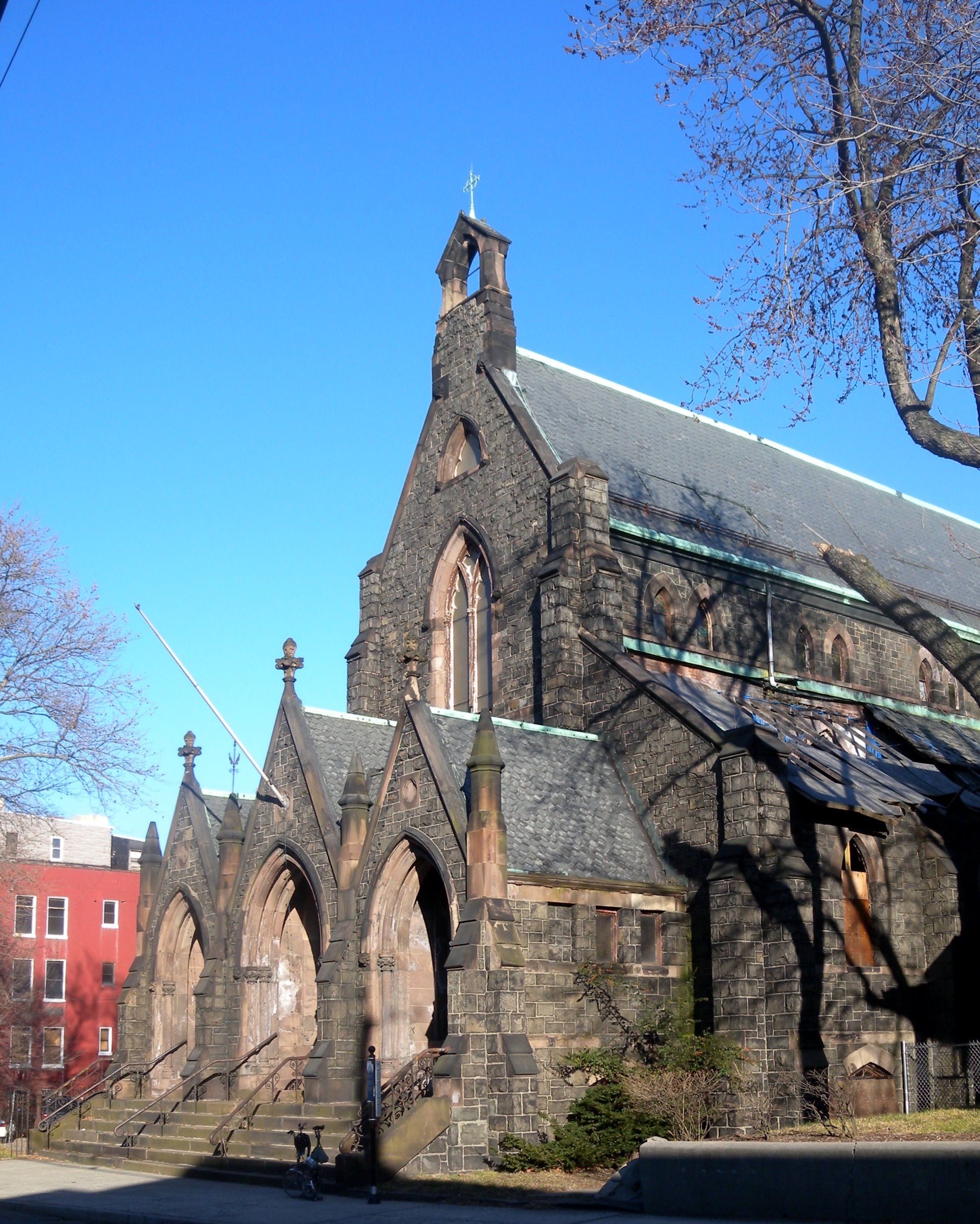

Saint John's Episcopal Church in Jersey City, New Jersey is a disused church of the Episcopal Diocese of Newark. Located on Summit Avenue in Bergen Hill, it is considered a masterwork of 19th-century ecclesiastical architecture. The building, which was named a municipal landmark in 2013, has not housed a congregation since 1994, and has fallen into disrepair. There are proposals to convert the buildings on the grounds to housing.

== History ==
Erected in 1870, the Gothic Revival-influenced building was designed by John Remson Onderdonk, a local architect and practitioner of the ecclesiological philosophy, and is considered to be a masterpiece of 19th-century ecclesiastic architecture by the city's landmarks conservancy. Its façade replicates a portion of the Chartres Cathedral in Southern France.

It once housed the largest Episcopal congregation in New Jersey, its members included many of the leading citizens of Jersey City. It was called the "Millionaire's Church". In 1914, much of the church was damaged by fire, but was elaborately restored. By the mid-twentieth century, reflecting the demographic change in the city, its congregation became more working class. From 1960 to 1968 the church was a center of the civil rights and anti-Vietnam war movements during the rectorship of the Reverend Robert W. Castle who preached a social gospel and drew attention to the plight of the city's poor.

The church has not housed an Episcopal congregation since 1994.

== Historic designation ==
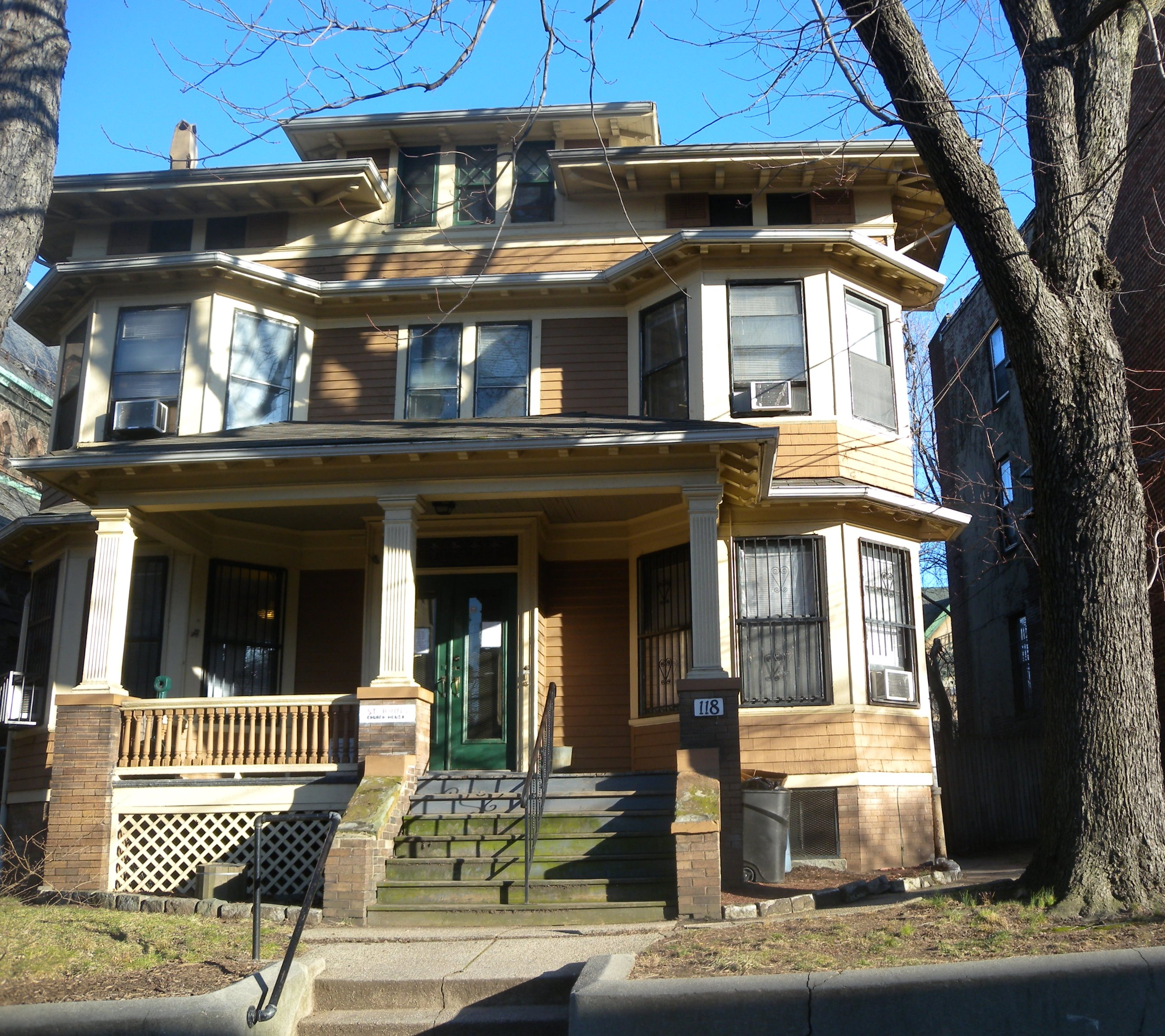
Parish House

The Bergen Hill Historic District, of which the church is a contributing property, was established as a municipal historic district in 1986 and identified in New Jersey's state historic preservation office (SHPO) in 1989/1991 (ID#1481). In 2008, the SHPO issued a certificate of eligibility (ID#4986) for listing individually on both the New Jersey Register of Historic Places and the National Register of Historic Places. Attempts made in 2007/2008 to have the church designated a local landmark were unsuccessful, the motion having been tabled by the Jersey City City Council. When it appeared that the diocese was moving to demolish the building, a campaign was begun to convince the city council to re-visit the issue which it did in June 2013 and adopted a measure granting landmark status.

== Preservation and demolition controversy ==
St. John's has not been in regular use since 1994. In 2004 Preservation New Jersey named St. John's one of the most endangered historic sites in the state. There is concern that if the building continues to deteriorate it will be necessary for it to be demolished. The Jersey Landmarks Conservancy, a preservation group, believes that the Diocese of Newark has intentionally neglected the building in order to demolish it. The stained glass windows, altar, and other items were removed in 1997. In January 2012, the church's altar was offered for sale on eBay. The diocese maintains that the preservation of the building is too costly and that no serious offers to purchase it have been forthcoming.

In March 2013 the City of Jersey City served the diocese a Notice of Unsafe Structure, after which it contracted an asbestos abatement work and applied for a permit for demolition. Its designation as a local landmark requires that special approval be given before the building can be razed. The diocese disagrees with the landmarking. In 2015 it was decided to convert the property to residential spaces, including construction of new buildings and conversion of the church.

== See also ==
- National Register of Historic Places listings in Hudson County, New Jersey
- St. Patrick's Parish and Buildings
