= Pie-O-My =

- The Sopranos episode
- Episode no.: Season 4 Episode 5
- Directed by: Henry J. Bronchtein
- Written by: Robin Green; Mitchell Burgess
- Cinematography by: Alik Sakharov
- Production code: 405
- Original air date: October 13, 2002
- Running time: 54 minutes

Episode chronology
← Previous "The Weight"	Next → "Everybody Hurts"
- The Sopranos season 4

"Pie-O-My" is the 44th episode of the HBO original series The Sopranos and the fifth of the show's fourth season. Written by Robin Green and Mitchell Burgess, and directed by Henry J. Bronchtein, it originally aired on October 13, 2002.

== Starring ==
- James Gandolfini as Tony Soprano
- Lorraine Bracco as Dr. Jennifer Melfi *
- Edie Falco as Carmela Soprano
- Michael Imperioli as Christopher Moltisanti
- Dominic Chianese as Corrado Soprano, Jr.
- Steven Van Zandt as Silvio Dante
- Tony Sirico as Paulie Gualtieri *
- Robert Iler as Anthony Soprano, Jr. *
- Jamie-Lynn Sigler as Meadow Soprano *
- Drea de Matteo as Adriana La Cerva
- Aida Turturro as Janice Soprano
- Federico Castelluccio as Furio Giunta
- Steven R. Schirripa as Bobby Baccalieri
- and Joe Pantoliano as Ralph Cifaretto

* = credit only

=== Guest starring ===
- Jerry Adler as Hesh Rabkin

==== Also guest starring ====
- Matthew Del Negro as Brian Cammarata
- Robert Funaro as Eugene Pontecorvo
- Joseph R. Gannascoli as Vito Spatafore
- Lola Glaudini as Agent Deborah Ciccerone
- Dan Grimaldi as Patsy Parisi
- Arthur J. Nascarella as Carlo Gervasi
- Richard Portnow as Harold Melvoin
- Michele Santopietro as JoJo Palmice
- Matt Servitto as Agent Harris
- Karen Young as Agent Sanseverino
- Angelo Massagli as Bobby Baccalieri III
- Lexie Sperduto as Sophia Baccalieri
- Stewart J. Zully as Alan Ginsberg
- Val Bisoglio as Murf Lupo
- David Copeland as Joey Cogo
- Manon Halliburton as Lois Pettit, the horse trainer
- Aaron Gryder as jockey

== Synopsis ==
Adriana realizes that her club is not entirely hers, as the back rooms are freely used by Tony and his crew for business, and running up the tab with seemingly no intention of settling it. Her FBI handlers, including her new contact Robyn Sanseverino, are pressing her for information. They tell her that Christopher is associating with dangerous criminals, and she can help him; they also cause her to doubt that Richie and Pussy are in witness protection. She gives away a little information about Patsy. At home, she relieves stress with heroin.

Janice is inserting herself into Bobby's family life: she freezes out Mikey Palmice's widow JoJo, and serves the family Carmela's delicious lasagna, claiming it as her own. She urges Bobby to get over his grief as he might lose Junior's support. Bobby pulls himself together and completes a neglected task for Junior: meeting with a union shop steward to intimidate him into changing his vote in an upcoming election.

Tony and Carmela are still bitterly divided about their investments. He refuses to sign the life insurance trust she proposes, having been advised it is too much in her favor. She receives a stock tip, but when he comes up with the money, it is too late.

Ralphie's racehorse, Pie-O-My, wins and he happily shares the winnings with Tony, who demands a bigger share for the next race, to Ralphie's chagrin. Veterinarian's fees pile up, and one night when Pie-O-My is very sick, the vet refuses further treatment unless he is paid. Ralphie refuses and passes along Tony's number, and he rushes to the stables and pays. He then goes into the stall and sits with Pie-O-My, gently petting and reassuring her.

== First appearances ==
- Agent Robyn Sanseverino: The F.B.I. agent assigned to handle Adriana.

== Title ==
- The episode's title is the name of Ralph's racehorse, Pie-O-My. The name is a play on the defunct Py-O-My Baking Mix Company, operated for some years by the Weinberg family.

== References to other media or events ==
- At the stables, Hesh mentions Seabiscuit, a frequent pop culture reference since the publication of a popular 1999 book about the horse. The episode aired before the release of the 2003 motion picture of the same name.
- Adriana sees a Body by Jake infomercial on television.
- While discussing the trust Carmela is trying to set up, Tony says, "floats like a butterfly, stings like a bee", a reference to Muhammad Ali.
- When Junior is putting on his sweater, he says “It's a beautiful day in this neighborhood”, a reference to Mister Rogers’ Neighborhood.

== Music ==
- The song played over the end credits is "My Rifle, My Pony and Me" by Dean Martin and Ricky Nelson. It appears in a scene from 1959's Rio Bravo that Tony watches in the Season Four premiere, "For All Debts Public and Private".
- The song heard from A.J.'s room when Tony is in bed is "The Gift That Keeps On Giving" by Deicide from their album Insineratehymn.
- Snake River Conspiracy's cover of The Cure's "Lovesong" plays in the Crazy Horse club.
- The song played when Bobby goes into Dorley's Lounge to speak with Teddy about the union vote is "Theme for an Imaginary Western" by Mountain.
- The song playing in the Crazy Horse club when Adrianna walks in on Tony and Ralph in her office is "Can't Stand It" by The Greenhornes.
