= Were You Always an Italian? =

Memoir by Maria Laurino

- Author: Maria Laurino
- Publisher: W.W. Norton & Company
- Publication date: 2000
- ISBN: 9780393049305

Were You Always an Italian? is a memoir written by American author Maria Laurino and published by W.W. Norton in 2000. It was a national bestseller and its chapters have been widely anthologized including in the Norton Reader, the Italian American Reader, Don't Tell Mama!, and Crossing Cultures. Were You Always an Italian? is an examination of third generation ethnic identity. Among the topics the book explores are the stereotypes bedeviling Italian-Americans, the clashing aesthetics of Italian designers, and the etymology of southern Italian dialect words like stunod and cafone. The title was based on a question posed to Maria Laurino by former New York Governor Mario Cuomo.

== Chapters ==
1. Beginnings
2. Scents
3. Tainted Soil
4. Clothes
5. Rome
6. Words
7. Bensonhurst
8. Faith
9. Ancestors
10. Beginnings
