= St. Patrick's Parish and Buildings =

Historic church in New Jersey, United States

- U.S. National Register of Historic Places
- New Jersey Register of Historic Places
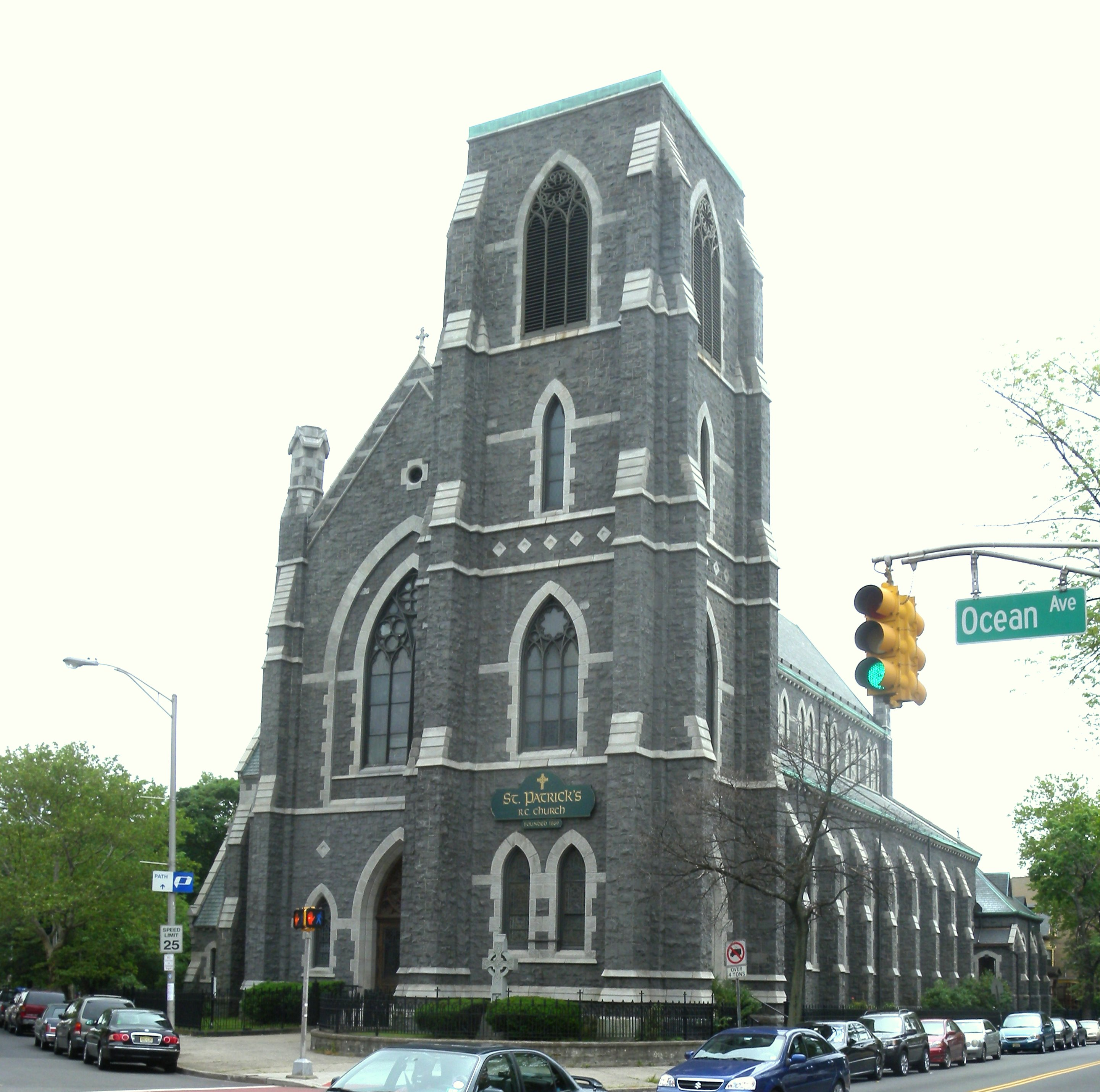

- Location within Hudson County, New Jersey Location within New Jersey Location within the United States
- Location: Grand Street, Ocean and Bramhall Avenues, Jersey City, New Jersey
- Coordinates: 40°42′50″N 74°4′23″W
- Area: 3 acres (1.2 ha)
- Built: 1868
- Architect: Keely, Patrick C.
- Architectural style: Late 19th And 20th Century Revivals, Second Empire, Gothic
- NRHP reference No.: 80002489
- NJRHP No.: 1530

Significant dates
- Added to NRHP: September 17, 1980
- Designated NJRHP: March 17, 1980

St. Patrick's Parish and Buildings is a historic church on Grand Street, Ocean and Bramhall avenues in Jersey City, Hudson County, New Jersey, United States. It was built in 1868 and added to the National Register of Historic Places in 1980. The stained glass windows in the church were destroyed in the Black Tom explosion of 1916.

The church appears in the HBO crime drama The Sopranos four times, standing in for fictional St. Elzear's Church in Newark in the pilot, season three's "Another Toothpick," season four's "Watching Too Much Television," and season six's "The Ride."

== See also ==
- National Register of Historic Places listings in Hudson County, New Jersey
- Bergen Hill, Jersey City
- St. John's Episcopal Church (Jersey City, New Jersey)
