= Lincoln High School (New Jersey) =

High school in Jersey City, New Jersey, United States

Academy of Governance and Social Sciences at Lincoln High School
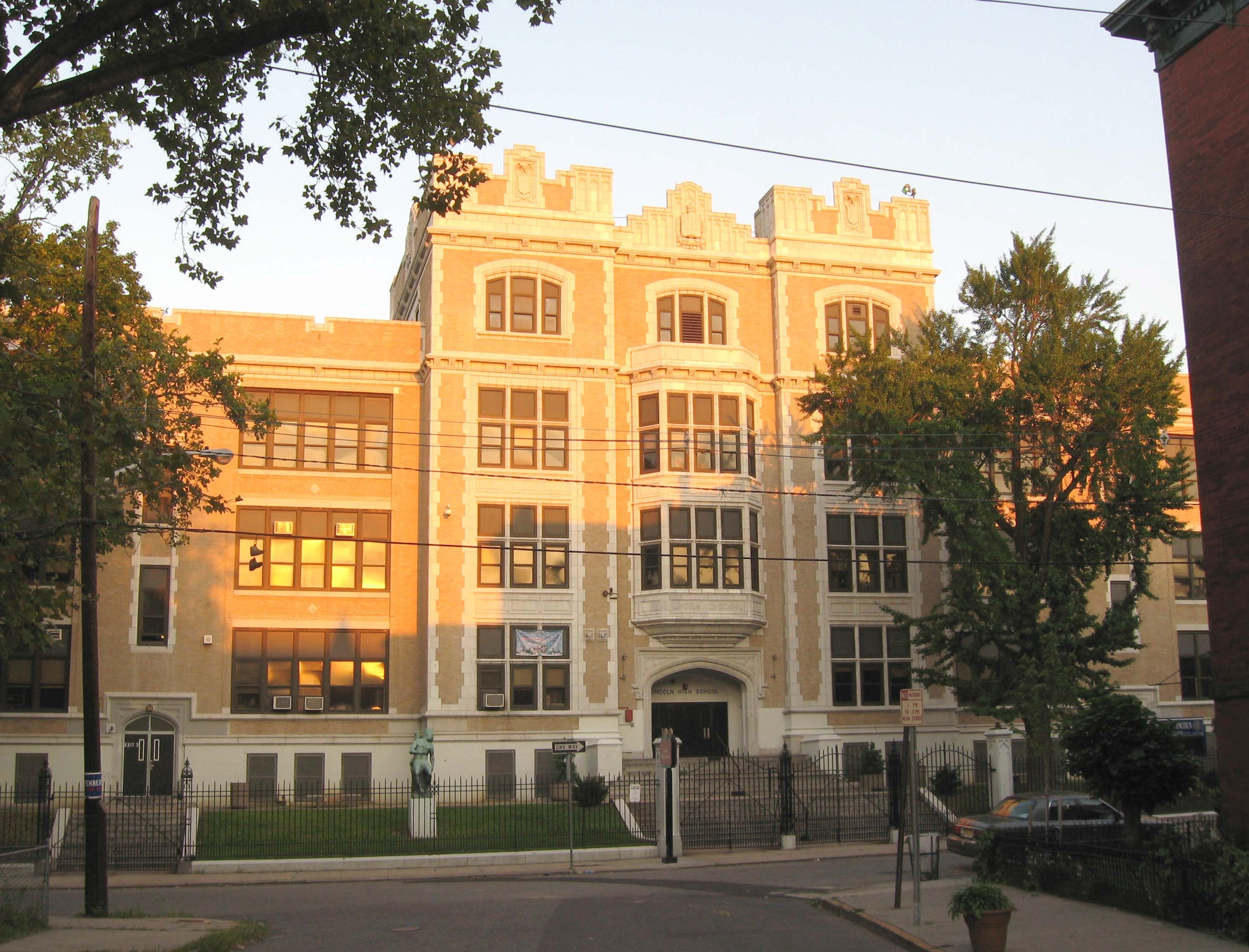

Location
- 60 Crescent Avenue; Jersey City, Hudson County, New Jersey 07304; United States
- 40.717363°N 74.070515°W

Information
- Type: Public high school
- Established: 1913
- School district: Jersey City Public Schools
- NCES School ID: 340783002776
- Principal: Chris Gadsden
- Faculty: 60.5 FTEs
- Grades: 9-12
- Enrollment: 767 (as of 2024–25)
- Student to teacher ratio: 12.7:1
- Colors: Royal blue and white
- Athletics conference: Hudson County Interscholastic League (general); North Jersey Super Football Conference (football)
- Team name: Lions
- Accreditation: Middle States Association of Colleges and Schools
- Website: alhs.jcboe.org

Lincoln High School Academy of Governance and Social Sciences (or simply Lincoln High School) is a four-year public high school located in Jersey City, in Hudson County, in the U.S. state of New Jersey, operated as part of the Jersey City Public Schools, serving students in ninth through twelfth grade.

As of the 2024–25 school year, the school had an enrollment of 767 students and 60.5 classroom teachers (on an FTE basis), for a student–teacher ratio of 12.7:1. There were 554 students (72.2% of enrollment) eligible for free lunch and 26 (3.4% of students) eligible for reduced-cost lunch.

The school has been accredited by the Middle States Association of Colleges and Schools Commission on Elementary and Secondary Schools since 1928 and the school's accreditation expires in July 2025.

== Awards, recognition and rankings ==
The school was the 328th-ranked public high school in New Jersey out of 339 schools statewide in New Jersey Monthly magazine's September 2014 cover story on the state's "Top Public High Schools", using a new ranking methodology. The school had been ranked 294th in the state of 328 schools in 2012, after being ranked 305th in 2010 out of 322 schools listed. The magazine ranked the school 291st in 2008 out of 316 schools. The school was ranked 279th in the magazine's September 2006 issue, which surveyed 316 schools across the state.

Schooldigger.com ranked the school 342nd out of 409 public high schools statewide in its 2014 rankings that were based on the combined percentage of students classified as proficient or above proficient on the language arts literacy and mathematics components of the High School Proficiency Assessment (HSPA).

== History ==
The original Lincoln High School opened in 1913, with an inaugural student body of 300 on a site acquired from the Hasbrouck Institute, a private school. The city's second public high school, it was intended to address the growth in enrollment at present-day William L. Dickinson High School. In January 1916, the school graduated its first class of 32 students. In 1934, the school had an enrollment of 5,000 students, making it the second largest in the state.

Lincoln is located at 60 Crescent Avenue south of Journal Square in Bergen Hill, on the site of a mansion that had been owned by George Theodore Werts, who served as Governor of New Jersey from 1893 to 1896.

== Athletics ==
The Lincoln High School Lions compete in the Hudson County Interscholastic League, which is comprised of public and private high schools in Hudson County. The league operates under the supervision of the New Jersey State Interscholastic Athletic Association (NJSIAA). With 493 students in grades 10–12, the school was classified by the NJSIAA for the 2019–20 school year as Group II for most athletic competition purposes, which included schools with an enrollment of 486 to 758 students in that grade range. The football team competes in the National Red division of the North Jersey Super Football Conference, which includes 112 schools competing in 20 divisions, making it the nation's biggest football-only high school sports league. The school's co-op team with Palisades Park High School was classified by the NJSIAA as Group IV North for football for 2024–2026, which included schools with 893 to 1,315 students.

The boys track team won the public school indoor track state championship in 1940 and 1948, won the Group II title in 1969 and won the Group III title in 1970, 1971 (as co-champion), 1974; the program's seven state titles are tied for ninth in the state. The girls team was the all-group co-champion in 1979.

The boys' track team won the Group IV spring / outdoor track state championship in 1941 and won the Group II title in 1970.

The boys' track team won the Group III indoor relay championships in 1967, 1968 and 1969, won in the combined Group I/II in 1970 and 1974, and won in Group III in 1976. The six state championships are tied for seventh-most among the state's high schools.

The 1981 football team finished the season with a 9–2 record after winning the NJSIAA North I Group III state sectional title with a 22–14 victory against Lakeland Regional High School in the championship game. In 2009 the Lions finished the season at 8–2, losing in the first round of the NJSIAA North II Group I state playoffs. In 2010, the Lions built on their wave of success, going 7-2 during the regular season, the Lions went back to the playoffs. Their regular season highlight was erasing an 18–0 deficit to Hoboken High School to win 42–18. In the 2010 NJSIAA North II Group I playoffs, the Lions defeated Glen Ridge High School 36–19, and Jonathan Dayton High School 42-14 all on the road to advance to the North II Group I sectional championship game against New Providence High School, losing by a score of 21–8 at New Meadowlands Stadium. The Lions went on to the NJSIAA state championship final losing by a score 36-28 vs. Mountain Lakes High School in 2014 in the North II Group II final and lost 28-26 vs. Raritan High School in 2015 on a touchdown scored with seconds left in the Central Jersey Group II finals. the head coach of the Lincoln Lions is Robert Hampton, who has been the team's coach since the 2005–06 season.

The boys' basketball team won the North I, Group III state sectional championship in 2002 with a 50–41 win against Sparta High School in the tournament final. The 2006–07 team won the HCIAA championship over now defunct Union Hill High School, winning by a score of 50–46. The 2008 team won the North II, Group II state sectional title with a 61–58 win over Orange High School in the tournament final. In 2008, the basketball team went on to win the school's first Group II state title with an 88–70 victory against Collingswood High School.

The girls' basketball team won the North II Group II sectional championship in 2019, becoming the first public school team for Jersey City to win a sectional title, with a 43–41 win over Secaucus High School. The team was declared as the North II regional champion in 2020, after the finals were cancelled due to COVID.

== Administration ==
The school's principal is Chris Gadsden. Core members of the school's administration team include three vice principals.

== Notable alumni ==
- Doris Jean Austin (1949–1994), author and journalist
- Joe Budden (born 1980), recording artist
- Robert Burns (1926–2016), politician who represented the 38th Legislative District in the New Jersey General Assembly from
- Kathleen Collins (1942–1988, class of 1959), poet, playwright, writer, filmmaker, director, civil rights activist and educator
- Frank Darby (born 1997, class of 2016), American football wide receiver who played for the St. Louis Battlehawks
- Florence S. Gaynor (1920–1993), first black woman to head a major teaching hospital in the United States
- Frank J. Guarini (1924–2026, class of 1942), politician who represented New Jersey's 14th congressional district from 1979 to 1993
- Valerie Harper (1939–2019), actress who starred in Rhoda, a spinoff of her role as Rhoda Morgenstern on The Mary Tyler Moore Show
- Johnny Macknowski (1923–2024), former basketball player who played for the Syracuse Nationals
- Demie Mainieri (1928–2019), college baseball head coach who was the first junior college coach to win 1,000 career games
- Charles Mays (1941–2005), Olympic athlete who competed in the long jump at the 1968 Summer Olympics and politician who represented the 31st Legislative District in the New Jersey General Assembly
- Brandon McGowan (born 1983), safety who played in the NFL for the New England Patriots
- Phyllis Newman (1933–2019), actress and singer
- Bernie Parmalee (born 1967), former NFL running back who played for the Miami Dolphins and New York Jets
- Andy Stanfield (1927–1985), sprinter, who was an Olympic gold and silver medallist
- Philip Van Doren Stern (1900–1984), author, editor and Civil War historian whose story The Greatest Gift, published in 1943, inspired the classic Christmas film It's a Wonderful Life (1946)
- Aron Stewart (born 1950), former basketball player
- George Tardiff (1936–2012), football head coach at Benedictine College and Washburn University
- Dennis "Dee Tee" Thomas (1951–2021), alto saxophone player, flautist and percussionist, who was a founding member of Kool & the Gang
- Joseph W. Tumulty (1914–1996), attorney and politician who represented the 32nd Legislative District for a single four-year term in the New Jersey Senate
- Elnardo Webster (1948–2022), former professional basketball player who played in the American Basketball Association for the New York Nets and Memphis Pros during the 1971–1972 season
- Larry Wilde (1928–2023), actor, comedian, motivational speaker, university instructor and publisher
- Elijah Williams (born 2002, class of 2020), NFL defensive lineman for the Minnesota Vikings
