= For All Debts Public and Private =

- The Sopranos episode
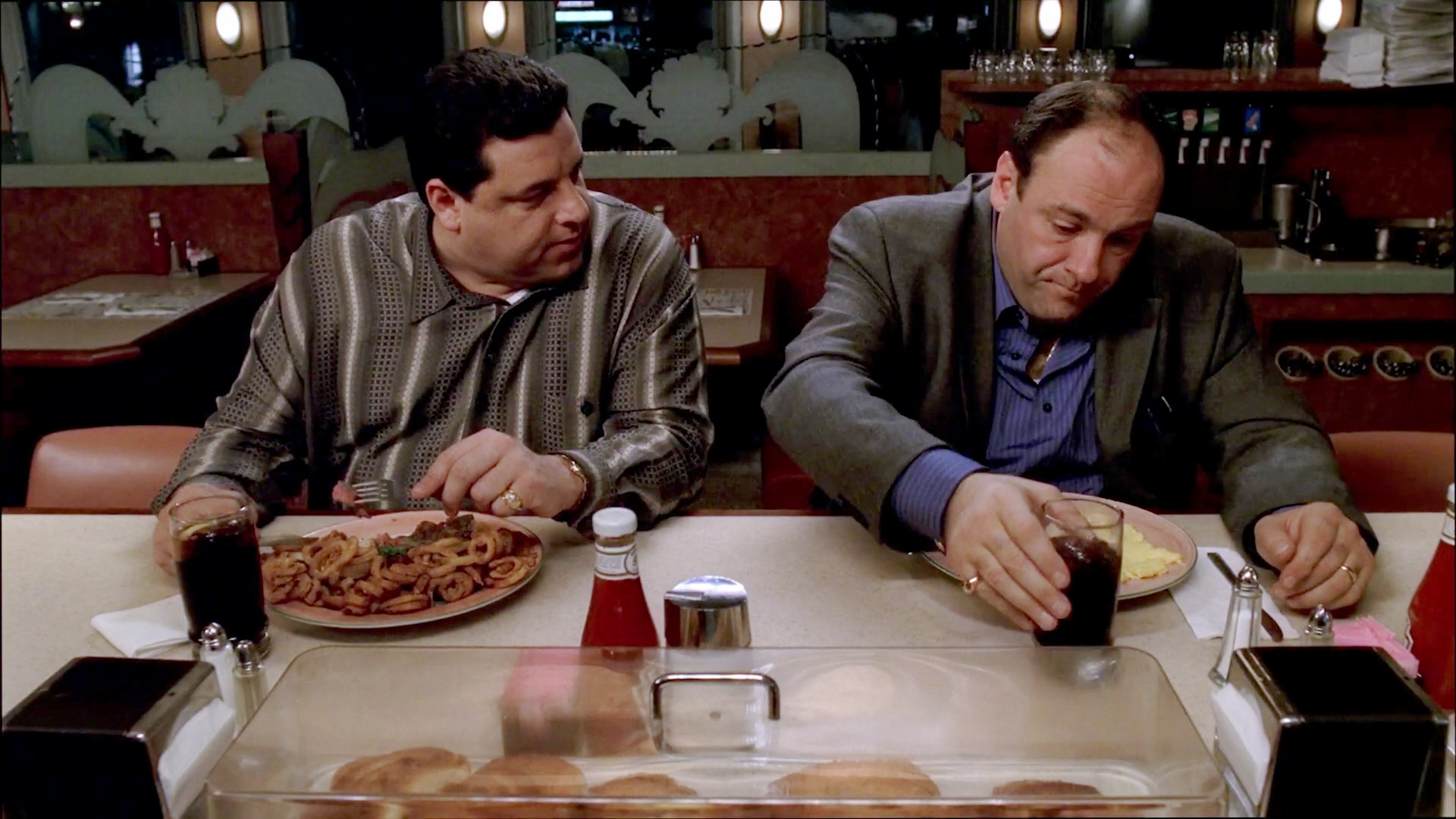
- Bobby Baccalieri and Tony Soprano having dinner
- Episode no.: Season 4 Episode 1
- Directed by: Allen Coulter
- Written by: David Chase
- Cinematography by: Phil Abraham
- Production code: 401
- Original air date: September 15, 2002
- Running time: 58 minutes

Episode chronology
← Previous "Army of One"	Next → "No Show"
- The Sopranos season 4

"For All Debts Public and Private" is the 40th episode of the HBO television series The Sopranos and the first episode of the show's fourth season. Written by David Chase and directed by Allen Coulter, it originally aired on September 15, 2002.

== Starring ==
- James Gandolfini as Tony Soprano
- Lorraine Bracco as Dr. Jennifer Melfi
- Edie Falco as Carmela Soprano
- Michael Imperioli as Christopher Moltisanti
- Dominic Chianese as Corrado Soprano, Jr.
- Steven Van Zandt as Silvio Dante
- Tony Sirico as Paulie Gualtieri
- Robert Iler as Anthony Soprano, Jr.
- Jamie-Lynn Sigler as Meadow Soprano
- Drea de Matteo as Adriana La Cerva
- Aida Turturro as Janice Soprano
- Federico Castelluccio as Furio Giunta
- Vincent Curatola as Johnny Sack
- Steven R. Schirripa as Bobby Baccalieri
- Joe Pantoliano as Ralph Cifaretto

=== Guest starring ===
- Tom Aldredge as Hugh De Angelis
- Sharon Angela as Rosalie Aprile
- Will Arnett as Agent Mike Waldrup
- Val Bisoglio as Murf Lupo
- Joseph R. Gannascoli as Vito Spatafore
- Lola Glaudini as Agent Deborah Ciccerone
- Dan Grimaldi as Patsy Parisi
- Toni Kalem as Angie Bonpensiero
- Marianne Leone as Joanne Moltisanti
- Tony Lip as Carmine Lupertazzi
- George Loros as Raymond Curto
- Richard Maldone as Albert Barese
- Tom Mason as Detective Lieutenant Barry Haydu
- Angelo Massagli as Bobby Baccalieri III
- Arthur J. Nascarella as Carlo Gervasi
- Christine Pedi as Karen Baccalieri
- Peter Riegert as Assemblyman Ronald Zellman
- Frank Santorelli as Georgie
- Suzanne Shepherd as Mary De Angelis
- Lexie Sperduto as Sophia Baccalieri
- Matthew Sussman as Dr. Douglas Schreck
- Gay Thomas-Wilson as Nurse

== Synopsis ==
Junior, worried about money, meets with Tony at his doctor's office, and asks for more help for his medical and legal expenses; Tony, however, has his own expenses and angrily tells him to manage his affairs better. Junior later promotes Bobby Baccalieri. Assemblyman Ron Zellman tells Tony that property in a special development district in Newark is going to rise in value, and Tony remarks that Uncle Junior owns property in that area. Later Tony offers to buy the property, pretending that he is doing his uncle a favor. He also calls a meeting with the family's capos in which he criticizes the lack of growth in their businesses.

Carmela begins to worry about money, having seen the widowed Angie Bonpensiero working at a supermarket. Tony insists that Carmela and the children will be provided for if anything happens to him; he also claims he is no longer hiding money in their house, though he later hides packets of money in a tub of duck feed. Carmela happens to pass by just after he closes the tub.

Paulie is arrested in Youngstown, Ohio, on a gun charge, and resents Tony's apparent indifference. In prison, he calls Johnny Sack, who cultivates his dissatisfaction.

Ralphie and Janice are growing closer. Ralphie comes to a Sunday dinner at Tony and Carmela's home with Rosalie Aprile, but Janice later joins him in the bathroom for cocaine and sex.

Christopher, believing that Tony is treating him harshly because he questioned his action against Jackie Aprile, Jr., begins using heroin again. He complains about the constant presence of Adriana's close friend Danielle, unaware she is actually undercover FBI Agent Ciccerone. Adriana takes her to Tony's home and introduces her to him. Junior learns that there was an undercover agent in his doctor's office; he believes it was the nurse he was flirting with and is mortified that he failed to suspect her.

Speaking to Dr. Melfi about business with unusual frankness, Tony discusses his plans to use Christopher as a proxy in order to avoid jail time or death. Although he knows that Christopher is taking heroin again, he now, in an attempt to bond with him, gives him the name and home address of a recently retired policeman who Tony claims killed his father. Christopher breaks into the man's house and kills him.

== First appearances ==
- Bobby Baccalieri, III: Bobby's son
- Karen Baccalieri: Bobby's wife
- Sophia Baccalieri: Bobby's daughter
- Carlo Gervasi: Soprano/DiMeo crime family capo
- Murf Lupo: Aging former Soprano/DiMeo crime family capo and friend of Junior Soprano
- Cosette: the dog of Adriana La Cerva

== Deceased ==
- Det. Lt. Barry Haydu: shot dead in his home by Christopher Moltisanti to avenge Dickie Moltisanti's murder.

== Title reference ==
- The episode's title is taken from a phrase found on American paper currency: "this note is legal tender for all debts, public and private". The episode ends with a close-up of a twenty-dollar bill that Christopher takes from Lt. Barry Haydu after he kills him—the only episode in the series to not fade to a black screen.

== Production ==
- This episode was the first to be produced and aired after the September 11 attacks. From this episode on, the shot of the World Trade Center towers in the opening credits is absent, replaced by additional shots of industrial scenery before reaching the toll booth.
- Vince Curatola (Johnny Sack) is now billed in the opening credits, but only for the episodes in which he appears.
- A comment made by Carmine Lupertazzi to Tony Soprano, "A don doesn't wear shorts", was added into the show after James Gandolfini was contacted by a supposed real-life mobster who praised him on the authenticity of the show, with the exception that Tony often wears shorts, which he said a real don would never do.
- "For All Debts Public and Private" is one of only two Sopranos episodes in which the end credits roll on top of a picture (the eye of the twenty-dollar bill in this case) instead of a black background (the other episode is "Cold Cuts" from Season 5) and the only episode in which they do so for the entire duration of the credits.

== Other cultural references ==
- The September 11 attacks were referenced twice. First when Bobby Baccala mentions the attacks as a factor of his 69-year-old mother's deteriorating mental health. Tony expresses his fears of deteriorating loyalty when overlooking Junior's legal expenses, referencing the attacks to Dr. Melfi as "That Terrorism shit".
- Bobby subsequently claims that "Quasimodo predicted all this", mistaking The Hunchback of Notre-Dame's main protagonist for Nostradamus, whose supporters believe accurately predicted many major world events.
- In one scene, Junior is shown watching the 1957 CinemaScope drama, Heaven Knows, Mr. Allison.
- During the scene in which Carmela approaches Tony about finances, the movie playing on the television is Rio Bravo, a 1959 Western starring John Wayne, Dean Martin and Ricky Nelson. In the scene that Tony is watching, Martin and Nelson sing a duet, "My Rifle, My Pony and Me". This song is also used at the end of the future episode "Pie-O-My."
- At Lt. Haydu's house, Chris is shown watching the Magnum P.I. episode "No More Mr. Nice Guy."
- When Paulie is on the payphone in county jail, The Jerry Springer Show is seen on the television in the background.
- During the scene in which Janice and Ralphie are snorting cocaine in the bathroom, Janice comments "Oh Bartleby, Oh Humanity" a reference to the drama surrounding Jackie Jr.'s death. This is the last line from Herman Melville's short story "Bartleby, the Scrivener."
- Junior comments that Murf Lupo should "go on Joe Franklin [and] tell the whole tri-state area" about Junior feeling better after passing gas, referring to Joe Franklin's The Joe Franklin Show, the first television talk show.
- Tony sarcastically compares Junior to the Amazing Kreskin.

== Music ==
- The song played at the episode's beginning and over the end credits is "World Destruction" by Time Zone (with John Lydon).
- An early version of the episode's script had it open with the song "If You Don't Know Me By Now" by Harold Melvin & the Blue Notes.
- The song played while two women make out on a hotel bed is "Do You Wanna Get Heavy?" by Jon Spencer Blues Explosion.
- The song playing while Bobby and Tony are eating in the diner is "Theme from A Summer Place" by Percy Faith.
- The song playing while Christopher smokes a heroin-laden cigarette with one of the Icelandic Air Flight Attendants is "Something Something" by Coo Coo Cal.
- The song played while Christopher shoots up is "My Rifle, My Pony, and Me", sung by Dean Martin in Rio Bravo (1959).
- The song playing while Det. Lt. Haydu pulls into his driveway is "Lady Marmalade" by Labelle.
- The song playing when Carmela sees Angie in the supermarket is "Saturday in the Park" by Chicago from their album Chicago V.
