= Maria Laurino =

American journalist and writer

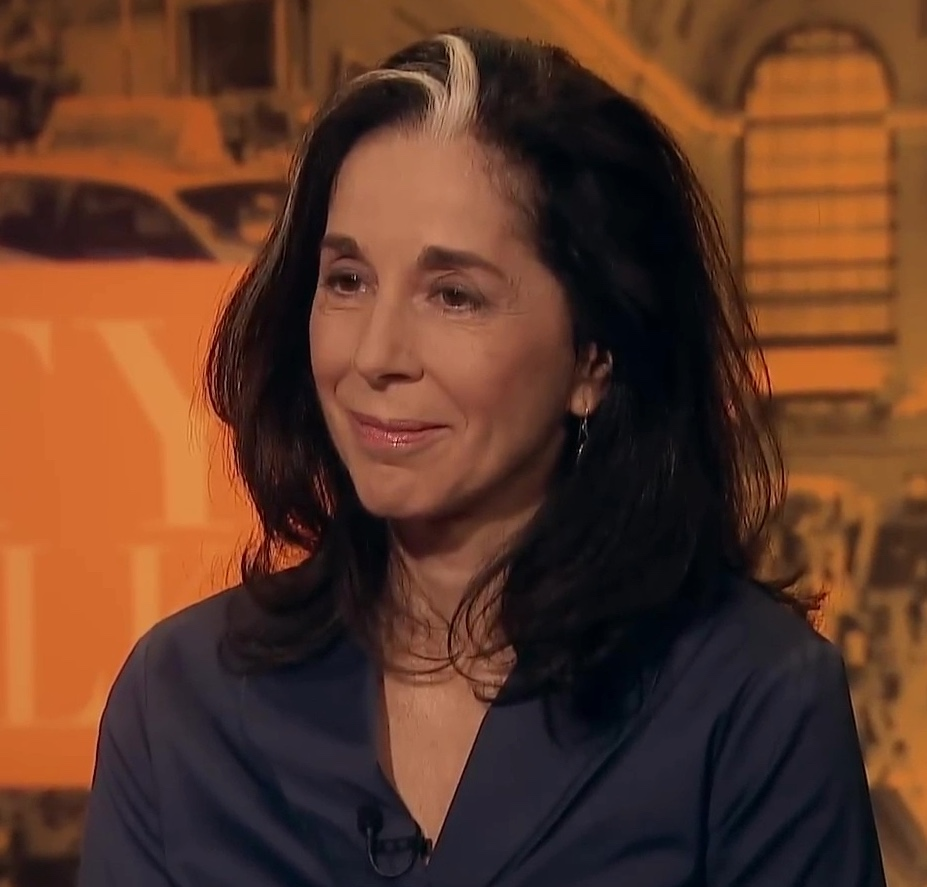
- Larino on CUNY TV's City Talk, 2015
- Born: North Jersey, U.S.
- Education: Georgetown University (BA); New York University (MA)
- Spouse: Anthony Shorris
- Children: 1

Maria Laurino (April 24, 1959) is an American journalist, essayist, memoirist, and former political speechwriter.

== Early life and education ==
Maria Laurino, a third generation Italian-American, grew up in North Jersey. She graduated from Georgetown University and received her graduate degree in English literature from New York University. In 2018, Laurino was honored as a Cavaliere dell'Ordine della Stella d'Italia (Knight of the Order of the Star of Italy) by the Italian Consul General Francesco Genuardi on behalf of Italian President Sergio Mattarella.

== Career ==
Laurino began her career as a journalist at The Village Voice, where she covered local and state politics and social issues, such as New York's housing market and the resulting surge in its homeless population. In 1989, Laurino left the Village Voice to become the Chief Speechwriter for New York City Mayor David Dinkins, serving until the end of his term in 1993. After leaving government, Laurino returned to freelance journalism, writing for numerous publications, including The New York Times; and her essays have been widely anthologized, including in the Norton Reader. Her first memoir, Were You Always an Italian?, was a national bestseller and explored the issue of ethnic identity among Italian-Americans. Her second memoir, Old World Daughter, New World Mother, examined the pull and tug the author experienced between Old World traditions that valued familial dependence and a New World feminism that prized female autonomy. In 2014, she published The Italian Americans: A History, chronicling the Italian-American experience from 1860 to the present day (companion book to the PBS series of the same name). In 2024, Laurino published The Price of Children: Stolen lives in a land of without choice.

She also has a story co-writing credit on the 2002 Sopranos episode Christopher.

== Personal life ==
Laurino is married to Anthony Shorris, a civil servant who served as First Deputy Mayor of New York City and Executive Director of the Port Authority of New York and New Jersey. They have one son and live in New York City.
