= Christopher (The Sopranos) =

- The Sopranos episode
- Episode no.: Season 4 Episode 3
- Directed by: Tim Van Patten
- Story by: Michael Imperioli; Maria Laurino
- Teleplay by: Michael Imperioli
- Cinematography by: Phil Abraham
- Original air date: September 29, 2002
- Running time: 54 minutes

Episode chronology
← Previous "No Show"	Next → "The Weight"
- The Sopranos season 4

"Christopher" is the third episode of the fourth season of the HBO original series The Sopranos. Its teleplay was written by Michael Imperioli, adapted from a story idea by himself and Maria Laurino, and was directed by Tim Van Patten. It first aired on September 29, 2002, in the United States. Imperioli stated the episode was written in response to discrimination accusations by Italian-American anti-defamation activists against the series.

"Christopher" revolves around Silvio Dante and the crew's efforts to sabotage protests against the Columbus Day Parade, due to their belief that the protests were motivated by anti-Italian sentiment. Concurrently, the death and subsequent funeral of Bobby Baccalieri's wife, Karen, take place. The episode is often regarded by critics as one of the worst of the series, with the main plot garnering most of the criticism. As a result of the episode, cast members Lorraine Bracco and Dominic Chianese were banned from attending the 2002 New York City Columbus Day Parade.

== Plot ==
Consigliere Silvio (Steven Van Zandt) wants to take action against Native Americans protesting the Columbus Day parade, believing their actions to be insulting to Italian-Americans. When, without Tony's (James Gandolfini) approval, he, Patsy (Dan Grimaldi), and Artie (John Ventimiglia) attempt to break up the protest, Little Paulie (Carl Capotorto) and several others are injured. Ralphie (Joe Pantoliano) threatens the protest leader, Professor Del Redclay, that he will make it known that Iron Eyes Cody, a popular Native American figure, was actually an Italian-American. Tony unsuccessfully appeals to Assemblyman Ron Zellman (Peter Riegert) and to an Indian chief to convince Redclay to cancel the protest. The chief invites Tony and his crew to his casino. In response to Silvio's rage, Tony argues to Silvio that his achievements came through his own abilities, not through his heritage, and scorns the idea that everyone belongs to a victimized group.

At a luncheon meant to instill Italian pride in women, the mob wives feel singled out when the speaker attempts to dissociate Italian culture from the Mafia. After the luncheon, Gabriella (Maureen Van Zandt) lectures Father Phil (Paul Schulze) about how much the mob wives, especially Carmela (Edie Falco), have given to the parish, and says he had no right to bring in a guest speaker.

Paulie (Tony Sirico) calls Johnny (Vincent Curatola) from prison and, apparently inadvertently, reveals Ralphie's crude joke about Johnny's wife. The Soprano and Lupertazzi families soon meet over a meal: Johnny, speaking for Carmine (Tony Lip), demands a share of the profit Tony made from Junior's (Dominic Chianese) warehouse, which was recently flipped. Tony agrees but comes to the conclusion that someone from his organization is leaking information to the Lupertazzi family. Now that Johnny knows of Ralphie's joke, he is furiously hostile to him, baffling Ralphie.

Bobby's (Steve Schirripa) wife, Karen (Christine Pedi) is killed in a road accident. The women feel sympathy for Bobby during the wake and discuss his having never taken a comare. Spending time with him in his home, Janice (Aida Turturro) is touched by his sincere grief. Shortly after Ralphie leaves Rosalie (Sharon Angela), Janice allows him to move in with her, but after a discussion with her therapist, she wills herself to break up with him. When he comes home with his baggage, she yells at him to leave and pushes him down the stairs, injuring his back. Janice locks herself in her room as Ralphie hobbles back to his car.

== Production ==
In his 2021 book Woke Up This Morning: The Definitive Oral History of the Sopranos, the episode's writer Michael Imperioli, recalled that "Christopher" was initially conceived as an episode intended for Paulie Gualtieri, in large part because Gualtieri was already established as a character who was protective of Italian culture, but due to Tony Sirico's back surgery, the role was given to Silvio Dante instead. Imperioli co-conceived the storyline with journalist Maria Laurino, who conceptualized it as "a story line involving Italian-American identity politics". Imperioli noted that it was initially a "hard episode to write" because he felt it was not believable that the Soprano crew was passionate about Christopher Columbus's legacy.

However, he wrote that the absurdity of the main plot helped him finish the episode's script. Imperioli said that the episode was "David [Chase]'s way of sticking it" to Italian-American anti-defamation activists who were displeased with The Sopranos' portrayal of them. In Matt Zoller Seitz's 2019 book, The Sopranos Sessions, Chase mentioned that he was disillusioned with "the hypocrisy of all those anti-Italian anti-defamation [accusations]" that were often thrown against the show and that he saw the episode as a way to get back at them.

== Themes and analysis ==
The main plot of "Christopher" focuses on the divisive legacy of Italian explorer Christopher Columbus, in particular, his legacy among Italian-Americans, as well as tackling themes of whiteness and Italian pride. Silvio and the crew's anger at the anti-Columbus Day protests and their attempts to sabotage the efforts of the protestors are all motivated by their own perception of the protests and, in turn, the protestors being motivated by anti-Italian sentiment.

Silvio's rant at the end of the episode and Tony's subsequent counter-rant showcase the unique historical status of Italian-Americans and their whiteness. Tony's rant also mentions Gary Cooper, an actor whom Tony idolizes and nicknames "the strong silent type.", the rant has been noted to be almost identical to Tony's rant in "The Sopranos".

In the same rant, Tony is angered by the fact that Silvio labelled Cooper a "Medigan", a derogatory term used to refer to fully assimilated Italian-Americans or non-Italians of Anglo-Saxon heritage. Despite these themes, because of Silvio's role on the show as comic relief, the main plot ultimately ends up being little more than a joke and is detached from the secondary plot of the episode, focusing on the death of Bobby's wife, Karen. The final scene also makes use of "Dawn (Go Away)", a 1964 song by American band the Four Seasons. In American critic Matt Zoller Seitz's 2019 book, The Sopranos Sessions, show-creator and show-runner David Chase explained that the song was used due to the Four Seasons being made up of Italian-Americans, meshing with Tony and Silvio's conversation about the historical mistreatment of Italian-Americans.

== Release ==
"Christopher" was first broadcast on HBO on September 29, 2002, on the show's usual prime-time spot of 9 p.m. Eastern Standard Time. It was viewed by 10.79 million viewers during its original airing. 6.5% of all households in America viewed the episode during its initial airing, a small decline of 0.2% from the previous episode, "No Show".

"Christopher" was first released on home video in the United States on October 28, 2003, in The Complete Fourth Season DVD boxset, where it was featured on the first disk. It was later featured as part of The Complete Series DVD boxset in 2008 and then again as part of the same boxset on Blu-ray in 2014.

=== Reception ===
"Christopher" is frequently regarded by critics as one of the weakest episodes of The Sopranos, with much of the criticism being directed at its main plot. Slant Magazine's Brad LaBonte wrote in his 2007 review of the episode that the main plot was "misguided" and that the characters' mockery of images as "useless" was "more than pointless". However, he felt that the question the episode raised was interesting, even if the episode could not answer it. In her 2011 review of the episode on The A.V. Club, Emily St. James wrote that while the episode is "the worst episode by several degrees", it still had a few memorable scenes, with her review highlighting the scene in which Ralph Cifaretto attempts to extort one of the protestors by threatening to reveal that actor Iron Eyes Cody was actually Italian-American. She noted that while the episode's main message is "vaguely well-expressed", the way it does so is "tortured and awkward". She also praised the other plots of the episode, in particular noting that the death of Karen was "heartfelt" despite her lack of appearances on the show. In a 2014 review of the episode, Vox's Dylan Matthews criticised the plot as being "silly on just about every dimension" and noted that it felt forced, highlighting Ralph Cifaretto's dialogue during the opening scene as part of a "clunky attempt" to get as many background characters to speak about Columbus at once. Matthew also criticised the episode's depiction of Native Americans, noting that they are depicted as unsympathetic and corrupt. Matthews also compared the lack of subtlety and wit in the episode's dialogue to "an eighth-grader assigned by his history teacher to write up Columbus's pros and cons".

In October 2002, cast members Lorraine Bracco and Dominic Chianese were banned from attending that year's New York City Columbus Day Parade by the event's organizers, who cited "Christopher" as their motivation in doing so. In protest, Michael Bloomberg, then Mayor of New York City, refused to attend the parade.
