= The Weight (The Sopranos) =

- The Sopranos episode
- Episode no.: Season 4 Episode 4
- Directed by: Jack Bender
- Written by: Terence Winter
- Cinematography by: Phil Abraham
- Production code: 404
- Original air date: October 6, 2002
- Running time: 58 minutes

Episode chronology
← Previous "Christopher"	Next → "Pie-O-My"
- The Sopranos season 4

"The Weight" is the 43rd episode of the HBO original series The Sopranos and the fourth episode of the show's fourth season, marking the exact halfway point in the program's run. Written by Terence Winter and directed by Jack Bender, it originally aired on October 6, 2002.

== Starring ==
- James Gandolfini as Tony Soprano
- Lorraine Bracco as Dr. Jennifer Melfi
- Edie Falco as Carmela Soprano
- Michael Imperioli as Christopher Moltisanti
- Dominic Chianese as Corrado Soprano, Jr.
- Steven Van Zandt as Silvio Dante
- Tony Sirico as Paulie Gualtieri *
- Robert Iler as Anthony Soprano, Jr.
- Jamie-Lynn Sigler as Meadow Soprano
- Drea de Matteo as Adriana La Cerva
- Aida Turturro as Janice Soprano *
- Vincent Curatola as Johnny Sack
- Steven R. Schirripa as Bobby Baccalieri
- Federico Castelluccio as Furio Giunta
- Joe Pantoliano as Ralph Cifaretto

* = credit only

=== Guest starring ===
- Sharon Angela as Rosalie Aprile
- Peter Bogdanovich as Elliot Kupferberg
- Denise Borino as Ginny Sacrimoni
- Carl Capotorto as Little Paulie Germani
- Matthew Del Negro as Brian Cammarata
- Raymond Franza as Donny K.
- Robert Funaro as Eugene Pontecorvo
- Joseph R. Gannascoli as Vito Spatafore
- Dan Grimaldi as Patsy Parisi
- Tony Lip as Carmine Lupertazzi
- Richard Maldone as Ally Boy Barese
- Joe Maruzzo as Joey Peeps
- Maureen Van Zandt as Gabriella Dante
- Joseph Castellana as Lou 'Dimaggio' Galina
- Richard Bright as Frank Crisci
- Jeff Robins as Chris Galina
- Lisa Altomare as Rose Galina
- Stephen Sable as Florida Hit Man
- Julie Goldman as Saskia Kupferberg
- Angelo Massagli as Bobby Baccalieri III

== Synopsis ==
Johnny is consumed with anger about Ralphie's joke about Ginny, leading him to savagely assault a member of Ralph's crew whom he encounters at a bar. When Tony confronts him, he blames his temper, but also says he loves his "Rubenesque" wife. On Tony's instructions, Ralphie phones Johnny to try and make peace. Tony listens in on the call, and tells Ralph not to apologize, but feign outrage. Ralph ignores Tony's instructions and gives a half-hearted apology; Johnny takes this as an admission of guilt and is further angered.

Johnny asks Carmine to permit a hit on Ralphie; he refuses. There are two sit-downs. Johnny walks out of the first because Ralphie is present. At the second, Ralphie is not present, but Johnny remains inflexible and insists on retaliation to defend his wife's honor. Carmine turns him down again and tells him to "get the fuck over it." Johnny walks out again.

Carmine hints to Tony that Johnny can be killed, and Silvio and Christopher arrange for it to be done in Boston, where Johnny will be visiting his father. Simultaneously, Johnny arranges for Ralphie to be killed in Miami, where he is staying in a hotel.

Johnny leaves New Jersey for Boston but returns home to retrieve a sweater. He finds Ginny with a stash of junk food and candy. Initially angry, he reminds her that he never asked her to lose weight but is deeply hurt that she has lied to him. He calls off the hit at the last moment and tells Tony he will accept Ralphie's apology.

Meadow joins a legal aid organization representing underprivileged clients in the South Bronx. Tony is not pleased that she is drifting away from her plan to be a pediatrician.

Carmela and Tony argue bitterly about their finances. She and Furio, who comes each morning to pick Tony up, are growing closer. He has bought a house and she goes to see it with A.J. At the housewarming party, Carmela and Furio dance together to sensual Italian music.

Tony, inspired by Johnny's devotion to his wife, buys Carmela some flowers and a little black dress from Saks Fifth Avenue. She puts it on. Greatly aroused, he takes her to bed. In the next room, Meadow starts to play the song Carmela and Furio danced to. Carmela yells for her to turn the song off and she complies. But as Tony lies heavily on top of her, Carmela's eyes open, and she imagines that she is still hearing the music to which she and Furio danced.

== First appearances ==
- Joseph "Joey Peeps" Peparelli: an associate in the Lupertazzi crime family and the driver/bodyguard of Johnny Sack
- Brian Cammarata: Carmela's cousin and the family's "financial adviser"

== Title reference ==
- The title refers to the joke Ralph Cifaretto made about Ginny Sacrimoni's weight in "No Show", a joke which Johnny Sack eventually learned about from Paulie Gualtieri; this remark almost cost two arguing mobsters their lives.
- The title also has metaphorical meaning for several situations throughout the show; Carmela's fears about the family's financial situation and her feelings for Furio; the weight of the situation between Johnny and Ralph; the weight of Dr Melfi feeling as if her rape was her fault, and its effect on her life as well.

== Music ==
- Music from Furio's housewarming includes "O'Mare" and in particular "Vesuvio", by the Italian band Spaccanapoli, which is later played over the end credits.
- "Suddenly Last Summer" by The Motels plays in the background when Furio visits Carmela.
- One scene at the Bada Bing features ZZ Top's "Tush", a subtextual reference to the joke about the mole removed from Ginny's tush - Tony refers to Ginny's tush immediately before the Bada Bing office door opens and "Tush" is heard blaring from within the club.
- Music playing in the background at the Atwell Avenue Boys' house is "No Other Love" by Rodgers and Hammerstein.
- "Sally Go 'Round the Roses" by The Jaynetts plays on Johnny Sack's car radio.

== References to other media ==
- When Tony is discussing Ralphie's joke with Junior, they are watching the game show Who Wants to Be a Millionaire. Just before the contestant answers incorrectly, Junior says, "The fifth question, and the poor prick used all his lifelines."
