= Watching Too Much Television =

- The Sopranos episode
- Episode no.: Season 4 Episode 7
- Directed by: John Patterson
- Story by: David Chase; Robin Green; Mitchell Burgess; Terence Winter
- Teleplay by: Terence Winter; Nick Santora
- Cinematography by: Alik Sakharov
- Production code: 407
- Original air date: October 27, 2002
- Running time: 54 minutes

Episode chronology
← Previous "Everybody Hurts"	Next → "Mergers and Acquisitions"
- The Sopranos season 4

"Watching Too Much Television" is the 46th episode of the HBO original series, The Sopranos and the seventh episode of the show's fourth season. Its teleplay was written by Nick Santora and Terence Winter from a story by Robin Green, Mitchell Burgess, Terence Winter, and David Chase. It was directed by John Patterson and originally aired on October 27, 2002.

== Starring ==
- James Gandolfini as Tony Soprano
- Lorraine Bracco as Dr. Jennifer Melfi
- Edie Falco as Carmela Soprano
- Michael Imperioli as Christopher Moltisanti
- Dominic Chianese as Corrado Soprano, Jr. *
- Steven Van Zandt as Silvio Dante
- Tony Sirico as Paulie Gualtieri
- Robert Iler as Anthony Soprano, Jr.
- Jamie-Lynn Sigler as Meadow Soprano
- Drea de Matteo as Adriana La Cerva
- Aida Turturro as Janice Soprano
- Federico Castelluccio as Furio Giunta
- Vincent Curatola as Johnny Sack
- Steven R. Schirripa as Bobby Baccalieri
- Joe Pantoliano as Ralph Cifaretto

* = credit only

=== Guest starring ===
- Sharon Angela as Rosalie Aprile
- Oksana Lada as Irina Peltsin
- Carl Capotorto as Little Paulie Germani
- Max Casella as Benny Fazio
- Vondie Curtis-Hall as Maurice Tiffen
- Matthew Del Negro as Brian Cammarata
- Joseph R. Gannascoli as Vito Spatafore
- Lola Glaudini as Agent Deborah Ciccerone Waldrup
- Dan Grimaldi as Patsy Parisi
- Marianne Leone as Joanne Moltisanti
- Richard Maldone as Ally Boy Barese
- Anna Mancini as Donna Parisi
- Patty McCormack as Liz La Cerva
- Frank Pellegrino as Bureau Chief Frank Cubitoso
- Richard Portnow as Harold Melvoin
- Peter Riegert as Ronald Zellman
- Matt Servitto as Agent Dwight Harris
- Lewis J. Stadlen as Dr. Ira Fried
- Lauren Toub as Liz DiLiberto
- Maureen Van Zandt as Gabriella Dante
- Vanessa Liguori as Terri
- Karen Young as Agent Robyn Sanseverino
- Malcolm Barrett as Angelo Davis
- Nichelle Hines as Felicia
- Victor Matamoros as Attorney
- Sally Stewart as Lenore Tiffen

== Synopsis ==
Adriana gets the idea from a TV crime drama that spouses cannot be forced to testify against each other, so she surprises Christopher by proposing that, after two years' engagement, they should get married. But when she confesses that she might not be able to have children, he storms out. Tony and Silvio urge him to marry her regardless. Fortified by heroin, Christopher apologizes for his outburst and tells her he will marry her. But she learns from a lawyer that the TV drama was wrong: in a major trial, she can be made to testify. At her bridal shower, she cheerlessly unwraps her presents.

Furio Giunta invents a pretext to phone Carmela and tells her he has a pretty picture of her from the house-warming, but next morning he declines to enter the house, saying there is a problem in the car.

Brian Cammarata casually mentions a bogus housing deal he knows about, but Tony and Ralphie take it seriously and carry out their own scheme to defraud the U.S. Department of Housing and Urban Development. They make use of Dr. Ira Fried, Assemblyman Ronald Zellman, and Maurice Tiffen, a black activist. Some derelict houses are purchased. Tony takes A.J. for a drive, showing him the houses to illustrate his family's proud history of dedication to work. One of the houses is occupied by black squatters who have turned it into a crack den. Tony puts pressure on Zellman to evict them: Zellman puts pressure on Tiffen; Tiffen demurs at the use of violence, but four armed teens are sent and the squatters are violently evicted. Based on false appraisals, a large loan is obtained from HUD. Fried, Zellman, and Tiffen get their cuts; Tony presents Brian with a Patek Philippe watch. Zellman and Tiffen recall they were idealists together in the '60s and briefly lament the corruption of their ideals.

Paulie is released from jail. There is a big welcome-back party and an envelope of cash from Tony. But Paulie is still resentful that Tony never contacted him when he was in prison, and speaks of this to Johnny Sack. He tells him Tony has a new property scam. Johnny confirms their conversations are secret, and tells Paulie that Carmine Lupertazzi thinks very highly of him.

Zellman diffidently informs Tony he is having a serious relationship with his ex-mistress Irina. Tony does not seem to mind. One day he finds a pretext to go to Zellman's house and sees Irina again. One night, drunk and overcome by emotion, he drives to the house and barges up to the bedroom where he finds Zellman half-undressed. Tony takes off his belt and lashes him with it, saying, "All the girls in New Jersey, you had to fuck this one?"

== Final appearances ==
- Ronald Zellman – Newark assemblyman, and associate of Tony Soprano.

== Title reference ==
- Adriana watches the TV series Murder One and learns that she doesn't have to turn state's evidence against Christopher if they get married. But, her friend tells her that according to an episode of Murder, She Wrote, that is not always the case.

== Other cultural references ==
- Silvio makes a reference to the movie Papillon to Paulie when they first meet each other after he gets out of jail.
- Maurice Tiffen says The Chi-Lites and Tommy James and the Shondells were almost signed to the same record label, but Tony corrects him by saying The Chi-Lites were actually signed to Brunswick Records.
- Tony says he and AJ are partners Starsky & Hutch when a crack dealer asks them if they are police.
- Paulie tells Johnny Sack he missed Good & Plenties while in prison.
- In separate scenes Adriana watches Murder One and The A-Team on television.
- The watch Tony presents to Brian is a Patek Philippe white gold and diamond, annual calendar, Ref. 5037/1G.
- Tony listens to WCBS-FM.
- Paulie and Johnny eat at the River Café restaurant in Brooklyn.
- Maurice Tiffen's line "Nobody said anything about violence. We renounced it, remember? When Eldridge went into the codpiece business." refers to black radical Eldridge Cleaver and his codpiece-revival "virility pants" from the '70s.
- Maurice Tiffen makes a reference to the Beatles song "Taxman" being used in a commercial for H&R Block.

== Connections to prior episodes ==
- Like he did with Meadow in the pilot episode, Tony takes A.J. to see the church Corrado Soprano, Sr. built when he first came to the U.S. from Avellino.

== Music ==
- The song played to welcome Paulie back ("Paulie's song") is "Nancy (With the Laughing Face)" by Frank Sinatra; it's never explained why it's significant to him.
- The song which is played over the end credits is "Oh Girl" by The Chi-Lites. The song was also heard earlier at the Russian bathhouse, where Tony, Zellman, and Tiffen discuss it.
- In the diner scene where Brian, Tony, and Ralph discuss the HUD scam, a muzak version of "Rikki Don't Lose That Number" by Steely Dan plays in the background.
- When Zellman and Tony are talking in the changing room after the sauna, the Booker T. & the M.G.'s song "Green Onions" is playing.
- During a discussion between Tony and Christopher, the Foghat song "Slow Ride" is playing in the background.
- On Tony's car radio, en route to Assemblyman Zellman's house, "Oh Girl" is preceded by "You Ain't Seen Nothing Yet" by Bachman–Turner Overdrive.
- At the Bada Bing, the song "Drive" by Nashville Pussy is playing.
