= William H. Cane =

American harness racing executive (1874–1956)

- Born: William Henry Cane; August 5, 1874; Jersey City, New Jersey, U.S.
- Died: March 27, 1956 (aged 81); Miami Beach, Florida, U.S.
- Resting place: Brookside Cemetery
- Other names: Mr. Trotting; Bill Cane
- Occupations: Builder; Harness racing executive
- Honors: United States Harness Racing Hall of Fame (1958)

William H. Cane (August 5, 1874 – March 27, 1956) was an American harness racing executive, owner, and promoter. He was inducted into the United States Harness Racing Hall of Fame in 1958.

== Early life and education ==
William Henry Cane was born on August 5, 1874, in Jersey City, New Jersey, United States. He was the son of Catherine A. and Frederick W. Cane, who was born in Brooklyn, New York, and later settled in the construction business in New Jersey. His father, F. W. Cane, was one of the pioneer builders of Jersey City. In his early years, he grew up around his father's stable of work horses, carriage horses, and trotters. At age 13, he was given a trotting pony and carriage. He entered amateur competition two years later and was a full amateur driver by age 16. During the 1890s, he gained his first experience in racing at the Gutenberg track in Union County.

He attended the public schools of Jersey City, later completing his education at Hasbrouck Institute. He moved with his family to Bogota, New Jersey in 1893, where his father became the first mayor of Bogota that year, serving for 15 years.

== Career ==
=== Business & political career ===
Upon graduating, he entered the family construction business managed by his father and grandfather. When his grandfather retired, he acquired the remaining interest and joined his father in partnership. He went on to establish a successful contracting business and build significant wealth. With business offices located at 21 Park Row, it became one of the largest construction companies in New York City.

In 1900, he entered local politics as a member of the Republican County Committee of Bogota. He was involved in county campaigns and later, in 1908, sought the Republican Assembly nomination in Bergen County.

He assumed full control of the W. H. & F. W. Cane Construction Company around 1920 after acquiring his father's stake when he retired. The Jersey City contractor built the 80,000-seat wooden stadium Boyle's Thirty Acres in 1921 for Tex Rickard, who used it for Jack Dempsey vs. Georges Carpentier. His construction firm also built office buildings, schools, hospitals, and warehouse terminals. Among the important buildings he built was the Labor Bank Building. He exited the construction business on medical advice from his physician in the mid-1920s.

==== Hackensack Arena ====
Cane took over a mortgaged garage on First Street in Hackensack, New Jersey during the early 1930s and put it into operation. He redeveloped the property into a 5,500-capacity indoor stadium intended as a community athletic center and sports arena for amateur and professional events. It was formally opened as the Hackensack Arena on January 4, 1934, for roller skating. The sports promoter conceived the idea from watching skaters in Central Park. In addition to roller skating, Cane's Hackensack Sports Arena served as a professional boxing arena for several years.

=== Racing career ===
==== Good Time Stable ====
Cane established his own stable with a string of standardbreds and also owned thoroughbreds. At the annual Fasig-Tipton Old Glory Sale held at Madison Square Garden in November 1919, he spent $5,100 as the top bidder on two trotters. He approached William K. Dickerson, then training a public stable at Goshen, New York, to take control of the horses and ship them there for the 1920 season. He purchased the private barn established by the late J. Howard Ford at Goshen's Historic Track in December 1919. The facility, costing about $35,000, featured 10 stalls, an office, a carriage room, and staff quarters. By then, he had acquired six to eight trotters for the stable. Under the name "Good Time Stable of Goshen," he raced trotters and pacers and employed trainers. He hired C. E. Pitman to train his horses for the 1920 Grand Circuit season. In December 1921, the stable owner secured Walter R. Cox, then the highest-paid trainer in the country, to train and drive for his Good Time Stable heading into 1922. The venture developed into a successful racing and breeding enterprise for two decades.

Representing the Goshen Driving Club as an amateur, he competed at Weequahic Park in 1921, setting a 2:10 mile record with Norman Dillon and driving Northern Direct to a world record pace. At the 1923 Orange County Circuit races in Monroe, New York, he was thrown from the sulky and broke both ankles. He returned to driving 18 months later before stopping at his wife's insistence.

==== Good Time Park ====
He bought the Good Time Park mile course at Goshen in 1924 from the E. H. Harriman estate and quickly began upgrading the facility. For years, he presided over the Goshen Mile Track Association Inc.

Cane, along with a group of associates, proposed the creation of a major harness racing stake, eventually established as the annual Hambletonian Stakes and first held in 1926. He later bred Walter Dear, which won the 1929 Hambletonian Stakes with Walter Cox as driver. As the highest bidder, Cane became sponsor of the Hambletonian in 1930, with the race being staged at his Good Time Park. He went on to sponsor the race at Good Time Park for the next 26 years. He promoted the stakes event into a $100,000 race by 1951. Before his death, he opposed efforts to move the Hambletonian from Good Time Park at Goshen to a larger city to increase attendance.

==== Racing commissioner ====
In 1927, he began serving on the executive board of the Trotting Horse Club of America along with E. Roland Harriman. The Trotting Horse Club of America appointed him as an arbiter for Grand Circuit racing in 1933. He was also named a member of the New Jersey Racing Commission by New Jersey Governor A. Harry Moore in 1933 and again in 1940. His expertise centered on the business side of horse racing and the management of racetracks. He helped organize the National Association of State Commissioners for Thoroughbred Racing in 1934 and was elected first vice president in 1935. He played a key role in the 1940 revival and reorganization of thoroughbred racing in New Jersey.

The Good Time Park owner became chairman of the board of the Fairgrounds Speedway in Louisville, Kentucky in June 1949, joining J. Fred Miles and Henry H. Knight in the venture. As a director of the Michigan Racing Association Inc., he helped develop a new harness racing venture in the Detroit area in 1949 and became president of the Wolverine Harness Raceway at Detroit Race Course.

==== Yonkers Raceway ====
In late 1949, he relinquished his Goshen Mile Track Association license and became president of the newly formed Yonkers Trotting Association, Inc., which was granted a 62-night racing permit. Cane presided over the establishment of New York's Yonkers Raceway in 1950. He converted the old Empire City running track into a trotting track. Under his leadership, the raceway achieved the first $1,000,000 handle in trotting history on May 20, 1950.

==== Harness racing museum ====
Cane was among the industry leaders who organized a harness racing museum in July 1949 and was appointed one of its original trustees. His Good Time Stable building later became the Hall of Fame of the Trotter in 1951, now known as the Harness Racing Museum & Hall of Fame.

== Personal life ==
Cane was a former resident of Hackensack, New Jersey. He lived on the east side of Larch Avenue with a view over the Hackensack Valley. He later maintained homes in Miami Beach and Goshen.

He married Lillian Cooper of New Brighton. Lillian was the daughter of the distinguished Cooper family of Staten Island. His first wife died in 1945. At 76 years old in 1952, he married Virginia F. Woerner.

== Death ==
William H. Cane died on March 27, 1956, in Miami Beach, Florida, United States, at the age of 81. He was interred at Brookside Cemetery in Englewood, New Jersey.

== Legacy ==
He had founded the William H. Cane Foundation in 1949 to award scholarships to high school students, with any remaining funds directed to a proposed William H. Cane Scholarship Fund at Princeton University. When he passed away in 1956, his will granted $3,000,000 to establish a scholarship fund in his name at Princeton, intended to assist needy high school graduates, especially from Hackensack, Bogota, Jersey City, and Goshen.

His horse, Good Time, was named the 1949 Harness Horse of the Year, the first pacer to win the award. At his Goshen home, he kept a room solely for the trophies won by Good Time.

He became a recipient of the United States Harness Writers Association Proximity Award in 1953.

The William H. Cane Futurity, now known as the Cane Pace, was named in his honor at Yonkers Raceway in 1955.

Nicknamed "Mr. Trotting," he was a harness racing pioneer who devoted more than 65 years of his life to the sport as a driver, trainer, owner, breeder, track operator, and commissioner. He was posthumously elected to the Hall of Fame of the Trotter in 1958.
