= No Show =

- The Sopranos episode
- Episode no.: Season 4 Episode 2
- Directed by: John Patterson
- Written by: David Chase; Terence Winter
- Cinematography by: Alik Sakharov
- Production code: 402
- Original air date: September 22, 2002
- Running time: 57 minutes

Episode chronology
← Previous "For All Debts Public and Private"	Next → "Christopher"
- The Sopranos season 4

"No-Show" is the 41st episode of the HBO television series The Sopranos and the second episode of the show's fourth season. Written by David Chase and Terence Winter, it was directed by John Patterson and originally aired on September 22, 2002.

== Starring ==
- James Gandolfini as Tony Soprano
- Lorraine Bracco as Dr. Jennifer Melfi
- Edie Falco as Carmela Soprano
- Michael Imperioli as Christopher Moltisanti
- Dominic Chianese as Corrado Soprano, Jr. *
- Steven Van Zandt as Silvio Dante
- Tony Sirico as Paulie Gualtieri
- Robert Iler as Anthony Soprano, Jr.
- Jamie-Lynn Sigler as Meadow Soprano
- Drea de Matteo as Adriana La Cerva
- Aida Turturro as Janice Soprano
- Federico Castelluccio as Furio Giunta
- Steven R. Schirripa as Bobby Baccalieri
- John Ventimiglia as Artie Bucco
- Joe Pantoliano as Ralph Cifaretto

* = credit only

=== Guest starring ===
- Will Arnett as Agent Mike Waldrup
- Carl Capotorto as Little Paulie Germani
- Max Casella as Benny Fazio
- Robert Desiderio as Jack Massarone
- Raymond Franza as Donny K
- Danyelle Freeman as Misty Giaculo
- Robert Funaro as Eugene Pontecorvo
- Joseph R. Gannascoli as Vito Spatafore
- Lola Glaudini as Agent Deborah Ciccerone
- Dan Grimaldi as Patsy Parisi
- Linda Lavin as Dr. Wendy Kobler
- George Loros as Raymond Curto
- Richard Maldone as Albert Barese
- Arthur J. Nascarella as Carlo Gervasi
- Frank Pellegrino as Chief Frank Cubitoso
- Matt Servitto as Agent Dwight Harris

== Synopsis ==
Meadow's recent lack of drive, caused by Jackie Jr.'s death, continues to worry Tony and Carmela. She reveals that she hasn't registered for classes because she hopes to travel to Europe with a friend. Tony discusses the problem with Dr. Melfi, who recommends a psychologist, Dr. Wendy Kobler, specializing in adolescents. Kobler encourages Meadow's plans, prompting a protracted family argument where Meadow confronts Tony about his profession; he claims that he did everything he could to save Jackie. She leaves the house; her parents fear she has left the country, but it is later revealed that she has instead returned to her classes at Columbia University.

Carmela begins flirting with Furio as he makes his morning visits to pick up Tony. Ralphie and Janice's relationship continues, despite Tony's disapproval.

Christopher is appointed acting capo of Paulie's crew; Patsy resents this, having been a made man longer than Christopher. Silvio mentions Patsy's displeasure to Tony, but Tony is unperturbed. Silvio begins to suspect that Christopher is starting to usurp his place in Tony's inner circle.

Christopher visits a construction site where crew members have no-work jobs, and Patsy indicates to Christopher that there are valuable fiber-optic cables which can be removed. Tony angrily reprimands Christopher for this, as the thefts might bring unwanted attention to their involvement. Later, despite Tony's orders, Silvio and Patsy steal floor tiles from the site. Jack Massarone complains to Tony, but Silvio deflects Tony's anger. An infuriated Christopher drives to the site and has a heated confrontation with Patsy.

At a dinner party, Ralphie makes an off-color joke about Johnny's wife Ginny, drawing laughter from all. Visiting Paulie in prison, Little Paulie repeats the joke. Paulie does not laugh.

Adriana now treats Danielle as her close friend and confidante. One evening at Adriana's club, Christopher, high on cocaine, is sitting on a sofa with the two women. As he kisses Adriana, he puts a hand on Danielle's thigh. Adriana is enraged, but when he claims Danielle took the initiative, Adriana chooses to believe him and cuts ties with Danielle.

The FBI decides to bring Adriana in and reveal Danielle's true identity as Agent Ciccerone. She is taken to meet with Chief Frank Cubitoso who threatens her with imprisonment for drug possession or punishment from Tony Soprano if she does not co-operate. Adriana vomits all over herself, the table, and the agents.

== Title reference ==
- The title refers to the way the mob assigns paid jobs at a construction site to workers who never have to show up but continue to be paid.
- The phrase refers to Meadow's not going to any of her summer internship interviews, and also to her thinking of suspending her college education.
- The phrase, used by airlines, also alludes to Meadow's decision not to fly to Europe.

== Production ==
- Robert Funaro (Eugene Pontecorvo) is no longer billed in the opening credits although he continues to appear on the show.

== Connections to prior episodes ==
- Silvio, Patsy, and Little Paulie discuss the no-show and no-work jobs for Paulie's crew. In "...To Save Us All From Satan's Power", Paulie tells Tony that Tommy Angeletti, a contractor for Ralphie's Esplanade Project, owes him $100,000 from betting on college basketball. Since Ralphie held out Angeletti for more money, he is unable to pay back his debt. Paulie requests that Tony give him the jobs as compensation.
- When Chris and Patsy get into a fight at the construction site, Chris warns Patsy that he didn't forget about his sniffing Adriana's underwear. Patsy responds that it wasn't him. This is a reference to the incident in "Second Opinion", wherein Paulie and Patsy barge into Chris and Adriana's apartment demanding their cut of Chris' score of designer shoes. While searching around, Chris spots Paulie, not Patsy, sniffing Adriana's underwear.
- While talking to Dr. Kobler, Meadow mentions that she was irritated by Junior's singing Italian ballads at Jackie Jr.'s wake, and the attendees' sentimental reactions (in "Army of One").
- Tony makes reference to Richie Aprile while talking to Janice, reminding her that "...I had to haul your last boyfriend out of your kitchen—in a Hefty bag." Tony had Christopher and Furio remove Richie's body from the kitchen of Janice's home after she shot and killed him in "The Knight in White Satin Armor"

== Cultural references ==
- Meadow claims to have spent the summer reading the Western canon, but Carmela says she saw her reading Mary Higgins Clark novels.
- When a black construction worker starts to call the police, Patsy derisively calls him Ralph Bunche—an African-American diplomat.
- Ralph shows Janice Faces of Death to her discomfort. When Tony sees the VHS, he sarcastically asks Janice if The Sound of Music had already been rented.
- Tony mentions Tommy Mottola when Janice discusses her record release.
- Meadow mentions that the director of the DVCAM film she plans on helping out with in Denmark "hangs out with Dogma" who received an honorable mention at the Winnipeg Film Festival—and in defending her travel plans tells Carmela to read Henry James.
- Christopher buys Adrianna Harry Winston diamonds, saying they have more carats (carrots) than Bugs Bunny.
- Patsy makes a joke about putting spores in the envelope, a reference to the 2001 anthrax attacks.

== Music ==
- The song played over the end credits is an instrumental remix of the title track off Radiohead's 2000 album Kid A.
- Robert & Johnny's "We Belong Together" (1958) is playing in the background as Tony and Christopher discuss the fiber-optics theft.
- The live rock band playing (and lip-syncing) their original song "You" in Adriana's club is the real-life Jersey group The Swingin' Neckbreakers.
