= Bergen Hill, Jersey City =

Populated place in Hudson County, New Jersey, US

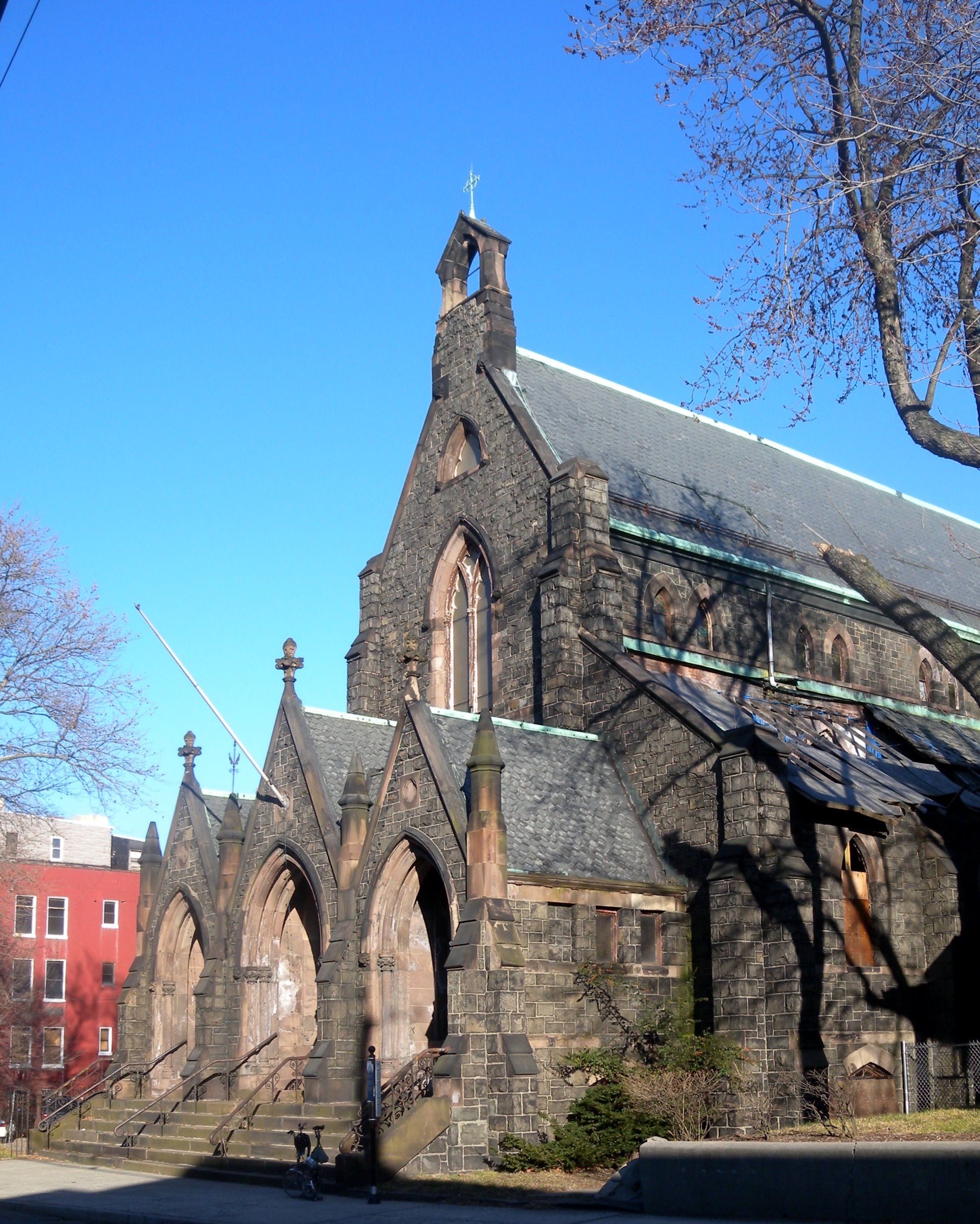
St. John's Episcopal on Summit Avenue

Bergen Hill is the name given to the emergence of the Hudson Palisades along the Bergen Neck peninsula in Hudson County, New Jersey and the inland neighborhood of Jersey City, New Jersey, where they rise from the coastal plain at the Upper New York Bay. The name is taken from the original 17th-century New Netherland settlement of Bergen, which the word berg in Dutch means "hills" and bergen means "place of safety".

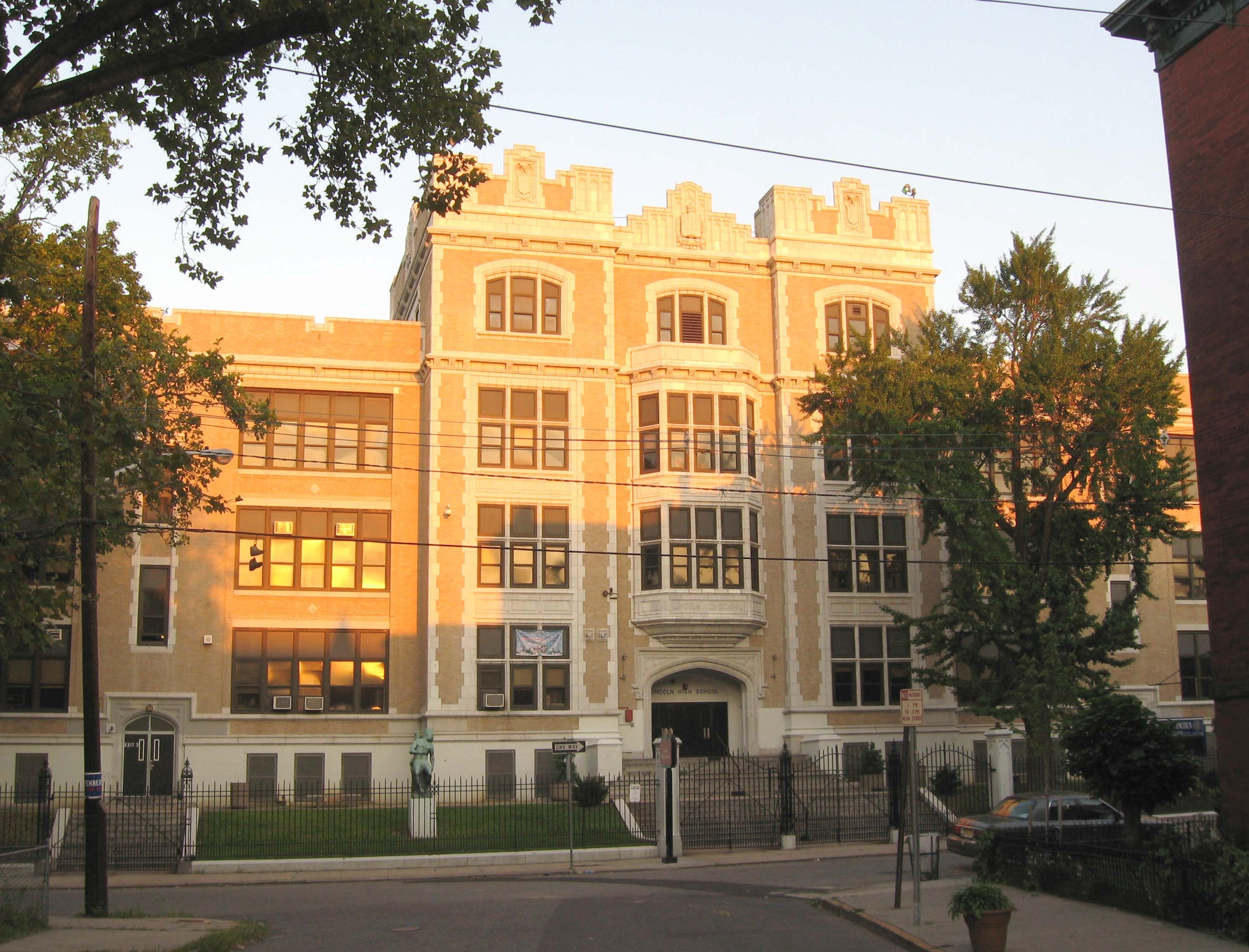
Lincoln High School

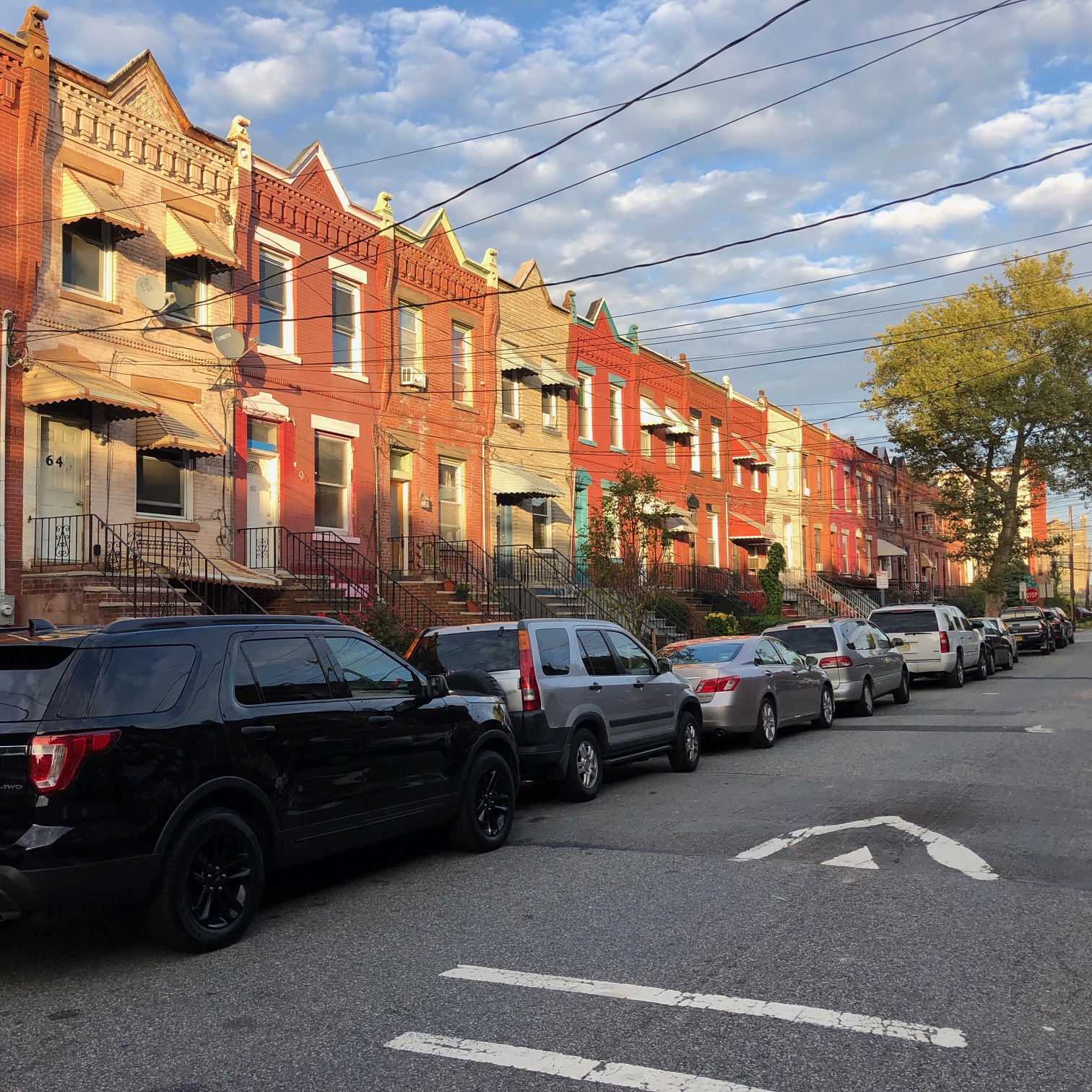
AstorPlace

Locally, Bergen Hill has sometimes been referred to colloquially as "The Hill" and was part of Bergen City, one of the municipalities that elected to merge with Jersey City in the 1860s, and is part of the section of the city known as Bergen-Lafayette. The neighborhood radiates from Communipaw Junction, at the intersection of Communipaw Avenue, Summit Avenue, and Grand Street where the toll house for the Bergen Point Plank Road was once situated. The avenues ascend the hill to the West Side, north to Five Corners, and south to Greenville. To the east is Communipaw-Lafayette and Liberty State Park. The Jersey City Redevelopment Agency has called the special improvement district along the commercial corridors of Monticello Avenue and MLK Drive the Jackson Hill Main Street

The Bergen Hill Historic District received an opinion of eligibility for New Jersey Register of Historic Places designation (ID#1481) in 1991. It includes Summit Avenue and side streets which feature a mix of late 19th/early 20th architecture that includes brick rowhouses, brownstones, Queen Anne style apartment buildings and private homes. At the foot of avenue is Library Hall, a renovated 1866 building that served as the town hall for Bergen Township then later as Bergen City before it was annexed by Jersey City in 1870. Library Hall is now residences. It travels north to the landmark St. John's Episcopal Church soon after coming in the neighborhood of the Beacon, site of the former Jersey City Medical Center, which since 2016 has been renovated and restored for adaptive reuse as an apartment complex. The neighborhoods' high school, Lincoln High School, is located on Crescent Avenue.

During the 19th century, former slaves reached Jersey City on one of the four main routes of the Underground Railroad that all converged in the city. The Hilton-Holden House on Clifton Place was a "station" for fugitive slaves to seek refuge and is one of the last remaining in Jersey City.

To the south Grand Street ascends along Arlington Park, at the top of which is located the St. Patrick's Parish and Buildings at Bramhall Avenue. (40°42′50″N 74°4′23″W). While not in the state historic district, this complex received its federal historic status in September 1980 and anchors the surrounding streets, some of which are lined with well-preserved or restored 19th-century rowhouses. MLK Drive, formerly Jackson Avenue, has long been a commercial street for the southern part of the neighborhood, and is the site of the Hudson Bergen Light Rail station of the same name.

The Claremont neighborhood lies south of Arlington Park, where before discontinuation of service in 1954, the Central Railroad of New Jersey maintained a station.

== Transportation ==
Buses travelling southbound through The Junction are the NJT 6, and NJT 81 through Greenville to Curries Woods, with the 81 continuing to Bayonne. On some trips on the NJT6 alternates it routes along the Lafayette Loop. Northbound the NJT6 travels to Journal Square, while the NJT81 travel through Downtown Jersey City to Exchange Place. On the top of the hill, at MLK Drive and Monticelo Avenue the NJT 87 runs south along to Curries Woods and north to Journal Square, Jersey City Heights, and Hudson Place (Hoboken). The nearest stations of the Hudson Bergen Light Rail are located along the southern periphery of the neighborhood at Garfield Avenue and MLK Drive on the West Side Branch.

== See also ==
- Ficken's Warehouse
