= Spaccanapoli (band) =

Italian musical group

Spaccanapoli, now known as Spakka-Neapolis 55, is a musical group from Naples.

== Formation and identity ==
The band was founded in 1999 by violinist and composer Antonio Fraioli and vocalist Monica Pinto. It was named after Spaccanapoli, a street that crosses the ancient city centre of Naples.

In 2004 the band changed its name to Spakka-Neapolis 55.

== Performances and recordings ==
In 2000 the band released the album Aneme Perze – Lost Souls on Peter Gabriel's label Real World Records.

In 2001 it opened two concerts given by Manu Chao in Genoa and Naples, and in September of the following year it opened two world premiere concerts for Peter Gabriel's album Up.

In 2003 the band won the Miroir Award (Prix Miroir) for World Music and Traditions at the Quebec City Summer Festival.

In June 2004 it performed again with Peter Gabriel in Genoa.

In 2009 the band released the album Janus, on which Alim Qasimov performed as a special guest.

In 2011 the band was featured singing "Vesuvio" on John Turturro's "Passione", a documentary about the music of Naples. The song received excellent reviews.

== Television and theatre ==
In 2002, the American TV series The Sopranos used the song "Vesuvio" from the album Aneme Perze – Lost Souls in the episode "The Weight".

In 2005, the music of Spakka-Neapolis 55 was used by New York's Theater for a New Audience for a show entitled Souls of Naples, written by Eduardo De Filippo and directed by Roman Paska. The play was staged at the Teatro Mercadante in Naples, in New York and in Paris.

In 2007 the songs "O'Mare", "Santa Notte" and "Mmiezo a Festa" were used in the first two episodes of the TV series "The Long Way Down", produced by the BBC.

== Discography ==
- 2000: Aneme Perze – Lost Souls
- 2009: Janus
