= Monster Swamp =

- Preacher episode
- Tulip discovers Cassidy's secret.
- Episode no.: Season 1 Episode 4
- Directed by: Craig Zisk
- Written by: Sara Goodman
- Cinematography by: John Grillo
- Editing by: Tyler L. Cook
- Original air date: June 19, 2016
- Running time: 42 minutes

Guest appearances
- Jackie Earle Haley as Odin Quincannon; Ricky Mabe as Miles Person; Nathan Darrow as John Custer; Ashley Aufderheide as Young Tulip; Dominic Ruggieri as Young Jesse

Episode chronology
← Previous "The Possibilities"	Next → "South Will Rise Again"

"Monster Swamp" is the fourth episode of the supernatural drama television series Preacher, which originally aired on AMC in the United States on June 19, 2016. The episode was written by Sara Goodman and directed by Craig Zisk.

Cassidy (Joseph Gilgun) tries to tell Jesse (Dominic Cooper) about Fiore (Tom Brooke) and DeBlanc (Anatol Yusef), though it falls on deaf ears as Jesse is distracted by the thought of rebooting All Saints Congregational, wanting more visitors. He later converts atheist Odin Quincannon (Jackie Earle Haley) to Christianity, using his power in front of the entire congregation to achieve that goal. Angry at the death of a woman, Tulip (Ruth Negga) carries out a form of vigilante justice, but the consequences are not expected as she mistakenly throws Cassidy out of a window, only to discover him to be an immortal vampire.

"Monster Swamp" was received mostly positively by critics, who listed its acting (particularly of Dominic Cooper, Joseph Gilgun and Jackie Earle Haley), the bizarre opening sequence, Odin and Jesse's confrontation, and Jesse's sermon as being the high points of the episode. The episode garnered a Nielsen rating of 0.4 in the 18–49 demographic, translating to 1.14 million viewers.

== Plot ==
=== Flashback ===
A young Jesse Custer prepares the All Saints chapel for services. He later listens to his father, John Custer (Nathan Darrow), deliver a sermon to his congregation. Jesse smokes with his friends, including a young Tulip O'Hare (Ashley Aufderheide). John admonishes him and whips him in front of his friends, emphasizing that the others look to him for guidance. Later, Jesse's father wakes him in the middle of the night and takes him to Quincannon Meat & Power. Jesse waits in the hall while John goes into Quincannon's office. While waiting, Jesse steals an ashtray. Shouts are heard inside and John walks out. "Denounce him!" Quincannon (Jackie Earle Haley) yells after him.

Back in the truck, John tells Jesse that some people just can't be saved.

=== Present ===
Lacey, a prostitute from Toadvine Whorehouse, flees through Annville and a field on a foggy night. Clive, one of Odin Quincannon's men, chases her with a gun, catches up with her, and shoots her with a paint gun. Suddenly, Lacey falls into a sinkhole and dies. The next day, as her body is hoisted out of the pit, Quincannon—owner of the property— gives a speech to his men, the girls, and Tulip (Ruth Negga), warning them to be more careful. Tulip is outraged at their apathy toward Lacey's death.

Meanwhile, Cassidy (Joseph Gilgun) tries to tell Jesse about Fiore (Tom Brooke) and DeBlanc (Anatol Yusef) and warns him to flee Annville; his advice falls on deaf ears. Jesse visits Emily (Lucy Griffiths) to suggest raffling off a flat-screen TV to attract more people to church and alludes to a scheme that will boost attendance. Cassidy visits Fiore and DeBlanc at the Sundowner Motel where, in exchange for cash, he promises to convince Jesse to meet with them. Fiore expresses his doubts about the situation and takes out a strange-looking old telephone; DeBlanc, however forbids him from using it, saying they will be punished for coming down without permission.

Quincannon and Annville Mayor Miles (Ricky Mabe) discuss the problem of sinkholes, as well as Miles's recent meeting with the Green Acre Group, a sustainable farming company. Miles gives Quincannon a Green Acre brochure and suggests he consider a partnership, given that local tax revenues have decreased 58 percent in 10 years. Quincannon urinates on the brochure.

Emily arrives home with the new TV for Sunday's raffle and relieves Miles of babysitting duties. She agrees to have a drink with him when he points out how hard she works for everyone, especially Jesse. In her kitchen, Emily reminds him that she's never going to be with him. She then removes her pants and warns him to leave before morning.

The prostitutes and Quincannon's crew gather at Toadvine to remember Lacey. Tulip and Clive trade angry words. Mosie offers Clive a free hour on the house to ease the situation and advises Tulip to watch her temper. Tulip marches upstairs and whips a man who she thinks is Clive, causing him to fall through a window. When Clive comes to the bedroom door, Tulip realizes she attacked the wrong man. Down below, Cassidy grunts as blood spurts from his neck. Tulip cradles Cassidy in a car as a prostitute drives them to the hospital. She apologizes profusely and chastises herself for having anger issues. Cassidy asks her to kiss him, which she does. At the hospital, Tulip urgently begs a nurse to get a doctor only to turn around and find that Cassidy is gone. She follows a trail of blood and discovers Cassidy slurping blood from a bag.

Jesse visits Quincannon's office where they're building a model of the Alamo together. Jesse invites Quincannon to his Sunday service. Quincannon, who is an atheist, declines. Jesse tells Quincannon that if he comes to church on Sunday and does not leave a Christian, he'll give Quincannon his father's 20 hectares of land — the biggest plot in Annville that Quincannon doesn't own. On Sunday, Jesse stands before a packed house and tells the congregation that the world is turning to shit — and that it's all their fault. He vows to bring them back to God one by one and asks Quincannon to serve God. Quincannon refuses and starts to leave. As everyone watches, Jesse puts his hand on Quincannon's shoulder and employs the Word of God. "Serve God," he commands. "Of course I will, yes sir," Quincannon says. The room erupts in whispers.

Fiore and DeBlanc wait in the motel room. The phone contraption begins to ring. They stare motionless at the phone as it rings and rings.

== Production ==
=== Writing ===
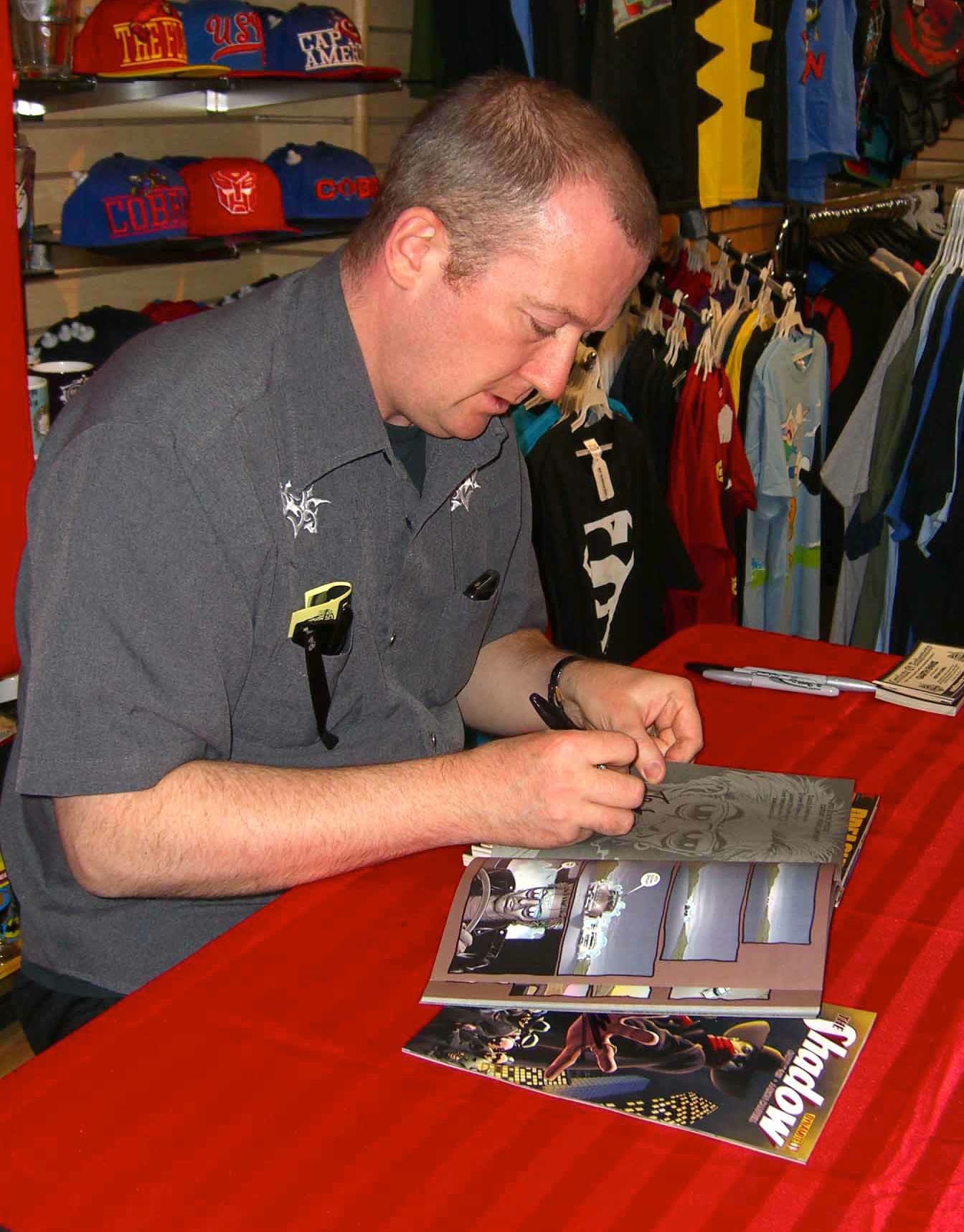
Preacher co-creator Garth Ennis reviews each and every script of the series, responding to Sam Catlin's team of writers.

"Monster Swamp" was written by Sara Goodman. Some elements in the episode are based on the first seven issues in the Preacher series, Gone to Texas, of which the script was first read and reviewed by Preacher co-creator Garth Ennis, as with the other episodes of the series. It also adapts, or at least provides allusions to Jesse's father John Custer from Until the End of the World, in the form of various flashback sequences, as well as from Salvation with Odin Quincannon.

In the Preacher Insider Podcast featurette published by AMC following the airing of the episode, "Monster Swamp" writer Sara Goodman spoke of the overall theme of the episode, and Jesse's decision to use his power, stating "Well I think this episode, in terms of moving forward, was really about [Jesse] embracing his new power and his intention to use it to achieve his goal of being the preacher in Annville." "Monster Swamp" director, Craig Zisk agreed with Goodman's statement, believing "It felt like Jesse had a very clear mission in this episode, versus the conflict we've seen him have in the other episodes [...] And now it feels like he has a solid understanding of what it does and what it is; and now he's using it for good, in his mind, to bring more people into the church and to save the people of the town, so to speak." Zisk speaks of it as being the first moment in which Jesse takes ownership of this newly acquire ability.

Goodman stated of the flashback sequence that "[...] what we decided to do in terms of using the flashbacks is try to solidify what his mission was - the promise he made to his dad, why he's here as a preacher, knowing that he's come from a much darker place and that he has this dark side in him and so why he's fighting to be good, why he's come back to this town, and what his mission is for the town. So even if he doesn't know exactly what the power is yet, I think that this episode is really about him embracing it and using it to achieve that goal, and by using Quincannon." Zisk spoke of the "amazing pieces with [Quincannon] in this episode, "[...] The scene when they're building the little Alamo was such a powerful scene in terms of Jesse deciding to use his power or not use his power. He knew he had it in his back pocket when he walked in the door. Of course, he knew he was going to get the result that he wanted but it was how he was going to get it. Could he do it the old fashioned way by just talking it through and hopefully convincing Quincannon or was he going to have to use the power [...] I think that was a real struggle for Jesse throughout the scene [...]

Assistant editor Monica Daniel said, "One thing I love about that scene, and something me and [Tyler] talkeand about while he was cutting it, is its a very dialogue heavy scene. In the script, you see the dialogue and then once you shoot it that's when you're trying to get all that subtext across, and its just so well one. The whole time they're having this conversation it's kind of like a battle of wills with each other. They're actually putting together that model and Quincannon's painting the whole time [...] so we went into that trying to get all those little moments in there and translating it from the script."

Of the Battle of Wills scene between Jesse and Quincannon, Zisk mentions that "I think there's a lot more power if you're not facing off with each other and that they had such strong opinions of where they stood in terms of whether their whole theories on religion, god and what that influences in their life and not to have this face to face where they're sitting next to each other just going after each other, it's a lot easier to be distracted by something and having that conversation and you can see they're both holding back. They're doing it with a little bit of a smile on their face, they're into their work but as much as their concentrating on [the Alamo] & that other stuff [...] their really not concentrating on that. They're trying to figure out ... they're sizing each other up. They're going to be the two powers in this town [...]" Goodman notes that the choice of both men building the Alamo was very purposeful, "It's the definition of Texas lore, but it's also an unwinnable battle, and their recreating it. So for them to be in masters of their own universe, I mean that's what they are doing [...] In the writing and the breaking of the episode, we're very aware of the world we're putting them in."

Shortly after the airing of "Monster Swamp", AMC released a featurette titled "Inside Preacher: Monster Swamp" which went into greater detail with the cast and creators to discuss Cassidy's dealings with DeBlanc and Fiore and why Jesse's so focused on converting Annville's biggest sinner, Odin Quincannon. Showrunner Sam Catlin was interviewed for the segment, and stated "Cassidy's sort of figured out that DeBlanc and Fiore aren't vampire vigilantes. Now he realises what they want is Jesse's power." Catlin then acknowledges that Cassidy is rather curious of the two fellows, stating, "At first he just wants to know a little bit about more about what it is that they want and what are they after; and sort of over the course of that scene, he realises that they don't seem they have all the answers."

Joseph Gilgun spoke of his character's interactions with DeBlanc and Fiore, while also being rather critical of Jesse's flippant approach, to an extent with his abilities; though speaking first of the government agents, Gilgun states, "I think it's really funny because Cassidy's saying 'Look I don't know what the bloody hell they are. They could be androids [...] could be anything'. Though he also mentions, "The one thing they do have is a good instinct for people and who they are." He concludes by making mention of Jesse's trivial approach, "He's bartering with something that doesn't belong to him and he has no idea how dangerous it is."

Sam Catlin additionally spoke about the introduction of Young Jesse in the series, involving the flashback sequence with his father, with Catlin saying, "We start to learn a little bit about what it was like for Jesse as a young boy, son of John Custer. And we flashback to an encounter John had with Odin Quincannon when Jesse was just a kid. As Jesse's grown up and come back to this town, [Quincannon]'s been sort of the ultimate white whale of sin. He's a professed atheist; he's also the most powerful man in town, he basically runs Annville." Catlin concluded his segment of the featurette by speaking of the present timeline with Jesse and Odin, with Catlin saying, "Jesse's trying to coax Odin to come to church, just this one Sunday. For Jesse, he's the ultimate challenge, 'If I can show the town that I can bring Odin Quincannon to God then everyone else will follow'." Catlin continues, "Jesse pros him and asks him 'what about Hell? aren't you worried about going to Hell?' But he turns the tables on Jesse, he's like 'I'm not the one that's worried about Hell, you're the one that's worried about Hell' And that's the turn of the scene."

In an interview with AMC, Anatol Yusef, who portrays DeBlanc, spoke of Cassidy in which he remarks, "I think he's slowly figuring out that we might be idiots, cos' we give him anything he needs.", while suggesting, "I think DeBlanc thinks that however it plays out, they're getting closer to Jesse. Closer to the power." when speaking of his own character. Additionally, Yusef concludes by making mention of DeBlanc's feelings towards Jesse being the host of this entity, but more so that he was chosen, to which Yusef begins to remark, "DeBlanc doesn't believe it's a true connection because he's seen this thing be inside people – whether it chooses them or they choose it – and it's temporary. Whoever has it isn't necessarily special… DeBlanc thinks that, ultimately, it doesn't belong to humans and it belongs to these angel janitors of the other world. I always felt that DeBlanc and the angels looked at humans as silly and wasteful. I always thought of him like George Carlin in Bill & Ted's Excellent Adventure (1989) with his stance on humanity and an other-worldly presence. DeBlanc's viewpoint is complicated and while we're experiencing DeBlanc, he is human."

Dominic Cooper concludes the "Inside Preacher: Monster Swamp" featurette by discussing Jesse's confidence in employing his ability upon Quincannon, "He would never risk losing the church to this man if he wasn't fully convince that this power worked." Though Cooper also speaks of ethical breaches in Jesse's decision: "While you're watching this unfold you're discovering that this person is using this in utterly the wrong way. And people are in awe of it. From that moment on wards, he changes dramatically. It's working but he's enjoying it and he's getting the wrong type of pleasure with what seems to be quite a spiritual moment." Ruth Negga, in an interview with Revelist, insisted on putting forth the importance of Tulip, to which Negga states, "She defies expectations of badass women and stereotypes ... It's a relief to see a woman with all those colors and all those nuances and fucked up-ness, because I think for too long we've limited that to the male protagonist — being allowed to have ugly parts of themselves, or flaws."

=== Casting ===
"Monster Swamp" saw the reintroduction of Frances Lee McCain, Ricky Mabe, Alex Knight and Barbie Robertson, who portrayed Mosie, Miles, Clive and Lacey, respectively, last appearing in the episode "See", with episode featuring the death of Robertson's recurring character Lacey. Catherine Haun returned to portray Ms. Oatlash, who was last seen in "The Possibilities".

The episode saw the return of special guest star Jackie Earle Haley reprising his role as the villainous Odin Quincannon. The names of actors Graham McTavish, Derek Wilson and Ian Colletti are featured in the opening title sequence, though they don't appear in the episode. This episode marks the second appearance of Nathan Darrow, best known for his role of Edward Meechum in House of Cards. "Monster Swamp" features the first appearance of guest star Ashley Aufderheide, who portrays a young Tulip O'Hare.

=== Filming ===
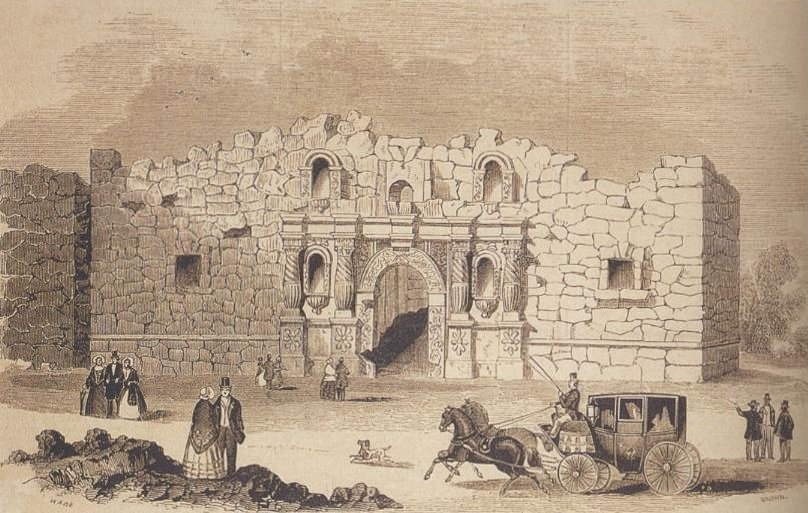
The Battle of the Alamo of the Texas Revolution was one of the inspirations for the "Battle of Wills" between Jesse and Odin.

"Monster Swamp" was directed by Craig Zisk, a first time director for Preacher. According to Sara Goodman, the episodic title is an allusion to Annville being a monster swamp, and at the head of that monster swamp is Odin Quincannon.

Zisk spoke about filming certain scenes of the episode, the segment where Tulip mistakenly takes out Cassidy through the window of Toadvine Whorehouse, in the behind the scenes featurette published by AMC after the airing of the episode. Winant briefly mentions the layout of that particular scene whilst filming, to which he states, "Cassidy's coming out the window, and revealing Tulip looking down at him. Where we see Cassidy now has a piece of glass stuck in his neck and is bleeding."

Joseph Gilgun was interviewed for the "Monster Swamp" segment and spoke of the creation of the window sequence, which primarily involved practical prosthetics. Gilgun spoke of the filming preparation on set of "Monster Swamp": "There's teams of people working for months and months in the buildup [...] [Brende] will be throwing himself through a window for the last 2 or 3 weeks in preparation for this one moment. So he won't actually be going through a genuine glass window, it's sugar glass so when it goes through it shatters." Stuntman Solomon Brende mentions the construction of the set, wherein he states, "It's a second story window, but they built a deck underneath so it's actually going to be about a five & a half or six foot drop out the window."

Gilgun went on to describe more specifically the usage of such practical prosthetics, remarking, "They've took a mold of my neck. You could imagine the silicone looking wrap around my neck. Built in there is a squib, which is basically a tube that runs down my top so that this piece of glass that's wedged in there they can just put some pressure on his blood pack and it pumps blood out of my neck. It looks incredible." Make-up artist Mike Smithson of KNB EFX was also interviewed for the "Making Of Preacher: Monster Swamp" segment, with him noting, "This is the spot where he's taken the shrapnel [Smithson pointing to Gilgun's neck], and underneath is a little reservoir for some thin blood. Then we hook this up to our pressure spot [...]" Ruth Negga spoke of her combat preparation for the scene with Cassidy, wherein she states, "I've been training with John Koyama, who's our stunt master, and he's been teaching me how to use a baton lethally. I'm using actually a rubber prop [...]"

"Monster Swamp" editor Tyler Cook spoke of Zisk's direction of the episode, particularly praising his choice for his wide shots, to which continued by saying, "The Alamo is a stand-in for Annville and here are these two imposing figures who are literally standing over the town [...] Especially that high birds eye view at the very end where you just watch them go back to their work and it's like yeah they are planning the future of this town together and apart and how are those going to intersect? And it's a very power image for a lot of very different reasons, so I thought you chose your shots incredibly well." With Sara Goodman finishing it off by making the remark of "I think [Zisk] did an incredible job in terms of visually [...] giving us the horror trope and at the same time letting us see the town and where the value system is or isn't."

=== Cinematography ===
"Monster Swamp" was shot with a Sony F55 in 4K raw in a distributed aspect ratio of 16:9 by John Grillo. For lenses, Grillo uses Panavision PVintage primes, which are rehoused Ultra Speeds from the 1970s. He also uses Angenieux Optimo lenses, including the 15-40, 28-76, 45-120 and 24-290mm. He used a Tiffen Black Pro-Mist 1/8 filter in front of the lens, as it "helps take some of the edge off the sharpness of the sensor. We have some characters who wear prosthetics, so it definitely helps."

=== Visual effects ===
Kevin Lingenfelser was the overall Visual Effects Supervisor and visual effects company FuseFX worked on most of the visual effects for "Monster Swamp".

=== Marketing ===
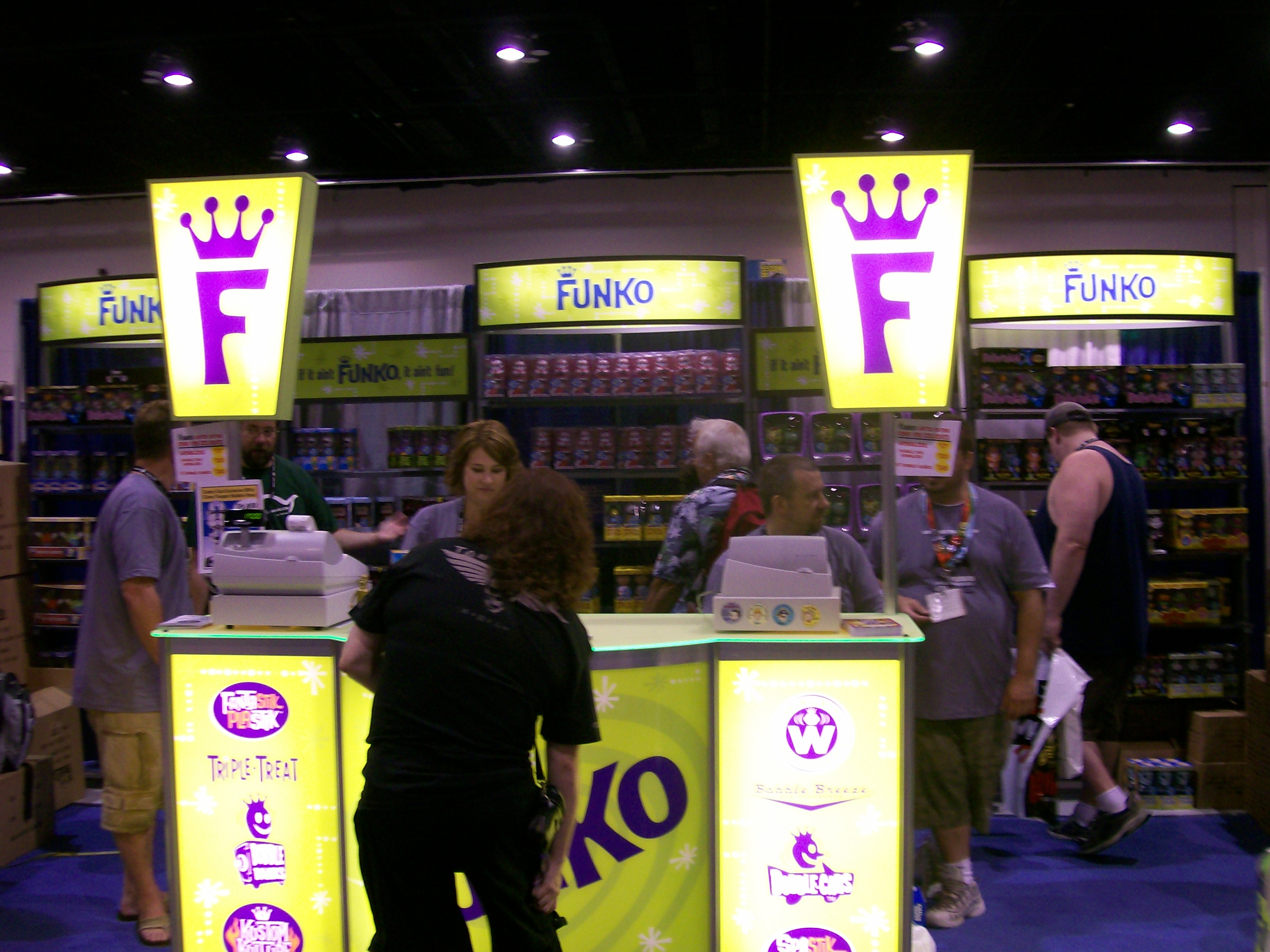
Ruth Negga was very critical of Funko's omission of Tulip from their upcoming Preacher figures series.

Prior to Preacher's public release, AMC provided the first four episodes of the season 1 for review, only available to critics, which included "Pilot", "See", "The Possibilities" and "Monster Swamp". Shortly after the airing of the episode, on June 13, AMC released a selection of extras for "The Possibilities", including photos, an interview with actor Tom Brooke, interviews with the crew as well as a making of behind the scenes. On June 13, 2016, AMC promoted the following of the Preacher magazine on Flipboard, where the latest in full episodes, sneak peeks, behind the scenes moments, exclusive cast interviews can be accessed through a mobile device.

On June 14, 2016, Madman Mike Allred brought his retro-pop style to the latest custom Preacher comic cover. The cover features the trio of Jesse, Cassidy and Tulip slyly celebrating having cut themselves free from the hands that have been pulling their strings, with covers by such artists as Preacher co-creator Steve Dillon and Preacher cover artist Glenn Fabry being available when singing up to the Preacher Insiders Club. On June 17, 2016, shortly before the release the Preacher episode, Monster Swamp, artist Dustin Nguyen created the latest custom Preacher comic cover featuring Cassidy after having recently fed on something.

On June 18, 2016, Negga, in an interview with Revelist's Shaunna Murphy, expressed her criticism of company Funko who left out co-main character Tulip O'Hare in their Preacher Funko Pop vinyl figures that were recently unveiled to which the company included the lineup of Jesse, Cassidy, and B-character Eugene; with Negga herself stating, "It's so narrow-minded ... but also, are they mental?" she said. "Women have money. They're missing the point; they're missing the beat. If just being a compassionate human being doesn't appeal to them, surely a dollar must appeal to them. Use your brains. I can't believe it." Negga continued, "Who makes these decisions, in what world do they live in?" she continued. "I surround myself with loads of different people, varied, but ... they're mostly liberal. So you forget that there are people who do think like that. It's a good thing to remember. All these battles you think you've won, they're not won. That complacency. It's very easy to become complacent when you think 'Oh no, I've got this part. Black president. Female president, maybe.' But behind that, you have to remember to stay vigilant against that kind of narrow-mindedness."

On June 20, 2016, Preacher's "Monster Swamp" became available to stream or purchase on AMC.com's website, iTunes, Amazon, Google Play, Xbox Video and more. On June 24, 2016, New York Times best-selling author, David W. Mack has put his famous water-color spin on the new Preacher cover, with Mack spin placing Jesse Custer between wings of Heaven and the fire of Hell.

== Music ==
During the final church scene, with Jesse and Quincannon, Dave Porter includes a distinct music element, which was the Heisenberg cue from Breaking Bad.

== Reception ==
=== Ratings ===
"Monster Swamp" was viewed by 1.14 million American households on its initial viewing, which was slightly less than the previous week's rating of 1.75 million viewers for the episode "The Possibilities". The episode also acquired a 0.4 rating in the 18–49 demographic, making it the eleventh highest rated show on cable television of the night.

=== Critical reception ===
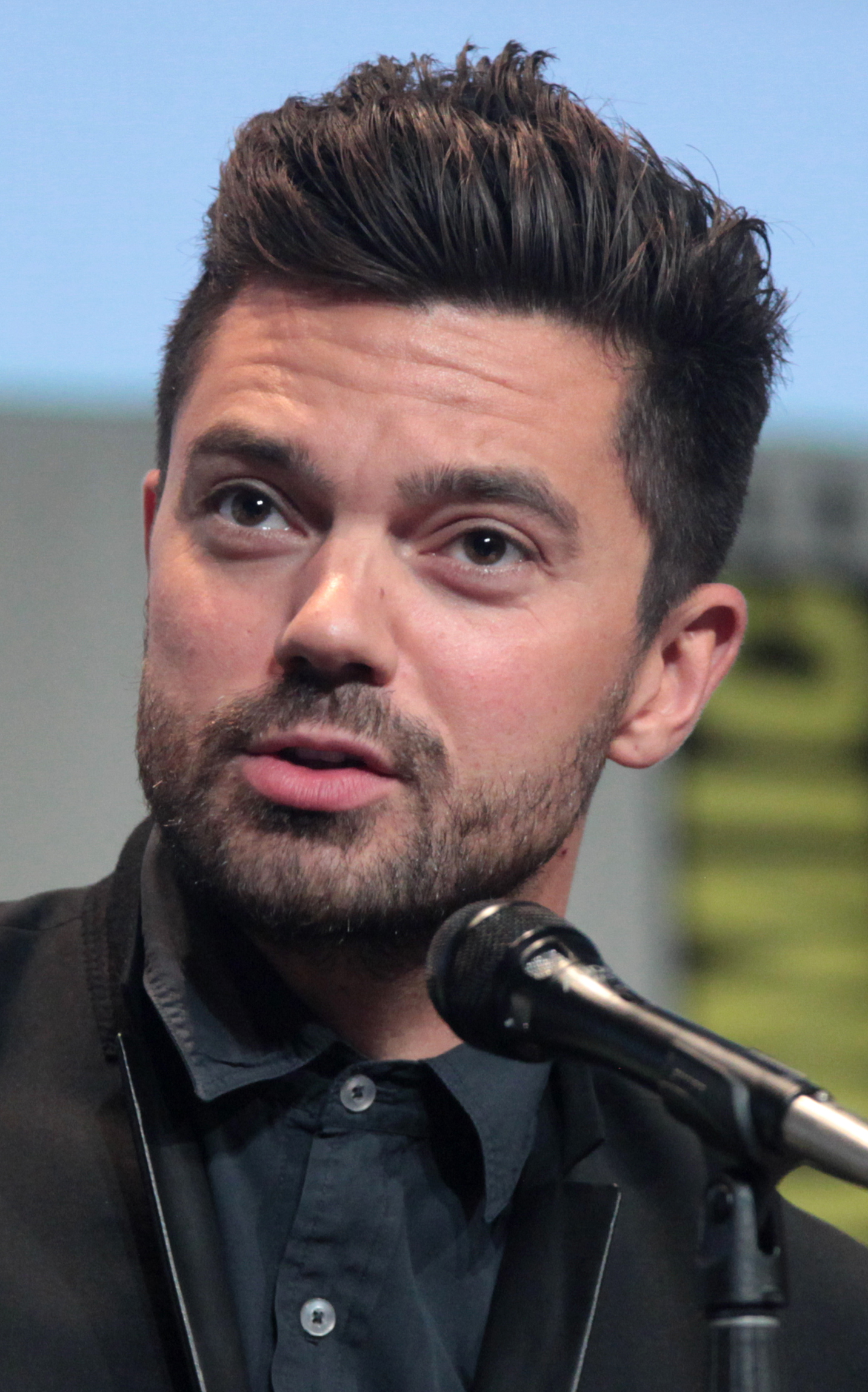
Critics praised Cooper's portrayal of Jesse in "Monster Swamp."

"Monster Swamp" was received mostly positively by critics, who listed its acting (particularly for Dominic Cooper, Joseph Gilgun and Jackie Earle Haley), the bizarre opening "hunting" sequence, Odin and Jesse's confrontation, and Jesse's sermon as being the high points of the episode. Review aggregator Rotten Tomatoes reports that 83% of critics gave the episode a positive review, based on 18 reviews with an average score of 7.3/10, with the site's consensus stating, "A fairly sedated episode, "Monster Swamp" still packs an absurd punch, a key character breakthrough, and some much needed screen time for its growing cast of supporting players."

Eric Goldman of IGN reacted positively to "Monster Swamp", remarking that: "The fourth episode of Preacher began to bring Odin into the main storyline in a bigger way, helping to better solidify his role in the series. The glimpses at Jesse's past with his father were also intriguing, even as it seems the show is making some notable deviations from the comic book in terms of Jesse's backstory. Right now, a lot of the odd events and offbeat characters are existing in their own scenarios that sometimes cross over, but as the season continues, it feels like more and more overlapping will begin to occur." Goldman gave the episode a score of 8.4 out of 10. In a B+ grade review, The A.V. Club journalist Zack Handlen summarized, "There are maybe half a dozen different storylines going on, some of them more obviously relevant than others. But each of those storylines basically make sense, and a few of them end up going in surprising, and satisfying, directions." Darren Franich of Entertainment Weekly heralded "Monster Swamp" by remarking: "Preacher the TV show has very gradually moved these characters together -- and it's interesting to consider what these two devils (Odin & Cassidy) might do to their mutual friend Jesse Custer."

Eric Thurm of The Guardian simply wrote, "Quincannon finally comes into his own a bit as a character in this episode." Alan Sepinwall of HitFix praised the piece by stating, "Overall, it's a more successful than last week's episode was at trying to pivot from the entertaining incoherence of the first two installments into something more sustainable as a narrative." Mark Rozeman, for Paste Magazine, wrote, ""Monster Swamp" provides yet another grounded Preacher entry, albeit one that looks to more clearly push (however intermittently) both the characters and plot forward to the next level." Sean T. Collins of The New York Observer appraised the episode as "as wild and intoxicating as ever. But it's a shallow high, with a hell of a crash coming down."

James White of Empire spoke most highly of Cooper and Earle Haley's performances, with him writing: "Two great scenes, in the office and the church, give Cooper and Jackie Earle Haley a lot to do, and their connection is sketched efficiently.", while White also remarked that "Cassidy and Tulip are still the most entertaining elements in the show". Scott Meslow of Vulture, gave "Monster Swamp" a three-star rating and said: "Preacher doesn't hesitate to remind us that Annville, Texas, is a wretched, miserable place, but the limits of its depravity remain an open question." Kimber Myers of The Playlist highly praised "Monster Swmp", commenting that "Other than its bonkers, WTF first minutes and a requisite crazy scene with vampire Cassidy, episode four of Preacher is its quietest yet."

Kevin Yeoman of ScreenRant criticized the episode in his review, writing, "Like the hours before it, "Monster Swamp" is loaded with memorable moments that serve the characters but not necessarily the plot." However, Yeoman noted, "With the possible exception of Tulip, no one else has matched the energy Gilgun brings to his scenes [...]" He highly praised Gilgun by stating, "[...] Gilgun's animated and engaging performance – is almost too appealing, too much fun to be around, and as a result, some of the other characters pale in comparison." SFX Magazine's Anthony John Agnello remarked that, "Monster Swamp doesn't fix Preacher's Jesse Custer problem, nor does it actually establish a coherent core plot." However, John Agnello felt that "Odin Quincannon's presence is so strong here that those issues at least don't overshadow the solid performances within.
