= The Possibilities (Preacher) =

- Preacher episode
- Episode no.: Season 1 Episode 3
- Directed by: Scott Winant
- Written by: Chris Kelley
- Cinematography by: John Grillo
- Editing by: Hunter M. Via
- Original air date: June 12, 2016
- Running time: 42 minutes

Guest appearances
- Jackie Earle Haley as Odin Quincannon; Julie Dretzin as Dany; Ptolemy Slocum as Linus; Gianna Lepera as Tracy Loach; Bonita Friedericy as Terri Loach

Episode chronology
← Previous "See"	Next → "Monster Swamp"

"The Possibilities" is the third episode of the supernatural drama television series, Preacher. It originally aired on AMC in the United States on June 12, 2016. The episode was written by Chris Kelley and directed by Scott Winant.

Tulip (Ruth Negga) meets a woman named Dany (Julie Dretzin) in Houston, Texas and receives a slip of paper with the address of the enigmatic Carlos, with Tulip intending Jesse to aid her in confronting and killing the man who ruined their lives. Jesse (Dominic Cooper) tests the limits of his newly found abilities of persuasion and finally understands the nature of his abilities when Donnie (Derek Wilson) confronts Custer with a gun, with Jesse later holding control over him. Cassidy (Joseph Gilgun) tells Jesse of the possibilities of his abilities, while discovering the true nature of government agents Fiore (Tom Brooke) and DeBlanc (Anatol Yusef); subsequently ending with a quasi-partnership between the mysterious two and the vampire. The episodic title is a reference to a speech given by Cassidy convincing Jesse about imagining the different possibilities of what he can do with his power.

"The Possibilities" received mostly praise from critics, who noted Jesse's interaction with Donnie, Cassidy learning the truth about Fiore and DeBlanc, and Tulip's performance with the cop as being the high points of the episode. The episode garnered a Nielsen rating of 0.7 in the 18–49 demographic, translating to 1.75 million viewers.

== Plot ==
Tulip (Ruth Negga) meets a woman named Dany (Julie Dretzin) in Houston, Texas and hands over the stolen map. In return, Dany gives her a slip of paper with an address. In a flashback, a car zooms past Tulip in an alleyway as an alarm blares nearby. Back in the present, Tulip tells Dany that was the day she lost everything — including her relationship with Jesse. Afterwards, Dany sits behind a mysterious Man in White in a pop-up movie theater and hands him the map. He dismisses her. The Man in White leaves the theater.

At the Sundowner Motel, Sheriff Root interrogates Fiore (Tom Brooke) and DeBlanc (Anatol Yusef). They explain that "something" got loose and ended up in Annville. When Sheriff Root (W. Earl Brown) asks if they're talking about an escaped prisoner, they say yes. Sheriff Root bemoans the state of humanity. After Sheriff Root leaves, Fiore suggests they try using the can again on Jesse, revealing an assortment of guns. At the Loach residence, Mrs. Loach (Bonita Friedericy) tells Emily that Tracy's (Gianna Lepera) eyes opened after Jesse prayed with her.

Donnie (Derek Wilson) walks his son, Chris (Thomas Barbusca), to the bus stop and tells Chris not to worry about noises coming from his parents' bedroom. Donnie adds that adults' relationships can be "complicated." Chris apologizes for ratting out Donnie to Jesse and says he attacked a boy who mocked Donnie for getting beat up by Jesse. Linus (Ptolemy Slocum) picks up a line of kids in his school bus. He smiles at the young girl he once desired and asks her name—his memory of the girl having been wiped out by Jesse. The kids on the bus erupt in squeals when they see Donnie, mimicking the sound Donnie made when Jesse beat him up. Donnie hollers at them.

At church, Cassidy (Joseph Gilgun) answers a knock at the front door and finds a coffin with the body of Ted. Emily (Lucy Griffiths) tells Cassidy to handle the body. Cassidy grabs the van keys and sees Jesse (Dominic Cooper) sitting in the common room. Jesse tries out his new power on Cassidy and barks out a list of commands. Cassidy's excited about Jesse's new power.

A cop pulls Tulip over for speeding and asks her to step out of the car. The officer catches sight of a ring Tulip's slipped onto her finger, prompting him to ask where she served. He lightens up as she lies about her time in the military. Tulip explains she was speeding because she's desperate to help a friend who's been making bad life decisions. The cop lets her go.

At Quincannon Meat & Power, Ms. Oatlash, the receptionist, leaves an envelope on Odin Quincannon's desk. At church, Cassidy brainstorms explanations for Jesse's superpower and asks what it feels like. Jesse describes it as "all of God's creation inside of me." At the motel, Fiore and DeBlanc are outfitted in helmets and bulletproof vests, ready to deal with Jesse. In Quincannon's office, Donnie reads a letter from the owner of a company called Green Acre. Donnie offers to beat up the owner. Quincannon (Jackie Earle Haley) does not reply but tells Donnie to clear his lunch tray. Donnie struggles to pick up the tray with his one good arm. "A right-hand man with no right hand," Quincannon says.

Cassidy cremates Ted's body. As he returns with Ted's ashes, he sees Fiore and DeBlanc. Jesse drives down the road, with Tulip pulling up next to him, showing Jesse the address that Dany gave her. In a flashback, Jesse stands over a dead security guard whom he's shot in the head, as an alarm sounds in the background. Tulip screams at the getaway car as it speeds away. In the present, Tulip proposes they kill Carlos. Jesse and Tulip drive off together.

At night, Fiore and DeBlanc walk toward the church, armed with guns. Cassidy runs them over with the van, killing them. Cassidy looks at the bodies and recognizes them as the men he killed in the chainsaw fight. Believing them to be clones, he heads back to the church to find clean-up supplies. Inside, Cassidy runs into Fiore and DeBlanc. Before he can kill them again, they explain that they have come for Jesse, not him.

Tulip fills up at a gas station. Jesse wanders off to the bathroom. In the bathroom, Donnie sneaks up on Jesse with a gun, but Jesse tests his power on Donnie, who obeys his every command. On Jesse's orders, Donnie puts the gun in his mouth and pulls back the hammer. Jesse now understands how his power works. He tells Donnie to leave. Back at the car, Jesse tells Tulip he changed his mind. Despite her protests, he walks away leaving her at the gas station.

At the church, DeBlanc tells Cassidy that people will die if they do not retrieve what is inside Jesse. Cassidy asks what they want to do with it, and DeBlanc says they do not want to do anything with it, as it must never be used. Cassidy asks what branch of government they are from, and Fiore replies that they are from heaven. Outside, Cassidy tells Fiore and DeBlanc that he will talk to Jesse about their mission and convince Jesse to come to them. At Sheriff Root's house, Eugene (Ian Colletti) tells his father about Tracy opening her eyes and suggests they pay a visit to the Loach house. Sheriff Root warns Eugene to stay away.

The next day, Jesse recites his eulogy for Ted to only Emily in the church graveyard. In a nearby field, the lid on a vent flies open, emitting a gas, before it closes shut again.

== Production ==
=== Writing ===
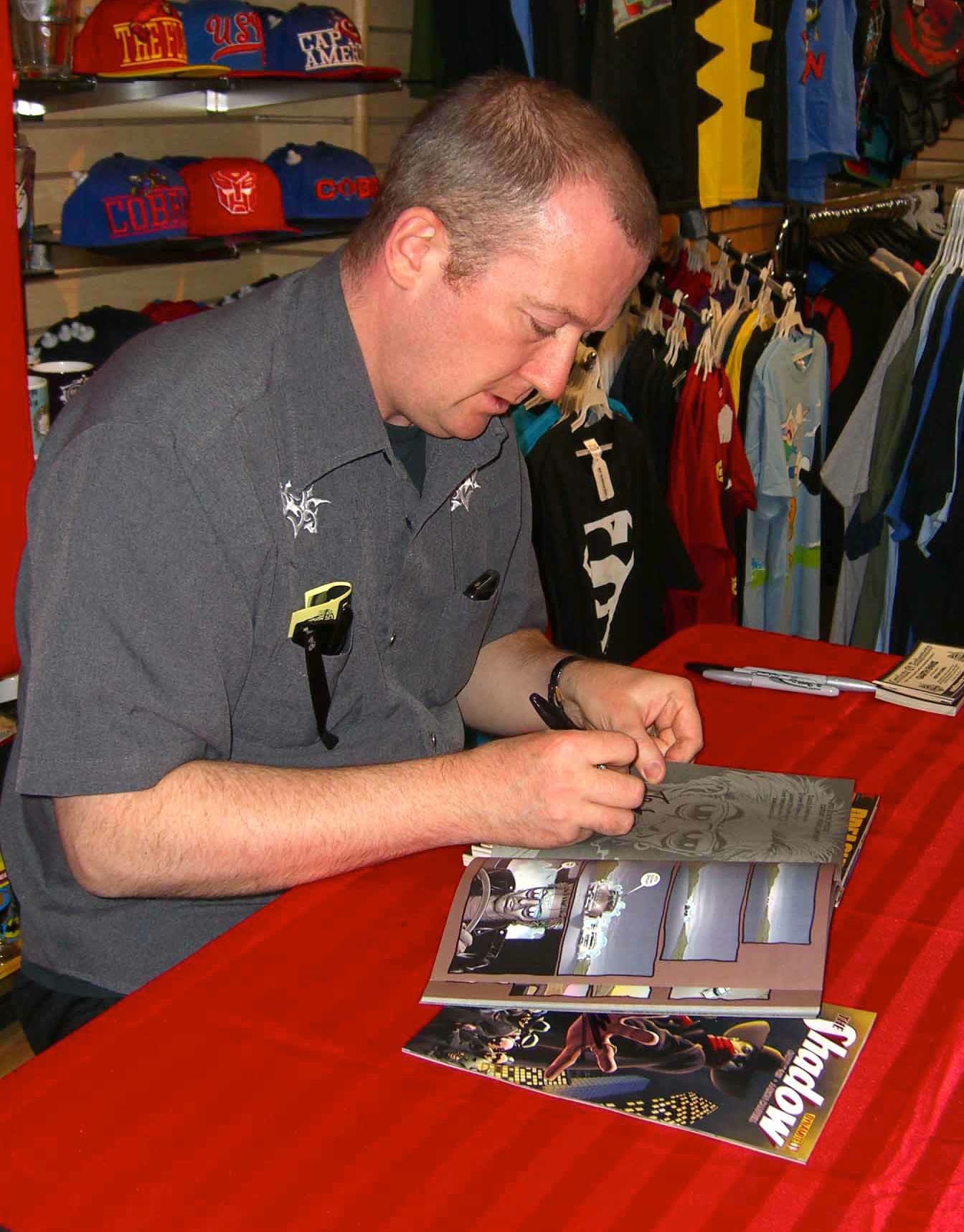
Preacher co-creator Garth Ennis reviews every script of the series, responding to Sam Catlin's team of writers.

"The Possibilities" was written by Chris Kelley. elements in the episode are based on the first seven issues in the Preacher series, "Gone to Texas", of which the script was first read and reviewed by Preacher co-creator Garth Ennis, as with the other episodes of the series. The elements adapt, or at least provides allusions to Herr Starr from "Until the End of the World", in the form of an opening sequence, as well as from "Salvation" with Odin Quincannon.

Shortly after the airing of "The Possibilities", AMC released a featurette titled "Inside Preacher: 'The Possibilities'" which went into greater detail about Jesse's latest discovery about his powers, why Tulip is so fervent in her quest for revenge and the dangers of Donnie learning Jesse's secret. Showrunner Sam Catlin was interviewed for the segment, and stated "This episode is a lot about Jesse imagining the different possibilities of what he can do with his power. He's sort of spooked by the fact he's got this power because he doesn't trust himself with it. Jesse needs to tell somebody." Catlin then acknowledges that both Custer and Cassidy "take his power for a ride". Speaking about the revelation of Carlos' location, Catlin noted about Brienne and Jaime's reunion that "I think he agrees to go with Tulip and kill Carlos for two reasons: Carlos is on Jesse's radar, and they've been looking for him for years [...] Tulip's found him. Also Jesse's in a place where he doesn't trust himself to be a preacher and to be a good guy with his power [...]. Catlin continued by mentioning Donnie's staged ambush in the gas station bathroom, where Jesse comes to learn the terrifying extent of his powers, "The bathroom scene is a test ... because Jesse has the perfect excuse and alibi to use the power for violence." He continued mentioning it to be an integral scene, "The fact that he's so directly tested in that moment and he passes that test gives him new confidence and he realises, "Now I know what I want to use it for" [...] He can actually be a good preacher."

Tom Brooke, who portrays Fiore, spoke of the story progression as being the thing which excites him the most, with Brooke stating, "[...] If you imagine where you think it's going to go, I guarantee you that it will go somewhere completely different. I've seen a lot of elements in this show that other shows have, but they're not used in the way that we use them. Nobody's got a vampire like our vampire." Joseph Gilgun, who portrays Cassidy, spoke about his character's encounter with Jesse in "The Possibilities", "Cassidy's someone you can go to. He's not gonna judge you 'cos he's nuts, who is he to judge? I think Cassidy sees Jesse's power as being an opportunity."

Dominic Cooper, who portrays Jesse Custer, spoke with AMC about the progression of Custer in this particular episode, to which he states, "He feels a responsibility towards everyone, and each and every time he's confronted by such desperation." Cooper furthers this point by suggesting: "Jesse's been convinced by Tulip to go back on the road and find this man, who he feels is responsible for the breakup of their relationship, and the death of the security guard." to which he then adds, "It reaches a point with Jessie where the balance is tipped and you can see the furiousness of his past come out." Cooper concludes by making mention of Custer's scene with Donnie, wherein Cooper remarks, "When you are looking for signs you find signs, it's a sign. Then Donnie approaches Jesse in the toilet cubicle prepare to blow Jesse's brains out, and he remembers again his reason for being in the town and what he's promise his father and what he must accomplish."

Ruth Negga, who plays Tulip O'Hare, spoke of O'Hare involvement with Custer in "The Possibilities", with Negga stating, "Someone hurt them very badly. Her way of making peace with that is getting revenge. It's like she needs [Jesse] to bare witness to it with her. Tulip represents the past, and the past for him is full of regret. All he can hear is his father." Derek Wilson spoke of his character Donnie Schenck and what the events set in "The Possibilities" may set in stone, with Wilson remarking of Custer, "I think in that moment he realises that this power could be use for something much grander. It's unbelievable." Wilson begins to speak of Donnie's discovery, "Donnie's whimpering on a toilet with a gun to his mouth. He's beaten. He doesn't need to die. The thing that that sets up is how Donnie, a very dangerous person, and unhinged person, knows about this power."

=== Casting ===
The episode saw the return of special guest star Jackie Earle Haley reprising his role as the villainous Odin Quincannon. Actor Graham McTavish's name is featured in the newly constructed opening title sequence, though he does not appear.

Actress Bonita Friedericy, known for her role as Diane Beckman in Chuck, reprises her role as Terri Loach, with Gianna LePera playing daughter Tracy Loach, respectively. "The Possibilities" shows the reintroduction of Ptolemy Slocum appearing as Linus, a sick man with an unhealthy interest in a little girl he sees every day in his school bus. The episode also marks the first appearance of guest star Julie Dretzin, the wife of Preacher showrunner Sam Catlin, as the mysterious Dany.

=== Filming ===
"The Possibilities" was directed by Scott Winant, a first time director for Preacher. The episode title is an allusion to the scene where Cassidy convinces Jesse about imagining the different possibilities of what he can do with his power. Prior to the airing of "The Possibilities", upcoming director and Preacher co-executive producer, Michael Slovis spoke of Winant turning to him and saying, "I've done a lot of fantasy or comic book-based episodic shows in my life, and none have been as deeply layered as this. It's extraordinary."

Winant spoke about filming certain scenes of the episode, the segment where Cassidy takes out DeBlanc and Fiore once more with the help of the All Saints van, in the behind the scenes featurette published by AMC after the airing of the episode. Winant mentions the relationship between the practical aspects of filming such a scene, with that of the visual effects, to which he states, "The visual effects people will have to combine the real actors with the fake dummies. The dummies become real as soon as they're under the van tumbling around. I will set up my cameras with the actors, then I will remove them from those same setups and have the van run through."

Prosthetic designer Howard Berger was interviewed for the "Making Of Preacher: The Possibilities" segment and spoke of the creation of the van sequence, which primarily involved practical prosthetics, though also incorporated some VFX. Berger went on to describe more specifically the usage of such practical prosthetics, "These green screen gloves and leggings we'll put that on [Brooke and Yusef] and we'll get them dressed and we've got these body parts and we're going to attach them with Velcro underneath their costumes [...] For Fiore, who's gonna have a compound fracture, [we'll] green screen his leg [...]." Berger continued by detailing the process at which the prosthetics are used, to which he stated, "They're just slip latex skins backed with polyfoam, it's like a two part a and b that you mix together and it foams up."Berger also mentioned, "Soft polyfoam that's been tinted red and their armature wire running through it so we can position it". Make-up artist Mike Smithson of KNB EFX was also interviewed for the "Making Of Preacher: "The Possibilities"" segment, with him noting, "Most of these body parts will be under clothing, but the carnage and trauma we're going to end up dressing." For the intricate scene of Cassidy running DeBlanc and Fiore over with the church van, 12 costumes, two dummies, three stunt doubles, and a great deal of prosthetics were involved.

Costume designer Karyn Wagner spoke of her role within "The Possibilities", more so her involvement in the van sequence with Cassidy, Fiore and DeBlanc, wherein Wagner stated, "For a stunt like this, you have to consider what you can get 8 to 12 of, because you need multiple takes for principal actors. You also have stunt men who you have standing in for them, sets get dirty or destroyed; in this particular case you have dummies who also need clothes."

Negga, in an interview with The Wall Street Journal, insisted that she wanted to put in that would reveal Tulip's quick-thinking on her feet within the scene between Tulip and the state trooper, as she stated, "She's really good at this. They added in that bit about how she has this technique. They're quite frightening, state troopers. I don't think you can easily talk your way out of anything with them. She has this trick where she has a veteran's ring ... which is actually a really terrible thing to do. She has the notion that, if it will help her out, she will go to extremes. At the same time, you don't feel judgment for her, and she doesn't do it out of any disrespect." Negga concluded that, "[...] I think that she's really good at getting herself out of sticky situations, mainly because she's really good at getting herself into sticky situations. There's something about her. Even though she's quite irreverent and loud, you can't help but have affection for her.

=== Cinematography ===
"The Possibilities" was shot with a Sony F55 in 4K raw in a distributed aspect ratio of 16:9 by John Grillo. For lenses, Grillo uses Panavision PVintage primes, which are rehoused Ultra Speeds from the 1970s. He also uses Angenieux Optimo lenses, including the 15-40, 28-76, 45-120 and 24-290mm. He used a Tiffen Black Pro-Mist 1/8 filter in front of the lens, as it "helps take some of the edge off the sharpness of the sensor. We have some characters who wear prosthetics, so it definitely helps."

=== Visual effects ===
Kevin Lingenfelser was the overall Visual Effects Supervisor and visual effects company FuseFX worked on most of the visual effects for "The Possibilities".

=== Marketing ===
Prior to Preacher's public release, AMC provided the first four episodes of the season 1 for review, only available to critics, which included "Pilot", "See", "The Possibilities" and "Monster Swamp". After two weeks of only title cards, "The Possibilities" features Preacher's full-length opening credits sequence, featuring Western-influenced music from composer Dave Porter as well as a collection of images from the first few episodes.

On June 12, 2016, AMC released a sneak peek for the upcoming episode "The Possibilities", containing a segment of the opening scene with Tulip and Dany. Shortly after the airing of the episode, on June 13, AMC released a selection of extras for "The Possibilities", including photos, an interview with actor Tom Brooke, interviews with the crew as well as a making of behind the scenes. On June 13, 2016, AMC promoted the following of the Preacher magazine on Flipboard, where the latest in full episodes, sneak peeks, behind the scenes moments, exclusive cast interviews can be accessed through a mobile device.

On June 14, 2016, Madman Mike Allred brought his retro-pop style to the latest custom Preacher comic cover. The cover features the trio of Jesse, Cassidy and Tulip slyly celebrating having cut themselves free from the hands that have been pulling their strings, with covers by such artists as Preacher co-creator Steve Dillon and Preacher cover artist Glenn Fabry being available when singing up to the Preacher Insiders Club. On June 17, 2016, shortly before the release of the upcoming Preacher episode, Monster Swamp, artist Dustin Nguyen created the latest custom Preacher comic cover featuring Cassidy after having recently fed on something.

On June 13, 2016, Preacher's "The Possibilities" became available to stream or purchase on AMC.com's website, iTunes, Amazon, Google Play, Xbox Video and more.

== Reception ==
=== Ratings ===
"The Possibilities" was viewed by 1.75 million American households on its initial viewing, which was slightly less than the previous week's rating of 2.08 million viewers for the episode "See". "The Possibilities" also acquired a 0.7 rating in the 18–49 demographic, making it the eighteenth highest rated show on cable television of the night. With Live+3 ratings the episode was watched by 3.16 millions people.

=== Critical reception ===
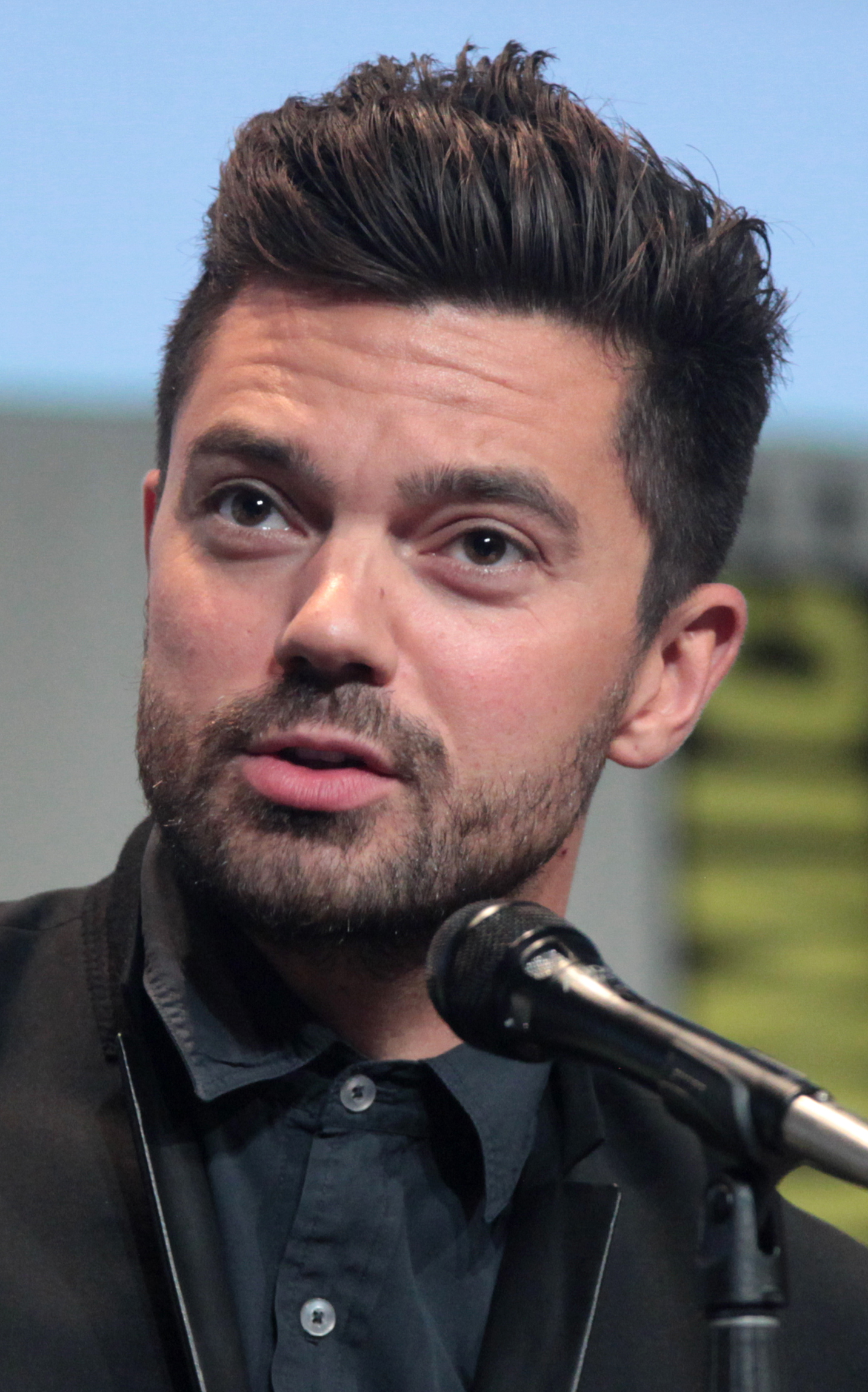
Critics praised Cooper's interactions with co-star Derek Wilson.

"The Possibilities" was received mostly positively by critics, who listed Gilgun's performance, Jesse's interaction with Donnie, Cassidy learning the truth about Fiore and DeBlanc, and Tulip's performance with the cop as being the high points of the episode. Review aggregator Rotten Tomatoes gave the episode a 94% rating, based on 17 reviews with an average score of 6.9/10, with the site's consensus stating, "A slowdown after the raucous first two episodes, "The Possibilities" takes the time to address the plot and get us better acquainted with Jesse and Tulip's checkered past."

Eric Goldman of IGN reacted positively to "The Possibilities", remarking that: "The third episode of Preacher gave us some answers on Fiore and DeBlanc, while also filling in more info on Jesse and Tulip's past. Meanwhile, Odin remains a very odd, ominous periphery figure. It remains to be seen what his "deal" fully is, but seeing him sitting there listening to the sounds of cattle was suitably creepy." Zack Handlen of The A.V. Club gave the episode a 'B+' grade, and described "The Possibilities" as, "[...] isn't a huge nose-dive in quality. The tone is more or less intact, the acting's still good, and some individual scenes work quite nicely on their own. But what seemed novel and maybe even innovative in those first two episodes is starting to look more and more like a creative team that has no idea how to tell a story."

Reflecting on "The Possibilities", JoBlo's Paul Shirey wrote the episode, "[...] [introduces] us to some new conflicts to the story, as well as a well-known threat from the comics that will be pure gold to see play out, depending on how far we get in the series". Shirey too noted that, "Cooper's intensity builds with each new episode and Negga has captured a great version of Tulip. Cassidy is by far my favorite supporting character [...]". Eric Thurm of The Guardian spoke highly, to which he stated, "Finally, we get a glimpse of what Tulip and Jesse did in their past life - and it's not pretty." In a B− grade review, Indiewire writer Jeff Stone summarized, "After two weeks of insanity, Episode 3, "The Possibilities," offers a lot of teases and not much else."

James White of Empire spoke most highly of Gilgun's performance, with him writing: "Yet more chances for [Gilgun] to be funny, playing up Cassidy's laziness and light fingers. He can also effortlessly play the quieter moments, such as the chat with Jesse when he finds the Preacher prone after his discovery of his new power." White also praised Donnie Vs. Jesse as the episodic highlight.

Alan Sepinwall of HitFix praised the episode to which he remarked, ""The Possibilities" is the first episode with a different director Scott Winant and writer Chris Kelley. It's also by far the clearest and most straightforward installment so far, for good and for ill [...] but on the whole, it's a more measured, at times bordering on slow, hour, focusing on the central character at his most dour." Mark Rozeman, for Paste, wrote, ""The Possibilities" is a much quieter, more straightforward affair. And while that's to be expected, the episode sometimes feels a bit more like a bit of connective tissue than a solid episode unto itself." Rozeman spoke highly of the climactic confrontation between Jesse and Donnie, and Ruth Negga's performance.

Jonathan Hatfull of SciFiNow wrote, "There's good stuff here and some necessary breath taking, but it does feel like there's just a little bit of wheel spinning alongside catching up." Hatfull note that both Tom Brooke and Anatol Yusef "steal the show this week". Kimber Myers of The Playlist praised "The Possibilities", commenting that it [Shades] in the outlines the first two hours have given us and [adds] more dimension." Ron Hogan of Den Of Geek scored the episode four out of five stars, writing, "Whether she's cleverly talking her way out of a speeding ticket or browbeating the driver of a beat-up hatchback, Ruth Negga absolutely shines in "The Possibilities."

Cory Barker of TV Guide suggested that: "The Possibilities did the work needed to move Preacher forward. Some of the early outstanding questions were addressed with varying levels of clarity." Barker also remarked highly of Gilgun's acting by stating, "[Gilgun] has been the show's standout performer through three episodes, but Cassidy's incredulous response to the deadpan, matter-of-fact ways of Fiore and DeBlanc may be my favorite moment of Preacher thus far".
