= Pilot (Preacher) =

- Preacher episode
- Jesse Custer encounters Genesis at All Saints Congregational.
- Episode no.: Season 1 Episode 1
- Directed by: Seth Rogen; Evan Goldberg
- Story by: Seth Rogen; Evan Goldberg; Sam Catlin
- Teleplay by: Sam Catlin
- Cinematography by: Bill Pope
- Editing by: Kelley Dixon
- Original air date: May 22, 2016
- Running time: 64 minutes

Guest appearances
- Derek Wilson as Donnie Schenck; Ricky Mabe as Miles Person; Jamie Anne Allman as Betsy Schenck; Brian Huskey as Ted Reyerson

Episode chronology
← Previous —	Next → "See"

"Pilot" is the series premiere of the supernatural drama television series Preacher, which originally aired on AMC in the United States on May 22, 2016. The episode was written by the creators of the television adaptation, Seth Rogen, Evan Goldberg and Sam Catlin; with both Rogen and Goldberg directing. The pilot encore was followed by Talking Preacher, AMC's after-show hosted by Chris Hardwick.

The episode introduces Dominic Cooper as Jesse Custer, Joseph Gilgun as Cassidy, and Ruth Negga as Tulip O'Hare, as well as series regulars played by Lucy Griffiths, W. Earl Brown, Tom Brooke, Anatol Yusef and Ian Colletti. In Preacher's pilot, Jesse Custer's past slowly catches up to him and he struggles to escape it, while a mysterious entity arrives on Earth, causing a wave of destruction in its path.

Principal photography for the pilot began on May 13, 2015, in Albuquerque, New Mexico. Filming took place over two months, ending in early July. Principal photography was confirmed to have ended on July 10, 2015, with post-production beginning in August 2015.

The pilot received acclaim from critics, who found the pilot to be a respectful interpretation of the comic, for Rogen and Goldberg's direction, as well as the dark humorous tonality, while praising Cooper, Gilgun and Negga's performances. In the United States, the series premiere achieved a viewership of 3.8 million, making it one of the top three cable premieres in the 2016 television season. The episode garnered a Nielsen rating of 0.9 in the 18–49 demographic, translating to 2.4 million viewers.

== Plot ==
In outer space, a bright object crosses the galaxy and finds its way to Earth, specifically Nairobi, Kenya, where it strikes a preacher, Irungu Mutu, and inhabits him. He explodes shortly thereafter, causing his congregants to flee.

In Annville, Texas, the local preacher Jesse Custer (Dominic Cooper) gets dressed and leaves for church. Jesse walks to All Saints Congregational and delivers an uninspired sermon to a bored and distracted congregation. At the Sunday barbecue outside the church, a young boy named Chris (Thomas Barbusca) tells Jesse that his father, Donnie (Derek Wilson), abuses his mother. He asks Jesse to hurt his father, though Jesse warns him that violence simply leads to more violence. Sheriff Hugo Root (W. Earl Brown) asks Jesse to check in on his son Eugene. Jesse tells Sheriff Root that Donnie is beating his wife, Betsy, but Sheriff Root refuses to investigate unless Betsy files a formal complaint.

In a corporate jet, a group of hedge funders drink with an Irishman named Cassidy (Joseph Gilgun), who tells tales of his last trip to Tijuana. After discovering in the bathroom a Bible whose pages are covered in thick notes scrawled all over them, Cassidy notes that the plane is not flying toward Tijuana. He then kills the hedge funders and pilots, who turn out to be assassins. Cassidy reveals himself a vampire by drinking the pilot's blood and jumping out of the soon-to-crash plane with a to-go bottle of blood and umbrella in hand.

At a diner, a church attendee by the name of Ted (Brian Huskey) gripes about his mother to Jesse. Emily (Lucy Griffiths), who works at the diner, suggests Jesse check on her co-worker, Walter, who called in sick. Back in Nairobi, two mysterious men step out of a jeep and enter the church. Jesse stops by Walter's house, finding Walter passed out drunk and hearing a woman singing in the shower, he immediately leaves.

In Kansas, a woman named Tulip O'Hare (Ruth Negga) races down the road while fighting a gangster. Their fight continues in the back seat as the car snakes its way through a corn field; careening to a stop outside a farmhouse, Tulip kills the gangster and grabs a map from his jacket. She receives a text alerting her that more people are coming for her and enlists a boy and girl from the farmhouse to help make a bazooka out of metal cans and army men. Tulip hides the kids in a cellar and they hear mayhem and destruction above ground. They emerge to find a helicopter crashed in their yard with army men impaled in the dead pilot's head.

Cassidy, whose guts lie around him in a crater in a nearby cornfield, lures a cow in and devours it. At Quincannon Meat & Power, Betsy admits to Jesse that Donnie beats her, but insists that she enjoys the abuse as part of their sex life. Meanwhile, in Russia, police investigate a church that has been struck by the “comet.” A witness tells police that the Magister exploded in the middle of mass. The two mysterious men who were investigating in Kenya enter the church and shut the doors.

Jesse stops by the Root house and meets Eugene (Ian Colletti), whose face is grotesquely disfigured. Eugene worries that God doesn't want him at church because of what he did and wonders if some deeds are too evil to be forgiven, to which Jesse assures Eugene that God forgives him. Afterwards, Jesse drinks at a local bar, where he meets Cassidy. Donnie strides into the bar with his friends and punches Jesse for talking to Betsy. Donnie threatens to beat Chris for speaking to Jesse, for which Jesse takes down Donnie and his friends. Sheriff Root tells Jesse to stop, but Jesse assures him, "almost done Sheriff", and concludes by breaking Donnie's arm. Jesse sits in a jail cell with Cassidy, who Sheriff Root believed to be Jesse's accomplice. Jesse's released on bail and the two men shake hands before parting ways.

Emily picks up Jesse from jail and drives him to the church, where Jesse informs her that he's quitting and will make an announcement on Sunday. Inside the church, Jesse sits on a pew, where he decides to ask for God's help one last time. Getting no response, he lights up a cigarette. The doors creak open and the pews move. A supernatural shadow, which reveals itself to be the "comet", approaches Jesse and slams him to the ground.

Jesse wakes up three days later on Sunday morning, with Emily informing him that Cassidy found Jesse passed out at the church and has since moved into the attic, carrying out basic maintenance on the church itself. As Jesse walks to church, Ted harangues him about his mother again. Jesse tells Ted in a stern, otherworldly voice, "Be brave, tell her the truth, open your heart." Ted rushes off, repeating Jesse's words like a mantra. Tulip enters All Saints, where Cassidy, too, is attending Jesse's sermon. Jesse, who initially set out to quit, instead tells his congregation that he's going to make things right. Meanwhile, Ted goes to his mother's retirement home, asking her to treat him with kindness. He unbuttons his shirt and takes out a knife. "Now I have to open my heart to you," he says. He cuts his chest open, removes his heart and falls dead on the table as his mother screams.

One of the mystery men (Tom Brooke) from Russia and Kenya eats a tea bag while waiting in his car. "It's here," his partner (Anatol Yusef) informs him. They cross the street and stand at the foot of the driveway to All Saints Congregational.

== Production ==
=== Conception ===
"We started reading the comic when it first came out in the '90s. In many ways Garth’s sense of drama and comedy and Steve Dillon’s visual aesthetic helped form our style, and the idea that we are actually bringing Preacher to life is a dream come true. This is the craziest thing ever and we can’t wait to move forward and work our asses off to make it the best it can be."

— Seth Rogen and Evan Goldberg, on the experience of Preacher

Seth Rogen and Evan Goldberg discovered Preacher in Point Grey Secondary School, with Rogen recalling that "Evan's brother had read Preacher, and then Evan gave it to me to read [...]." He insisted that the book had "everything", noting that "It was funny, it was dramatic, it had a lot of action and violence, it was horrific at times, perverted at times, very real at times." Rogen would hang out in comic book stores in L.A. recommending the title to people who came in, and once Superbad (2007) was released, Preacher became their dream project. Rogen stated, "Ever since we had any clout in any way, shape, or form—not that we ever had that much ever, because it took a fucking decade, basically—but we tried to get it turned into something," while adding that they, [...] wanted to be the ones who translated it in some way."

Preacher institutes elements, from Rogen's perspective, from Ingmar Bergman's The Devil's Eye (1960), Douglas Adams' The Hitchhiker's Guide to the Galaxy (1981), Quentin Tarantino's Pulp Fiction (1994), and Joel and Ethan Coen's No Country for Old Men (2007), as well as the films of Sam Raimi and Peter Jackson. While developing The Green Hornet (2011), they were introduced to producer Neal Moritz, with whom Rogen and Goldberg built a close relationship with. Eventually Mortiz started controlling the property, though it eventually fell into the laps of Rogen and Goldberg due to the unsuccessful attempts at an adaption on Moritz's part. Goldberg admitted that the initial plan was for a Band of Brothers (2001)-esque 10-part miniseries, though the state of cable television at that time meant they had to abandon that idea.

They claimed that they had considered the idea of a movie, but never actively pursued it beyond once such occasion, as after selling the screenplay for Superbad (2007), Rogen and Goldberg tried unsuccessfully to pitch studios a Preacher adaptation. During the release of Pineapple Express (2008), Rogen commented, "I remember we had a meeting with whoever controlled the property at the time. We showed them the fight from Pineapple Express, to show them that we can execute action and comedy in some capacity." In terms of the preferred platform of adaption, Rogen acknowledged, "We would have taken it in any form we could get", while the overriding thought between him and Goldberg was that they didn't wish for anyone else adapting Preacher".

In October 2013, Rogen and Goldberg asked Breaking Bad writer and producer Sam Catlin to work with them as showrunner on a potential televised adaptation of Preacher, before giving him a copy of the source material. By Rogen's account, both Goldberg and himself "[...] pitched the comic. We didn't even talk about what we were going to do. We just pitched the comic, panel-for-panel of what happens in the comic" to Catlin in the lobby of the television network. Catlin described it as, "[...] incredible, amazing, over-the-top, profane, irreverent [...]", though he was unsure as to how a potential television show could occur given its content. He also acknowledged the importance of Breaking Bad in the development of Preacher, by suggesting "[...] I don't think people would have been willing to take a chance on Preacher if there had not been a Breaking Bad. It was one of those groundbreaking shows that paved the way for what is possible on TV."

On November 16, 2013, it was announced that AMC was developing a TV series based on the DC Vertigo comic book series Preacher. On November 18, 2013, it was revealed that Seth Rogen and Evan Goldberg were developing the series pilot with Sam Catlin, and that it would be distributed by Sony Pictures Television. On February 6, 2014, AMC ordered a pilot script to be written by Rogen and Goldberg, and confirmed Catlin would serve as showrunner. On December 3, 2014, AMC ordered the pilot of Preacher, directed by Rogen and Goldberg and written by Catlin, to be filmed.

On September 9, 2015, AMC ordered 10 one-hour episodes, with an expected premiere date in mid-2016. Joel Stillerman, president of original programming and development for AMC and SundanceTV, stated, "[Ennis]' Preacher is, above all, about great characters – something we look for in all of our series. The fact that it is also darkly funny, has some great supernatural elements, and takes us on an incredible adventure is just the icing on the cake", while adding, "The incredible creative team behind this show [...] made a pilot that completely blew us away, and we know the series will satisfy and surprise fans of the comics, and captivate fans of great TV everywhere".

=== Writing ===
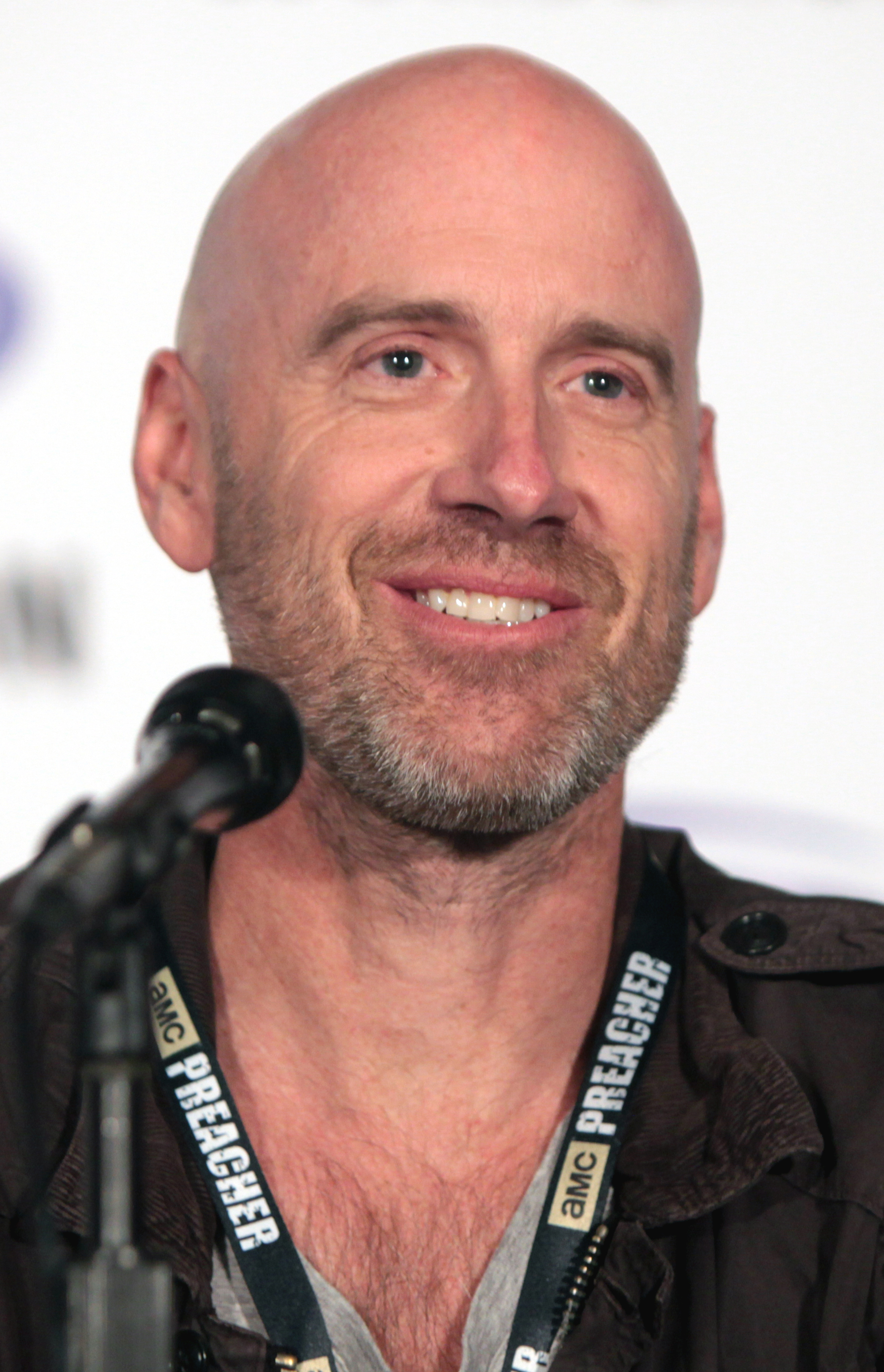
Writer Sam Catlin wrote the teleplay of the pilot, and co-wrote the story with Rogen and Goldberg.

"Pilot" was written by the series' creators Seth Rogen, Evan Goldberg and Sam Catlin. Some elements in the episode are based on the first seven issues in the Preacher series, Gone to Texas, of which the script was first read and reviewed by Preacher co-creator Garth Ennis, as with the other episodes of the series. It also adapts, or at least provides allusions to Jesse's father John Custer from Until the End of the World, in the form of various black and white flashback sequences.

Goldberg described the process of translating the main characters' emotional stories from the comic to television as the biggest challenge. "We had to make sure that you understood who each person was and what kind of person they were early on", he stated, while noting the difficulties with Eugene's prosthetics, so as not to stifle the actor and to allow him to stay true to the character. Though the translating difficulties were lessened somewhat by what Goldberg mentioned as the "ultimate ace card" in the form of Garth Ennis, who would review every single script and respond accordingly, as such, "When [Ennis] gets a script, he'll respond in, like, four hours with notes. When he thinks we're wrong, he tells us—and it hasn't been much, but he lets it be known, and it's very helpful", said Goldberg.

In an interview with IGN, Sam Catlin described some of the thought process he had when writing the introduction of Jesse in the pilot and states the television series will not immediately reflect the story as told in the comics, saying, "In some ways in terms of Jesse's journey most of all, it's a prequel in how we think of it. We really wanted to spend time with Jesse as a preacher. He's a preacher in name only in the comic book. We never actually see him preach, and so we really liked this idea of having him believe in God and trust God and have an investment in God and see that, and then what happens when the rug is sort of pulled out from under him."

Catlin, conducted an interview with The Verge prior to the airing of the episode, and spoke about writing process on Preacher, and how he's running his writers' room, stating, "It's me and six other writers, and we operate it basically the way Vince ran Breaking Bad. Which is we try to break the stories pretty tightly in the room, so then a writer goes and writes their episode, but everyone's on the same page." Catlin continued, "So that's the structure, and then a writer of an episode goes to be on set, and they sort of produce their episode, and they're the voice of the writers for that particular episode. So I'm trying to steal as much as possible from Breaking Bad."

Dominic Cooper, who portrays Jesse Custer, spoke with AMC about his feelings of the script, saying that the pilot script "was one of the scripts that was being talked about a lot during pilot season, and I managed to get a hold of one at a friend's house. I just wanted something to do with it. I thought it was really the best thing I'd read in a long time. I still didn't have a huge knowledge of the comics. [...] after experiencing [Rogen and Goldberg's] enthusiasm and having seen the first script, I read all of the volumes of the comics back-to-back very quickly."

=== Casting ===
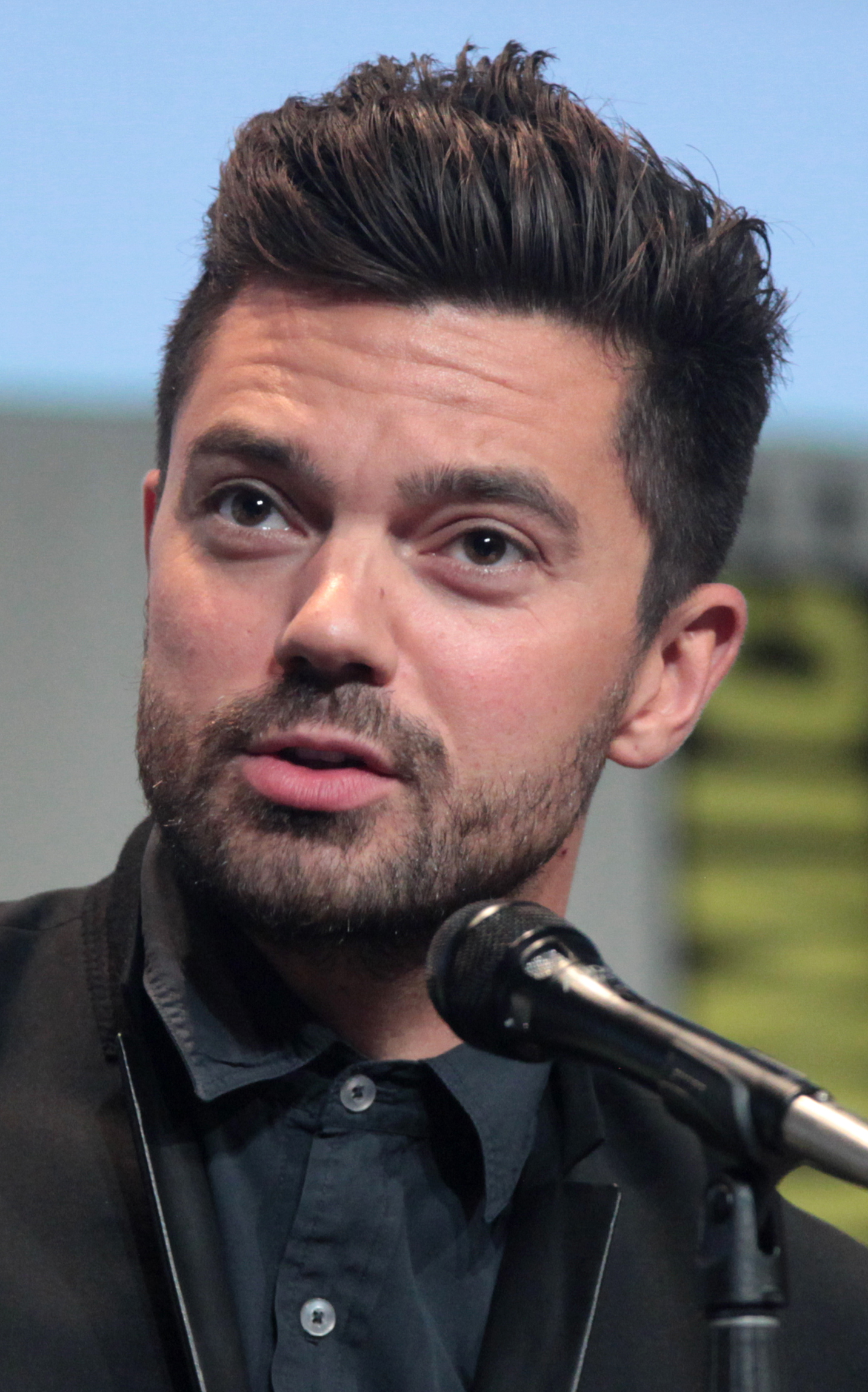
From top to bottom: Dominic Cooper and Joseph Gilgun

On March 18, 2015, Ruth Negga had been cast as the female lead, Tulip O'Hare. On the casting of Negga, Catlin stated, "It felt like there was a lot of story there to tell. But it wasn't a mandate. If we had found a white actor we liked better we would have cast her. It was just a bonus that the best person for the job happened to be Irish-Ethiopian." Negga acknowledged the departure from the Tulip of the comic books, saying, "But it's purely physical. I don't think the spirit of her has changed at all — I wouldn't want it to." She also commented, "When I read the script, I thought 'please let me play this character,' 'cause it's usually the boys who get to do that — people think girls aren't capable of extreme violence", while describing Tulip by expressing that "She unfurls more and more in such an unexpected, exciting way ... I think remorse is something she quells. She does have an extreme sense that justice should be served, but it's her justice".

On March 24, 2015, Joseph Gilgun was confirmed to be joining the cast of Preacher as Cassidy. Catlin had found Gilgun, to which Goldberg said, "The first audition Sam saw was Joe and he kept saying, 'You guys have got to see this guy. It's a weird tape that he filmed in his mother's basement", to which he added, "It was one of those weird things where we just didn't watch it for weeks. We met with 100 other people." However, after watching the audition tape, Rogen and Goldberg were impressed. Both men first met Gilgun during a Skype call with Rogen noting, "[...] it was like talking to Cassidy. He was the guy. There was no one who was even close to a second choice for that role. If we hadn't gotten him, I don't know what the f— we would've done." Gilgun spoke of his portrayal of Cassidy, remarking that "They let me by myself", while furthering that sentiment by stating, "They let me run riot and be a total a–hole and do my job [...] There's not the right words in the right order to describe it. 'Thanks' just feels a bit empty. And they pay me! They pay me to be a complete wanker every single day! And I've been doing that for years without making a f—ing penny."

On April 9, 2015, Lucy Griffiths was confirmed to be joining the cast as Emily Woodrow. According to The Hollywood Reporter, "Emily's a waitress, the church organist, a bookkeeper and Jesse's loyal right hand. Stoic and strong, wise beyond her years, she can't help but have a little thing for Preacher Jesse".

On April 17, 2015, it was announced that Dominic Cooper was confirmed as the show's male lead, Jesse Custer, with Rogen writing, "We have Jesse Custer! [Cooper] is gonna save our souls." Rogen had been impressed by Cooper's dual performances in The Devil's Double (2011) and invited him to meet with the producing team. Cooper was intrigued by the script for the pilot, with Cooper thinking Rogen, Goldberg, and Catlin might "have all gone mad," but the actor was also fascinated by their pitch, as "It sounded like nothing I'd ever heard of". Cooper spoke of finding the script at one of his friend's houses, and commented on "[...] really, really [liking] it. I thought it was unlike anything I'd read before and was so amazed by the depth of it — and the landscapes and the characterizations — that I wanted to know more about it".

On April 21, 2015, W. Earl Brown confirmed to be portraying Hugo Root, "a slovenly, Western-influenced character with a skewed moral compass." On May 5, 2015, Jamie Anne Allman and Derek Wilson were later confirmed to be a part of the pilot's supporting cast, with Allman as Betsy Schenck, "a meek wife who suffers beatings by the hand of her husband"; and Wilson playing a "Civil War re-enactor and abusive thug who gets into altercations with [Custer] but nevertheless shows up to church on Sunday". On May 19, 2015, Ian Colletti was confirmed to have joined the cast of Preacher, playing Eugene Root / "Arseface", "[...] the nicest kid you'll ever meet and really looks up to Jesse. Stomach-churningly difficult to look at, Eugene's the town's reviled Frankenstein's monster, but that won't change his earnest, sweet and pure outlook on life. However, he is troubled by something terrible he's done in the past — something he fears might have turned God himself against him". On May 19, 2015, Tom Brooke was confirmed to be portraying Fiore.

Writer Sam Catlin has a voice cameo in the pilot. Midway through the pilot, there is a news report that shows Tom Cruise speaking in front of a Church of Scientology audience, and then blowing up.

=== Filming ===
The "Pilot" of Preacher was directed by series creators Seth Rogen and Evan Goldberg, both first-time television directors. Prior to directing for the series, Rogen and Goldberg's directorial filmography included This Is the End (2013) and The Interview (2014). Shortly after the airing of the pilot, AMC released a featurette titled "Directors' Commentary On “Pilot”" which went into greater detail about the creation of the pilot episode, with both Rogen and Goldberg providing commentary and insight into its construction. The directors were intent on challenging themselves within the production, with the budget limitations helping in that regard, as it forced both men to become even more creative, to which Rogen remarked, "We were very concerned about our budget on this show, and how good our visual effects would be. We said, 'Let's not even try to make it look like good visual effects; let's make it look like visual effects from 1967,' so this is what we came up with." Rogen and Goldberg wanted each character from the series and their storylines to have "[...] its own look, own lighting style, and own camera style".

Principal photography was confirmed to have begun in the city on May 13, 2015, after AMC had officially ordered the production of ten episodes for the series, with an expected 2016 release and an original shooting schedule. Filming for Preacher took place over two months, ending in early July. Principal photography was confirmed to have ended on July 10, 2015, with post-production beginning in August 2015. The pilot was shot completely in anamorphic format on 16 mm film, using cameras provided by Keslow Camera, which included Sony CineAlta F55 with Panavision PVintage lenses. Bill Pope was the director of photography, while production design was headed by Julie Berghoff. The special effects team included makeup artists Rebecca DeHerrera and Sara Roybal, special effects coordinator Stan Blackwell, and visual effects supervisor Kevin Lingenfelser.

The producers chose to film in Albuquerque, New Mexico, because of its history in the making of Breaking Bad and Better Call Saul, as well as its filming incentive program which includes a 30% tax credit for TV production and 25% for movie shoots. Catlin initially felt that Albuquerque wouldn't be the most appropriate setting to film Preacher, as he believed it would look too much like Breaking Bad or its spin-off, Better Call Saul. However, he warmed to the idea of filming in that location eventually, stating, "This is a story that begins in west Texas and I didn't want it to seem like it was the AMC backlot in New Mexico. Now I think it feels pretty distinct".

In regards to the fight scenes of the pilot, Rogen himself stated, "As fans of action movies, it was disappointing that we would watch our fight scenes and not be thrilled with them. We put a huge amount of thought and energy and time into thinking about how to stage them and choreograph them and shoot them and really try to get it to a standard that we ourselves were incredibly proud of." Speaking of the differences in directing the pilot in comparison of that of his other work, Goldberg made the point of noting that the process was extremely different. He continued: "The pace of television is way faster. The fight in the car with Tulip, for example, was filmed in eight hours. If this was a movie, that would have taken two or three days". He concluded by adding: "We have things story-boarded, we know what we're getting and we're very focused. Things move a lot faster and you get less takes".

Joseph Gilgun, who was cast to play Cassidy, spoke with The Wall Street Journal in an interview about the filming of the plane scene 30,000 feet above a small Texas town "It's his introduction, so it has to be big, it has to be fast, it has to be exciting." Gilgun spoke of preparation required to film scene, "I was so terrified [...] I knew the scene was coming up in the pilot, and that was my biggest scene of the whole stuff. As an actor, if you've got limited stuff, you can obsess over it." Gilgun went on to describe the process involved with a week's worth of rehearsal for that particular scene, "We learned the fight to a 'T,'" he said. Rogen recalled the occasion to which he thought of the idea, during a "crazy fight scene", of Cassidy falling out of a plane "[...] But I thought we needed something to match the crazy, careless vibe of this character in the middle of it — so [Goldberg] and I said, we want to actually throw a guy out of the plane. Everyone thought we were joking [...]" Rogen mentioned that it was only after bringing up the matter, three days later, questioning how such a feat was going to be achieve that "[...] people realized that yes, we're dead fucking serious here".

In an interview with Rolling Stone, Rogen described that his favorite scene in the show simply involves Cooper and Gilgun sitting in a jail cell and arguing over the nature of faith, along with the concepts good and evil, commenting, "One of my favorite things about the books were the bickering theological discussions the characters would have. We knew we could do the crazy stuff. But when I watched them film that scene, I thought, okay, this is special. This is how I felt when I first read the comics".

=== Cinematography ===
The pilot is shot with the Sony F55 in 4K raw in a distributed aspect ratio of 16:9. Preacher cinematographer John Grillo spoke of his love of the pilot, which was lensed by Bill Pope. For the pilot, Grillo liked how Pope was able to balance all the comic book elements, which include dark comedy, gore, horror and drama, while stating Pope's work on the pilot was a big influence, although Grillo wanted to bring his own ideas to the visuals in the future episodes.

=== Visual effects ===
Kevin Lingenfelser was the overall visual effects supervisor and visual effects company FuseFX worked on most of the visual effects on the pilot of Preacher.

=== Marketing ===
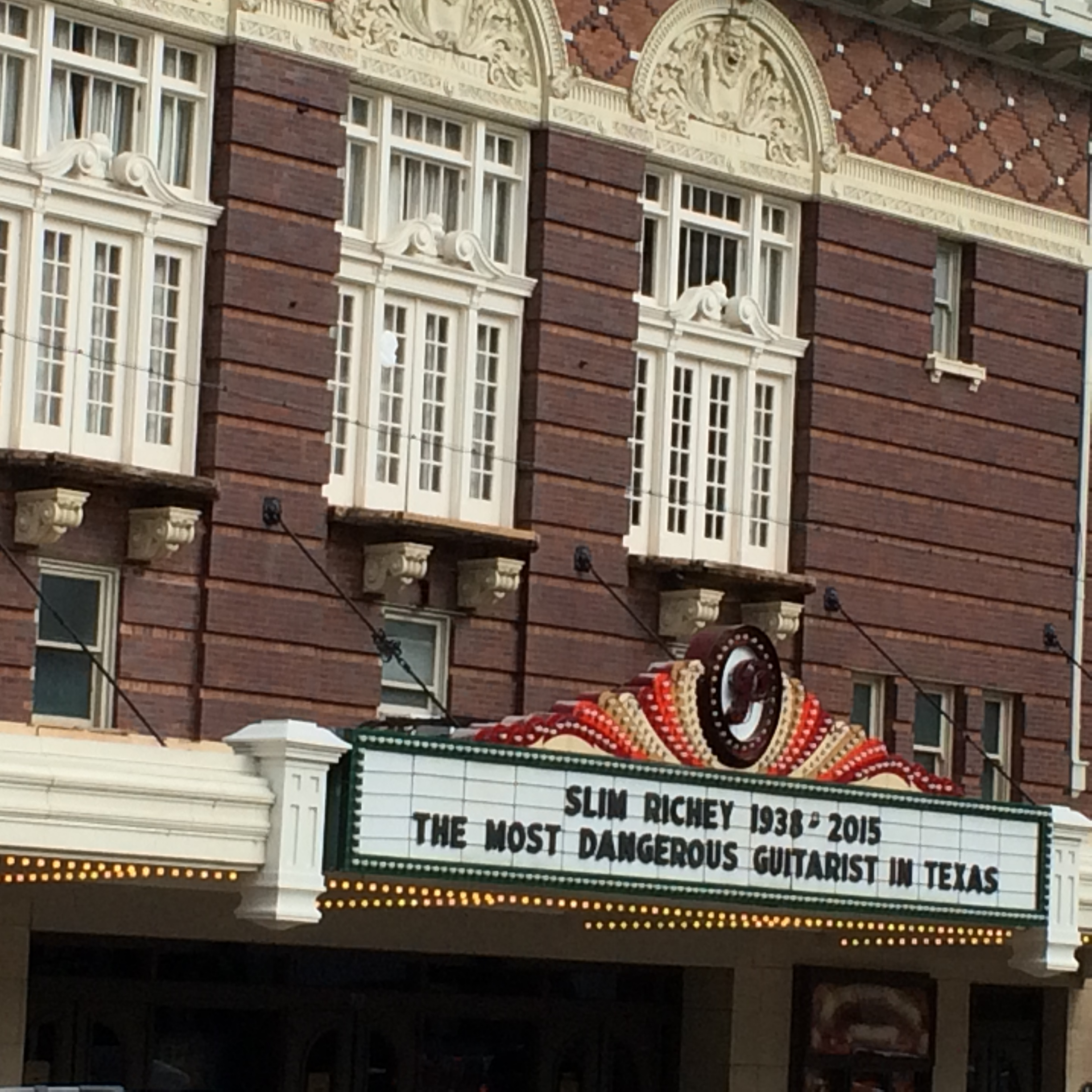
The Paramount Theatre in Austin, Texas, hosted Preacher's premiere

Prior to Preacher's public release, an advanced screening of the pilot was shown on March 14, 2016, at South by Southwest in Austin, Texas, with the episodic screening being followed by an extended 30 minute Q&A with creators and talent, where it opened to an astounding reception at The Paramount Theatre.

The official website for Preacher debuted introducing a marketing campaign and interactive 360 virtual reality tour of All Saints Congregational church to promote the pilot. AMC also provided information on the cast and crew as well as a gallery and video section. On September 9, 2015, Seth Rogen revealed that Preacher received a series order at AMC and also the first official teaser poster. On March 10, 2016, the first set images debuted on Twitter featuring Cooper as Jesse, Negga as Tulip and Gilgun as Cassidy. On March 10, 2016, AMC also released a new teaser poster and announced that the show would premiere on May 22, 2016, at 10:00 pm. The teaser trailer for Preacher debuted on October 30, 2015, with the full-length trailer released on November 1, 2015. On April 1, 2016, AMC released a new teaser trailer.

AMC debuted a sneak peek on April 11, 2016, featuring new footage of the pilot with Negga. On April 25, 2016, official images of the three central characters were released, with several new images of Sheriff Root, DeBlanc and Fiore release days later. On May 11, 2016, it was announced that AMC and DC Comics are giving away 100,000 free copies of the original Preacher #1 by Ennis and Dillon, with the issue featuring a new cover by Dillon, with the characters modeled after the lead actors Cooper, Negga and Gilgun as their respective characters. According to Entertainment Weekly, the free new edition of Preacher #1 became available May 18 in stores, and digitally on May 13.

AMC, Matt Tauber and Charitybuzz provided two people with the chance to meet the cast during a visit to the set of Preacher also to enjoy dinner with Joseph Gilgun and receive a signed poster from the cast, with a 1 night stay at Hotel Andaluz in Albuquerque, with bidding to support Citizens of the World Charter School-Silver Lake.

The pilot of Preacher, which aired from 10:00 to 11:30 p.m. on May 22, was replayed in the show's regular 9:00 p.m. timeslot the following week over the Memorial Day holiday weekend, as part of AMC's strategy designed to give viewers multiple chances to catch the series adaptation before it returns with originals on June 5. AMC is also making the premiere episode available online on AMC's free mobile app and through Apple TV. Following Preacher's premiere, Funko had unveiled its upcoming range of Pop! Television Vinyl figures which include Jesse Custer, Arseface and Cassidy, set to be released in the summer of 2016.

== Music ==
On March 8, 2016, it was announced that Dave Porter had signed on to compose original music for Preacher. Porter commented, "I can finally share this fantastic news … I'll be writing the original music for AMC's upcoming television series Preacher. Thanks to Catlin, Rogen, Goldberg, and everyone at AMC and SONY TV. I'm beyond excited for this one. Bring on the mayhem!" Porter revealed that he scored the pilot in the summer of 2015.

== Themes ==
Religion is an underlying theme in the Pilot. Custer begins to lose his faith in his church and debates leaving. He himself is lost, and God is silent to him at this moment in time, which is what he's searching for, while trying to bring a community and people together. Cooper said of the developing storyline:

I think the more I get to know about him and his background, it becomes more evident what he's in search of: He's in desperate need to find this thing, this voice that's gone missing. We discover him in such a dark, damaged place, and he's trying to desperately hold onto an idea of happiness. He's a man who remembers the place he came from and a promise which he made to his father, and he's going back to that. He's going back to do what he thinks his father would have wanted him to do, which is nurture and take care of these people who have fallen into pieces.

Rogen insisted the show is not trying to make a statement about religion. "There's some theological elements to it, but they have more to do with the characters' morality instead of whether they believe in God or not." Catlin stated that having Jesse be a man of faith at the beginning "helped us locate him in this little town. We wanted to show Jesse as something more than a preacher in name only." When asked a question on why religion isn't featured more on television, Catlin theorized, "[...] We live in a world where we're kind of surrounded by it. And we've all got an opinion, and an opinion in this world is a dreadful one. It means a huge amount to some people and not very much to others. I think people get scared that people who are religious will be offended. But the more we understand one another's beliefs, the more we can, I imagine, get on better."

== Reception ==
=== Ratings ===
The episode attained 3.8 million viewers. It garnered a 0.9 rating in the adults 18–49 demographic in "live plus same-day" estimates which translates to 2.4 million viewers, according to Nielsen ratings, with the demo score makes it the second-biggest scripted launch of 2016 on ad-supported cable, behind only FX's The People v. O.J. Simpson: American Crime Story. Uproxx's Dustin Rowles stated that Preacher "[...] had the misfortune of airing its premiere on the same night as one of the biggest Game of Thrones episodes to date, [...] the Billboard Music Awards, the NBA and NHL playoffs, and even Silicon Valley on HBO."

It obtained 2.2 million viewers from the 25–54 demographic in Live + 3 ratings. 48% of those who tuned in for the 90-minute series premiere fell into the advertiser-coveted age group. It had one of the top three cable premieres of the television season, behind Into the Badlands and The People v. O.J. Simpson: American Crime Story. Preacher's opener dropped 53% from its lead-in on Sunday night. Nielsen ratings specified highlights for Preacher as 2.0 million adults 18–49 up 74% from live or same day, 2.2 million adults 25–54 up 71% from live or same day and 3.8 million viewers, up 61% from live/same day.

Statistically, film studios were the biggest backers of the Preacher series premiere, with Paramount Pictures buying time to promote its upcoming release Star Trek Beyond, while Twentieth Century Fox hyped X-Men: Apocalypse. Sony Pictures showed support for Preacher co-creator Rogen's animated comedy Sausage Party, and Universal Pictures slotted teasers for Warcraft and The Purge: Election Year. Other backers of the Preacher pilot were Apple, Buick, Hyundai, Taco Bell, Toyota and 2K Games.

==== Reaction ====
Charlie Collier, President of AMC, SundanceTV and AMC Studios, stated, "What has been achieved in front of and behind the camera with Preacher, which arrives as one of the top cable premieres this season and looks like nothing else on television, is also astounding. We can't wait to share the rest of this remarkable season with fans everywhere. It IS the time of the preacher, and the lesson's begun." Collier in an interview with Advertising Age stated, "I think fans will watch Preacher multiple times. Just like a good film, you can watch it from different angles, and that takes time."

=== Critical reception ===
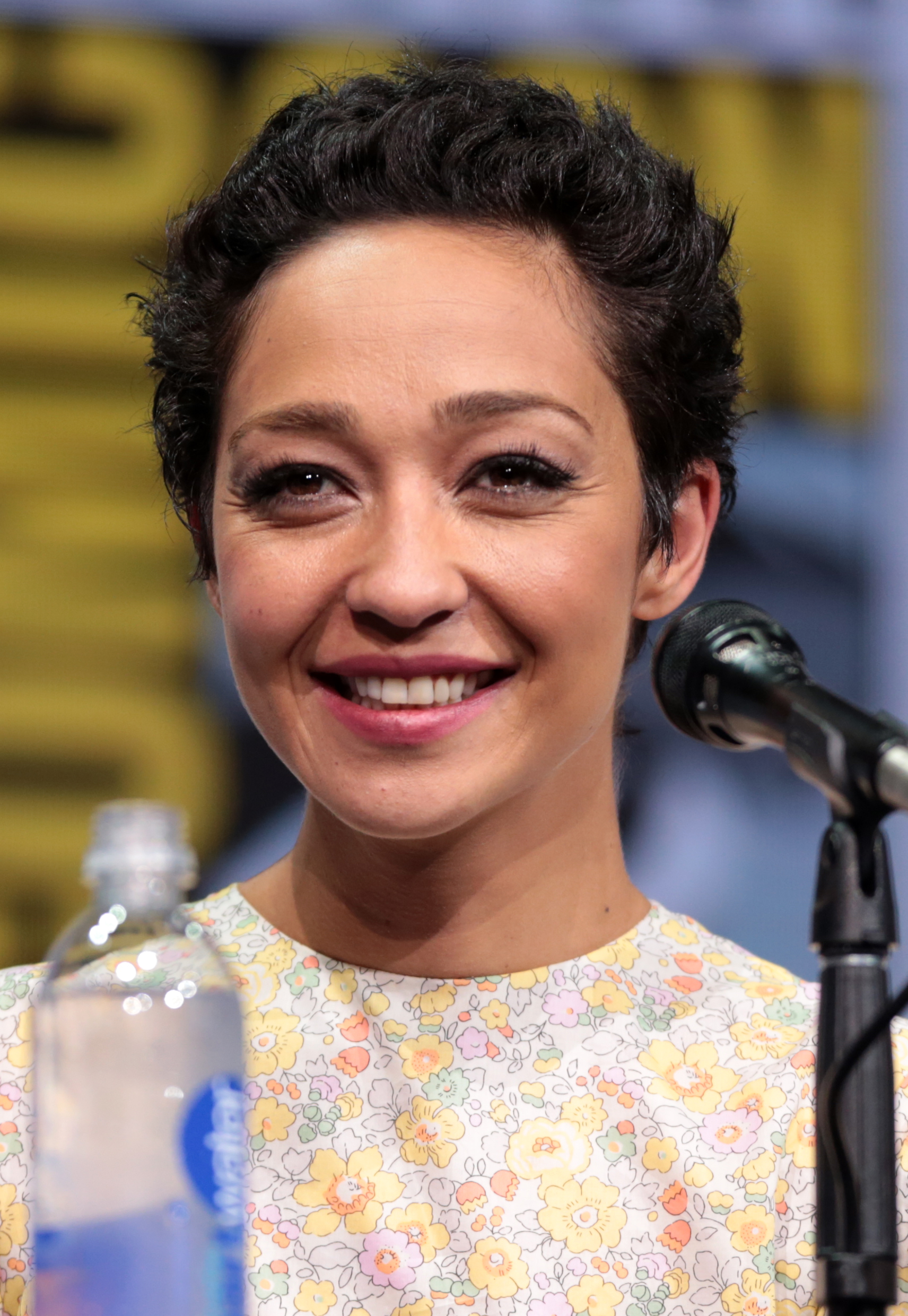
Critics were near unanimous in praise for Ruth Negga's portrayal of Tulip

The pilot of Preacher received acclaim from critics, who praised its acting (particularly by Dominic Cooper, Joseph Gilgun and Ruth Negga), Gilgun's subversion of 'sexy vampire' tropes, Rogen and Goldberg's direction, as well as the dark humorous tonality. Review aggregator Rotten Tomatoes reports a 95% rating, based on 21 reviews with an average score of 8.8/10, with the site's consensus stating, "Despite its departures from the source material Preacher is a funny, gory, over-the-top good time."

James White of Empire spoke most highly of Gilgun's performance, with him writing: "One of the best casting choices in recent memory, [Gilgun] tears it up as Cassidy, bringing his typical sly, chatty confidence to the role, as good as match for his abilities [...]" Melanie McFarland of Variety heralded the pilot by remarking: "[...] Rogen and Goldberg succeeded in realizing what was heretofore considered to be an impossible project — and they've done so with amazing panache". She also praised Gilgun's performance, describing him as: "[...] the real scene stealer, exuding puckish joy in every moment of his performance, but in the quieter moments between Cassidy and Custer, when they gently spar over the validity of basic moral values, he really shines". David Sims, wrote in his review for The Atlantic, "[...] Negga is undoubtedly Preacher's ace card, and Rogen and Goldberg prove they know it, directing her first appearance with gleeful bravura".

In a B+ grade review, The A.V. Club journalist Zack Handlen summarized, "Jesse wants to do good, but over and over again, we see that doing good is never as simple as you want it to be. If the show sticks to that [...] we might be onto something here". The Daily Telegraph's Michael Hogan affirmed that Preacher was "blood-spattered, breakneck-paced and blackly comic".

Jacob Clifton of The Austin Chronicle described the pilot as "Gleefully gory, mysterious to a fault, and carrying all the swagger and smugness of the source material, Preacher's pilot is set just before the comic begins". The Independent's Daniel Dylan Wray appraised the pilot as opening "strongly and with a visceral brutality", adding that the small towns of the locations permeates a "foreboding and ruminating sense of dread". Dylan Wray commended the episode overall, stating that the pilot "[...] fuses the slow, menacing dread of programmes such as True Detective alongside more high-octane supernatural science fiction. It was an auspicious outing and one that has set up an intriguing world and bizarre narrative backdrop to explore further". Melissa Maerz of Entertainment Weekly gave the episode a 'B+' grade, and stated, "Throughout Preacher, you'll switch back and forth between rolling your eyes and not wanting to blink".

Eric Goldman of IGN evaluated the pilot episode as gory, and felt that it to be a respectful interpretation of the source material. He added that: "Rogen, Goldberg, Catlin and their talented cast effortlessly draw you into this world and make it easy to be excited about what's to come on this series". Evan Valentine of Collider scored the film five out of five stars, writing, "ABC's Lost is a prime example of a series that was able to reel audiences in instantly, and Preacher stands shoulder to shoulder with it".

Luke Y. Thompson of Forbes simply wrote, "...the unfilmable has been televised, and so far it's everything it needs to be". Bryan Bishop of The Verge "The Rogen / Goldberg-directed pilot, which airs on May 22nd, is a bizzarro mix of shock gore, adolescent humor, and shattered faith that tees up what could be an oddly compelling TV series". Bishop also commented on the "slow pace" of the pilot, to which he wrote, "[...] there are minor clues that the show is using its slow pace to acclimate the audience in preparation for something that's far more disturbing than anything Rogen and Goldberg serve up in their initial outing". Reflecting on the pilot, JoBlo's Paul Shirey wrote, "There's so much potential and a terrific set-up that should really allow this show to grow, take shape, and make a great compliment [sic] to the series that inspired it". In an A− grade review, Charlie Mason of TVLine summarized, "Praise be! AMC's Preacher... might be just the series that fans of The Walking Dead have been complaining for two years now that Fear the Walking Dead isn't".

Abigail Chandler of The Guardian spoke highly of Rogen and Goldberg involvement, describing them as possibly the "perfect match for Preacher" and acknowledging their "respect for the source material's tone", while summarizing her piece by highlighting the question, "[...] is Seth Rogen's new show the best comic book adaptation ever?"
