= See (Preacher) =

- Preacher episode
- Jesse Custer commands Tracy to open her eyes.
- Episode no.: Season 1 Episode 2
- Directed by: Seth Rogen; Evan Goldberg
- Written by: Sam Catlin
- Cinematography by: John Grillo
- Editing by: Daniel Gabbe
- Original air date: June 5, 2016
- Running time: 49 minutes

Guest appearances
- Jackie Earle Haley as Odin Quincannon; Ricky Mabe as Miles Person; Bonita Friedericy as Terri Loach; Ptolemy Slocum as Linus; Tim Ransom as Mr. Murphy; Gianna Lepera as Tracy Loach

Episode chronology
← Previous "Pilot"	Next → "The Possibilities"

"See" is the second episode of the supernatural drama television series, Preacher, which originally aired on AMC in the United States on June 5, 2016. The episode was written by series showrunner Sam Catlin, and directed by Seth Rogen and Evan Goldberg.

The episode "See" introduces Graham McTavish and Jackie Earle Haley as the Cowboy and Odin Quincannon, respectively. Jesse (Dominic Cooper) begins struggling with God's silence. Cassidy (Joseph Gilgun) opens up to Jesse about his true identity. Government agents Fiore (Tom Brooke) and DeBlanc (Anatol Yusef) sneak into the church for Jesse but Cassidy arrives in time to slaughter the duo. Tulip (Ruth Negga) once again attempts her campaign to recruit Jesse to the dark side. Later, Jesse discovers his new abilities, using them to silence barking dogs and to remove the memory of "the Girl" from the mind of a dangerous pedophile. The episode ends with Jesse using his power to try to revive a girl in a coma.

"See" received praise from critics who noted the outstanding visuals, wonderfully demented set pieces, the fight between Cassidy, Fiore and DeBlanc, and great character moments that provides the series with a thematic throughline beneath the blood and carnage. The episode garnered a Nielsen rating of 0.8 in the 18–49 demographic, translating to 2.08 million viewers.

== Plot ==
=== Prologue, in Texas ===
In 1881, a cowboy (Graham McTavish) leaves his home, searching for medicine for his sick daughter. Along the way, he encounters some travelers from St. Louis, who believe the American frontier was a paradise. The patriarch of the family asks "Do you agree," to the cowboy, "That this is paradise?" The mystery cowboy turns toward his host: "It ain't." The next day, he rides past a hanging tree, dead Native Americans hanging scalped from the branches. He rides his horse straight into Ratwater.

=== Present ===
In the present day, Jesse (Dominic Cooper) baptizes his congregants, with DeBlanc (Anatol Yusef) and Fiore (Tom Brooke) watching from a distance. Tulip (Ruth Negga) asks for her sins to be washed away and is begrudgingly baptized by Jesse. Tulip, once again, asks Jesse for help with that "job". After the baptisms, the congregants head into the church. Cassidy (Joseph Gilgun) asks Emily (Lucy Griffiths) for an advance for "fixing" the air conditioner, which she denies him. Soon after, Emily tells Jesse that Cassidy drank a cask of Communion wine and tells him to drop by and visit Tracy Loach (Gianna Lepera). As the Roots are leaving, a parishioner yells out, "Murderer!". Sheriff Hugo Root (W. Earl Brown) confronts them, but his son tells him to let it go. Meanwhile, Linus (Ptolemy Slocum) confesses to Jesse that he has urges to "do stuff" to a girl he drives on his school bus. Jesse tells Linus that though his urges are wrong, he has not acted upon them and shouldn't. Jesse finishes by telling Linus that he must stop sinning.

Odin Quincannon (Jackie Earle Haley) and his employees arrive at an unnamed couple's home. Odin purchases their land and immediately has his men tear their house down. As Quincannon's men leave, Donnie Schenck (Derek Wilson) breaks Clive's nose against the steering wheel for usurping his position as Quincannon's right-hand man during the visit to the couple's home.

Jesse and Emily solicit suggestions at a local grocery store. During this time, Jesse watches as Linus drives by in his school bus. When Jesse returns to his truck, he finds his steering wheel is missing. Tulip then drives by and mocks Jesse for choosing a dull life. Jesse eventually makes his way back to his church, where he's greeted by Cassidy. Jesse learns from Cassidy that the latter is a vampire. When Cassidy takes a sip from his flask, Jesse asks what it is, and Cassidy states that it is too potent for a human, listing its improbable ingredients. Doubting that Cassidy is a vampire and the potency of the drink, Jesse drains the flask and passes out instantly.

At a hotel, DeBlanc and Fiore leave with a large trunk. During this time, Cassidy takes a cruise in Jesse's truck. DeBlanc and Fiore arrive at All Saints Congregational church, standing over Jesse. The two attempt a mysterious ritual to remove the Genesis with a lullaby, but fail. The two then attempt to release Genesis, revving up a chainsaw to cut Jesse open. Before the two can dismember Jesse, Cassidy returns and calls them out, believing they are vampire-hunters searching for him. Cassidy is shot by DeBlanc, bites into DeBlanc's leg and in the ensuing struggle, bludgeons DeBlanc to death with a large bible. Cassidy then fights Fiore for the chainsaw managing to cut off Fiore's right arm, using Fiore's chainsaw wielding left arm. The chainsaw, with Fiore's right arm still attached, proceeds to move toward an unconscious Jesse, but Cassidy manages to stop it in time.

Meanwhile, at Toadvine Whorehouse, Tulip beats a group of Quincannon Meat & Power employees in a game of poker. After defeating the men, she receives a call from a man called "Danny", telling him she will see him soon. Back at All Saints Congregational, Cassidy cleans up the blood and has DeBlanc and Fiore stuffed in their large trunk. As Cassidy brings them outside to bury them, he's upset as the sun had already risen.

Jesse wakes up shortly after, and Emily brings him a casserole to deliver to Terri Loach when he visits Terri (Bonita Friedericy) and her comatose daughter. As he tries to comfort Terri, she tells Jesse that his words can't heal Tracy. Upon leaving the Loach residence, Jesse sees Linus drive by again. Later while driving at night, Jesse stops to investigate a car seat in the middle of the road, and is stealthily tasered. He awakens to find himself bound in chains, in a room at Toadvine. Soon after, Tulip, revealing herself as Jesse's captor, tells him she won't take the job without him and that she'll keep nagging him until he agrees. Tulip then tells Jesse he will eventually revert to his old ways. When Jesse asks to be released, Tulip comments that there is nothing keeping him there.

Jesse returns to his church to cut the chains off with a saw. He's interrupted by a guilt-ridden Eugene (Ian Colletti), asking to be baptized again. However, Jesse tells him it is too late. Eugene believes that no matter how hard he tries, he will always be the same. Inspired by Eugene's words, Jesse goes to Linus' home, enters uninvited and searches for Linus. Finding him in the bathroom, Jesse confronts Linus quietly, preparing the tub as a baptismal and neatly hanging up his jacket and rolling up his sleeve. All the while, Linus rants penitently. Using the Word of God while "baptizing" Linus again, Jesse commands Linus to "Forget the Girl." Linus' memory of the girl is wiped clean and he's seemingly left confused as to why Jesse's there in the first place.

Cassidy buries the trunk of body parts on a hilltop that features the same tree seen outside of Ratwater in the flashback. The next day, however, the mystery men are back in their motel room being interrogated by Sheriff Root. When asked by the Sheriff who they are, they merely answer, "We're from the Government".

The following day, after witnessing his new powers in action, Jesse visits the Loach residence and tells Tracy that he's going to try something new and tells her to open her eyes.

== Production ==
=== Writing ===
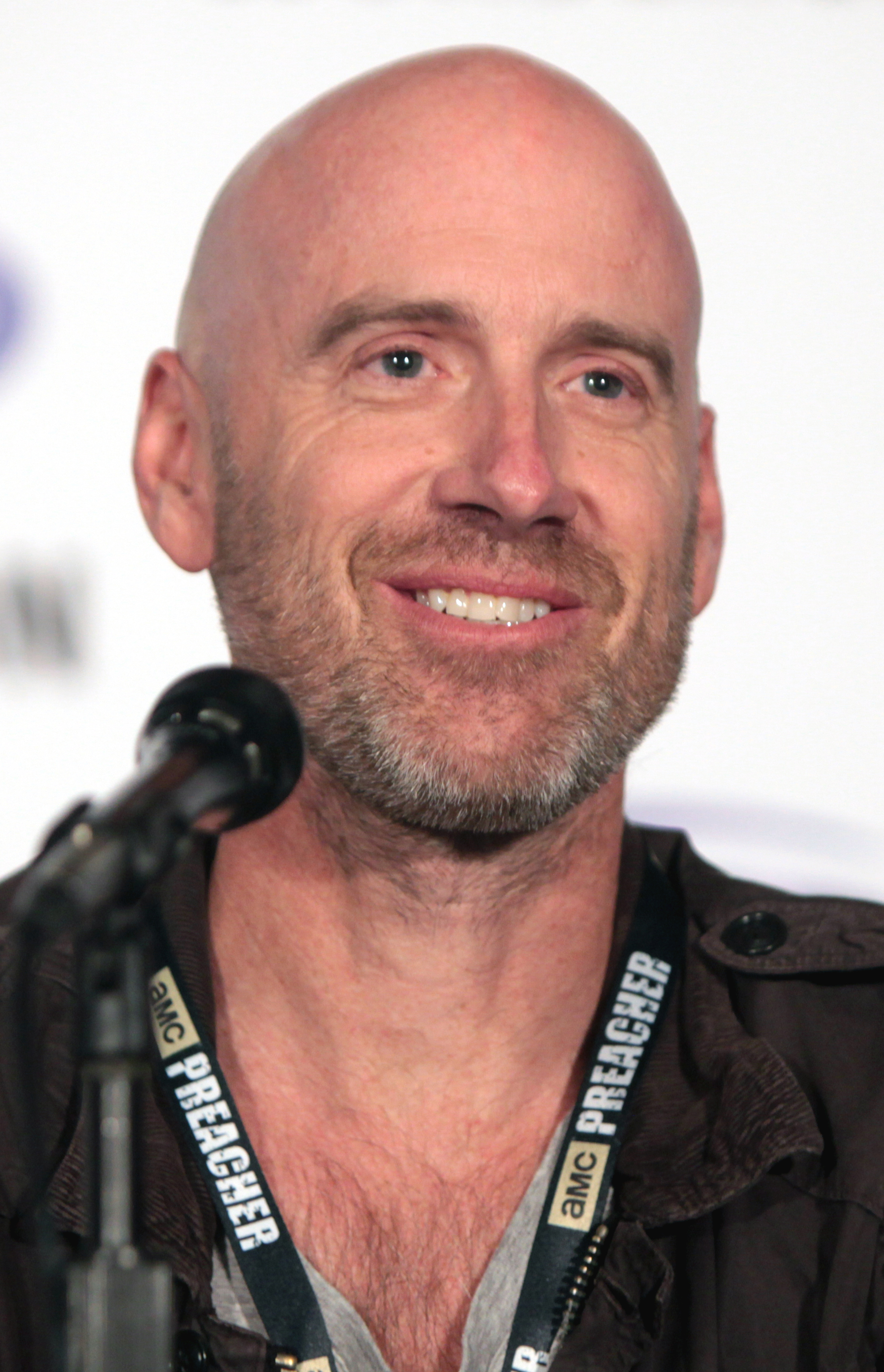
Writer Sam Catlin wrote the screenplay for "See".

"See" was written by the series showrunner Sam Catlin. Some elements in the episode are based on the first seven issues in the Preacher series, Gone to Texas, as well as Ancient History, of which the script was first read and reviewed by Preacher co-creator Garth Ennis, as with the other episodes of the series. The elements adapt, or at least provides allusions to The Saint of Killers from Preacher Special: Saint of Killers, in the form of an opening flashback sequence.

In an interview with The Hollywood Reporter, Catlin acknowledges that it was only a question of when and how the Saint would appear in the series. He describes the Saint "[setting] up an interesting dilemma", as the first season of Preacher is built around the town of Annville. Caitlin remarks that, "The Saint is unstoppable. It works in the comic because Jesse's on the move, but in this, he's not. He's easily found. We didn't want to put off the Saint of Killers, so we felt this was an opportunity to introduce him and have him be in the world and be a character, and in its own way, tell the audience that he's coming and he's connected to everything that's happening and he's connected to the town."

Catlin also spoke of Ennis allowing his team and he to construct the standalone chapters involving the Cowboy, while noting that the end of season one would center on the connection between the Cowboy and Jesse, with Catlin concluding, "The story of the cowboy will continue to be told over the first season. Then, by the end of the first season, you'll realize why he has everything in the world to do with Jesse." Ennis spoke about his feelings of seeing this character come alive on screen: "That was great. That's where I thought, 'Holy f—ing shit, it's a Western.' That goes back to the very beginning, to me being three or four and watching Westerns with my grandfather. It was stunning."

Joseph Gilgun, who has portrays Cassidy, spoke with AMC about Catlin's reference to The Big Lebowski (1998) in "See", with Gilgun expressing, "The first time [Catlin] wrote that, I was furious because I adore The Big Lebowski. I love the Dude and I'd do anything to be him. The story is a fantastic one and we both love the Coen Brothers. He knows that I love The Big Lebowski and he tried to wind me up when he wrote that line."

=== Casting ===
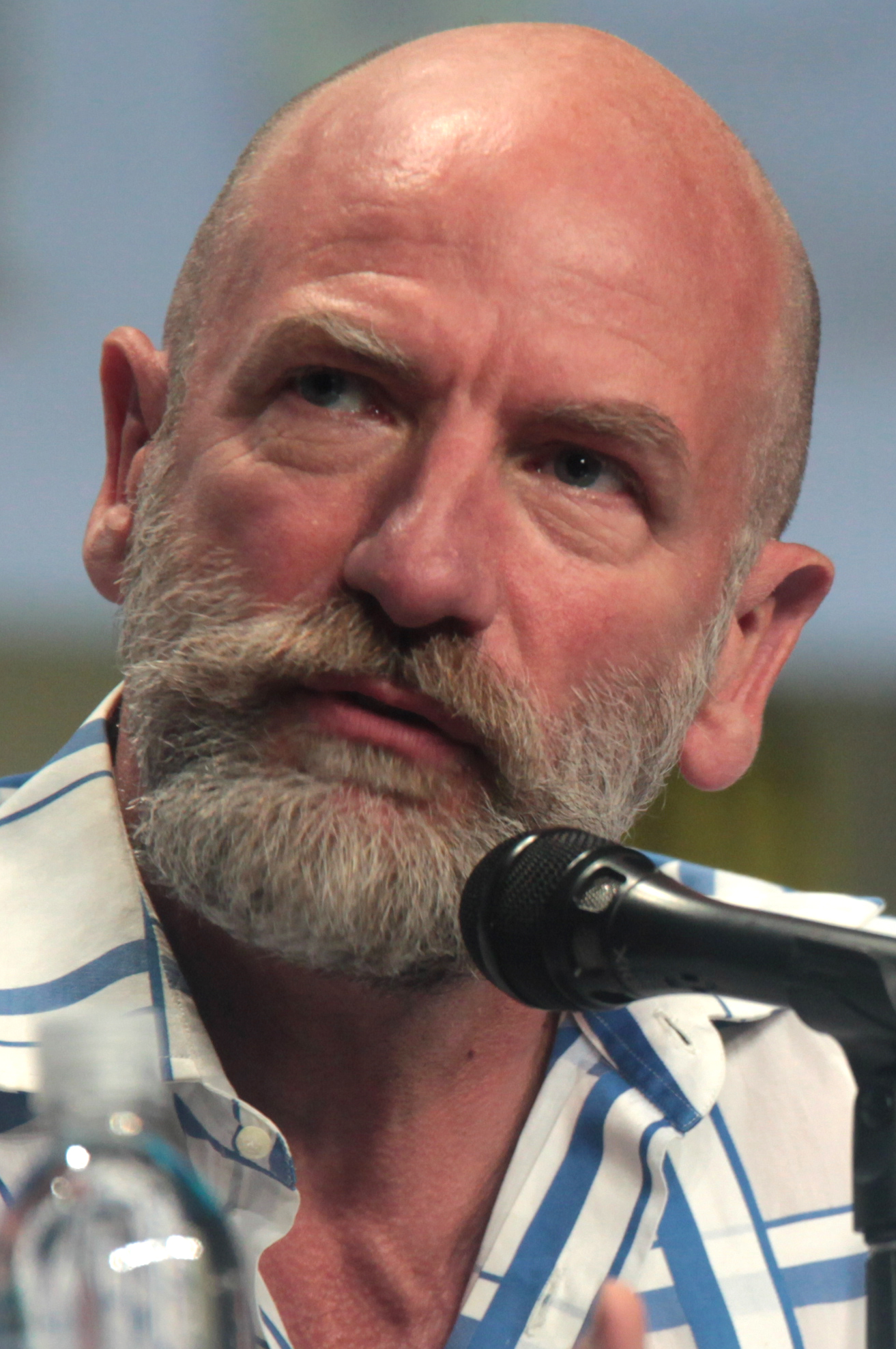
Graham McTavish was cast as the Cowboy in "See".

The episode saw the addition of several new actors to the cast such as Jackie Earle Haley. Earle Haley was cast in the role of Odin Quincannon, whom had previously been referenced in the pilot of the series, and had been described as "[...] a small, decrepit man with the unscrupulous iron will necessary to be the most powerful man in Annville County, Texas. The chief employer in town, Odin runs Quincannon Meat & Power, a 125-year-old family-operated slaughterhouse business." Actor Graham McTavish, known for appearing in The Hobbit Trilogy, was cast as the Cowboy.

Actress Bonita Friedericy, known for her role as Diane Beckman in Chuck, was cast as Terri Loach, with Gianna LePera playing daughter Tracy Loach. "See" shows the introduction of Ptolemy Slocum appearing as Linus, a sick man with an unhealthy interest in a little girl he sees every day in his school bus. The episode also marks the second appearance of the Canadian actor Ricky Mabe as Miles Person.

Derek Wilson was promoted to series regular, with the decision to elevate the role to regular from recurring being made after the pilot was shot.

=== Filming ===
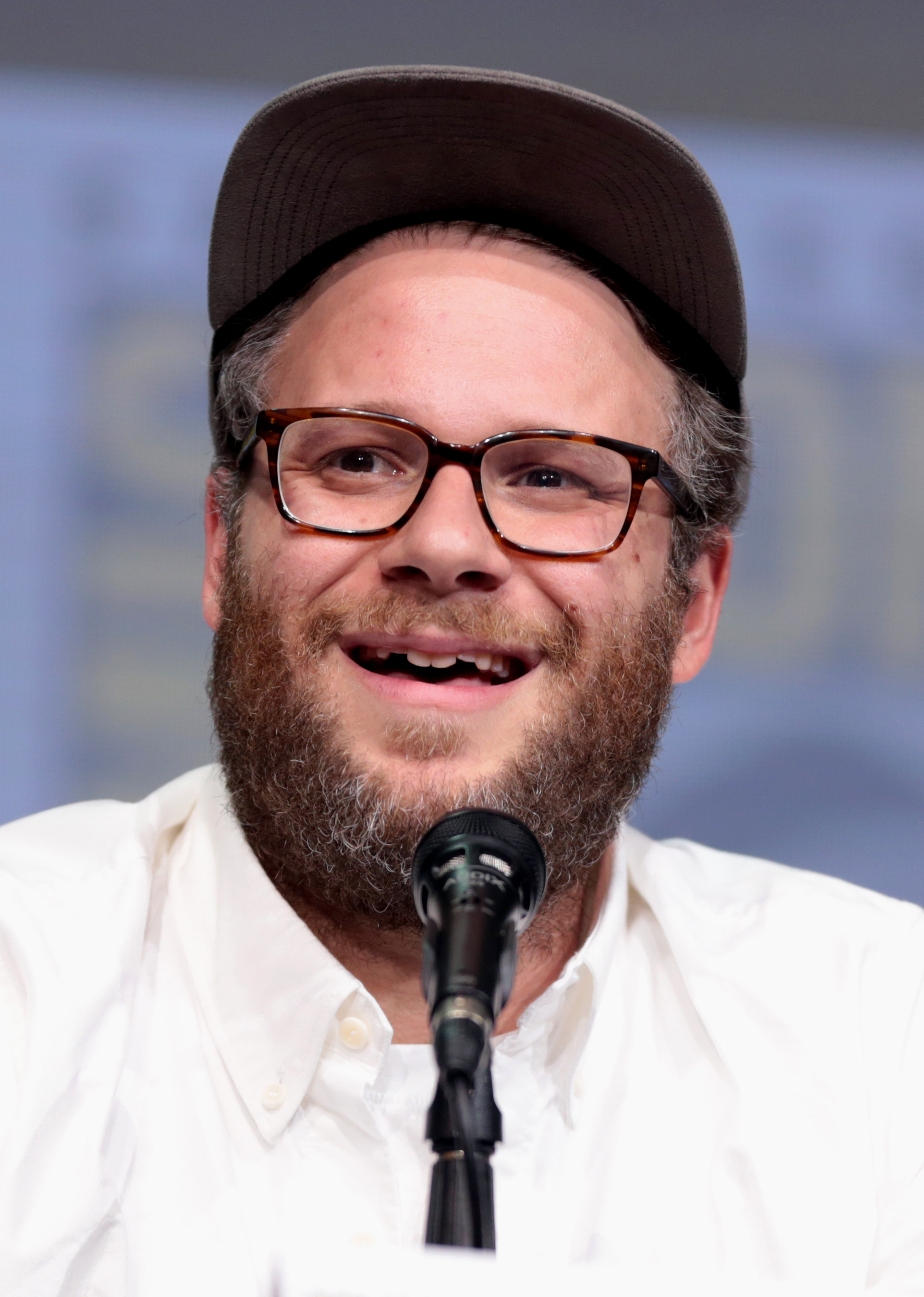
Seth Rogen returned to co-direct with Evan Goldberg.

"See" was directed by series creators Seth Rogen and Evan Goldberg. Rogen and Goldberg also directed the previous episode for Preacher, "Pilot", their directorial debut for the series. Prior to directing for the series, Rogen and Goldberg's directorial filmography included; This Is the End (2013) and The Interview (2014). Shortly after the airing of "See", AMC released a featurette titled "Making Of Preacher: See" which went into greater detail about the creation of the episode, while going behind the scenes of the church chainsaw fight between Cassidy, Fiore and DeBlanc. The episode title is an allusion to the last scene of the episode.

Tom Brooke, who was cast to play Fiore, spoke with Entertainment Weekly in an interview about the filming the fight scene between Cassidy, "I ended up wanting to do a good job for the fight guys, because we spent about a week working on it, and they were so good and helpful that it became really important to make sure that we did right by them. There was so much blood that the carpet tiles in the motel room were sticking to the bottom of our feet. They were soaked in blood." Fellow co-star Anatol Yusef, who portrays DeBlanc, spoke of preparation required to film scene, to which he stated, "It was kind of mad, really, because it was one of the first things, if not the first thing we did. We had a very special stunt team who were very, very helpful. And so we rehearsed it pretty solidly and on the day it went really well. It was an interesting way to establish our characters, our relationship, what we were trying to do. In a way, the actor experience and the character experience was quite similar in trying to get this job done, and, before we were allowed to do it, in walks Cassidy. And Hell ensues."

Yusef noted, about the church scene in an interview with Variety, that the challenge of the scene wasn't remembering the choreography but instead attempting to establish the characters within those scenes, as "[...] it was the first scene we shot after the pilot. These scenes are a bit like a dance and we all dance quite well. On a film, a fight that size, you might have three days but we did it in one. We were really well supported by the stunt team."

Gilgun, spoke of the fun and element of challenge to involve one's self in the choreography and shooting aspects of the fights, specifically that of the episode "See" to which Gilgun stated, "You read it and you're just like, “For f—k's sake! That's so incredibly awesome that I get to do that!” I remember [Goldberg] literally taking me by the collar of my neck and telling me about the chainsaw fight. That's the kind of excitement you're dealing with. You pick up a brand new script and you can't read it fast enough." He continued: "We're a real family and it's organic and very honest on set. When we film the scenes where there's a lot of work involved, everybody knows what to do and is patient with each other. It's always good fun [...] There's a lot to do and we're all friends. I truly believe that the attitude we have towards filming rubs off and you see that."

Rogen and Goldberg film the entire first half of the sequence — from Jesse breaking into the house, to wandering around the various rooms, to punching out Linus, to engaging in a tense stand-off as the tub fills with water — in one continuous take.

=== Cinematography ===
"With 4K raw, you really have the flexibility of fine-tuning your color later in post. Since I don't have a DIT, the simplest way to work is to just pick one LUT and work with it. I add and subtract to it with filters. For example, if I want to make something warmer, I'll add an 81EF to the shot, or if I'm shooting at night and I want to make it bluer, I'll add a light blue filter. Those are the kinds of things that keep it simple for me."

— Cinematographer John Grillo, on the practice of recording his 4K files to Sony's AXS-R5 raw recorder on Preacher

"See" was shot with the Sony F55 in 4K raw in a distributed aspect ratio of 16:9 by John Grillo. For lenses, Grillo uses Panavision PVintage primes, which are rehoused Ultra Speeds from the 1970s. He also uses Angenieux Optimo lenses, including the 15-40, 28-76, 45-120 and 24-290mm. Grillo used a Tiffen Black Pro-Mist 1/8 filter in front of the lens, as according to Grillo it "helps take some of the edge off the sharpness of the sensor. We have some characters who wear prosthetics, so it definitely helps."

Cinematographer Grillo took inspiration from the "Pilot", and admired Bill Pope's ability to balance all the comic book elements of Preacher, which includes dark comedy, gore, horror and drama, though Grillo remarked that one of his biggest challenges was the visual translation of the graphic novel format into that of the language of cinema, to which he stated, "Usually graphic novels have a loose way of framing. There are rectangles, squares, ovals, and sometimes no frame at all. One shot that's extreme wide can lead to another shot that is an extreme close-up on someone's eyes. The graphic novel can pretty much do anything that it puts its mind to, while filmmakers have certain limitations that we have to adhere to: time, budget, schedules, etc. It's been a challenge to visually amp it up, but I think we've been quite successful."

Grillo spoke of another challenge in the form of sans luxury of preparation, as had very little time to prep episodes with each director, which included, Michael Slovis, Craig Zisk, Scott Winant, Guillermo Navarro, Michael Morris and Kate Dennis, including a short shooting schedule of eight days per show. To deal with his challenge Grillo typically sent gaffer Jim Tynes and key grip Pat Daily on tech scouts; with both men coming back with photos, videos and drawings of each location for him, with Grillo acknowledging that working in this format makes him "very nimble".

For the American frontier, particularly the prologue in "See", Grillo looked at a number of Andrew Wyeth paintings for their "simplicity, framing and textures." He also looked at films such as Terrence Malick's Badlands (1973) and Joel and Ethan Coen's No Country for Old Men (2007) for their "Americana-influenced" feel. According to Grillo, Albuquerque has a certain color and quality of light that consists mainly of browns, yellows and golden sunlight, which he also incorporates into the look.

He stated that there haven't been many lighting challenges, although Albuquerque's clouds are "very choppy" and can go from shadow to sunlight in a single take. For interiors, Grillo often uses a particular photograph by Robert Frank: "It's shot in a dive bar where there are really hot windows and it's kind of smoky". Grillo continues by adding, "There's smoke, sunlight coming through the windows, and you can see the shafts of light and it's kind of burned out and [contrasty]. Sometimes an image stays in your head and you apply it to your work. There are two or three sets that I light this way."

Grillo concluded by praising the cast of Preacher, with him remarking, "My job has been to give them a platform to do their thing, in terms of framing, composition and lighting. We have a fantastic cast and they're just so interesting to look at. The actors have found each character so perfectly that it's fun coming to set every day."

=== Visual effects ===
Kevin Lingenfelser was the overall Visual Effects Supervisor and visual effects company FuseFX worked on most of the visual effects for "See".

=== Marketing ===
Prior to Preacher's public release, AMC provided the first four episodes of the season 1 for review, only available to critics. On May 23, 2016, AMC released a new teaser trailer for the upcoming episode "See", as well as the official synopsis of the episode. AMC debuted a sneak peek on June 2, 2016, featuring new footage from "See" with Ruth Negga, as well an exclusive clip from "See," with Fiore and DeBlanc performing a strange ritual over Jesse's unconscious body. On June 4, 2016, the third new footage from "See" featuring Negga and Dominic Cooper, respectively, debuted on Twitter.

On June 6, 2016, Entertainment Weekly's weekly column, The Entertainment Geekly, began podcasting Preacher to which issues regarding problems, spoilers, as well as the addressing the complete run of the original Preacher were discussed. Following the premiere of "See", Entertainment Weekly unveiled the main title sequence of Preacher, featuring music from composer Dave Porter, which made its debut in the opening credits of the third episode, "The Possibilities". Prior to the premiere of "See", Funko had unveiled three more upcoming range of Pop! Television Vinyl figures which include Jesse Custer, Tulip O'Hare and Cassidy, set to be released in the summer of 2016.

On June 6, 2016, Preacher's "See" became available to stream or purchase on AMC.com's website, iTunes, Amazon, Google Play, Xbox Video and more.

== Themes ==
Free will is an underlying theme in "See". Cooper acknowledges that Jesse makes all the wrong choices with this newly bequeathed gift, while commenting on the "despicable" manner in which he handles this power. Though Cooper makes mention of the storyline in which Custer asks Tracy to open her eyes:

[...] It's so true, it wouldn't do anything. It wouldn't change her ... He misses the fundamental points, and you can't force someone to make those decisions. They have to learn them, they have to discover those things for themselves. That's why he has no idea. He's completely useless, ultimately. You [still] can't help but appreciate what he's trying to do ... You're filming this stuff so quickly, it's on from one scene to the next, and you forget there were moments like that, where he's completely missed the whole point of everything.

Cooper, in an interview with The Wall Street Journal, insisted that Jesse hasn't completely lost his faith, more so struggling with it, as he stated, "[...] struggling with it because of this silence ... he's deafened by the silence because he's made the decision to leave the life of crime he'd been leading and to remember what was important to him, and the memory of his father. But he's getting no direction, he's getting no help. He's feeling alone. There's all of these wonderful bits of writing that keep coming about. “We are who we are.” And it's like, “Actually, maybe I am just this piece of crap who can't change."

== Reception ==
=== Ratings ===
"See" was viewed by 2.08 million American households on its initial viewing, which was slightly less than the previous two weeks' rating of 2.38 million viewers for the episode "Pilot", airing opposite Game of Thrones and without the benefit of Fear the Walking Dead as a lead-in. The episode also acquired a 0.8 rating in the 18–49 demographic, making it the fifth-highest rated show on cable television of the night.

=== Critical reception ===
"See" was praised by critics, who noted the outstanding visuals, wonderfully demented set pieces, the fight between Cassidy, Fiore and DeBlanc, and great character moments that provides the series with a thematic throughline beneath all the blood and carnage. Review aggregator Rotten Tomatoes gave the episode a 95% rating, based on 22 reviews with an average score of 7.5/10, with the site's consensus stating, ""See" asks more questions than it answers, but the cavalcade of entertaining characters and innovative sequences is enough to keep us coming back."

Emma Fraser of Observer spoke most highly of Ruth Negga's performance, with her writing: "'[...] Preacher is only two episodes in, but it is clear that Tulip is a TV style icon we need [...] There's toughness to her demeanor and yet her costuming has flashes of femininity mixed in with leather, jeans and boots", while fellow journalist Sean T Collins highly praised the performance from Joseph Gilgun, by stating, "This dude is a fucking supernova in this role, for real. He has the rangy physicality of a guy who's had just enough to drink to give his every movement a tiny bit more momentum than required to get the job done — he always seems to be leaning, slouching, lunging, weaving, careening, even when sitting still." Zack Handlen of The A.V. Club gave the episode an 'A−' grade, and described it as "the start of something new".

Eric Goldman of IGN evaluated "See" as a "[...] very good hour of TV, with a lot of entertaining moments". He added that: "The second episode of Preacher slowed down from the pilot, as we got some interesting new elements but left things murky as far as what's going on with the overall mysterious situation and where things are headed." Goldman praised the opening flashback sequence, Cassidy vs. Fiore and DeBlanc, and Jesse's confrontation with Linus. Evan Valentine of Collider scored "See" four stars, writing, "The series continues to be extremely solid and the cast is firing on all cylinders fairly early, which is a feat unto itself."

James White of Empire reacted positively to "See", remarking that "[...] Catlin, [Rogen] and [Goldberg] are going to take their inspiration from Breaking Bad [...], and let things unfold at a leisurely pace", and exclaiming that the "fight between Cassidy, Fiore and DeBlanc. Blood, guts, and a scene that wouldn't look out of place in an Evil Dead movie." Scott Meslow of Vulture, gave "See" a four-star rating and said: "We're just two episodes into Preacher, but the series has already raised difficult, fascinating questions. Jesse is certainly grappling with these questions as he tests the limits of his powers." Mark Rozeman wrote, in his review for Paste, "“See” proves to be every bit as rich as the pilot entry, with outstanding visuals, wonderfully demented set pieces and great character moments that provides the series with a thematic throughline beneath all the blood and carnage." Kimber Myers of The Playlist highly praised "See", commenting that it "successfully whipsaws between contemplating the nature of good and evil and covering the screen with blood while referencing Scarface."

JoBlo's Paul Shirey appraised the episode as "a great follow-up to the pilot, which builds on every character and their place in the show. It's a slower burn, but not without progress, especially in highlighting Jesse's internal struggle with being a good Preacher, while fighting his true nature to accomplish said good in more violent means." Shirey spoke highly of Coopers's performance whilst commending "[...] the interactions between Jesse and Cassidy". PopMatters writer Sean Fennell felt that "See" was an extension of the pilot; "[...] striking the same impressive balance of unadulterated rambunctiousness and clever, well-placed exposition, making its ongoing world-building process feel effortless." Jeff Stone of Indiewire gave the episode a 'B+' grade, and stated, "Preacher is playing a long game when it comes to getting to the comic's central premise, but the major players are being set up."

Cory Barker of TV Guide summarized that, "[...] it managed to produce such a fun, propulsive second episode without the normal post-pilot drop-off is both an achievement in of itself, and a great sign for the rest of Season 1 and beyond." Barker also commented that: "the church sequence ran the gamut from intensely violent to surprisingly comedic, striking a tonal balance that simply shouldn't work... But does." Alan Sepinwall of HitFix praised the Rogen and Goldberg's presentation of their "gorgeous bit of imagery", such as, "Jesse baptizing his flock, the camera remaining lock still as the house Odin Quincannon has just bought is bulldozed; Cassidy staring wistfully out at the open plains when he realizes it's now too light for him to safely go outside, and every beat of bonkers, intricately-choreographed action when Cassidy takes on the two mystery men at the church."
