= Lucy Griffiths (actress, born 1986) =

English actress (born 1986)

- Born: Lucy Ursula Griffiths; 10 October 1986 (age 39); Brighton, East Sussex, England
- Occupation: Actress
- Years active: 2000–present
- Height: 5 ft 7 in (170 cm)

Lucy Ursula Griffiths (born 10 October 1986) is an English actress known for her roles as Lady Marian in the BBC drama series Robin Hood (2006–09), as Nora Gainesborough, Eric Northman's vampire "sister", in the HBO horror series True Blood (2012–13) and as Emily Woodrow in the AMC supernatural drama series Preacher (2016).

== Life and career ==
Born in Brighton, Griffiths was educated at Windlesham House School, Roedean School, Dorothy Stringer High School and Varndean College. She is a former member of the National Youth Music Theatre and Youth Music Theatre UK.

She first appeared on television in Sea of Souls and then Sugar Rush, and on stage in The White Devil. In February 2006 it was announced she would be playing a "feisty", beautiful Marian in the BBC family drama series Robin Hood, alongside Jonas Armstrong. Griffiths has said that her character "has been written as an intelligent, witty, biting character, and that's how I expected her to be."

Griffiths returned as Marian in the second series of Robin Hood in 2007, but her character was killed off in the final episode. Though this decision proved unpopular with fans of the series, it is said on a BBC Nottingham page that she left the show to pursue 'other opportunities'. It has been rumored that she wanted to leave the show to further her career in Hollywood. However, other sources say she was written out to allow the show to be taken in a new direction. She returned in the series finale a year later as a spectral vision of Marian.

In 2009, she made her West End debut in a revival of Arcadia and appeared in the ITV1 drama Collision. On 5 September 2010, she appeared in the ITV drama U Be Dead, playing Bethan Ancell and on 1 November 2010 she starred in ITV drama The Little House.

In January 2011, Griffiths signed a talent holding deal with American television network CBS. It had been announced that she would play Jenna Lestrade, the lead in the CW zombie pilot Awakening, however the show did not go ahead.

In November 2011, it was revealed that Griffiths would play Nora, the sister of vampire Eric Northman (Alexander Skarsgård), in the fifth season of HBO's True Blood. Nora is not a character in the Southern Vampire Mysteries (the books the TV series is based on) but she has been described as "intelligent, intimidating, cool under pressure and a very good liar" according to TV Line. During November 2011 Griffiths also appeared on stage at the Finborough Theatre, London, in the play Atman by Iain Finlay Macleod.

She voiced Mabel Dobbs in the Big Finish Productions Doctor Who audio drama The Auntie Matter, which was released in January 2013.

She has a diploma in mime from a Parisian school and says Marcel Marceau was her greatest influence into the artistry of emotions and actions without words. She also admires performances of Judi Dench, Kate Winslet, and Jennifer Saunders.

Griffiths was originally cast in Constantine as the female lead Liv Aberdine, the daughter of a late friend, who comes to discover that she has the ability of seeing the supernatural world among us. She teams up with Constantine to fight the demons who have targeted her and learn more about her late father. Griffiths was dropped after Goyer and Cerone decided to take the series in a different creative direction. Instead, the original comic character Zed was written in. It was later announced that Angélica Celaya would fill the role. Some of Griffiths' final scenes in the pilot were reshot to explain why her character doesn't join Constantine in his adventures, as had been foreshadowed and originally intended.

In April 2015 Griffiths was cast in the AMC series Preacher as Emily Woodrow, a character described as a "no-nonsense" single mother, waitress, church organist, bookkeeper and the loyal right hand of Jesse Custer (Dominic Cooper).

== Filmography ==
=== Film ===
Year	Title	Role	Notes
2011	Billboard	The Ex	
2013	The Numbers Station	Meredith	
2014	A New York Winter's Tale	Young Woman [Peter's mother]	Alternative title: Winter's Tale
2014	Don't Look Back	Nora Clark	
2014	Last Summer	Rebecca	
2014	Home for Christmas	Alice	
2015	Uncanny	Joy Andrews	Alternative title: Android
2017	The Price	Liz Sloane	

=== Television ===
Year	Title	Role	Notes
2006	Sea of Souls	Rebecca	Episode: "Succubus"
2006	Sugar Rush	Lettie	Episode #2.2
2006–09	Robin Hood	Marian	Main role, 26 episodes
2009	U Be Dead	Bethan Ancell	Television movie
2009	Collision	Jane Tarrant	5 episodes
2010	Lewis	Madeline Escher	Episode: "Falling Darkness"
2010	The Little House	Ruth	Television miniseries (2 episodes)
2011	Awakening	Jenna Lestrade	Television movie
2012–13	True Blood	Nora Gainesborough	Main role (seasons 5 & 6)
2014	Constantine	Liv Aberdine	Episode: "Non Est Asylum"
2016	Preacher	Emily Woodrow	Main role (season 1)
2021	Shadow and Bone	Luda	Episode: "The Unsea"
2021	Vienna Blood	Amelia Lydgate	3 episodes
2022	Death in Paradise	Katie Kellar	S11 Ep3

=== Video games ===
Year	Title	Role	Notes
2011	Dirt 3	Business Manager	Voice
2024	The Casting of Frank Stone	Linda Castle	Voice
2025	Eriksholm: The Stolen Dream	Alva	Voice

== Theatre roles ==
Year	Play	Role	Venue	Notes
2000	Otello	Children's Chorus	Glyndebourne Opera House, Glyndebourne	
2001	La bohème	Children's Chorus	Glyndebourne Opera House, Glyndebourne	
2002	The Crucible	Mary Warren	Brighton Little Theatre, Brighton	
2004	Les Misérables	Éponine	Gardner Arts Centre, Brighton	
2004	Amy's Wedding	Amy	The Garage Theatre, Norwich	
2004	The Man of Mode	Lady Woodvill	Pavilion Theatre, Brighton	
2005	Strangers	Evie	Piccadilly Theatre, London	
2006	The White Devil	Marcello/Giovanni	Pavilion Theatre, Brighton	
2009	Arcadia	Chloe Coverly	Duke of York's Theatre, London	
2011	Atman	A	Finborough Theatre, London	
