= Sundown =

Sundown is a synonym for sunset.

Sundown may also refer to:

== Places ==
=== Australia ===
- Sundown, Queensland, a locality in the Southern Downs Region
- Sundown National Park, Queensland, Australia

=== Canada ===
- Sundown, Manitoba, Canada, a small hamlet

=== United States ===
- Sundown, Missouri, an unincorporated community
- Sundown, New York, a hamlet
- Sundown, Texas, a city
- Sundown Township, Redwood County, Minnesota
- Sundown Wild Forest, a Forest in Ulster and Sullivan County, New York.

== Arts and entertainment ==
=== Film and television ===
- Sundown (1924 film), a lost silent film starring Bessie Love
- Sundown (1941 film), a film directed by Henry Hathaway
- Sundown (2016 film), a Mexican-American film
- Sundown (2021 film), a French-Mexican film
- Sundown: The Vampire in Retreat (1991), a film starring David Carradine
- "Sundown" (Lost), an episode of Lost
- "Sundown", the two-part season one finale of Legion of Super Heroes

=== Music ===
- Sundown (band), a late 1990s gothic metal band

==== Albums ====
- Sundown (Gordon Lightfoot album)
- Sundown (Richard Marx album)
- Sundown, a 1979 album from Lonnie Donegan
- Sundown (Rank and File album)
- Sundown (Cemetary album)
- Sundown (S Club 8 album)
- Sundown (Eddie Chacon album)

==== Songs ====
- "Sundown" (Gordon Lightfoot song)
- "Sundown" (S Club 8 song)
- "Sundown" (Six60 song)
- "Sundown" (Fireball Ministry song)
- "Sundown", a song by Hale from Above, Over and Beyond
- "Sundown (Back in the Briars)", a song by Iron & Wine from Ghost on Ghost
- "Sundown", a song by The Jesus and Mary Chain from Honey's Dead
- "Sundown", a song by Zara Larsson featuring Wizkid from So Good (Zara Larsson album)
- "Sundown", a song by Starflyer 59 from The Fashion Focus
- "Sundown", a song by Bruce Springsteen from Western Stars

=== Other ===
- Sundown (video game), a cancelled video game
- Sundown, a 1934 novel by John Joseph Mathews
- Walker "Sundown" Calhoun, a character in the animated series C.O.P.S.
- Sundown, call sign of a fighter pilot in the film Top Gun

== Sports ==
- Mamelodi Sundowns F.C., a South African team
- Manzini Sundowns F.C., a Swazi team
- Njube Sundowns F.C., a Zimbabwean team

== See also ==
- Sundowner (disambiguation)
- Sundowning (disambiguation)
- Sundown town, all-white municipalities that prohibit black people from being in the town after sunset
