= Sundowner =

Sundowner or Sundowners may refer to:

== Books ==
- The Sundowners (novel), by Jon Cleary, 1952
- Sundowners, a novel by Lesley Lokko
- Sundowners, a comic book by Tim Seeley

== Film and television ==
- The Sundowner (1911 film), an Australian lost film
- The Sundowners (1950 film), American Western film directed by George Templeton
- The Sundowners (1960 film), an adventure drama film and adaptation of the Cleary novel
- The Sundowner (2010 film), an American documentary short
- Sundowners (2017 film), a Canadian comedy film directed by Pavan Moondi
- "Sundowner" (Preacher), a 2016 television series episode

== Music ==
- The Sundowners (band), a 1960s American rock and roll band
- Sundowner (band), the solo acoustic project of Chris McCaughan
- The Sundowners (Australian band), an Australian "bush band"
- "Sundowner," a 2011 track by British electronic artist Blanck Mass, rearranged for the London Symphony Orchestra for use in the 2012 Summer Olympics opening ceremony
- Sundowner (album), a 2020 album by Kevin Morby
- Sundowner (song), A song off Fontaines D.C's 2024 album Romance

== Vehicles ==
- Sundowner (yacht), a 1912 yacht once owned by Charles Lightoller
- Beechcraft Sundowner, a single-engined, low-wing, light aircraft
- Ultra-Fab Sundowner, an ultralight aircraft
- Sundowner, a model of the AMC Pacer compact automobile
- Sundowner, the B2000 model of the Mazda B-Series pickup truck
- Ford Sundowner, a famous late 70s Australian-market Ford Falcon or Ford Escort panel van trim package
- Sundowner, an Australian railway carriage converted into the Silver Star Cafe in Port Hedland, Western Australia

== Other uses ==
- Sundowner (hotel and casino), a former property in Reno, Nevada
- Sundowner winds, a local wind condition in Southern California
- A person suffering from sundowning, a neurological phenomenon
- A moniker for three United States Navy fighter squadrons, all officially designated as VF-111
- An obsolete Australian and New Zealand variant term for a swagman
- A trademark of the Cripps Red apple
- Sundowner, an antagonist in the 2013 video game Metal Gear Rising: Revengeance
- Sundowner town, in the United States, an alternative term for sundown town, where non-white residents are not allowed
- Neoregelia Sundowner, a cultivar of the Neoregelia carolinae plant species
- Sphingomorpha chlorea, a moth called the sundowner
- A cocktail served at sunset. This term was coined in British colonial times when drinking gin and tonic
