= Quincannon =

Quincannon may refer to:

- Odin Quincannon, character in the comic book series Preacher
- Conan Quincannon, character in the comic book series Preacher
- Judge Francis J. Quinncannon, character in the 1945 film And Then There Were None
- Sgt. Quinncannon, character in She Wore a Yellow Ribbon and Rio Grande, two westerns directed by John Ford which belong to the cavalry trilogy
