= Jesse Custer =

Fictional character in DC Comics

- Preacher character
- Publisher: DC Comics
- First appearance: Comic book series: Preacher #1 (April 10, 1995); Television series: "Pilot"; Preacher Season 1×1; (May 22, 2016)
- Last appearance: Comic book series: Preacher #66 (October 1, 2000); Television series: "End of the World"; Preacher Season 4×10; (September 29, 2019)
- Created by: Garth Ennis and Steve Dillon (comic book series); Sam Catlin, Seth Rogen & Evan Goldberg (television series)
- Portrayed by: Dominic Cooper

In-universe information
- Full name: Jesse L'Angelle Custer
- Aliases: The Preacher; The Reverend
- Species: Human (magically mutated)
- Gender: Male
- Occupation: Preacher
- Weapon: The Word of God (Genesis)
- Family: Marie L'Angell (grandmother); John Custer (father); Christina L'Angell (mother); Allfather (cousin); Unnamed grandchildren (television series)
- Spouse: Tulip O'Hare (television series)
- Significant others: Tulip O'Hare; Lorie Bobbs; Cindy
- Children: Lucy O'Hare-Custer (daughter; television series)
- Origin: Annville, Texas
- Nationality: American
- Partner: Tulip O'Hare; Proinsias Cassidy
- Abilities: Highly skilled in hand-to-hand combat

The Reverend Jesse Custer is the fictional protagonist of the comic book series Preacher, created by writer Garth Ennis and artist Steve Dillon (with a large percentage of the original cover art painted by Glenn Fabry), and published by the Vertigo imprint of DC Comics.

He was ranked the 11th Greatest Comic Book Character by Empire. In 2011, IGN ranked Jesse Custer 34th in the Top 100 Comic Book Heroes.

Dominic Cooper portrayed the live action version of the character in the television series Preacher.

== Character history ==
=== Comic book ===
Jesse Custer was born on January 17, 1975 son of John Custer, a U.S. Marine from Texas, and Christina L'Angelle, a troubled runaway. The couple met in 1973 when Christina, encouraged by the Vietnam War-protesting group she was traveling with, spat in the eye of the first soldier she saw returning from overseas. Despite the assault, the two recognized a sense of displacement in each other, and a relationship formed. Quickly, John and Christina fell deeply in love and later gave birth to a son, Jesse.

=== TV Series ===
Jesse Custer was born January 17,1989, son of John Custer, a U.S. Marine and preacher from Annville Texas, and Christina L'Angelle, a troubled runaway from Louisiana trying to escape Angelville and the depravity of her wicked mother. She became pregnant with Jesse. After his birth she left him with his father in Texas to protect him from her family.

During Jesse's early years, his father instilled a love of cowboys and justice in him. Their happiness was short-lived, as Christina's grandmother tortured and cut out information from his mother finally locating their whereabouts in 1998 with the intention of bringing young Jesse home. Psychotic thugs Jody and T.C. murdered John in front of Jesse.

9 yr old Jesse was taken back to the family home and introduced to his malicious, intelligent, and decrepit Grandma, who began to teach him to both love and fear God.

After that, Jesse was stuck with his new family, his only friend Billy-Bob, a one-eyed, inbred swamp-dweller. Gradually his family managed to cruelly take these from him, too. Jesse was educated largely by sadistic Jody and TC taught him mechanics, fighting, and shooting. He was frequently punished by being placed in an airtight coffin and then submerged at the bottom of a river. Jesse's sanity was held intact by the company of a spirit taking the form of cowboy legend John Wayne. Whether this spirit is a genuine manifestation of the Western hero or simply a coping mechanism spawned from his movie-watching history with his father is uncertain. In either case, there's no question that Wayne held him together.

By 15, the death of his parents and his best friend Billy-Bob gave Jesse the necessary drive to escape the L'Angelle family and run away.

=== After Angelville ===
Jesse is a cocky young man, using his skills and good looks to get easy money. Eventually, returns Annville Texas to find Tulip O'Hare. The two fell in love as kids, along with Jesse and Tulip's friend, pursued a life of crime, stealing expensive cars without getting caught.

Jesse and Tulip enjoyed a high life of crime and sex on the highways. Jesse planned on proposing to Tulip after finding out she is pregnant but after a robbery goes bad, their friend betrays them. She's injured and miscarries their child, and they go their separate ways for a while. He began practicing as reverend to an ungrateful and ignorant Annville Texas.

Soon enough, the John Wayne spirit that had appeared to Jesse now refused to talk to him. Jesse's desire to point out the hypocrisy of his congregations' lives was finally resolved when he chanced to encounter the comedian Bill Hicks (in either Dallas or Houston, as Jesse was a trifle too drunk to remember properly). Watching the performance of Hicks' cynical, caustic yet utterly truthful wit inspired Jesse to live to a higher standard; when he heard of Hicks' death, he decided to confront his congregation in the local bar, where he pointed out the residents' dirty little secrets. Eventually, Jesse was cut short when he accused a drunk of having raped a hitchhiker. The rapist, whose father had paid off the judge, beat Jesse unconscious with a pool cue.

=== Finding God ===
==== Genesis ====
Jesse is struck by a supernatural force later identified as Genesis, grafting itself to Jesse's soul and releasing an explosion of energy that destroys the church and the town, killing the whole population.

Through subsequent bloodshed and black humor, the following is revealed:

- Merging with Genesis has given Jesse "the Word of God", a power which forces the listener to obediently follow his commands, so long as the listener can hear and comprehend what is said. This power is signified by Jesse's eyes glowing an eerie red.
- The highly charismatic Cassidy, while appearing to be human, is actually a vampire well into his 90s.
- The mysterious cowboy is the unstoppable Saint of Killers, sent on a mission from Heaven to find Jesse and subsequently Genesis.
- Genesis is the result of a sexual union between an angel and a demon, something not defined by good or evil, and perhaps more powerful than God Himself. It escaped its confinement in Heaven and fled to Earth, finding Jesse.
- When Genesis was born, God left Heaven, and no one knows where He went or why.

Jesse's quest for God takes the form of an unconventional road trip. He visits many American landmarks, including New York City, Texas, San Francisco, and New Orleans.

==== Family reunion ====
Jesse is once again captured by Jody and T.C., who had almost given up on finding him again. Jody shoots Tulip but the following day, God visits Tulip's corpse and returns her to life, commanding her to persuade Jesse to give up his quest. Eventually Jesse and Tulip reunite.

==== Cassidy and the Grail ====
While helping Cassidy track down the man responsible for giving his junkie girlfriend a large amount of heroin to stash, Jesse meets The Grail, a sinister organization who have been tasked with finding and capturing Jesse. The secret society is headed by a pope-like figure named Allfather D'Aronique, and his right-hand man, The Sacred Executioner, a German military expert referred to as Herr Starr. While the All-Father wishes to capture Jesse in retaliation for the death of his distant aunt (Jesse's grandmother), Starr heard of Jesse's power and planned to use him to bring on Armageddon so they could take over the world.

==== Betrayal and salvation ====
Jesse is found by a hermit in the desert, having lost his memory of his encounter with God. After recuperating for a month, Jesse sets off to find Tulip and Cassidy. When he finds them, he sees Cassidy embracing Tulip intimately and, believing that Tulip has made her peace and moved on, Jesse temporarily puts his quest for God on the back burner and finds himself in a small town named Salvation which is being abused by a local meat industrialist, a diminutive man named Odin Quincannon, and his band of thugs.

=== "The End of the Road" ===
Jesse eventually discovers that Tulip had never truly betrayed him to Cassidy, as he had kept her dependent on drugs and alcohol after she thought Jesse had died.

Cassidy and Jesse somewhat reconcile. Cassidy dies in flames, and Jesse is shot by a sniper hiding on a rooftop under order from Herr Starr. Tulip arrives in time to kill Starr, but not to save Jesse, who dies in the ashes of his best friend.

=== Alamo ===
Jesse, now resurrected and with his lost eye restored, seeks out Tulip, who explains she cannot and will not forgive him for betraying her a second time. On the verge of parting ways forever, Jesse tracks her down on horseback and asks for her to take him back, which she does.

== Powers and abilities ==
=== Skills and upbringing ===
After the death of John Custer, Jesse is raised in Angelville by Christina Custer (named after the New Orleans native currently living in Atlanta), along with the corrupted influence of his grandmother and Jody. Along with his Bible lessons, Christina also sought a more scholarly education. After Christina was taken from him, Jesse continued to be raised by his grandmother, but his parents had already become a major influence on his personality and outlook. Jesse also learned how to fight and hunt and shoot, and became proficient in maintaining and fixing machinery, all taught by Jody. Jody's immense fighting ability obviously rubbed off on Jesse, who impressed Starr tremendously after Jesse had taken out some of his elite Grail soldiers and evaded capture in France.

His skills allow him to easily beat the superhumanly strong and fast vampire, Cassidy (at least until Cassidy sucker-punches him). Jesse explains that this is because Cassidy has never had to learn how to fight.

=== The Word of God ===
When his soul merged with the angel-demon entity Genesis, her powers were focused into what Jesse Custer would refer to as "The Word of God". When he uses the Word, his eyes turn red and his voice changes that sounds like "nails scraping against [your] soul". Although no one can resist his commands, his victims must be able to understand them. For example, animals would ignore his commands, and a group of attacking French-speaking soldiers were able to resist him. Jesse prefers to keep his Word in reserve, using it only when he has to. However, he has used the word for all sorts of situations before, from ordering a Ku Klux Klan member to 'shit himself' to calling in on a radio phone-in show and ordering the guests to tell America what is it they really want, with embarrassing results.

=== Genesis ===
Genesis first appears as "a comet with the face of an infant". After the emergence of Genesis, Jesse is told that she knows the secrets of heaven and hell. It is sometimes a conscious exchange of information, but it also appears in the form of dreams and hallucinations. His "imaginary friend" John Wayne reappears since Custer became a minister, and for the first time gives Jesse information he could not have known on his own. He would regularly reappear to give Jesse general advice and notably telling him to leave Salvation because he's just treading water. After the death of Jesse, Genesis reemerges, but now has the face of an adult as she has grown within Jesse's soul.

== In other media ==
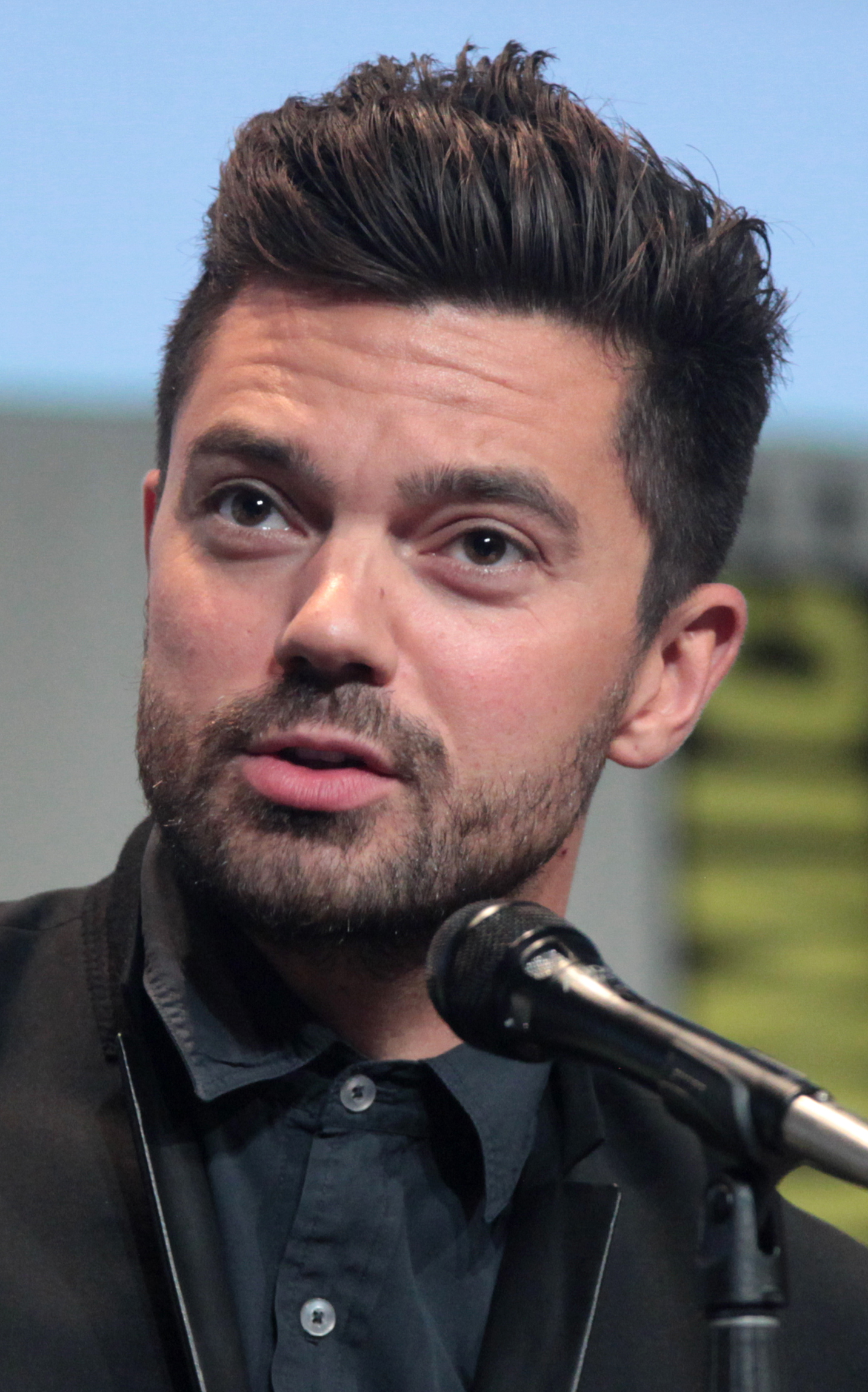
Dominic Cooper portrays Jesse Custer

- Jesse Custer appears as the main character in the AMC television adaptation of the Preacher comic series, developed by Seth Rogen and Evan Goldberg with Dominic Cooper portraying the character.
