= List of Preacher characters =

The following is a list of characters from the comic book series Preacher, created by Garth Ennis and Steve Dillon, and the adaptation developed by Sam Catlin, Evan Goldberg, and Seth Rogen.

== Overview ==
The following actors have been credited in the opening titles of the television series adaptation of Preacher.

Character	Actor	Seasons			
Character	Actor	1	2	3	4
Jesse Custer	Dominic Cooper	Main	Main	Main	Main
Proinsias Cassidy	Joseph Gilgun	Main	Main	Main	Main
Tulip O'Hare	Ruth Negga	Main	Main	Main	Main
Emily Woodrow	Lucy Griffiths	Main			
Sheriff Hugo Root	W. Earl Brown	Main	Guest		
Donnie Schenck	Derek Wilson	Main			
Eugene "Arseface" Root	Ian Colletti	Main	Main	Main	Main
Fiore	Tom Brooke	Main	Guest		Guest
DeBlanc	Anatol Yusef	Main			
William "The Saint of Killers" Munny	Graham McTavish	Main	Main	Main	Main
Herr Klaus Helmut Starr	Pip Torrens	Stand-in	Main	Main	Main
Adolf Hitler	Noah Taylor		Main	Main	Main
Lara Featherstone	Julie Ann Emery		Main	Main	Main
Hoover	Malcolm Barrett		Recurring	Main	
T.C.	Colin Cunningham	Stand-in	Stand-in	Main	
Marie "Gran'ma" L'Angelle	Betty Buckley		Guest (Note: In the second season finale, L'Angelle is portrayed by guest actress Julie Oliver-Touchstone.)	Main	
God Almighty	Mark Harelik		Guest (Note: In the second season, God is portrayed by Mike Howard in a guest capacity, in the guise of "Man-Dog".)	Recurring	Main
Himself	Mark Harelik	Guest (Note: In the first two seasons, guest actor Harelik portrays a fictionalised version of himself hired to portray God.)	Guest		
Humperdoo / The Messiah	Tyson Ritter		Guest	Recurring	Main
Jesus Christ	Tyson Ritter		Guest		Main

== Main characters ==
=== Jesse Custer ===
Jesse uses the Word of God

Jesse Custer, also known as Jesse L'Angelle, is a small-town church pastor who becomes fused with a powerful entity named Genesis, giving him the ability to cause people to obey whatever he commands. Using this power, he begins a journey of discovery and revenge across America, with the aim of forcing God to answer to his creation for his sins. Standing in Custer's way is a secret religious military organization mysteriously known as The Grail, as well as Custer's own twisted family.

When his soul becomes merged with the angel-demon entity Genesis, its powers, the sum of which are greater than God's, are focused into what Jesse Custer refers to as "The Word of God." When he uses The Word, his eyes turn red and his voice sounds like "nails scraping against [your] soul." Although very few can resist his commands, his victims must be able to understand them, meaning that those who do not speak English cannot be commanded by him. The Word is also initially ineffective against Jody and TC, as God has allied himself with the L'Angelle clan. Partway through the story arc, in an attempt to appease Jesse, God removes his blessing from the clan, making The Word once more effective. Custer prefers to keep his Word in reserve, using it only when necessary. He is an incredibly able hand-to-hand combatant thanks to years of brutal training forced upon him by Jody, the same man who murdered Custer's father in front of him when he was only 6 years old (as he mentions in The Alamo: "Being taught how to fight by the man who killed your daddy in front of you sure does tend to focus your concentration"). As a result, Custer is able to defend himself against multiple attackers at once and even against the superhuman strength of the vampire Cassidy. He uses the Word for all sorts of situations, from ordering a Ku Klux Klan member to 'shit himself' to calling in on a radio phone-in show and ordering the guests to tell America what they really want. In spite of his abusive upbringing, Custer firmly believes in concepts like justice and chivalry and does not hesitate to physically punish those who unfairly victimize innocent people.

In the AMC Preacher television series, Jesse Custer is portrayed by Dominic Cooper.

=== Tulip O'Hare ===
Tulip O'Hare is Jesse Custer's romantic interest, and a trained marksman of exceptional skill, also being three years Jesse's elder. Her mother died during childbirth, and she was raised much like a son by her father, Jake O'Hare, who introduced her to firearms, hunting, fishing, and war stories. When Jake dies in a hunting accident, Tulip grows to hate guns. Tulip is sent to a boarding school, where she befriends the wealthy Amy Grinderbinder. The two remain friends through college and drop out together after Amy gains a large inheritance. Tulip meets Jesse while waiting for Amy at a bar. The two embark on a whirlwind romance funded by petty crime, and Tulip falls deeply in love with him, only to be devastated when he abruptly disappears.

Alone and deeply depressed, Tulip turns to drugs and alcohol, which takes such a toll on her health that she realizes she must get sober or die. Unable to afford rehab, she begs a loan from a local crime boss with the promise that she will work for him to repay her debt once she's clean. Unfortunately, the only job he has is for a hit-woman. Her first hit goes horribly wrong, and in her attempt to flee, she tries to carjack a truck being driven by Cassidy, who good-naturedly offers her a lift instead. As they are traveling through Texas, Tulip witnesses the fireball that destroys the Annville church, and she and Cassidy rescue Jesse from the wreckage.

Tulip is slow to forgive Jesse until the two of them are captured by Jesse's grandmother, Marie. While they are held hostage, Jesse explains that he never abandoned Tulip, but was kidnapped by his grandmother's henchmen, who threatened to murder Tulip if he resisted. Seconds after Tulip forgives Jesse, she is killed under Marie's orders. God soon revives her to warn Jesse that more misfortune awaits him if he continues with his quest. After killing a wounded T.C. and leaving Marie to die, Tulip and Jesse are reunited.

Jesse goes to rescue Cassidy from the Grail but takes the precaution of abandoning Tulip in a hotel room so that she will not follow him. She is furious at his lack of trust, and devastated when she believes him to be dead. Cassidy, who has always been attracted to Tulip, lies to her when she asks him for Jesse's final words. Taking advantage of her depression, Cassidy begins to supply Tulip with drugs and alcohol, weakening her resistance until she finally agrees to sleep with him, then keeping her intoxicated so that she will continue to do so. After months of this, Tulip has a moment of clarity and shoots Cassidy through the chest, driving him out a window into daylight where he bursts into flame. She reconnects with Amy, who nurses her back to health. When Tulip recovers from her ordeal, the two women road trip to New York, where Tulip learns that Jesse is alive and trying to find her. She reconciles with Jesse once more.

Jesse makes his final plan to rid himself of Genesis, to destroy Starr, and to kill God, which involves a bargain with the Saint of Killers. Still afraid that Tulip would be hurt or killed in the ensuing fight, Jesse drugs her and leaves a note explaining that he only wants her to be safe. When Tulip regains consciousness, she is enraged that Jesse has again abandoned her and follows him to the Alamo where she kills Starr during a gun battle, only after Jesse has been murdered by Starr. Later, a newly resurrected Jesse (because of an earlier deal made between Cassidy and God) tries to console Tulip over his decision to once again abandon her, but her feelings of anger and betrayal lead her to dump him after she chides his lack of trust for her. While stuck in traffic on her way to New York, she finds a letter of confession from Cassidy admitting that Jesse's last words (when he was believed to be dead) had been for her. As she reads, Jesse approaches on a (stolen) police horse and begs her to take him back. Tulip at first refuses, but has a change of heart when she sees tears in Jesse's eyes; the first time he has cried since his father was murdered. Tulip joins Jesse and the two ride into the sunset contemplating their future together.

In the AMC Preacher television series, Tulip is portrayed by Ethiopian-Irish actress Ruth Negga. In the series, her full name is revealed to be Priscilla-Jean Henrietta O'Hare and her backstory is altered with her growing up with Jesse in Annville until she is sent to foster care.

=== Cassidy ===
Proinsias Cassidy
- Preacher and The Boys character
- Proinsias Cassidy, as portrayed by Joe Gilgun in the 2016–2019 AMC television series Preacher.
- First appearance: Comic book series: Preacher #1 (April 10, 1995); Television series: "Pilot"; Preacher Season 1×1; (May 22, 2016)
- Last appearance: Comic book series: The Boys #27 (February 4, 2009); Television series: "End of the World"; Preacher Season 4×10; (September 29, 2019)
- Created by: Garth Ennis; Steve Dillon
- Adapted by: Sam Catlin; Seth Rogen; Evan Goldberg
- Portrayed by: Joe Gilgun (Preacher)
- Voiced by: Michael John Casey (The Boys)

In-universe information
- Full name: Proinsias Cassidy
- Nicknames: Proinsias; Cassidy
- Species: Human; Vampire (formerly)
- Gender: Male
- Occupation: Bartender; Easter Rising Freedom fighter (formerly)
- Affiliation: Irish Volunteers (formerly)
- Weapon: Axe (The Boys)
- Family: William "Billy" Cassidy (brother)
- Significant others: Tulip O'Hare; Eccarius (formerly; season three)
- Children: Denis (son)
- Nationality: Irish
- Sponsor: Billy Butcher
- Abilities: Superhuman strength, speed, stamina, durability, endurance, smell, and hearing; Blood-Draining; Poison and Toxin Immunity; Regenerative Healing Factor; Immortality; Axe-Wielding; Television series: Hypnosis; Animal Transformation; Flight
- Weaknesses: Deathly Allergic to Sunlight

Cassidy, whose full name is Proinsias Cassidy, is an Irish vampire. Cassidy joins the Irish Volunteers and takes part in the Easter Rising in 1916, though his brother William (Billy) also joins to keep watch over him. Billy eventually forces Cassidy to desert the army because of its impending failure, and Cassidy is soon bitten by a "hag", who seemingly leaves fatal injuries. His body falls into the water, and he soon learns that he is not succumbing to the injuries and that the sun burns his skin. He begins to wear sunglasses to hide his eyes, which are now blood red as part of his transformation into a vampire. He decides to travel to the United States so his family and other soldiers will believe that he is dead. He lives in the United States, picking up alcohol and drug problems and even going as far as to prostitute himself for drugs.

All of the preceding is revealed to Jesse atop the Empire State Building in New York City. What he leaves out is that his addictions make him parasitical and irresponsible (In a way, making him a figurative vampire as well as a literal one), causing harm and death to those around him when he abandons them to circumstances he set in motion. Repeatedly showing a remarkable lack of forethought, many women he hooks up with and lives off of over the years end up critically injured, hopelessly addicted to drugs, or dead. After he gets the girlfriend of a friend of his killed during the "Dixie Fried" story arc, Xavier, who is a Voodoo priest says "I honestly don't believe he's an evil man. Just careless. And thoughtless. And terribly, terribly weak."

He eventually meets Tulip O'Hare and Jesse Custer while hitchhiking to Dallas, intending to start a bar called "The Grassy Knoll". Cassidy forms a strong friendship with Jesse and eventually falls in love with Tulip, though she does not reciprocate the feelings. He constantly struggles with his addictions and his feelings for Tulip, though after believing Jesse to be dead, both he and Tulip take up heavy drugs and alcohol, and start a sexual relationship. After reuniting with Jesse, he is told that Jesse no longer wants anything to do with him after finding about his history, though the two agree to meet one more time. They engage in a fist fight that Jesse's skill easily allows him to dominate, while constantly berating Cassidy. When Cassidy finally accepts his failures and begins, as Jesse puts it, "acting like a man," Jesse takes Cassidy's hand in forgiveness. Cassidy proves he's worth the gesture by walking into the sunrise to atone for all he has done, burning up in the process.

Once Jesse is gunned down by the Grail, it is revealed that Cassidy has made a deal with God hours before his confrontation with Jesse; he would beat Jesse to the point of surrender and allow Genesis to be destroyed. In return, God must allow both Jesse and Cassidy to live. Despite events not quite going to plan, God keeps His word. Jesse is revived and goes looking for Tulip, while Cassidy watches his first sunset in years as a human being, then drives off with a pledge to act like a man.

An older now-human Cassidy returns in the fourth volume of Garth Ennis' subsequent DC Comics (WildStorm)/Dynamite Entertainment series The Boys – "We Gotta Go Now" – in a guest role. Having finally opened his "The Grassy Knoll" Irish pub bar, and grown a ponytail, Cassidy wears a t-shirt with "careful now" (in reference to Father Ted) inscribed on it. After ejecting a group of drunk Irish-Americans dressed as Irish stereotypes from his bar on St. Patrick's Day by throwing an axe at the wall behind them, Cassidy returns to his ongoing conversation with his British friend Billy Butcher (with whom he is on a first-name-basis) about both being recovering alcoholics, and reminiscing about times in the past when they would have gone out drinking and acted like as "Stage Irishman", before both drink club sodas, toasting to taking it "one day at a time". After hearing that Cassidy can write "fuck off" in the head of a pint of Guinness, arriving Scotsman "Wee Hughie" Campbell (Billy's protégé in the Boys) orders such a drink before the two begin discussing Hughie's G-Men mission and the Seven before leaving, as Cassidy silently closes up the bar.

While a vampire Cassidy has superhuman strength and speed that can easily rip regular humans apart, though he has no formal training, allowing Jesse to easily beat him without taking any injuries (except for a broken breastbone which occurred when Cassidy offered his hand in friendship and then sucker punched Jesse). Cassidy can survive any physical wound although he feels the full pain associated with the injury. He can heal superhumanly fast, and drinking blood allows him to accelerate the process. The only thing that can kill him is being directly in sunlight for a period of time, though he can stand indirect exposure with discomfort. Although Cassidy needs blood to sustain himself, he does not need human or even fresh blood, preferring instead the taste of beer or whiskey. He generally drinks blood from live humans only if they threaten him.

The character of Cassidy has been analyzed as a stereotypical depiction of a European in fiction.

In the AMC Preacher television series, Cassidy is portrayed by Joe Gilgun. Unlike the comics, he usually appears without his trademark sunglasses.

=== The Saint of Killers ===
The Saint of Killers is the Patron Saint of Murderers and Assassination. He was originally a soldier serving in the Confederate Army during the American Civil War; both respected and feared for being absolutely merciless on the battlefield, his bloodlust verging on that of a berserker frenzy. After the war, he makes his living in the American West by collecting Native scalps and bounty hunting, until he rescues a young woman. She manages to break through to his gentler side, and the two fall in love and have a daughter. When his wife and child fall ill, he attempts to fetch medicine for them, but is delayed by a blizzard and gang of outlaws, which results in his family's death. He subsequently slaughters much of the gang and kills an innocent hostage, but runs out of bullets before killing the leader, which leads to his death after being impaled in the chest with a shovel.

Death takes him, and, because of the innocent life he took, he is consigned to perdition. His own hatred and indignation over the injustice of his death and that of his family causes Hell to literally freeze over (much to the Devil's wrath), which causes the Angel of Death to offer him to return to Earth under the condition that he takes up his role of collecting the souls of those who die by violence. Melting the Angel of Death's sword in Hell's last burning fire, the Devil forges two Walker Colt revolvers that will kill anything, never miss their target, never leave his possession, and never run out of bullets. The now resigned Angel of Death dubs the man "The Saint of Killers". However, the Devil makes the fatal mistake of insulting Saint as he returns to Earth, prompting the angry Saint to gun the Devil down as his first victim, leaving the fate of Hell unknown. Following the Devil's demise, the Saint kills the rest of the bandits and purges the town of Ratwater simply because of his nature, and rests at a tomb on Boot Hill while his spirit gathers souls that die by violence. He is awakened once Genesis merges with Custer, and begins to pursue him. He eventually learns that he has no one commanding him, God having left Heaven, though he continues to hunt Custer because he was scorned. He spares Custer after he learns that God arranged for his family to die in order to set him on the path towards becoming the Saint, and now seeks to kill God. The two finally join forces, and after Custer lets himself be killed to release Genesis, God returns to Heaven, where the Saint has slaughtered all of the angels. Despite God's attempts to intimidate the Saint with His wrath and then offering to restore his family to life, the Saint guns Him down, ending His tyranny. With no one left to kill anymore, the Saint sits upon God's Throne and returns to sleep as the world is bathed in peace.

The Saint of Killers subsequently makes a cameo appearance in Garth Ennis' DC Comics series Hitman.

In the AMC Preacher television series, the character is portrayed by Graham McTavish. Simply referred to as The Cowboy in the first season, the character's real name is revealed to be William Munny in the second season episode "On Your Knees", after Clint Eastwood's character from Unforgiven, who was initially cited by Garth Ennis (along with fellow actor Lee Marvin) as his principle inspiration for the Saint's design in the comic series.

==== Powers ====
- Invulnerability: The Saint of Killers is impervious to harm - being hit with a nuclear missile caused no damage to him or his clothes, apart from the comment "Not enough gun". He can easily knock away tanks with a simple kick and he can be hit by a speeding truck without flinching.
- Supernatural Precision: He can draw his guns supernaturally quickly, and always hits his mark, even piercing tank armor to reach the intended target.
- Omnideadliness: The weapons always inflict fatal injuries regardless of the circumstance or nature of the victim (including angels and demons) - even God and the Devil are not immune to the bullets, as the Saint has killed them both (the only being ever to have survived being shot by the Saint was Cassidy, but Garth Ennis later admitted that he was still working out the character of the Saint at that point and was a technical mistake).
- Ghost Perception: Anyone holding one of the guns can see the spirits of the many people that the Saint has personally killed.

In 2009, the Saint of Killers was ranked as IGN's 74th Greatest Comic Book Villain of All Time.

=== Herr Starr ===
Herr Starr (his first name is never revealed; in the television series, his name is given as Klaus Helmut Starr) was a former German anti-terror operative and member of The Grail. During his school years, a group of five bullies targeted him because he was the son of a British serviceman. This eventually led to an attack in which the boys gave "a star for Starr" by using a broken bottle to carve five jagged lines around his right eye, which was then blinded. The stress of the event caused his hair to fall out and his voice to become harsh and grating, due to his screaming during the incident. He eventually became dedicated to creating order in the world, and started by killing his attackers - who all died before Starr turned ten. He later joined the German anti-terrorism unit GSG 9, and excelled in all training areas. He showed initiative crucial to his future employment when he defeated his close-combat tutor (a sadist who enjoyed beating up new recruits) by shooting him in the legs at the start of a training session. As a result, he was not as skilled in unarmed combat as other Grail operatives, although his explanation for this was that he had "no intention of ever being unarmed".

Starr was recruited by the Grail and quickly rose to the rank of 'Sacred Executioner', the leader of the Grail's private military known as the "Samson Unit". As such he was answerable only to the Grail's formal leader, "Allfather" D'Aronique, and ultimately to the Elite Council at Le Saint Marie (which was the power behind the throne). From 1982 onward, he trained every Samson man in the Grail. Starr eventually decided that the Grail's motives were flawed because they planned everything around their horribly inbred Messiah. He recruited two Grail subordinates, Featherstone and Hoover, to assist him with his "conspiracy-within-a-conspiracy".

When he learns of Jesse Custer and his power of "the Word", Starr concludes that he is the perfect candidate for an alternative Messiah and planned to use Custer in his scheme to overthrow the Grail's leadership. Although Custer refuses to participate in the plot, Starr proceeds with his coup regardless. Starr destroys the Grail's heavily fortified headquarters 'Masada', wiping out roughly 90% of the Grail's "Samson" unit (military personnel), and killing many of its key figures, including Allfather D'Aronique as well as the gruesomely inbred pair of sibling descendants of Jesus. Afterward, the bulk of the Grail's Samson forces die during Starr's mission to kill Jesse Custer in Monument Valley, Utah, when a nuclear bomb detonates in a futile attempt to kill the invulnerable Saint of Killers.

Having murdered his way to the position of Allfather, Starr further consolidates his control by defeating the previous Sacred Executioner Eisenstein, the last genuine threat from within the organization. In a final move, he persuades his most loyal subordinate in the Samson force, Captain Gander, that the Elite Council of the Grail is responsible for his own failures; Gander gasses the seven men of the Council in their gathering place at Le Saint Marie with chlorine, leaving Starr in uncontested control. However, his vendetta against Custer has left him scarred and dismembered, and his continued waste of Grail resources leaves the organization reduced to an ineffective fragment of its former self. Starr, along with Captain Gander and the last remaining members of the Grail loyal to him, are killed by Tulip O'Hare.

Herr Starr is characterized as extremely ruthless and determined, as evidenced by his backstory and relentless pursuit of his goals, whatever they may be. He is also a sexual pervert, finding pleasure in things like urinating in prostitute's mouths, forcing them to stick their heads in toilets as he's ejaculating and having a sawfish inserted in his rectum. It is implied that these habits become more and more perverted over the course of the story as a result of him getting raped. As the story progresses he slowly descends deeper into both rage and insanity (even shooting a report by agent Hoover due to the incorrect use of grammar and quotation marks) and he perverts the Grail's private army into a personal task force charged with killing Custer, who he sees as the cause of all his ills.

Throughout the course of the series, Starr sustains various humiliating injuries showing the extent of his determination towards his goal of global domination. He is raped by a male prostitute, has his left ear shot off by Tulip, and Jesse cuts a gash across his head, making it resemble a penis (he spends the rest of the series hiding the scar with a Panama hat). He is captured by three inbred hillbillies who eat his right leg before he kills them and escapes. He fears he has met his match in the Grail agent Eisenstein, but successfully kills him, his cannibal bodyguard, and the bodyguard's dog, although not before it chews off his genitalia. Throughout all these injuries, his only comment after they have occurred is always "Ah... Shit.", including his last words after being shot by Tulip during the Custer/Cassidy fight.

The character of Herr Starr has been analyzed as a stereotypical depiction of a villainous European in fiction. In 2009, Herr Starr was ranked as IGN's 66th Greatest Comic Book Villain of All Time.

In the AMC Preacher television series, Herr Starr (credited as Man In White Suit) makes a cameo on the third episode, being portrayed by Morse Bicknell. Starr officially debuts in season 2, being portrayed by Pip Torrens.

=== God ===
God Almighty is the ancient creator of the universe as well as the king of Heaven. He created man out of loneliness and a desire to be loved as He was all alone in the universe. God was prideful, demanding worship from the humans and cruelly punishing those who defied Him. He was also narcissistic, believing that His nature and ways should not have been known by man and that He was beyond retribution or accountability for His actions. He left Heaven and fled to Earth after Genesis was born, not to be heard from again until Genesis in turn leaves Heaven for Earth and fuses with Jesse Custer. After Jesse (and Genesis) were slain, God felt safe to return to Heaven, only to find that the Saint of Killers was waiting for Him and had slain the entire Heavenly Host. God tried to intimidate the Saint with His wrath, but was stopped when the Saint held Him at gunpoint. He begged the Saint of Killers not to kill Him, and attempted to bargain with the Saint by telling him that He would restore his family if he let Him sit upon His throne once more, but the Saint of Killers chose "to rest" instead and fired, killing God. He then took his rest upon God's empty throne.

God is portrayed by Mark Harelik in AMC'S Preacher television series, and by Mike Howard in his Man-Dog form. Harelik had previously appeared as a fictionalized version of himself hired to impersonate the deity.

=== Arseface ===
Arseface is a boy who, having grown up in an abusive household, attempts to kill himself after trying to emulate his hero, Kurt Cobain. He starred in his own one-shot spinoff comic book, Preacher: The Story of You-Know-Who. His father is abusive and often beats him for trivial reasons. Arseface and his friend "Pube" are regarded as outcasts because of their idol worship of Kurt Cobain, and because Arseface is a sheriff's son; thus the two become the target of bullying tactics. After a severe beating by his father, and learning of Cobain's suicide, Arseface makes a suicide pact with Pube. Pube puts a shotgun in his mouth and kills himself, while Arseface fires the shotgun under his chin, which severely deforms his face instead. After being confronted in the hospital by Pube's grief-stricken sister, the boy has an epiphany and resolves to change his outlook on life and try to be more positive. His suicide attempt prompts his long-suffering mother to have her own epiphany and abandon her abusive husband, leaving him an insulting goodbye note in which she reveals her disdain for not only him, but their son as well. This causes the boy's father to begin completely ignoring his son, refusing to acknowledge him or speak to him. The boy, maintaining his new upbeat attitude, continues to enthusiastically converse with his father despite never getting a reply.

During his father's investigation in the Jesse Custer case, the boy stows away in his father's car. During a confrontation with Jesse and the Saint of Killers, the boy pleads for the Saint to let his father live. Cassidy remarks that the boy's face looked like an "arse." After Jesse forces the boy's father, Hugo, to sodomize himself with his own severed penis, Hugo commits suicide, which leads the boy to name himself Arseface and begin a manhunt for Jesse. Arseface eventually tracks down Jesse outside of a diner, where Jesse uses his abilities to force Arseface to acknowledge his father's true nature. He travels with Jesse until he is called on stage during Mardi Gras because of his looks, and ends up becoming a singing hit (despite being unintelligible). Under the guidance of his manager, Gene Sergeant, Arseface becomes a national singing superstar, and Sergeant uses various controversies, such as drawing attention to copycat suicides by fans attempting to emulate their idol, and insulting the Pope, to keep him popular. At the height of the controversies, Sergeant takes all of his money and leaves.

Arseface, now broke and widely loathed, travels the country once again. His travels eventually lead him to the town of Salvation, Texas, where he encounters people bullying Lorie Bobbs. He drives off her tormentors, and the two fall in love due to Lorie's visual disorder causing her to see Arseface as incredibly handsome. When Lorie asks why he would have any interest in her, he remarks 'beggars can't be choosers.' The two stay in Salvation, and Arseface lands a job shoveling manure. He also befriends Custer's one-armed mother, who has a maternal interest in Lorie.

In the AMC Preacher television series, Arseface is portrayed by Ian Colletti. In the show, his full name is revealed as Eugene Edward Root and his backstory is heavily altered. Eugene had a good relationship with his parents and lived a fairly normal life until his disfigurement. A flashback in Season 2 reveals that Eugene had tried to talk a girl out of committing suicide with a shotgun after she caught her boyfriend cheating on her. He nearly succeeded until he accidentally kissed her during a tender moment. When she realized that Eugene had feelings for her, she simply said "ew" and killed herself anyway. Mortified, Eugene tried to kill himself with the same shotgun, but it did not go off right away. He looked down at the barrel to see what the problem was and the round fired into his mouth, horribly disfiguring his face. Afterwards, the townsfolk made him and his family outcasts, believing he had intentionally caused the girl's death before trying to kill himself. Eugene's father lost most of the people's respect and his mother was so traumatized by the events that she went into a catatonic state. After Jesse discovered his powers, he forced the girl's family to forgive Eugene and he became accepted by society again. However, feeling that he does not deserve forgiveness for what happened, Eugene confronted Jesse and demanded he take it back. Losing his patience, Jesse shouted "go to hell, Eugene", accidentally sending Eugene to Hell. He is imprisoned by demons along with other sinners, where he meets Adolf Hitler. They eventually both escape Hell and make it back to Earth. After learning that Annville was destroyed and his parents died with it, Eugene was eventually captured by the Saint of Killers and reluctantly helped him in his hunt for Jesse. When he confronted Jesse, he shot the preacher in the back after he was dissatisfied with Jesse's heartfelt apology for everything that happened. Eugene was then arrested by the police, but was eventually released and began a new career as a street singer.

== Secondary characters ==
=== Skeeter ===
Skeeter is a dog. Jesse Custer met Skeeter at a gas station on his way to track down his girlfriend, Tulip. Skeeter tried to "play" with a visiting police officer, and got a kick for his troubles. When Custer confronted the officer, he ended up punching the man right through the windshield of his patrol car. Skeeter and Custer were inseparable after that, and took a long journey around the country together. Skeeter was an intelligent dog, and helped save Custer's life several times. He also took to Custer's friends, making him a very well-liked part of the group.

=== Angels ===
Angels have limited interaction with humans in the series, but their universal trait seems to be a remarkable ineffectiveness. God created the angels to serve Him and to act as His emissaries on Earth.

In 1994, the Seraphi angel that fathered Genesis falls to Earth for the sin of having sex with a demon and is captured by the Grail. It is later revealed that God controlled them both in order to create Genesis. Used by Starr and the Allfather, he provides them with intelligence about Heaven and God. He reveals the true origin of Genesis to Jesse, and is killed by God shortly thereafter.

Two Adelphi angels are Fiore and DeBlanc, who are sent to Earth to retrieve Genesis. They first meet Jesse Custer during his confrontation with Hugo Root and the Saint of Killers and are forced by him to reveal that God has abdicated His throne, beginning Jesse's quest to find the Almighty. They show up in the final arc, having fallen so far that Fiore is snorting cocaine and DeBlanc is having sex with a woman. Jesse storms into their casino and asks for information regarding Genesis and the fall, which they provide.

In the AMC Preacher television series, Fiore and DeBlanc are portrayed respectively by Tom Brooke and Anatol Yusef.

=== Billy Bob and Lorie Bobbs ===
Billy Bob Bobbs is Jesse Custer's childhood friend during his time spent on the L'Angelle estate. Billy Bob comes from a poor, severely inbred family living in the swamp, and expects to follow the family tradition of marrying his sister. Both Billy Bob and Lorie share a deformity, a bare patch of skin where the left eye should be located. When Billy Bob happens upon T.C. raping a chicken in the barn, T.C. murders him by slitting his throat. Jesse attacks T.C. and calls him a cocksucker, which results in his grandmother sentencing him to be trapped in a coffin under the lake. When Jesse is released and goes to the Bobbs home to tell them about Billy Bob's death and apologize, they angrily reject him.

Lorie Bobbs, Billy Bob's sister, finds her way to the town of Salvation, where she works in the town bar. Her inbreeding also results in a visual condition where she sometimes sees one object as something else, although this does not seem to affect her life negatively. When Arseface arrives in the town, he protects her from an attack by visiting drunken rednecks. She eventually falls in love with Arseface, who appears to be very attractive because of her visual delusions coupled with the fact that he saved her from a pack of thugs.

=== Paul Bridges and John Tool ===
John Tool is a police detective in New York City who refers to himself as "the unluckiest cop in the world." He suffers from self-doubt and uncertainty, which seems to be justified various times by the unfortunate events of his life; he runs out of bullets in a gunfight, drives through an intersection and ruins his car, spills coffee on his new suit, and is unable to track a call from the serial killer he is trying to apprehend because he forgot to connect his phone to a recording device. His luck changes when he investigates the Reaver-Cleaver case, as it is he who discovers the killer's hideout. Tool is given credit for the killer's capture and death, although Jesse was the one who actually caused his death by using his power, saying the word "die", while punching the killer in the face. His poor luck returns, as it is mentioned in an afterword that he later loses both arms in a window glazing accident.

Paul Bridges is John Tool's partner, and unlike Tool, is seen as a "supercop." He is brutally harsh towards criminals, and makes various homophobic remarks throughout his appearance in the series. It is later revealed that Bridges himself is homosexual, and enjoys feeling pain as well as dishing it out; this is best seen when Jesse walks in on him getting whipped while handcuffed to a table dressed in leather. After Tool discovers his secret lifestyle, Bridges quits the police force. After he leaves the force, it seems that Bridges dove headfirst into his sadomasochistic fantasies and is last seen cold calling Tool from a sex dungeon while dressed in a gimp suit.

=== The Chunt Brothers ===
Karl, Ernie, and Cyrus Chunt are a trio of sibling cannibals who find Starr after his helicopter crashes in the desert following the battle in Monument Valley. Karl and Ernie cook and eat people they find; when Starr regains consciousness, they have already eaten his leg. Cyrus is mentally handicapped and unable to communicate, but asks Starr to wipe his anus after defecating through actions and the word "wub." Starr uses this moment as an opportunity to steal Cyrus' gun and use it to kill the trio.

=== Si Coltrane ===
Si Coltrane is a friend of Cassidy whom he met at Woodstock at the age of sixteen. He works in New York City as a freelance journalist, and is investigating the Reaver-Cleaver case, getting information from Tool and Bridges for his reports. It is later revealed that Coltrane himself is the Reaver-Cleaver, who first became a murderer after accidentally running over someone; His guilt was soon replaced by laughter as he believed it was fun to kill people and get away with it. He attempts to have Cassidy killed in his apartment when he gives his hideout's location to the police, frame Jesse for his crimes, kill Tulip, and give himself part of the credit for solving his own murders. He is killed when Jesse uses the word and orders him to die, although it appears that Jesse kills him simply by punching him in the face.

=== Christina Custer ===
Christina Custer is Jesse Custer's mother. She meets John Custer, a Marine recently returned from Vietnam, as an anti-war protester. She spits in his face, but later apologizes, leading to a relationship. They are forced to marry by Christina's mother and told never to leave under the threat of death. During an attempt to escape, John is shot to death by Jody, who works for the L'Angelle family. She later protests the punishment of Jesse, which leads to Marie ordering Jody to shoot her. She manages to escape, though her skull is cracked open by a reflexive shot and she loses her left arm to an alligator. She is rescued by hunters, though she is brain damaged, which leaves her in a persistent vegetative state for many years. She later recovers, though she has amnesia and believes her name is "Jodie". She makes her way back to Salvation, recovers her memories slowly, and eventually remembers everything after Jesse says "Mom".

Christina is portrayed by Liz McGeever in season 3 of the AMC Preacher television series.

=== John Custer ===
Very little is known of John Custer's life prior to the Vietnam War, other than that his father was a Marine who fought in the Pacific Theater during World War II, which inspired him to enlist. A United States Marine and veteran of the Vietnam War (his uniform indicates that he served in the 3rd Marine Division), John once received a silver Zippo lighter engraved with the words "Fuck Communism" during a morale-boosting visit from John Wayne, John Custer's personal hero; the incident is a very important moment in John Custer's life. While serving in combat, John saves the life of a fellow soldier, Billy "Spaceman" Baker, by carrying him over one hundred kilometers of enemy territory. In the process, Custer and Baker uncover and sabotage a company-strength Vietcong attack before both men are saved by a US airstrike. John's heroic actions result in him being awarded the Medal of Honor.

Upon returning to the States, John Custer meets young Christine L'Angelle, who was travelling with a group of anti-war protesters. When John asks for directions to a bus station, Christine spits in his face and calls him a "babykiller." John's gentle reaction so surprises her that she feels guilty and apologizes, accepting John's offer to go for coffee. The two fall in love and eventually have a child, Jesse. John Custer proves to be a loving father and husband who adores his young son, taking the child to John Wayne movies and always encouraging him to be one of the "good guys." Years later, Christine is tracked down by Jody and T.C., her mother's hired thugs; the men are under orders to kill anyone who is with Christine, but realize the situation has changed once they learn John is the father of Christine's child. Instead, the family is dragged back to Angelville, where John and Christine are forced to marry. After years under Marie L'Angelle's tyrannical hand, John realizes he must help his family escape. They are caught in the attempt, and John is murdered before his young son's eyes.

In the AMC Preacher television series, John Custer is portrayed by Nathan Darrow in season 1. Unlike the comics, he was a preacher himself in the same church as Jesse, in Annville.

=== Deputy Cindy Daggett ===
Cindy Daggett is the official deputy of the town of Salvation, an African-American woman who becomes Jesse's aide-de-camp as well as retaining her Deputy role when he becomes sheriff. Initially dubious of his abilities and intentions, she starts to like him when he shows absolute fearlessness against the evil Odin Quincannon, especially when he uses a check by Quincannon to hire a secretary and buy her a powerful rifle. During his stay, she begins to fall in love with him, but realizes that he's in love with someone else. She becomes the new sheriff when he leaves.

=== Allfather D'Aronique ===
Allfather D'Aronique is the formal leader of the Grail organization, being the 112th to hold the title, and Jesse Custer's distant uncle. He is barely mobile because of his extreme weight, which requires him to be carried about by retainers. According to Starr, the Grail has to pay $60m per year repairing airplanes that suffer broken wheels landing due to D'Aronique's weight. D'Aronique is also bulimic, and uses an ivory stick in the shape of two fingers to induce vomiting. Because his subordinates are all too loyal or afraid of him to question anything he does, he has no compunction about messily gorging himself with food and then vomiting all over himself in front of others. Despite his seemingly hapless appearance, D'Aronique is both highly intelligent and absolutely ruthless, albeit very pious and fully believing in the cause of The Grail and the potential of the messiah. He requires multiple world leaders to call him daily and thank him for preserving their power. He is killed during a coup d'état of The Grail when he is pushed out his helicopter by Herr Starr. In Preacher #61, it is revealed that the Allfather of the Grail answers to an elite council of seven men in le Saint-Marie, who are the power behind the throne of the entire organization. Herr Starr has all seven of these men assassinated with chlorine gas.

D'Aronique is portrayed by Jonny Coyne in season 3 of the TV show adaptation.

=== Jesus DeSade ===
Jesus DeSade is a millionaire hedonist who believes in pursuing every sexual fantasy, no matter how perverted. He engages in activities such as drug dealing, zoophilia, and child pornography. DeSade is also known for throwing wildly hedonistic parties for Hollywood's elite, where literally no fetish or sexual perversion is left unpursued. Jesse and his friends crash one of the parties, initially amused by the kinky and perverse but largely harmless antics of DeSade's guests. Jesse discovers DeSade's intention to make a pornographic film involving a child, and after rescuing the boy Jesse beats DeSade savagely, telling him that he will be waiting when DeSade gets out of jail.

=== The Duke ===
"The Duke" is Jesse Custer's imaginary friend, appearing to him shortly after the death of his parents. The Duke appears to be based on John Wayne, possessing Wayne's speech pattern and mannerism, although his face is always in shadow when he appears; Custer tells Tulip that he has never believed that the Duke is the ghost of John Wayne as Wayne was still alive when Jesse first began to see the Duke. Young Jesse and his father used to enjoy watching Wayne's movies and these times are some of Jesse's most cherished memories of his father. John impressed upon his son that John Wayne was one of the "good guys" Jesse should always strive to be like. It is implied several times that the Duke may be the spirit of John Custer returning to guide his son.

When Jesse and his mother are trapped in Angelville, the Duke frequently appears to comfort Jesse, saving the young boy's sanity when Jesse is punished in the coffin. When Jesse's spirit finally breaks under the control of his grandmother, the Duke calls Jesse a coward and abandons him, returning only after Jesse finally rejects his grandmother's poisonous version of Christianity. At times, the Duke provides information that Jesse could not have known himself and acts as a deus ex machina in order to advance the plot line. The Duke appears one last time to Jesse just before he goes to confront Cassidy at the Alamo during the last book of the series; the Duke tells Jesse he is proud of him, then disappears.

While serving in Vietnam, Jesse's father John was personally given a Zippo lighter engraved with the words "Fuck Communism" by the real John Wayne. This lighter was stolen by Jody after killing John Custer, and Jesse retrieved it decades later when he killed Jody. Later Jesse meets a Vietnam vet with an identical lighter; this man served with Jesse's father and is able to tell stories of John Custer's time in Vietnam. The "Fuck Communism" lighter appears at several significant moments throughout the series.

=== Eccarius and Les Enfants du Sang ===
Eccarius is introduced in the one-shot "Blood and Whiskey", and he is a native of New Orleans and the only other vampire in the series. He meets Cassidy at some undisclosed time in the past. He styles himself after the more romantic gothic image of vampires, wearing frilly clothes and speaking in an erudite manner. He was drunk when he was bitten by the vampire who turned him, so he has no idea who it was. He has only been a vampire for ten years at the point of the story, and he shows a massive lack of genuine knowledge about vampires and their weaknesses - he does not realize that he can consume things other than blood, nor that sunlight is the only real weakness they have. He portrays himself as a vampire cliche, putting on all the affectations of fictionalized vampires, but not being terribly intelligent; when Cassidy calls him a "wanker", he initially thinks it is a corruption of "wampyr". The fact that Cassidy jokes about what Eccarius takes seriously is a constant source of tension.

In the basement of his mansion reside a group of "followers" revealed to be rich kids that are interested in vampires who treat Eccarius as something of a lord. Calling themselves 'Les Enfants du Sang', they drink the blood of willing members as a pastime and take an intense interest in Cassidy when it is revealed he is a vampire. Cassidy is disgusted, calling Eccarius a self-obsessed egotist and breaking the jaw of one follower. There appears to be an informal "inner circle", composed of members who want to be turned by Eccarius into vampires: Mako, Lili, and later Jonathan. Then there is a loose grouping of members just in it for the dressing up and drinking blood part. These are not terrifically intelligent, and are used as cannon fodder by higher echelon members. All the members show varying degrees of being disconnected with reality; when some of them try to kidnap Tulip years later, they act the part of vampires fully. They bring knives, she packs a gun. It does not end well for them.

Eccarius is killed by Cassidy during their first meeting after Eccarius has drained a follower of all her blood. Eccarius, truly, was aware of the naivete of Les Enfants du Sang. He reveals that he kills them under the pretense of turning them into vampires, but drains them completely of their blood instead. He brags that he had killed "hundreds". Cassidy knocks him out and crucifies him to the roof of a Church, exposing him to full sunlight and killing him. This causes the cult to take up a vendetta years later when Cassidy, Tulip, and Jesse come to New Orleans to request the aid of a Voodoo priest to find out more about Genesis. The cult is killed by Jesse and Tulip - Cassidy is beheaded early in the fight, but survives - and Jonathan is mortally wounded when Jesse shoves his katana sword into his anus, and Lili (suffering a gunshot wound inflicted by Tulip) falls onto the protruding katana blade. The fight results in the death of the priest's girlfriend and sets up a vendetta against Cassidy by the grief-stricken priest.

Eccarius is portrayed by Adam Croasdell in season 3 of the TV show adaptation. He is depicted as far more powerful than his comic book counterpart and demonstrates numerous vampiric abilities that Cassidy does not possess, including flight, hypnosis, and shapeshifting.

=== Genesis ===
The Genesis entity is the result of the mating of an angel and a demon. Genesis has the appearance of a comet with the face of a crying infant and possesses all of the memories and powers of heaven and hell. Immediately after Genesis' birth, God leaves heaven, leaving the Seraphi angels in command. Soon after, Genesis escapes and bonds to Custer, leading the Adelphi angels to appoint the Saint of Killers to retrieve Genesis and the vessel.

In the AMC Preacher television series, Genesis is shown to have merged and killed other religious leaders before its encounter with Jesse Custer. Among the killed was Tom Cruise (who is a prominent Scientologist).

=== Bob Glover and Freddy Allen, Sexual Investigators ===
First introduced in the issue entitled "Comes A Pale Rider," Bob Glover, an extremely aggressive homosexual, is a buzz-cut, heavyset man with a thick Yorkshire accent, while Freddy Allen is shorter, has a slighter build, glasses, and an unshaven countenance. He extremely dislikes giving fellatio, but seems to be put in situations where it is forced on him (he even has a trophy for it). Due to their sexual preoccupation as Sexual Investigators, they tend to work for disreputable clients.

Their first case involves retrieving a supply of heroin for a party hosted by Jesus DeSade. The heroin is hidden in the apartment of Cassidy's deceased addict girlfriend, thus compelling Cassidy to pursue them in order to learn the identity of her supplier. Meanwhile, Hoover of the Grail inadvertently hires Bob to sexually service Herr Starr, traumatizing Starr for much of the remainder of the series. Bob and Freddy retrieve the heroin and deliver it to DeSade, where Cassidy catches up to them, punches out all Freddy's teeth, and throws Bob from a window onto the roof of Jesse's car.

Much later in the series, the sexual investigators appear in pursuit of a fleeing porn actor named Tom Cooze. The two hitch a ride with Jesse, but as their paths never directly crossed on the night of the disastrous party, none of them recognize each other, although Jesse realises who they are some time after they have left his car.

=== Amy Grinderbinder ===
Amy Grinderbinder is the daughter of a wealthy family, an elementary school teacher and friend of Jesse and Tulip who lives in New York City. She first met Tulip when they both attended the same boarding school. While in school, Amy was almost gang-raped during a party; Tulip, witnessing the assault, stole a truck from the parking lot and crashed it through a wall into the room where Amy was trapped, scaring off the would-be rapists. The incident bonds the two into true friends, and Amy finally reveals the secret of her family's vast wealth (having previously been afraid that Tulip would otherwise only like her for her money). In the aftermath, Amy took a year off school to recover and invited Tulip to join her, leading to them meeting Jesse. Late in the series, it is revealed that Amy has spent the entire time following Jesse and Tulip, always arriving in the aftermath of one of their disastrous adventures. Eventually she comes to know them so well that she is able to predict their next move and sometimes secretly use her money and connections to make things easier for them.

Amy is portrayed as a "poor little rich girl" from a wealthy but extremely dysfunctional and negligent family. She is extremely worldly and sophisticated, but she admires Tulip's toughness and adventurous spirit, sometimes wishing that she could have accompanied Tulip and Jesse on their journey. A running motif with Amy is her multiple unlucky romantic experiences. She envies Tulip and Jesse's true love, even to the point of feeling a mild sexual attraction for Jesse — a feeling Jesse somewhat returns, though both of them love Tulip too much to act on their desires.

=== Holden ===
Colonel Holden is the commanding officer of a United States Military Base in Arizona which Starr utilizes against Jesse and the Saint of Killers in Monument Valley. Holden is distrustful of Starr, and prides himself on achieving only what he deserves rather than getting farther by flattering those above him. He is also seen to care very deeply for the lives of his men. Holden is killed by Featherstone when he tries to kill Starr for putting his men at risk.

It is later revealed that Holden served in Vietnam as a captain, and witnessed John Custer return Space to safety.

=== Hoover and Featherstone ===
These subordinates of Herr Starr first appear during the series' introduction of the Grail. Hoover is a soft-spoken, naive African-American who is squeamish around violence and cannot bring himself to swear (he is particularly shocked at Featherstone's frequent use of the word "motherfucker"), while Featherstone is a white, blond-haired, bespectacled young woman who is tough, practical, and loyal. Hoover was originally a lifeguard at a swimming pool. When a swimmer drowns on his watch, his guilt drove him to the belief that he wished to make the world a better, safer place, leading him to join the Grail. Sarah Featherstone ("Lara" is a pseudonym, just like "Jenny") is a former Sunday School teacher who previously had great faith in God's mercy and justice until her sister was raped and murdered by a criminal who was never caught. She, too, was driven to join the Grail in the hopes of bringing justice back to the world. They both are recruited by Starr to take part in a coup that he sets in motion. Their first encounter with Jesse, Tulip, and Cassidy at the Jesus DeSade party results in Hoover being compelled to collect three million grains of beach sand after Jesse uses the Word on him; Featherstone, seeing what happened to Hoover, was able to hide and cover her ears to prevent herself from hearing the Word.

After laboring on a remote beach for several years, Hoover finally collects three million grains of sand, allowing his compulsion to break. His mission has left him a broken man both physically and emotionally, and he becomes obsessed with seeking revenge on Jesse, who has by this time completely forgotten Hoover existed. Upon seeing Hoover's shocking state, Jesse apologizes for his disproportionate revenge, causing Hoover to break down in confusion. Jesse uses the Word to make Hoover forget the entire ordeal, which instantly changes Hoover's outlook on life. He becomes happier, reignites his crush on Featherstone, and undermines Starr's authority with minor practical jokes.

Over the course of the series, Featherstone begins to fall in love with Starr, believing that his darker acts are simply a means to achieve a greater good. As his vendetta against Custer gets more out of control and Starr starts slowly destroying the Grail, Featherstone comes to doubt him, but remains loyal, believing that his ruthlessness is a part of his plan. When Herr Starr's plans for doomsday (and Featherstone's hope for divine justice) are destroyed because of Starr's personal need for vengeance against Jesse, Featherstone realizes that Starr is both evil and insane. In a last-ditch effort to stop him from destroying the Grail, Featherstone attempts to assassinate Starr, who shoots her down without a second thought. Seeing the woman he loves murdered causes Hoover to snap. Screaming "Motherfucker!", he charges Starr, only to likewise be gunned down. He dies atop Featherstone's body.

In the AMC Preacher TV series, Featherstone and Hoover are portrayed by Julie Ann Emery and Malcolm Barrett. Featherstone's first name is given as Sarah in the TV series as well as in the comics, her hair is black and she is not seen wearing glasses. Hoover remains mostly unchanged from his comic book counterpart but becomes a vampire and is eventually killed by Herr Starr, who exposes him to sunlight, late in season 3.

=== Jody and T.C. ===
Jody is Marie L'Angelle's most trusted enforcer, often paired with T.C. for missions. Jesse calls him "the leading expert on fucking people over before they can fuck him". He has a gift for machines, and having spent his teen years on the plains, he has a deep knowledge of cattle. Massively muscled, he can send a man flying with one punch, and he has an incredible tolerance for pain and injury, being able to take a nailed plank of wood to the face without wincing, and able to remain foul-mouthed, and direct whilst on fire. Jody believes that he does Jesse the favor of toughening Jesse up with his pattern of abuse, calling him a crybaby directly after shooting Jesse's father, nailing Jesse's beloved dog to the farmyard fence, and weighting down Jesse's "coffin" with his best friend. Jesse finally kills Jody during a fistfight on the L'Angelle ranch, in which it appears that Jesse breaks his spine. Jody does appear to care for Jesse, as he fixes the bones which he breaks while toughening Jesse up, although he does seem to resent the fact that Marie cares more for Jesse than she does for him. It is implied that Jody had always trained Jesse to be stronger than he was, able to beat him in hand-to-hand combat. When Jesse attacks T.C. for murdering Billy-Bob, Jody tests Jesse for the first time. Jody's last words are "Prouda you, boy," before Jesse strangles him, having finally beaten him in a fair fight, telling him to "Fucking die!". It was Jody's training alone that allowed Jesse to become as tough and adept as he is. Though Jesse hated Jody, he does hold him in high respect, acknowledging Jody as one of the most important people that shaped his life.

T.C. is one of Ms. L'Angelle's "law" enforcers. His primary interest is having sex with practically any creature or inanimate object (including the cake presented to Jesse for his tenth birthday) he can find. Even going as far as necrophilia, as there was concern by Marie L'Angelle he might attempt it with Tulip after she was killed and had Jody keep the two apart. T.C. is very violent, willing to kill anyone he is ordered to or anyone who gets in his way or annoys him. Though he is nowhere near as skilled as Jody in combat, he is still extremely dangerous, especially when paired with Jody. In a synchronized attack, the two of them were able to kill a large troop of mercenaries. T.C.'s level of perversion bewilders even Jody, without whom he is seldom seen. When Jesse exacts his revenge at Angelville on all of its inhabitants, T.C., much to his horror, is killed by a newly resurrected Tulip, realizing in his final moments that, despite his belief that he would be saved, he is going to Hell.

Jody and T.C. are portrayed by Jeremy Childs and Colin Cunningham in season 3 of the AMC Preacher television series. Jody's hand and tattooed wrist had previously appeared in the first two seasons, portrayed by an uncredited stand-in. T.C.'s full name in the show is revealed to be Theodore Charles.

=== Marie L'Angelle ===
Marie L'Angelle was the wheelchair-using grandmother of Jesse Custer. She was a cold-blooded and wretched woman, a Christian fanatic who took any counter-measures for her designs to work, such as threatening the death of John Custer should he ever try to leave Angelville. She punishes family members by sealing them inside a weighted down coffin with an air tube put in the bottom of the swamp, without food or water, to stir and crawl within their own urine and feces for up to a month. She wanted Jesse to become a minister, and punished him with the coffin often. She later sends Jody and T.C. to find Jesse after he escapes, and later makes a pact with God to kill Tulip to assert control over Jesse, though God brings her back, which leads to her killing T.C. and setting the house on fire. Marie is finally killed when the flames hit her oxygen tank and her corpse is blown out of the house, sending her straight to Hell for her sins against Jesse.

Marie is portrayed by Betty Buckley in season 3 of the comic's TV adaptation. She had previously appeared as a cameo in season 2 portrayed by Julie Oliver-Touchstone.

=== The Messiah ===
The Messiah is the last descendant of Jesus Christ, under the control and protection of the secret and powerful organization the Grail. According to the history of the Grail, the death of Jesus Christ by crucifixion was a ruse — he was drugged with a soporific by his followers to fake the appearance of death. After his revival he married, had a family, and reached middle age before being killed by a runaway cart. The organization that eventually becomes the Grail takes his children and keeps them in seclusion, where they are allowed to mate only with one another, in order to preserve their holy bloodline. By the time of Allfather D'Aronique's reign, the last two descendants, a mated brother and sister, are severely inbred, ugly and mentally handicapped; only the mystic power of their bloodline makes its continuation possible at all.

When the Messiah is born, his mother is killed during the birth, and his father had already accidentally killed himself in his rage when his sister-wife was taken from him to birth their son. The Messiah is a gawky-looking, mentally handicapped, unstoppably cheerful young teenage boy who is generally allowed to run wild under D'Aronique's watch. He often uses the nonsense word "Humperdidoo" as a cheerful punctuation to his statements. Starr eventually decides that Allfather D'Aronique's plan to set up a one world government with the Messiah as its puppet ruler is madness, which leads to the Messiah being killed during the coup after D'Aronique lands on him.

Tyson Ritter portrays the Messiah in the Preacher AMC TV adaptation as well as Jesus Christ. The Messiah is occasionally referred to as Humperdoo, similar to his punctuation Humperdidoo from the comics.

=== Miss Oatlash ===
Miss Oatlash is Odin Quincannon's lawyer, who mainly uses her talents to protect his illegal operations and keep his minions out of jail. She is a Nazi apologist who idolizes Adolf Hitler and maintains that he was a peaceful man who had nothing to do with the Holocaust. She is also an amateur sado-masochistic dominatrix who craves sex with a man who meets her standards for an Aryan Übermensch. Without Quincannon's knowledge she becomes obsessed with Jesse Custer, leading to his capture, whereupon she binds and dresses him as a Nazi SS staff officer, with the intent of raping him. With Skeeter's help Jesse escapes and leaves her tied to the bed instead - her parting words to Custer being "I like it like this!"

=== Odin Quincannon ===
Odin Quincannon is a wealthy businessman who makes his fortune from a meat-processing plant and who also bears a striking similarity to 1992 independent party presidential candidate Ross Perot. He has near-total control over the town of Salvation. He is also an ardent member of the local branch of the Ku Klux Klan, and uses his fellow Klansmen as his hired muscle. Odin clashes with Jesse Custer many times during Jesse's tenure as sheriff of Salvation, using varied illegal activities, including murder, to attack Jesse and his allies. At one point, he threatens to destroy the entire town using carefully planted explosives. A lightning blast injures Odin, but he escapes anyway.

Jesse follows him back to his plant and tracks him down by following a trail of blood. In his private shed, Jesse sees Odin having sex with a giant, woman-shaped mannequin made out of various meat products. Jesse crushes his neck under his boot in what he describes as a "mercy killing". After his death, his brother Conan replaced the meat plant with a waste management plant.

In the AMC Preacher television series, Odin Quincannon is portrayed by Jackie Earle Haley in season 1 as the Annville town employer for Quinncannon Meat & Power.

=== Conan Quincannon ===
Conan Quincannon is Odin Quincannon's brother. He is a kind-hearted environmentalist, which is the polar opposite of everything that makes up Odin. He moves to Salvation after the destruction of his brother's meat processing plant and converts the plant to produce fertilizer from manure, describing his trade by saying "I'm in shit". He offers Arseface a job shoveling manure at the request of a smitten Lorie Bobbs.

=== Hugo Root ===
Hugo Root is the mean-hearted father of Arseface and a local sheriff. Root is an alcoholic and racist who believes "Martian niggers" are the source of America's ills. The turning point in Root's life comes after his first encounter with Jesse Custer and the Saint of Killers, which leaves his deputies dead and a helicopter downed. He is ridiculed for his story and eventually seeks out Custer. He kidnaps Tulip, which eventually leads Custer to use his power after telling Root to "go fuck himself". Against his will, Root maims himself, inserting his genitals into his anus. While being treated in an ambulance, he asks his son to retrieve his gunbelt. In front of paramedics and his son, Root commits suicide, which then leads his son to hunt down Custer.

In the AMC Preacher television series, Sheriff Hugo Root is portrayed by W. Earl Brown.

=== Frankie Toscani ===
Frankie Toscani is a former member of the Mafia who works for Herr Starr as a torturer. After being captured and given a forcible penectomy by Russian mobsters, he was ostracized by his family as they felt him unworthy to succeed to its leadership. Starr has him torture Cassidy in Masada by shooting him multiple times with a Lee–Enfield rifle, then repeating the process after Cassidy regenerates. He is killed when Jesse punches him into the pit Cassidy is held in, causing him to break his neck and lie helpless as Cassidy drains him of his blood.

In the AMC Preacher television series, Frankie is portrayed by Lachy Hulme in season 4.
