= Saint of Killers =

Fictional character

- The Saint of Killers, as drawn by Glenn Fabry

Publication information
- Publisher: Vertigo Comics
- First appearance: Cameo: Preacher #1 (1995); Full: Preacher #2 (1995)
- Created by: Garth Ennis; Steve Dillon

In-story information
- Species: God
- Place of origin: Earth
- Team affiliations: Confederacy
- Notable aliases: Patron Saint of Murderers and Assassination, Death Bringer
- Abilities: Divinity; Immortality; Invulnerability; Superhuman strength, speed, and stamina; Extrasensory perception; Physiological manipulation (density); Magic gun; Outstanding swordsman and marksman; Master tracker; No need for air, food or water; Multiple magical powers
Saint of Killers
- Genre: Superhero

The Saint of Killers is a fictional character who appears in the comic book series Preacher, published by Vertigo Comics in 1995. Writer Garth Ennis created the Saint of Killers with artist Steve Dillon. The Saint is described as "a grim, taciturn, implacable killing machine" with supernatural abilities involving divinity, immortality, and influence over Heaven and Hell. His goals typically center on bringing down individuals through destruction and death by the laws of Paradise.

The Saint of Killers first appeared as a heartless murderer. He is transformed into the Angel of Death, tasked with collecting the souls of those who die by violence. The Saint was a primary antagonist in the Preacher series, who is ordered by Heaven to kill protagonist, Jesse Custer, due to his possession by the entity Genesis. Aside from Ennis and Dillon's Preacher, the Saint was featured in his own four-issue limited series, Preacher: Saint of Killers, which expanded on the Saint's background and motivation, and has appeared briefly in the DC Comics series Hitman. He was portrayed by Graham McTavish in the television series adaptation of Preacher. The Saint's character and the nature of his evil have been the subject of considerable critical attention.

Empire ranked The Saint of Killers number 43 in their 50 Greatest Comic Characters of All Time, Topless Robot placed him number 3 in their Top 10 Least Heroic Antiheroes, What Culture placed the Saint #57 on their list of the 100 Greatest Comic Book Villains Of All Time, and the character ranked #74 on IGN's Top 100 Comic Book Villains compilation.

== Publication history ==
[..] specifically in his later movies, the long coat, the wide brimmed hat, the old Colt revolvers, but [Steve Dillon] preferred Lee Marvin and that's why you've got this character who I always think moves, speaks and has all the mannerisms of Eastwood but has that kind of handsome ugliness that Lee Marvin had.

— Garth Ennis, describing his creation of the Saint of Killers.

In his foreword to Preacher: Ancient History, Ennis reveals that Clint Eastwood provided the inspiration for the character of the Saint of Killers, specifically his character William Munny in the film Unforgiven. Ennis wanted to evoke the image of the outlaw, while also emphasizing the Saint's role as a sinner - one who is "unforgiven". Artist Steve Dillon based the Saint's face on actor Lee Marvin.

Regarding the Saint's origin story, Ennis declared, "His story is a myth. All Westerns are."

== Fictional character biography ==
=== Origins ===
The Saint of Killers' past fought for the Confederacy in the American Civil War and was one of the most violent, bloodthirsty soldiers on the battlefield. His reputation grew throughout the conflict, and after the war he was held in high regard and feared not only by the people he fought against and alongside, but by people who'd only heard of his legend. When the war ended, he returned to Texas, earning money from bounties on Indian scalps.

During a raid on a group of Apaches, he met a captive young lady. Although he maintained that his intention was not to save her and only did because she happened to be there, she was quite thankful and insisted on staying with him instead of returning to her home in Laredo, Texas. She saw a good man within him, and felt it her mission to bring the goodness out. They were together for a decade, had a daughter, and lived off the land, happy and settled. For the first time in his life, the Saint of Killers felt satisfaction and knew that there was more to his life than killing and the sport of death.

At some point, his wife and daughter caught a fever and became bedridden, with the only medicine being a week away by horse. He pledged to get the medicine and get back in time. However, he was delayed in the town of Ratwater, Texas, by a gang of outlaws led by Gumbo McCready. As a result, by the time he returned home, his wife and daughter were already dead. Grief-stricken, he returned to the town of Ratwater and went on a killing spree, hunting down each of the gang members until all but McCready were dead. McCready took a girl hostage, but the gunslinger shot her through the head to get to his prey. However, that turned out to be his last bullet, and McCready was able to get the advantage, knocking him out and impaling him through the chest with a shovel.

=== The Making of the Saint ===
Due to his many murders, the soldier was sent to Hell. When a soul enters Hell, the horror of the environment's sheer hostility evaporates away the humanity and emotion from it, but the soldier's hatred was so strong, it was able to persist. The freezing cold soul of the gunman caused Hell to literally freeze over, drawing the Devil out of his palace to investigate.

The Devil tried beating the hatred out of the soldier, to no avail. Eventually the soldier revealed his history, the source of his hate, and his continuing desire for vengeance. The Angel of Death, in the area for a poker game and weary of his position, suggested a solution to both of their problems: the gunman would take his place, bringing death at God's will. He would wield two pistols, cast from the Angel's sword, and he could have his revenge and much more. The man agreed. The Devil tended to the gunman's wounds, the magical Walker Colts were cast, and the man left Hell—but not before gunning down the Devil after the latter insulted him.

He returned to earth and slaughtered everyone in the town of Ratwater, including McCready and the corrupt preacher who traveled with him. His killing was indiscriminate: no man, woman, nor child in the town was spared. Due to his dangerously uncontrollable nature, Heaven arranged for him to be put into a deep slumber, until God had need of him as His instrument of death and destruction.

Four years after the events at Ratwater, he was summoned at a place called Wounded Knee Creek.

=== The Preacher ===
For the final time, an Angel was sent to wake the Saint of Killers and to instruct him with the task of finding and killing a young man named Jesse Custer. Before being shot through the head by the Saint, he spoke to him about the offspring of both demon and angel, Genesis; whose power was greater than God's. Because of Genesis's possession of Jesse, the young preacher has been granted ability of The Word of God, allowing him to give vocal orders that cannot be disobeyed, and this frightened the Angels.

The Saint agreed. Within a few hours of appointment, he shot his way through the county sheriff's department and was hot on Custer's trail. He eventually found Jesse in a small motel, but both of his guns were stayed by Jesse's voice. This marked the first time that the Saint of Killers was held back from his mission, and a target was allowed to flee. Apart from that, the angel revealed that God, the only power in the Universe that could command the Saint, abandoned Heaven. He let the Preacher go, but vowed to track him down.

He crossed Jesse's path after Jesse left Angelville, the estate of Marie L'Angell, the monstrous matriarch of the L'Angell clan. Angelville was burned to the ground, and all of L'Angell's henchmen were killed. Jesse eluded him for a while, but it was time for the Saint to find him again. The Saint realised that without God in Heaven, there was no one who could command him. The Saint was now able to follow his own path to find Jesse Custer, with no constraints. He travelled to Las Vegas, to find the angels, who started a casino and were easy to find. In their terror, the angels told him everything – Jesse went to France to confront The Grail, a worldwide organization dedicated to triggering the Apocalypse and ruling the world. The Saint hijacked a freighter, killing everyone on board, and sailed it directly to Europe. When he discovered The Grail's headquarters, he homed in on Custer. The Preacher was in a basement with The Grail's Sacred Executioner, Herr Starr; and the Saint was more than willing to kill both Custer and Starr.

Yet again, his hand was stayed. In their possession, The Grail held captive an Angel, to which the Seraph told them that the entity Genesis was the key in gaining answers to God's abandonment of Heaven, as well as the reasons as to why the Saint's wife and daughter died; which intrigued the man, thus taking up the offer. He held off the soldiers of The Grail, giving both Jesse and Starr the chance to get the information they needed from the Seraph – they learned that Jesse possessed all the knowledge of Genesis, but in order to unlock its memories they should travel to the American West and use Native American peyote. Jesse and Starr escaped before the whole base exploded, burying the Saint under several millions of tons of rock and masonry, from which the Saint unearthed himself and made his way back to the United States of America.

Many months later, the Saint encountered Custer and Tulip O'Hare. Jesse told the Saint the truth about why McCready delayed him from his family, which revealed that their deaths were not accidental. Discovering the truth placed the Saint into a fit of rage, and he stepped out and confronted the forces of the U.S. Army and the Grail; single-handedly taking on hundreds of soldiers, tanks and helicopters, and destroying every force that was pitted up against him, which drove Starr to pressure the President into sending a stealth bomber to Monument Valley, turning it into an irradiated wasteland with the Saint in the center of it.

Amongst the flames and the ubiquitous radiation, the Saint stood up and spat, "Not enough gun."

=== God ===
With no one to command him and no targets, the Saint had no purpose. His activities during this point in time are relatively unknown; though after one year he felt a strong sensation which compelled him to go back to Ratwater, Texas, where Jesse was with the Saint's human remains.

Custer told the Saint everything he learned in his quest for God – that God was an attention-fiend, and that he was willing to cause pain, destruction and death for no other reason than to see who would love him. He sparked a war between the angels to find out who would stay on his side. He created a world full of humans who would fight in his name, just to see who adored him more, and that he engineered the creation of Genesis, a being as powerful as Him, in order to see if He could make it love Him.

Custer had a plan; a way of paying God back for the horrors he inflicted upon his creation. But Jesse would require the Saint's help if such a thing were to work. The guns the Saint carried were lethal – no shot hit that did not kill, and their first kill was none other than the Devil himself. But they couldn't simply shoot God, as he shielded himself from Jesse and Genesis's detection. As long as they were looking for Him, God wouldn't budge, but it was the belief of Jesse that if Genesis were out of the picture, that God would head straight for Heaven, where the Saint of Killers would be waiting for him.

When the Saint entered Heaven, the entire Heavenly host was arrayed against him. Rank upon rank of angel flew to keep him away from the heavenly gates, and they were all shot down by his guns. After Jesse's plan worked with Genesis released and God returning to retake his throne, the Saint was waiting for him. God begged for his life, and offered the Saint whatever he wanted – power, life, the lives of his family, anything. But the Saint didn't want anything God offered him. All he wanted, he said, was to rest. The Saint of Killers shot God dead and sat on His throne, pulling his hat over his eyes, and went to sleep, presumably forever.

== Characterization ==
=== Appearance ===
The Saint of Killers towering over Jesse

The Saint of Killers' body is humanoid and its composition is similar to that of a normal human, with a build similar to a tall muscular male in great physical shape. He is extremely imposing in both height and relative size throughout the Preacher series; generally remains above that of average human height; is distinctly broad-shouldered, generally towering over his fellow characters, including Jesse Custer. Chronologically speaking, his first description was given as, "Just a stooped and weathered man on a flea-bit mare, the Walker Colt worn backwards on his hip and the Henry rifle by his saddle silent now for many a year."

As the Saint of Killers grew up during the early 19th Century and the trade to which he was in, his costume started out differently. As time progressed and came the period where he was tracking the band of Kiowa and meeting of his future wife, we see the Saint sans-coat donning a blue shirt, cross-suspenders, grey trousers and his wide brimmed hat.

While in Hell much of his clothing remained, until Satan whipped him repeatedly which tore his coat to shreds along with the skin and flesh from his back. Shortly after being bequeathed the title of 'The Saint of Killers', by the Angel of Death, he was presented with the attire he would remain with while placed on Earth: a long loose-fitting yellow duster coat, a wide brimmed hat, two Colt revolvers, and a cross draw holster at the trouser belt line.

=== Personality ===
The Saint of Killers, though supremely powerful and feared, suffers with an explosive temper, which has been triggered through insolence or disrespect, of which the latter was seen when he slew the Devil. His resolve and vengeance were so strong that during the events of Ratwater he was killing indiscriminately, with children dying at his hand. However, perhaps due to his longevity and realization of "damning himself", he begins to show leniency in certain areas, for example, he will not necessarily kill unless provoked. He too has shown new-found compassion and awareness when he learns of information pertaining to his family from Custer, by which he was approaching the role of an anti-hero. From his radically altered perspective, which awakens when he learns of God's purpose and when he fulfills his vengeance, almost all human concerns appear pointless and without obvious merit, to which he sleeps.

Custer once stated, "Before the world shook to the thunder of his guns, there was yet some good in his heart: and that was the tragedy." While Jesse acknowledged the Saint's "ten long years" of attempting to change from his past during the Civil War; he trembled when Custer brought up the events of Ratwater, and he too has shown aspects of compassion through mercy killing.

=== Powers and abilities ===
Throughout Preacher, he is shown to be immensely powerful and seemingly invulnerable to all harm, to an extent rarely seen in comics; bullets bounced off him, a direct hit from a tank didn't affect him, being underneath a collapsing mountain simply meant he had to dig himself out, and being hit in the chest with a nuclear missile caused no damage to him or his clothes. He also felt no pain and shrugged off the whole affair with the words, "Not enough gun." He is also apparently immovable unless he wishes to be moved: At one point an M-1 Abrams tank moving at speed rammed him, and he stopped it with a kick.

The Saint has demonstrated a degree of superhuman strength. For example, when hit by the vampire Cassidy in a speeding truck the Saint did not budge, and the truck was flipped. When Jesse Custer tried to put his hand on the Saint's shoulder the Saint of Killers flung him several feet like a rag doll. While possessing these abilities, he apparently has the power to enter and leave Heaven at will, although it is not known whether or not he could similarly travel to Hell. Several other transportation and omnipresence abilities have been suggested in his possession, but it is limited in that he must know the place to go to. This weakness can be seen when he was tracking down Jesse Custer and threatened to "Kill his way across half Creation", but ended up being forced to commandeer a ship to travel from America to France.

Additionally, even before being made a saint he was an expert marksman. Now, however, he is able to draw his guns faster than a man can see, at a seemingly superhuman rate; coupled with a perfect aim — even when men were hanging off his arms the Saint could shoot true and find his target mark. Also, whilst in combat, he has also displayed proficient swordsmanship. His hatred appears to be his greatest power. His hatred was cold enough to temporarily extinguish the fires of Hell and has been the driving force of his existence ever since.

=== Weapons ===
The Saint of Killers possesses a pair of Walker Colt revolver pistols, which were bequeathed to him by the Angel of Death, composed from the previous Angel's steel sword and forged in the last fire that burned in Hell, because of the nature of their making, the guns are supernatural in nature:

- They possess unlimited ammunition, and never need to be reloaded.
- They never jam.
- Any shot fired from these guns will always hit its mark, even piercing modern tank armor to reach the intended target.
- His weapons are ultimately lethal to anything: humans, angels, demons, Satan, or even God, any wound inflicted is always fatal regardless of circumstance. The only way to survive the gun is if the target is already dead, as in Cassidy's case.
- Whoever holds the guns can see the mutilated spirits of the victims of the Saint of Killers.

Before becoming the Saint of Killers, his arsenal included a Henry repeating rifle, a Model 1860 Light Cavalry Saber, a Bowie knife, as well as a pair of non-divine Walker Colt pistols.

=== Weaknesses ===
His only definite technical weakness appears to be information pertaining to his former life, particularly that of his family; when Herr Starr uses this against him; and as Jesse convinces him that God is at fault for his family's death, which instead alters the Saint's trail from Jesse's to the deity's. Jesse's usage of the Saint's buried remains, in the act of summoning the being, may too be seen as an exploitation in terms of a weakness of inquisitiveness.

While possessed by Genesis, Jesse used the 'Word of God' to perform the feat of command and compelled the Saint of Killers to stay his hand, which was the only time in the Saint's existence where he was prevented from killing.

=== Analysis and themes ===
The character of The Saint of Killers is an eternal bounty hunter, one who delights in gratuitous violence on the American frontier in the 1880s following a personal disaster. Ennis described his creation of the Saint as owing much to Clint Eastwood "specifically in his later movies, the long coat, the wide brimmed hat, the old Colt revolvers", however, co-creator [Dillon] preferred Lee Marvin and, as Ennis explained, "that's why you've got this character who I always think moves, speaks and has all the mannerisms of Eastwood but has that kind of handsome ugliness that Lee Marvin had." Dr Julia Round of The Media School, Bournemouth University has suggested such symbols were described as being somewhat reflective commentary on the west, by being "conscious appropriations of its underlying mechanisms", as both Ennis and Dillon based the character of the Saint specifically on the actors as not the characters they played; which is seen throughout Preacher as a means of reflecting the "expectations and genre anxiety" of the readers through the acknowledgement of sources and usage of "implicit commentary.

Michael Grimshaw of the University of Canterbury observes that the Preacher's undercurrent of the violent frontier of the Saint of Killers acts both as a "sub-narrative and explanatory device". He highlights the significance of "blood" and the "murderous acts" committed which have tainted the lands and its denizens, while adding "a land founded on violence can never be pure or peaceful." and placing a degree of emphasis on the link between ideological basis of "blood sacrifice" in the Easter Rising, of which he deems a just comparison. And expresses acknowledgement to Garth Ennis' critique of "neo-romantic ideology" in terms of the "sacrificial outpouring of blood" and its involvement in the alteration of the environment. Within general summary, Grimshaw makes references to Jean Baudrillard's Hyperrealism and Friedrich Nietzsche's God is dead statement.

Grimshaw additionally highlights Ennis' respect and influence, when composing the Saint, as "major" with regard him and the character of William Munny in Clint Eastwood's Unforgiven, placing a juxtaposition through the said commentary, "The Saint of Killers returns to his vigilante ways when his family is brutally murdered in his absence." He then explains and points out the link between the Saint's indestructibility and that of "recent pop-culture vigilantes" such as RoboCop and The Terminator, while at the same time noting that there is to be a difference by describing the Saint as a "spiritual alien cyborg" from the past acting in the present, as opposed to the future and past dynamic by the latter of the two; he also makes references to Mary Shelley's Frankenstein. He too points out the "theological" nature of Preacher and emphasises that the Saint of Killers is "a reminder of the destructiveness that lurks within humanity" whilst adding "... unleashed by God's interference and then abandonment", only if the "future mechanical cyborg killer" was indeed a result of humanity's deemed inherit interference with the natural created order.

Using the perspective of Philosopher Julia Kristeva, Grimshaw places significance on the Kristevan outlook in that "The world is a site of Kristevan abjection", whilst adding that "The corpse, seen without God and outside of science, is the utmost of abjection. It is death infecting life." Infusing such an ideology into Ennis' Preacher, specifically tying it to the Saint, he deduces that the reanimated corpse of the Saint of Killers which "[stalks] heaven and earth in pursuit of his divine prey" is in fact a leakage of death into life.

Niall Kitson believes every character in Ennis and Dillon's work has a sort of value system, stating, "those who appear good have an innate darkness to them and even the blackest of demons is capable of acting to a moral code", of which the Saint of Killers himself isn't immune to due to displays of such a logical moral system of thought, while Kitson builds upon such proposition by further adding, "[The Saint] has a background steeped in pathos and is not averse to making a deal when it suits his needs". Thus Kitson believes that in some cases the Saint epitomises the antihero, as in his identification of a "narrative construction" with the vampire Cassidy, which he stated to provide a "continuity between the world of men and God", he acknowledges that the same could be of the Saint, "[...] but for the fact that his origins remain undisclosed until later in the narrative and his character as gun for hire only later transforms in a sympathetic loner with a mission".

The Saint's background has been explored, as well as Ennis' Spaghetti Western influences. Kjartan Fossberg Jónsson argues that while Jesse is Ennis' representation on the "western hero" while the Saint represents "the old west, film, and myth." Jónsson specifically identifies similarities between the opening panels of Preacher: The Saint of Killers and the opening scenes of Sergio Corbucci's The Great Silence (1968). While showing additional comparisons to Sergio Leone's films, by commenting on Leone's fusion of landscape and facial features, and concluded such a point by suggesting, "All characters in the miniseries have peculiar faces, especially the gang of outlaws"; he concluded by suggesting that Clint Eastwood's influence on the Saint "strengthens [the] ink" of the Spaghetti Western influence throughout.

== In other media ==
=== Television ===
The Saint of Killers appears in AMC TV show Preacher. In the series, he is portrayed by Scottish actor Graham McTavish. Simply referred to as The Cowboy in the first season, the character's real name is revealed to be William Munny in the second season episode "On Your Knees", after Clint Eastwood's character from Unforgiven.

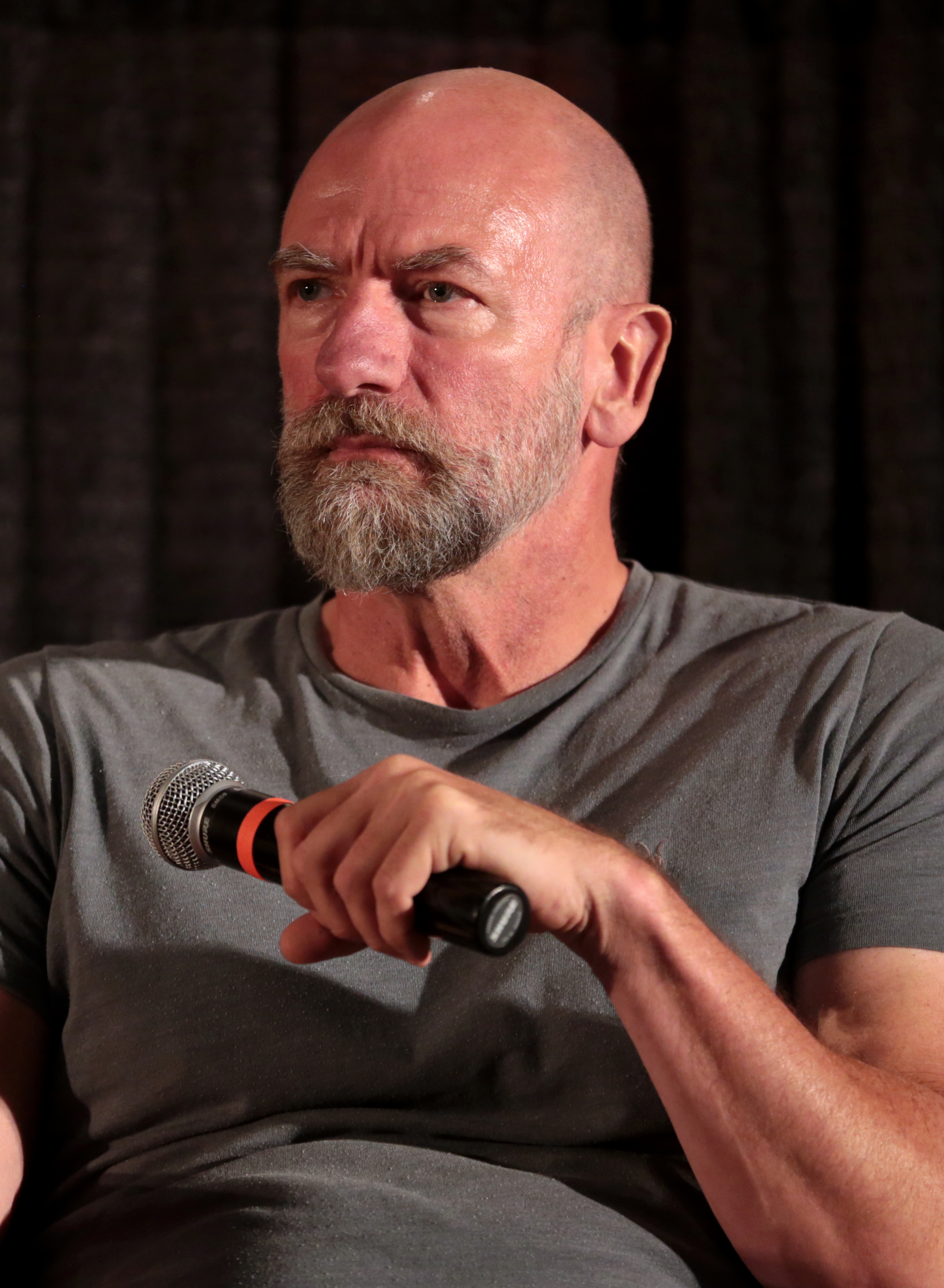
Graham McTavish, who portrays the Saint of Killers in the television adaptation.

=== References in other works ===
The Saint of Killers has also been referenced or parodied in other forms of media, including:

- Belgian band Diablo Boulevard released a song titled "Saint of Killers" on their 2011 album Builders of Empires.
- The Saint of Killers is the subject of the song "Bury Me With My Guns On" by American metal band Bobaflex, from the Hell in my Heart album. The song specifically references the deaths of both the Devil and God at the hands of the Saint of Killers, including the massacre of angels when the Saint reached the gates of heaven.

== See also ==
- List of DC Comics characters
