= The Sundowner (2010 film) =

- Film poster
- Directed by: Steve Christolos
- Produced by: Alan Wigley; Steve Christolos
- Starring: Jon Bendz; Tim Tomchak
- Cinematography: Steve Christolos
- Edited by: Steve Christolos
- Music by: Chris Waltz; Vashti Bunyan
- Release date: January 25, 2010 (Slamdance)
- Running time: 19 minutes
- Country: United States
- Language: English

The Sundowner is an American documentary short film directed by Steve Christolos and starring Jon Bendz and Tim Tomchak. It is the story of a civil engineer who builds a 53-foot yacht completely by himself, and tries to sail around the world. The film premiered at Slamdance Film Festival in Park City, Utah on January 25, 2010. It was produced by Alan Wigley.

The film was screened at the San Francisco Frozen Film Festival in 2010.

== Premise ==
Unable to ignore the call of the ocean, a civil engineer builds his own fifty-three foot sailboat and sets sail, transforming his dream of life at sea into reality. In jagged waters, he is in turn transformed from a man of hubris to a man of humility.

== Cast ==
- Jon Bendz as Self
- Tim Tomchak as Self
