= Sundowning (disambiguation) =

Sundowning is a symptom common in dementia, mainly in Alzheimer's disease.

Sundowning may also refer to

- Sundowning (Sleep Token album), 2019
- Sundowning (This Is Hell album), 2006

== See also ==
- "Sundown Syndrome", a 2009 song by Tame Impala
