= Cemetary (band) =

Swedish metal band

- Origin: Borås, Sweden
- Genres: Gothic metal, death metal (early)
- Years active: 1989–1997, 2004–2005, 2022–present
- Labels: Black Mark Production; Reigning Phoenix
- Past members: Mathias Lodmalm; Anders Iwers; Tomas Josefsson; Markus Nordberg

Cemetary is a Swedish heavy metal band that Mathias Lodmalm founded in 1989.

== History ==
In the early 1990s, the band signed a contract with Black Mark Production and released their debut album, An Evil Shade of Grey, in 1992. The band recorded one more album before moving from death metal to a gothic metal style with Black Vanity (1994), Sundown (1996) and Last Confessions (1997). After a seven-year break, the band reunited in 2004 and released their final LP, Phantasma. In May 2005, Mathias Lodmalm posted a message on the band's website announcing that he was leaving the scene for good because of dissatisfaction with the people he did business with.

During his break from Cemetary, Lodmalm released albums in a similar style under the moniker Sundown, and an album titled The Beast Divine as Cemetary 1213 by Century Media.

In December 2022, Lodmalm announced on Cemetary's Facebook profile that a new album was due in 2023 and that a record deal had been signed. The first new song would be released in January 2023. Several months later they announced they had signed to Atomic Fire Records.

== Members ==
- Mathias Lodmalm – lead vocals, guitars, keyboards (1989–1997, 2004–2005, 2022–), bass, drums (2004–2005)
- Mattias Borgh, drums 2022-
- Juha Sievers – drums (1989–1993)
- Zrinko Culjak – bass (1989–1993)
- Christian Saarinen – guitars (1991–1992)
- Anton Hedberg – guitars (1992–1993)
- Markus Nordberg – drums (1993–1997)
- Thomas Josefsson – bass (1993–1997)
- Anders Iwers – guitars (1993–1997)

== Discography ==
- Incarnation of Morbidity (demo) (1990)
- In Articulus Mortis (demo) (1991)
- An Evil Shade of Grey (1992)
- Godless Beauty (1993)
- Black Vanity (1994)
- Sundown (1996)
- Last Confessions (1997)
- Sweetest Tragedies (1999) (compilation)
- The Beast Divine (2000)
- Phantasma (2005)
