= Sundown (band) =

Swedish metal band

Sundown was a gothic metal band formed by Mathias Lodmalm and Johnny Hagel. It was disbanded when Mathias Lodmalm reformed Cemetary together with Christian Silver and Herman Engström. All of Sundown's albums were released by Century Media Records.

== Discography ==
- Aluminum EP (1997)
- Design 19 (1997)
- Halo (1999)
- Glimmer (1999)

== Members ==
- Mathias Lodmalm
- Johnny Hagel
- Andreas Karlsson
- Andreas Johansson
- Herman Engström
