= List of Preacher episodes =

Preacher is an American television series developed by Sam Catlin, Evan Goldberg, and Seth Rogen for AMC starring Dominic Cooper. It is based on the comic book series Preacher created by Garth Ennis and Steve Dillon, and published by DC Comics' Vertigo imprint. The series was officially picked up on September 9, 2015, with a ten-episode order which premiered on May 22, 2016.

During the course of the series, 43 episodes of Preacher aired over four seasons.

== Series overview ==
Season	Episodes	Originally released	
Season	Episodes	First released	Last released
1	10	May 22, 2016	July 31, 2016
2	13	June 25, 2017	September 11, 2017
3	10	June 24, 2018	August 26, 2018
4	10	August 4, 2019	September 29, 2019

== Episodes ==
=== Season 1 (2016) ===
No. overall	No. in season	Title	Directed by	Written by	Original release date	U.S. viewers (millions)
1	1	"Pilot"	Seth Rogen & Evan Goldberg	Story by : Seth Rogen & Evan Goldberg & Sam Catlin; Teleplay by : Sam Catlin	May 22, 2016	2.38
An entity crosses the galaxy and finds its way to planet Earth, where it inhabits a Protestant preacher in Africa who explodes soon after. The same phenomenon is observed at a Satanic temple in Russia and in a gathering of Scientologists. Meanwhile, in Annville, Texas, Jesse Custer, a Protestant preacher with a sordid past, begins to lose his faith in his church and debates leaving. Tulip O'Hare, a mysterious woman from Jesse's violent past, propositions him with a "job", but Jesse turns her down. Cassidy, an Irish vampire, lands in Texas after a violent episode on a private jet. Jesse has a run-in with the abusive husband of one of his churchgoers and quickly subdues him and his friends, meeting Cassidy in the process. Jesse heads to the church to ask for a sign to continue. The entity appears in the church and inhabits Jesse. Three days later, Jesse awakens and decides not to leave the church, saying he is not quite done yet.
2	2	"See"	Seth Rogen & Evan Goldberg	Sam Catlin	June 5, 2016	2.08
In 1881, a cowboy leaves his home and heads for the town "Ratwater" (later it becomes clear, that Annville was founded on its ruins), searching for medicine for his sick daughter. In the present, Jesse baptizes his congregants. One of them, Linus, confesses to Jesse about his urges. Odin Quincannon and his employees tear down a home after purchasing its land. At the church, Jesse takes a drink from Cassidy's flask and passes out due to its potency. DeBlanc and Fiore attempt to extract what's inside Jesse: first with a song, then with a chainsaw. Cassidy interrupts and is shot, but manages to kill them. Tulip continues to nag Jesse about the "job", but he refuses. Jesse uses his new power on Linus. Cassidy buries the bodies of the two men, but they are now alive and back in their motel room being interrogated by Sheriff Root, and they tell him "We're from the Government".
3	3	"The Possibilities"	Scott Winant	Chris Kelley	June 12, 2016	1.75
Tulip meets a woman named Dany in Houston, Texas and receives a piece of paper with the address of the enigmatic Carlos, with Tulip intending Jesse to aid her in confronting and killing the man who ruined their lives. Jesse tests the limits of his newly found abilities of persuasion and finally understands the nature of his abilities when Donnie confronts him with a gun, with Jesse later holding control over him. Cassidy tells Jesse of the possibilities of his abilities, while discovering the true nature of Fiore and DeBlanc: they are angels sent from Heaven, and people will die if they do not retrieve what is inside Jesse.
4	4	"Monster Swamp"	Craig Zisk	Sara Goodman	June 19, 2016	1.14
Cassidy tries to tell Jesse about Fiore and DeBlanc, though it falls on deaf ears as Jesse is distracted by the thought of rebooting All Saints Congregational, wanting more visitors. He later converts Odin Quincannon from atheism to Christianity, using his power, in front of the entire congregation to achieve that goal. Angry at the death of a woman, Tulip carries out a form of vigilante justice, but the consequences are not as expected as she mistakenly throws Cassidy out of a window, only to discover him to be an immortal vampire.
5	5	"South Will Rise Again"	Michael Slovis	Craig Rosenberg	June 26, 2016	1.43
Eugene asks for Jesse's help with him and his dad after a disturbing message is conveyed to Eugene. Jesse abides and helps him in more ways than one. Fiore and DeBlanc attempt to assuage their reason to be on Earth, but are unable to convey their message. Jesse meets with the angels, who inform him of Genesis and Jesse's powers are not to be used; but Jesse has been abusing them to help those who have come to him after persuading Quincannon at the church. Tulip and Cassidy bond after her learning of Cassidy's secret and Quincannon meets with the Green Acres representatives to unexpected results. In 1881, the cowboy witnesses in a side room of the town's saloon a group of villains attacking a family of newly arrived settlers: They kill the father, rape the mother, and force their little son to watch. The unarmed cowboy ignores the scenery and leaves the town with the medicine for his child. But when he notices another prairie schooner with a family heading for Ratwater, he returns to prevent them suffering the same fate as the family before. Back in Ratwater, he must realize the new family is trading Indian scalps and therefore had received a warm welcome by the town's people. The cowboy is badly beaten up and his horse is killed by a cynic preacher, who reveals the cowboy as a former bloodthirsty Confederate soldier, known as the "Butcher of Gettysburg". Forced to make his way home on foot, the cowboy arrives too late: his child is dead, as well as his beloved wife. He grabs his two revolvers and a Union Army sabre, to take revenge.
6	6	"Sundowner"	Guillermo Navarro	Nick Towne	July 3, 2016	1.49
DeBlanc reveals to Jesse the secret of that, what is inside him: "Genesis", the powerful child of an angel and a female demon. Jesse, Fiore, and DeBlanc head to the motel, where they fight a female seraphim, a higher ranking angel, in search for Fiore and DeBlanc, who illegally traveled to Earth. Because angels can't die (when their human body is killed they return within a few seconds), they have to mutilate the seraph to hinder her from further actions. Eugene makes new friends at school. Tulip reaches an understanding with Emily and helps with her chores. Eugene comes to Jesse in the church to have him take back the "forgiveness" Jesse bestowed the town. In anger, Jesse tells Eugene to "go to Hell", making him disappear.
7	7	"He Gone"	Michael Morris	Mary Laws	July 10, 2016	1.55
In the present, Odin Quincannon asks Jesse to sign over the church, claiming to have won the bet. Jesse realizes he did not specify which God Quincannon should believe in, and Quincannon is now serving "The God of Meat". Jesse lies to Sheriff Root about whether he knows what happened to Eugene, and tears up the floor of the church in a desperate attempt to get Eugene back. Cassidy confronts Jesse about sending Eugene to Hell, and exposes himself to the sunlight, revealing himself as a vampire. Even though a young Jesse and Tulip have grown close, Jesse's father hands Tulip over to child protective services. That night, Jesse angrily prays that God will kill his father and send him to Hell. Later, armed men come to the church and kill Jesse's father as Jesse confesses that he prayed for this to happen.
8	8	"El Valero"	Kate Dennis	Olivia Dufault	July 17, 2016	1.65
In the 1980s, Odin Quincannon loses his family (his wife, children, and grandchildren) in a gondola lift accident during winter, prompting his spark for atheism. Jesse fends off Quincannon's attempts to tear down the church, and sees Eugene come back from Hell. Tulip decides to buy a dog. DeBlanc and Fiore are called to the church to extract Genesis in exchange for bringing Eugene back. While Quincannon becomes impatient and plans his assault once again, Donnie figures a way around Jesse's power by making himself deaf. Though Genesis is extracted, it manages to escape after an argument with Jesse, Fiore, and DeBlanc happens. Jesse asks for one more chance from Quincannon with a bigger bet than before.
9	9	"Finish the Song"	Michael Slovis	Craig Rosenberg	July 24, 2016	1.57
In 1881 Ratwater, the Butcher of Gettysburg returns to massacre those who killed his family. He ends up in hell, where he has to re-experience the death of his wife and child again and again. Fiore and DeBlance offer him the chance of being reunited with his family in heaven, when the cowboy kills Jesse and returns Genesis to Fiore and DeBlanc. In the present, Jesse tells Sheriff Root where Eugene is before escaping from the cop car into the night. Fiore and DeBlanc book a trip to Hell. Tulip asks Emily to take care of Cassidy while she takes care of something else, and Emily sees just what Cassidy really is. Sheriff Root discovers in Fiore and DeBlanc's hotel room the mutilated body of the female seraphim and kills her, unknowingly allowing her to come back. Cassidy and Jesse make amends, and Cassidy helps Jesse use the Heaven's phone to find God.
10	10	"Call and Response"	Sam Catlin	Sam Catlin	July 31, 2016	1.72
Tulip comes back looking for Jesse, and finds him hiding at a repentant Donnie's house. Sheriff Root realizes Cassidy is a vampire and uses his immortality as torture to find Eugene's whereabouts. Carlos' betrayal is explained—Tulip and Jesse administer a savage beating instead of killing him. Betsy misleads the police allowing them all to make preparations for the call to God. Though Quincannon shouts his issues with the existence of God to the crowd, Jesse attempts to make the call with technical issues. God seemingly shows up to answer the crowd's questions, but unsatisfied with the answers, Jesse uses The Voice and "God" reveals himself to be an imposter—the real God is missing and no one knows where he is. With people's faith shattered from the call, consequences for the townspeople happen in various ways, which leads to the complete destruction of the town and population of Annville due to negligence at the methane power plant. Jesse, Tulip and Cassidy are at a distant diner, being served by Eugene, where Jesse shares his plan for them to travel and find God. Back at the ruins of Annville the female seraphim is gunned down by a vengeful Saint of Killers, now searching for Jesse. The hell bus returns Fiore alone to Earth.

=== Season 2 (2017) ===
No. overall	No. in season	Title	Directed by	Written by	Original release date	U.S. viewers (millions)
11	1	"On the Road"	Seth Rogen & Evan Goldberg	Sam Catlin	June 25, 2017	1.69
Jesse, Tulip, and Cassidy start their journey to find God, which is quickly put on hold after a police car flags them down and they go on a car chase involving multiple police cars. When they stop due to running out of gas, Jesse uses Genesis to make the police officers do embarrassing things, but they are abruptly interrupted by the Saint of Killers (the cowboy) who begins to massacre all of them. Barely getting away, the trio make their way to Mike, a religious scholar that Jesse knows through his father. Mike reveals that a local strip club manager has supposedly seen God frequent the strip club. When the Saint of Killers arrives shortly after the trio leaves, Mike kills himself to avoid telling him where Jesse is. At the strip club, the manager, Tammy, is forced to tell Jesse and Tulip that God only came because he liked the jazz music, after she is shot accidentally by a security guard that Cassidy was fighting. At a motel later that night, Jesse sees the Saint of Killers walking up the road, and learns that Genesis is unable to work on him.
12	2	"Mumbai Sky Tower"	Seth Rogen & Evan Goldberg	Sam Catlin	June 26, 2017	1.35
Jesse, Cassidy, and Tulip narrowly escape from the Saint of Killers, learning of Annville's fate in the process. Cassidy then remembers that he saw Fiore on television, now an act at a local Indian-style casino and hotel. It is revealed that after coming back from Hell, Fiore attempted to kill himself after the loss of DeBlanc, but ended up earning a job instead as a novelty act where he kills himself and comes back to life. Upon questioning, Fiore reveals to Jesse and Cassidy that the man hunting them down is the Saint of Killers and that the two angels hired him to kill Genesis/Jesse. Cassidy promises Jesse he can "convince" Fiore to call off the Saint of Killers. While at the casino, Tulip runs into a man from her past and kills him during a fight. At the bar, Jesse comes to the conclusion that he might find God in New Orleans. Leaving the hotel, Jesse tells Fiore to "find peace". Fiore tells the Saint of Killers that the contract is still valid, and then asks the Saint to finally kill him, which he does.
13	3	"Damsels"	Michael Slovis	Sara Goodman	July 3, 2017	1.11
Arriving in New Orleans, Jesse, Tulip and Cassidy search jazz bars looking for God. Jesse is appalled when a man in a dog costume is presented to them as God. Eventually, Jesse meets a singer who is later kidnapped by a mysterious group and saved by Jesse. The woman is later revealed to be an operative for the mysterious group and confirms Genesis' existence to their boss, Herr Starr. In the meantime, Tulip and Cassidy go to a house owned by Denis, seemingly a friend of Cassidy's. Tulip tells Cassidy that she is hiding from a man named Viktor, whom she previously betrayed. Hoping to end the problem, Tulip allows herself to be found and caught by Viktor's men. Meanwhile, in Hell, Eugene is made to relive the memory of the day he became "Arseface" repeatedly, with the memory showing it was not his fault. A dysfunction in Hell eventually pulls him out of the memory and shows him to be in a prison-type location. He learns that his cell's door is unlocked and walks out into a long corridor filled with cells. Calling out for help, Eugene is shocked and terrified to see Adolf Hitler walk out of the cell next to him.
14	4	"Viktor"	Michael Slovis	Craig Rosenberg	July 10, 2017	1.19
In an infomercial, Cassidy recognizes the actor who played the imposter God who spoke to Jesse's congregation. They locate his talent manager who provides them with a demo reel given to him by the people who hired the actor. In the tape, the man is executed in order to get to Heaven. Cassidy reveals to Jesse that Tulip went to Viktor and may be in danger. Tulip is met with an extremely frosty reception from everyone at Viktor's home, before Jesse arrives to save her. After confronting Viktor, Tulip tells Jesse that Viktor is her husband. Meanwhile in Hell, the cells keep breaking down, and in down times, Eugene bonds with Hitler and learns that his worst memory is 1918 Munich, when he met an art gallery owner. The superintendent of the ward meets with Eugene to tell him to act evil, because he is in Hell, and that they will be watching him, sanctioning deviant behavior. Upon returning, Hitler is beaten by a fellow inmate, Tyler, with other inmates joining in. Eugene sees the surveillance camera and begins to kick Hitler.
15	5	"Dallas"	Michael Morris	Philip Buiser	July 17, 2017	1.27
In flashbacks, it is shown what happened to Jesse and Tulip after Carlos betrayed them and Tulip lost their unborn child in Dallas. They try to lead a normal life with legal jobs, but fail to get pregnant again. After a while, Tulip secretly resumes her work as a contract criminal. When Jesse finds out that she is back in crime, also learning that she has been taking contraceptive pills all the time, he decides to return to his father's church in order to become a preacher himself, which leads to their breakup. After that Tulip meets Viktor and marries him for his money and power. However, when Dany calls her and tells her that she found Carlos, she leaves Viktor immediately. In the present, Tulip takes her stepdaughter to Denis' house while Jesse ponders killing Viktor. However, Cassidy persuades Jesse not to do it, claiming Tulip has never stopped loving Jesse. Instead, Jesse makes Viktor sign the divorce papers. In the evening, the Saint of Killers appears at Viktor's house looking for Jesse and kills Viktor. At gunpoint, his scared daughter, who has been hiding in a closet, tells the murderer that she knows where Jesse is.
16	6	"Sokosha"	David Evans	Mary Laws	July 24, 2017	1.19
When the Saint of Killers turns up at Denis' home, Jesse, Tulip and Cassidy are just able to escape. At a library, they do research on their pursuer and find out that he has lost his soul. Jesse confronts the Saint and makes a deal with him: He will get him a new soul so he can enter Heaven, but Tulip, Cassidy and Denis, who turns out to be Cassidy's son, have to stay behind. Searching for a soul at a Voodoo shop, Jesse learns that a Japanese company has taken over the soul-dealing business. It is revealed that Jesse comes from a family called L'Angelle, who somehow used to be involved in this. Being unable to find a matching soul in the company's armored truck, Jesse finds out that his own soul does. So he extracts 1% of it and gives it to the Saint just in time. Instead of sending him to Hell, Jesse disarms the Saint of Killers, locks him in the armored truck, and drives it to a place called Angelville, where he sinks it in a swamp.
17	7	"Pig"	Wayne Yip	Olivia Dufault	July 31, 2017	1.25
In Vietnam, Herr Starr investigates the case of a floating pig, which has generated media exposure, and he resolves the matter by ruthlessly killing everyone involved. In flashbacks, it is shown how he joined a powerful organization called the Grail, which preserves the lineage of Jesus Christ for the apocalypse and fights relentlessly any conflicting lore. Meanwhile in New Orleans, Jesse, Tulip and Cassidy participate in a game where people get shot at while wearing a bulletproof vest, and they trick the other players in order to rob their money. Afterwards, Denis tells his father that he is dying from congestive heart failure and wants to be turned into a vampire to survive, but Cassidy declines. While Tulip suffers from nightmares about the Saint of Killers, Jesse has second thoughts about having sacrificed part of his soul for his friends and discusses the matter with a street preacher. Herr Starr is given the information on his phone that his next target is Jesse.
18	8	"Holes"	Maja Vrvilo	Mark Stegemann	August 7, 2017	1.15
In Hell, the superintendent announces that the reason for the power outages is due to the presence of a person who is not supposed to be there, and vows to find the culprit. Hitler suspects that it is Eugene and tricks him to help another prisoner. For his good deed, Eugene is thrown into the "Hole" as punishment, where he is shown an intensified, fabricated memory of Tracy promising herself to God and masturbating Jesse, leading again to his attempted suicide with the shotgun. When Eugene returns to the others, Hitler offers to help him escape. Meanwhile in New Orleans, Denis' health deteriorates, and he insists that Cassidy makes him a vampire. Jesse has the audition tape analyzed: the serial number of the gun in the video has been filed off and no other clues surface. When Tulip has a new refrigerator installed at the apartment, she follows the holes left by the bullet of the Saint of Killers to the adjacent apartments and finds Lara Featherstone, an agent of Herr Starr who has been surveying Jesse, masquerading as a demure victim of domestic abuse. On a phone call, Cassidy asks someone called Seamus for advice on how to handle Denis, and he is advised not to turn him into a vampire.
19	9	"Puzzle Piece"	Michael Dowse	Craig Rosenberg	August 14, 2017	0.99
The agents of the Grail discover evidence of Jesse's power, but Herr Starr, uninterested, orders them to kill Jesse. After a Grail SWAT team fails, Herr Starr is advised to activate "B.R.A.D." in order to complete the task. During the fight with the soldiers, it is revealed that Cassidy has indeed turned Denis into a vampire. While B.R.A.D. is readied, Herr Starr starts to take an interest in Jesse, after finding out that he is searching for God. B.R.A.D., revealed to be a combat drone, has been activated and is about to destroy Denis' apartment with a missile, when Herr Starr calls the mission off, having found something of interest in Jesse's file. The missile destroys Harry Connick Jr.'s house instead, killing the singer. Herr Starr meets Jesse at a bar and offers help in the quest for God.
20	10	"Dirty Little Secret"	Steph Green	Mary Laws	August 21, 2017	1.03
Lara Featherstone worms her way into Tulip's confidence in order to make mischief. Cassidy bonds with his son, who appears to have no control over his vampire desires. Jesse repeatedly uses his powers on Herr Starr to make him reveal the true nature of the Grail. He learns that it was the Grail who hired and killed the God imposter. However, it becomes clear that neither the organization nor the Christian religious leaders know God's whereabouts. Later, Jesse meets the latest descendant of Jesus Christ. He is nicknamed Humperdoo, and has an intellectual disability due to inbreeding which makes him unfit to fulfill the role of the new Messiah. Herr Starr suggests that Jesse should use his powers to fill the gap left by God's absence, which Jesse declines, relying on his friends. Meanwhile, Herr Starr wants to be the one to help Jesse find God so he orchestrates Tulip's discovery of the Saint of Killers' weapons that Jesse had buried under Denis' apartment, in order to cause strife between Jesse and his friends.
21	11	"Backdoors"	Norberto Barba	Sara Goodman	August 28, 2017	0.90
In flashbacks, a teenage Jesse is submerged in a swamp, locked inside a coffin, by his grandmother L'Angelle to break his will. In the present, when Jesse and Tulip have the armored truck raised from the swamp, the Saint of Killers seems to have disappeared, leading to tensions within the group. Herr Starr reveals to his agents his plan to replace the Messiah with Jesse. Jesse has an intuition that the man in the dog costume might have been the Almighty after all. However, when he returns to that place, the person is no longer there. Tulip tries to have the weapons of the Saint melted down, but they cannot be destroyed. So she then sends them to Brazil by mail. After playing a recording of Jesse's prayers to him, including the one where he begged for his father's death, Herr Starr repeats his offer to Jesse of taking over God's job, which Jesse declines again. As a consequence, it is revealed that the armored truck has been swapped by the Grail, and the Saint of Killers is released by an operative. In Hell, after having seen Hitler's worst memory of his last day as a good person, Eugene accepts his help to escape and they enter the "Hole" to find a backdoor together.
22	12	"On Your Knees"	Michael Slovis	Sam Catlin & Rachel Wagner	September 4, 2017	1.10
In Hell, Hitler tells Eugene that he must prove he does not belong there in order to find the backdoor. When he does, they can escape through a shaft. In a flashback, it is shown how the Grail secured the cooperation of the Saint of Killers by freeing him of his new soul, thus restoring his powers. Meanwhile, Jesse declares that he does not want to think about God anymore. When the Saint of Killers attacks Jesse and his friends, he is stopped by the superintendent from Hell. She takes him with her, telling Jesse that he is fortunate to have Herr Starr on his side. Back in Hell, the Saint demands to meet Satan. The ambulance that Jesse uses to take his friends to the hospital belongs to the Grail and brings Tulip and Cassidy to Herr Starr, who reveals his plans for Jesse to them, telling them that Jesse does not really care for them. After watching the news on TV, in which the Pope announces God's disappearance and the coming of the Messiah (Humperdoo), Jesse draws the conclusion that he has no other choice but to take over God's job. He calls on Herr Starr, who then kneels before him.
23	13	"The End of the Road"	Wayne Yip	Sam Catlin	September 11, 2017	0.97
In a flashback, a teenage Jesse steals money from tourists in Angelville and is bullied by his grandmother's henchmen. In the present, Jesse holds his first filmed speech as the new Messiah in front of a school class, when armed Armenians storm the room. Herr Starr tells him that the attack had been staged and that the video is going viral. When Genesis does not work to save Tulip, Jesse prevents Cassidy from turning her into a vampire, leading to her death.

=== Season 3 (2018) ===
No. overall	No. in season	Title	Directed by	Written by	Original release date	U.S. viewers (millions)
24	1	"Angelville"	Michael Slovis	Sam Catlin	June 24, 2018	0.84
In a flashback, Jesse's mother tries to run from her own mother Madame L'Angelle, who is a Voodoo witch, but is stopped by her mother's henchmen T.C. and Jody. When she swallows a photograph of baby Jesse, Marie L'Angelle retrieves it by cutting open her stomach and leaving her to die. In the present, Jesse and Cassidy arrive at Angelville with Tulip's body looking for Jesse's grandmother. Jesse implores her to bring Tulip back from death promising to do anything she wants. She sends Jesse and Cassidy on an errand to procure the things she needs for the ritual. Jesse has to go to the rival Boyd clan with Jody, the man who killed his father, to retrieve transpoil. Meanwhile, in Purgatory, Tulip is placed back into scenes from her traumatic childhood alongside a version of her from this time. When Gran'ma L'Angelle is alone with Cassidy and Tulip's body, she offers him a favor for returning Jesse home. After having violently obtained the transpoil, Gran'ma can coax Tulip back to life. On her way back Tulip meets God (Man Dog), who tells her that she is part of His big scheme. Later, when his grandmother reminds Jesse of his promise, he tells her that he might cheat and kill her instead. She answers that he could try and see what happens.
25	2	"Sonsabitches"	Michael Slovis	Sara Goodman	July 1, 2018	0.77
In a flashback, a teenage Jesse helps Jody and T.C. to rope in a customer, who failed to pay for a spell. As a consequence his grandmother takes the man's soul away. In the present, Tulip tells Cassidy and Jesse that she was shot by the female Grail agent. While Cassidy wants revenge right away, Jesse presses his friends to focus on escaping Gran'ma first, leading to further tension. He contacts Herr Starr, and demands his soul fragment back in hope to regain his powers. As a diversion, he stages an attack of the Boyd clan on Angelville, while he meets Herr Starr. The handover fails when Tulip remembers God telling her to "get those sonsabitches" and assaults the Grail agents. However, Herr Starr gets away and leaves Jesse to deal with his family. Gran'ma L'Angelle punishes Jesse for trying to double-cross her using witchcraft. On her orders, Jesse enters a cellar labeled as "The Tombs", where he finds the customer chained to the wall.
26	3	"Gonna Hurt"	John Grillo	Gary Tieche	July 8, 2018	0.77
When Tulip drives to the New Orleans office of the Grail, she finds the premises deserted. On her way back, she meets God on the road, who tells her that He wanted her to fail as part of His plan, and that He is on Earth to prepare some test. She does not believe Him, accuses Him of being on Earth aimlessly and promises to "kick His ass". Because T.C. is getting suspicious of Cassidy's healing capacities, Jesse tries to make up with his friend and warn him about Angelville, but Cassidy will not listen. While Jesse is away with Jody trying to recruit new customers for his grandmother, T.C. explains to Tulip about blood-debt compacts, and Cassidy asks Gran'ma L'Angelle for a love spell. Meanwhile, Tulip seeks out Madame Sabina Boyd for help to break Jesse's compact. When Jody and T.C. find out that Cassidy is a vampire, they hang him upside-down from a tree, planning to kill him by sunlight. Jesse intervenes by finally agreeing to re-open the Tombs and to arrange a fight between Cassidy and the customer locked there, acting as master of ceremonies.
27	4	"The Tombs"	Wayne Yip	Mark Stegemann	July 15, 2018	0.75
Tulip tries to force Madame Boyd to reveal how to break Gran'ma's spell, and she escapes with Boyd as hostage. Cassidy wins his fight. Jesse chops Cassidy into pieces and tries to ship him in a parcel. However, Cassidy returns to the ring to fight Jesse, ending with Jesse stabbing him with a stake just as Tulip shows up. Jesse and Tulip make up, and she sends Cassidy off on a bus to New Orleans. Madame Boyd tells Tulip that she must kill Gran'ma to break the compact.
28	5	"The Coffin"	Millicent Shelton	Mary Laws	July 22, 2018	0.82
Tulip is not able to shoot Gran'ma in her sleep. When T.C. and Jody find out that Cassidy has escaped, they capture Jesse and Tulip and lock him in a coffin submerged in a pond. Meanwhile, Herr Starr oversees Humperdoo's preparations for being revealed as the Messiah. Herr Starr is not impressed by Humperdoo's performance, but his superior, the Allfather, orders him to speed up the process, when Lara Featherstone makes a suggestion how to force Jesse to rejoin the Grail. At the same time, Cassidy tries to meet other vampires in New Orleans. After Tulip breaks away from Jody, she strangles Gran'ma in self-defense, but drops dead afterwards, because her life is linked to the old woman's. Jesse, who has managed to escape from the coffin, can resuscitate Marie L'Angelle, thus reviving Tulip as well. As the Grail stages a fake video message from Cassidy begging Jesse to rescue him from their grasp, cloaked figures storm the room. Jesse tells Tulip that Madame Boyd tricked her in killing Gran'ma knowing it would kill herself as well. When T.C. claims that Gran'ma needs to devour a soul in order to recuperate, a fight starts. In New Orleans, Cassidy meets the Children of Blood.
29	6	"Les Enfants du Sang"	Laura Belsey	Rachel Wagner	July 29, 2018	0.78
After Eugene finds out that Annville has been destroyed and its population killed, he is put in an orphanage but is immediately adopted by the Saint of Killers. Eccarius is revealed as a real vampire who wants Cassidy as a companion. In order to prevent T.C. from taking Tulip's soul, Jesse offers to steal Madame Boyd's storage. They rob the bank and feed all the souls to Gran'ma. Jesse promises to pay his debt to his grandmother and decides to call the Grail. Herr Starr meets the Allfather, who tells him of his plans to destroy the world in preparation for the second coming of the Messiah.
30	7	"Hilter"	Michael Morris	Carla Ching	August 5, 2018	0.88
Hitler works at a fast food sandwich place under an alias, planning a fascist revolution, when the Saint of Killers shows up with Eugene and takes him away in chains. Gran'ma demands more souls. Starr agrees to obtain souls from the Japanese soul dealing company. Marie L'Angelle consents, but threatens to kill Jesse if Starr doesn't follow through. Cassidy befriends Eccarius and takes part in his scheme with the Children of Blood. Starr orders his operative Hoover to continue the hunt for Cassidy.
31	8	"The Tom/Brady"	Wayne Yip	Mary Laws & Kevin Rosen	August 12, 2018	0.94
Grail scientists extract Genesis from Jesse's body and transfer it to a Humperdoo clone. Marie L'Angelle negotiates with Satan to deliver Tulip to him instead. Cassidy and Eccarius capture Hoover and turn him into a vampire. Tulip, Lara Featherstone and Jody rob the vault of the soul dealing company in Osaka.
32	9	"Schwanzkopf"	Kevin Hooks	Gary Tieche	August 19, 2018	0.98
Jesse manages to transfer Genesis into the Allfather, causing him to explode before returning to Jesse. He fights successfully with Herr Starr for the vial containing his soul fragment, and gets his powers back. When Starr explains to him that the Allfather has already set in motion a plan to destroy the world and put Humperdoo in charge, Jesse wants to kill Humperdoo, but is not able to shoot him. Instead, he releases him along with all remaining clones, making it impossible to identify the real one, and then he departs back to Angelville. As Starr finds out that Hoover has been turned into a vampire, he is enraged at Jesse. When Cassidy refuses to go along with Eccarius' spree, he is seized by the other vampire, who threatens to kill him. Before Sydney enters the bus to Hell with the others, Tulip walks up to her and persuades her to give her the suitcase full of souls. However, she is exposed by Eugene, and Sydney forces Tulip to enter the bus, while Featherstone and Jody leave with the suitcase. During the ride to Hell, the bus is ambushed by neo-Nazis. When T.C. tells Marie L'Angelle that Jesse has not shown up yet, she answers that Jesse will come back to kill her.
33	10	"The Light Above"	Sam Catlin	Sam Catlin	August 26, 2018	1.02
Jesse beats Jody in mortal combat at the Tombs, before burning the place down, with T.C. choosing to die in the flames. Jesse orders Gran'ma to release him and Tulip from her spells. Tulip, Sydney, and the Saint of Killers fight the neo-Nazis trying to rescue Hitler. God offers to bless Tulip's family if she persuades Jesse to stop looking for him. Tulip declines and escapes. Hitler takes the devil's seat and the Saint departs from Hell with Eugene. Cassidy convinces the Children of Blood that Eccarius has killed his former victims, so they turn against their leader and devour him. Cassidy is captured and brought to Masada, the Grail headquarters, where Starr kills Hoover.

=== Season 4 (2019) ===
No. overall	No. in season	Title	Directed by	Written by	Original release date	U.S. viewers (millions)
34	1	"Masada"	John Grillo	Sam Catlin & Kevin Rosen	August 4, 2019	0.62
Tulip and Cassidy meet in a hotel room, where they talk about death and kiss. In Australia, Jesse mortally falls from the sky. A few months earlier in the Middle East, Jesse and Tulip manage to invade Masada, where Cassidy is being held captive by the Grail. Cassidy is in a cell with an outcast Archangel and is tortured by an American mobster called Frank Toscani, who teaches "advanced torture" at the "University of the Grail." Herr Starr loses an ear in the ensuing fight with Jesse. However, Cassidy refuses to leave Masada, seemingly because of a quarrel with Jesse over Tulip. Meanwhile, the Saint of Killers and Eugene Root are still searching for Jesse in the United States. Jesse has some nightmares in which he sees an atomic explosion at a phallic rock formation, his dead father calls him on the phone and tells him to start looking for God again, and he tries to strangle Tulip. As a result he departs the same night, leaving Tulip behind. Herr Starr confers with God, and together they decide to make Jesse suffer.
35	2	"Last Supper"	John Grillo	Gary Tieche	August 4, 2019	0.62
Herr Starr is promoted to Allfather. The New Zealand deputy prime minister is executed for asking about the revelation of the Messiah. Posing as an injured Grail agent, Tulip cheats her way into Masada. Jesse learns that the rock formation he has seen in his dream is in Australia.
36	3	"Deviant"	Kevin Hooks	Sara Goodman	August 11, 2019	0.55
Back in Masada, the Archangel wonders why Cassidy doesn't struggle anymore. Cassidy thinks back to when he was an Irish rebel during the Easter Rising. Eugene finds out that the Saint of Killers plans to murder Jesse. Eugene is arrested by the vice squad. The Saint shoots the policeman as they drive off. At the brothel, Jesse single-handedly beats all the clients in a fight. He meets Adolf Hitler, who tells him that Satan is dead and that he would like Jesse to join him in Hell. As he finds out that he is wanted for the carnage at the brothel, Jesse's plane is about to crash on its flight to Australia.
37	4	"Search and Rescue"	Kevin Hooks	Mark Stegemann	August 18, 2019	0.54
In a meeting, God assures Herr Starr that his great plan is at work and asks him about Humperdoo, who is still missing. Jesse and the pilot survive as the plane ditches in a thunderstorm at sea. In spite of his powers, he can't keep the pilot from dying of some severe injuries, but reaches the Australian coast in a life raft. Jesse gets more enraged with God. When Cassidy is rolled to the helipad, Hitler arrives at Masada for a conference of Heaven and Hell. Using an angel's feather, Cassidy breaks free, killing his guards and Frank. Just as he is about to reunite with Tulip, he is arrested by Featherstone. Being mistaken for a Grail agent, Tulip is assigned as a valet to Jesus Christ, who is the celestial emissary and senses that she is in trouble. She teams up with him to free Cassidy from the dungeons. When they finally get to his cell, they find that he has escaped with the help of the Archangel. Jesus wants to join Tulip in her continuing search for Cassidy. While Hitler discovers Humperdoo and his tap-dancing abilities, the Saint of Killers creates a hole through the center of the Earth to get to Australia with Eugene.
38	5	"Bleak City"	Jonathan Watson	Susan Hurwitz Arneson	August 25, 2019	0.53
Jesse tries to make his way to the rock formation from his dream. Tulip and Jesus walk into Kamal's bar and motel to find Cassidy. Jesus is reluctant to play his part in the Apocalypse and to leave Humperdoo in the role of the Messiah. The Archangel tries to persuade Cassidy to take his chances with Tulip, something the vampire dismisses. Jesus returns to Masada for the conference with Hitler, and Tulip reunites with Cassidy to follow Jesse, who faces the Saint.
39	6	"The Lost Apostle"	Jonathan Watson	Gary Tieche	September 1, 2019	0.45
God calls Herr Starr and orders him to initiate phase 2. Tulip and Cassidy arrive in Australia and start looking for Jesse. While political tensions grow between New Zealand and Australia, a truck with the New Zealand coat of arms, carrying an atomic bomb, arrives at the Lost Apostle national park. Because he lost Humperdoo and lied about it, God makes a dingo rip off Starr's genitalia, before he forces Jesse to fall to his death from the plane.
40	7	"Messiahs"	Iain B. MacDonald	Mark Stegemann	September 8, 2019	0.53
Jesse ends up in Hell. Tulip and Cassidy seek the help of Dany in exchange for killing her husband. She leads them to the real Humperdoo, who hides inside a synagogue at Jesse's request. They take Humperdoo with them in order to take revenge on God. Jesus, still negotiating with Hell, meets a Humperdoo clone, who is shot by Hitler. He suggests that Jesus should take up the role, which he declines. Lara Featherstone kills Hoover 2, an undercover cop, just as he is about to report the Grail's conspiracy to his superior.
41	8	"Fear of the Lord"	Iain B. MacDonald	Wes Brown	September 15, 2019	0.45
Herr Starr is rescued by Lara Featherstone from the cannibals who picked him up, installed a faucet to his bladder and amputated a leg for food. He is so desperate that he tries to commit suicide, but fails. Finally God tells him where to find Humperdoo. So when the Grail snatches the Messiah from Tulip and Cassidy and return him to Masada, Starr‘s beauty is restored, and a date is set for the Apocalypse. Meanwhile, in spite of being tortured in Hell, Jesse still refuses to sit on God‘s throne. When the Almighty resurrects Jesse from his grave, the two finally meet. God tells Jesse that he failed the test, simply because he was tempted to accept the angels‘ offer, which enrages Jesse. Then God bites out one of Jesse‘s eyes, invites him to the Apocalypse, and sends him back to reunite with his friends, who have returned to the Middle East.
42	9	"Overture"	Laura Belsey	Carolyn Townsend	September 22, 2019	0.51
While the Grail has started the one hour variety show that will culminate in Humperdoo doing his tap dance to initiate the Apocalypse, Jesse and his friends sneak into Masada with the help of the Archangel and the Demon, who are the parents of Genesis. As they try to locate the Messiah, they get separated. God tries to tempt both Cassidy and Tulip ending with the vampire being dismembered and disemboweled, and Tulip trapped in an office. After Herr Starr and Lara Featherstone have sex, she learns that Starr selfishly plans to kill just the people who stand in his way instead of all human kind. However, Hoover 2 didn't get to pass on these new orders. Starr rushes to fix that in the last minute, but has trouble with the fax machine. Featherstone, who has been hoping to enter Heaven after Last Judgment, frees Tulip in order to stop Starr. Hitler offers Jesus to kill Humperdoo for him, but Jesus eventually backpedals. When Eugene is released from prison, he is run down by a taxi. God faces Jesse alone and demands Genesis from him. Even so, Jesse will not give it up, but wants God to take it, which he seems unable to do. Jesse makes the Saint of Killers appear, but the cowboy has a deal with God to go for the preacher instead.
43	10	"End of the World"	Sam Catlin	Sam Catlin	September 29, 2019	0.51
As the TV show nears its end and Grail agents infiltrate nuclear strike bases, Humperdoo gets stage fright. Jesse fights the Saint of Killers with the help of the Archangel and the Demon, who both get killed, while Jesus strangles Hitler. When Tulip arrives backstage, Cassidy won't let her kill Humperdoo, so they start fighting. Lara Featherstone challenges Starr, who murders her. Jesse persuades the Saint not to finish him, but to let him execute the cowboy. Cassidy comes to his senses and shoots Humperdoo, thus preventing Apocalypse. God offers the role of Messiah to Jesus, but when His son declines, God decides to run away. Jesse announces that Apocalypse is cancelled, then uses Genesis to order the Grail to hunt down God. Eugene has survived the car accident and starts a promising career as a street singer. Two years later, Jesse and Tulip have a baby daughter, when the Grail has finally located God at the Alamo. Jesse faces Him there and learns that Genesis has power over God as well. They chat, but when God tells him that everything that happened was a display of His affection and wants Jesse to love Him back, Jesse tells God that the world is better off without Him. He releases Genesis and walks away. When God returns to Heaven, the Saint awaits Him, having made a deathbed confession. The Saint kills God and sits down on His throne, finally able to rest forever. Forty years later, Cassidy meets Jesse's and Tulip's daughter Lucy at the graves of her parents. After their talk, Cassidy commits suicide by walking into the sunlight.

== Ratings ==
=== Season 1 ===
Viewership and ratings per episode of List of Preacher episodes
No.	Title	Air date	Rating (18–49)	Viewers (millions)	DVR (18–49)	DVR viewers (millions)	Total (18–49)	Total viewers (millions)
1	"Pilot"	May 22, 2016	0.9	2.38	0.8	1.83	1.7	4.21
2	"See"	June 5, 2016	0.8	2.08	0.8	1.71	1.6	3.78
3	"The Possibilities"	June 12, 2016	0.7	1.75	0.7	1.62	1.4	3.38
4	"Monster Swamp"	June 19, 2016	0.4	1.14	0.7	1.38	1.1	2.52
5	"South Will Rise Again"	June 26, 2016	0.5	1.43	0.6	1.48	1.1	2.91
6	"Sundowner"	July 3, 2016	0.5	1.49	—N/a	—N/a	—N/a	—N/a
7	"He Gone"	July 10, 2016	0.6	1.55	—N/a	1.58	—N/a	3.13
8	"El Valero"	July 17, 2016	0.6	1.65	0.7	1.53	1.3	3.18
9	"Finish the Song"	July 24, 2016	0.6	1.57	—N/a	—N/a	—N/a	—N/a
10	"Call and Response"	July 31, 2016	0.6	1.72	—N/a	—N/a	—N/a	—N/a

=== Season 2 ===
Viewership and ratings per episode of List of Preacher episodes
No.	Title	Air date	Rating (18–49)	Viewers (millions)	DVR (18–49)	DVR viewers (millions)	Total (18–49)	Total viewers (millions)
1	"On the Road"	June 25, 2017	0.6	1.69	0.6	1.41	1.2	3.11
2	"Mumbai Sky Tower"	June 26, 2017	0.4	1.35	—N/a	—N/a	—N/a	—N/a
3	"Damsels"	July 3, 2017	0.4	1.11	—N/a	—N/a	—N/a	—N/a
4	"Viktor"	July 10, 2017	0.4	1.19	0.5	1.15	0.9	2.34
5	"Dallas"	July 17, 2017	0.4	1.27	0.4	1.12	0.8	2.39
6	"Sokosha"	July 24, 2017	0.4	1.19	—N/a	—N/a	—N/a	—N/a
7	"Pig"	July 31, 2017	0.5	1.25	0.4	1.18	0.9	2.43
8	"Holes"	August 7, 2017	0.4	1.15	0.4	1.06	0.8	2.21
9	"Puzzle Piece"	August 14, 2017	0.4	0.99	0.4	1.25	0.8	2.25
10	"Dirty Little Secret"	August 21, 2017	0.3	1.03	0.4	1.08	0.7	2.11
11	"Backdoors"	August 28, 2017	0.3	0.90	0.4	1.00	0.7	1.90
12	"On Your Knees"	September 4, 2017	0.3	1.10	—N/a	—N/a	—N/a	—N/a
13	"The End of the Road"	September 11, 2017	0.4	0.97	0.4	0.96	0.7	1.94

=== Season 3 ===
Viewership and ratings per episode of List of Preacher episodes
No.	Title	Air date	Rating (18–49)	Viewers (millions)	DVR (18–49)	DVR viewers (millions)	Total (18–49)	Total viewers (millions)
1	"Angelville"	June 24, 2018	0.2	0.83	0.3	0.88	0.5	1.72
2	"Sonsabitches"	July 1, 2018	0.2	0.77	0.2	0.70	0.4	1.47 (Note: Live +7 ratings were not available, so Live +3 ratings have been used instead.)
3	"Gonna Hurt"	July 8, 2018	0.2	0.77	0.3	0.71	0.5	1.48
4	"The Tombs"	July 15, 2018	0.2	0.75	0.4	0.89	0.6	1.64
5	"The Coffin"	July 22, 2018	0.3	0.82	0.3	0.83	0.6	1.65
6	"Les Enfants du Sang"	July 29, 2018	0.2	0.78	0.3	0.82	0.5	1.60
7	"Hilter"	August 5, 2018	0.3	0.88	0.2	0.65	0.5	1.53
8	"The Tom/Brady"	August 12, 2018	0.3	0.94	0.3	0.80	0.6	1.74
9	"Schwanzkopf"	August 19, 2018	0.3	0.98	0.3	0.86	0.6	1.84
10	"The Light Above"	August 26, 2018	0.3	1.02	0.3	0.78	0.6	1.80

=== Season 4 ===
Viewership and ratings per episode of List of Preacher episodes
No.	Title	Air date	Rating (18–49)	Viewers (millions)	DVR (18–49)	DVR viewers (millions)	Total (18–49)	Total viewers (millions)
1	"Masada"	August 4, 2019	0.2	0.62	—N/a	0.64	—N/a	1.26
2	"Last Supper"	August 4, 2019	0.2	0.62	—N/a	0.64	—N/a	1.26
3	"Deviant"	August 11, 2019	0.1	0.55	0.2	0.65	0.3	1.20
4	"Search and Rescue"	August 18, 2019	0.1	0.54	0.2	0.63	0.3	1.17
5	"Bleak City"	August 25, 2019	0.1	0.53	0.1	0.45	0.2	0.98
6	"The Lost Apostle"	September 1, 2019	0.1	0.45	0.1	0.53	0.2	0.98
7	"Messiahs"	September 8, 2019	0.1	0.53	0.1	0.43	0.2	0.96
8	"Fear of the Lord"	September 15, 2019	0.1	0.45	0.1	0.46	0.2	0.91
9	"Overture"	September 22, 2019	0.1	0.51	0.1	0.44	0.2	0.95
10	"End of the World"	September 29, 2019	0.1	0.51	0.2	0.56	0.3	1.07

=== Overview ===
Preacher : U.S. viewers per episode (millions)

Season	Episode number													Average
Season	1	2	3	4	5	6	7	8	9	10	11	12	13	Average
1	2.38	2.08	1.75	1.14	1.43	1.49	1.55	1.65	1.57	1.72	–			1.60
2	1.69	1.35	1.11	1.19	1.27	1.19	1.25	1.15	0.99	1.03	0.90	1.10	0.97	1.16
3	0.83	0.77	0.77	0.75	0.82	0.78	0.88	0.94	0.98	1.02	–			0.85
4	0.62	0.62	0.55	0.54	0.53	0.45	0.53	0.45	0.51	0.51	–			0.53

Audience measurement performed by Nielsen Media Research

== Critical reception ==
The first season received largely positive reviews from critics. Review aggregation website Rotten Tomatoes gave the season an approval rating of 89%, based on 243 reviews, with an average rating of 7.55/10. The site's critical consensus states: "A thrilling celebration of the bizarre, Preacher boasts enough gore, glee, and guile to make this visually stunning adaptation a must-see for fans of the comic and newcomers alike". Metacritic, which uses a weighted average, found that the first season received "generally favorable reviews" with a score of 76 out of 100, based on 37 critics. Eric Goldman of IGN gave the pilot episode an 8.8/10, praising the "great mixture of comic and horror elements" and the "excellent casting", particularly praising Ruth Negga's performance as Tulip.

The second season received generally positive reviews from critics. On Rotten Tomatoes, the season has an approval rating of 91%, based on 179 reviews, with an average rating of 7.65/10. The site's critical consensus states: "Preacher's sophomore season benefits from more focused storytelling, without sacrificing any of its gorgeous, violent, insane fun". On Metacritic, the series again received "generally favorable reviews" with a score of 76 out of 100 for the second season, based on 9 critics.

The third season received generally favorable reviews from critics. On Rotten Tomatoes, the season has an approval rating of 92%, based on 91 reviews, with an average rating of 7.7/10. The site's critical consensus states: "Preacher returns to its delightful debauchery, but with a steadier hand and better balance, elevating the drama without taking the edge off". On IGN, Jesse Scheeden gave the season premiere a score of 8.7 out of 10 and claimed that "Preacher is finally venturing into one of the best and most unsettling pieces of the comic, and so far the new season seems to be headed in the right direction. 'Angelville' succeeds in telling a somber, focused story, one that establishes the relationship between Jesse and his grandmother and making our heroes feel more vulnerable than ever".

On Rotten Tomatoes, the fourth season has an approval rating of 77%, based on 74 reviews, with an average rating of 7.2/10. The site's critical consensus states: "Preacher returns as creatively violent, bloody, and profane as ever, but it seems to be running out of steam in its final season".
