= The Devil's Double =

- Theatrical release poster
- Directed by: Lee Tamahori
- Screenplay by: Michael Thomas
- Based on: The Devil's Double by Latif Yahia
- Produced by: Paul Breuls; Michael John Fedun; Emjay Rechsteiner; Catherine Vandeleene
- Starring: Dominic Cooper; Ludivine Sagnier
- Cinematography: Sam McCurdy
- Edited by: Luis Carballar
- Music by: Christian Henson
- Production company: Corsan
- Distributed by: A-Film Distribution
- Release dates: 22 January 2011 (Sundance); 29 July 2011 (United States); 1 September 2011 (Netherlands)
- Running time: 108 minutes
- Countries: Belgium; Netherlands
- Language: English
- Budget: $19.1 million
- Box office: $4.8 million

The Devil's Double is a 2011 English-language Dutch-Belgian biographical thriller film directed by Lee Tamahori, written by Michael Thomas, and starring Dominic Cooper in the dual role of Iraqi military commander Uday Hussein and his body double Latif Yahia. It was released on 22 January 2011 at the 2011 Sundance Film Festival and was released in limited theaters in the United States on 29 July 2011 by Lionsgate and Herrick Entertainment to mixed critic reviews.

== Plot ==
In 1987, Latif Yahia, an Iraqi soldier fighting in the Iran–Iraq War, is called to become a "fedai" ("body double" or political decoy) for Uday Hussein, the son of president Saddam. Latif comes from an upper-class family and attended school with Uday, where students would remark on their likeness. He refuses the position. Furious, Uday has him imprisoned and tortured. Latif relents when his family is threatened. Latif undergoes cosmetic surgery to perfect his resemblance to Uday and practises emulating the latter's mannerisms and persona. Latif tries to resist Uday's exorbitant merrymaking and erratic behaviour, at one point fleeing a nightclub to attempt to see his family, who believe that he died in the war. However, he is apprehended by Uday's bodyguards and beaten by Uday. After an appearance at a conference with Kuwaiti leaders, an attempt is made on Uday's (Latif's) life, apparently by a member of a rebel opposition group, possibly a Kurd. The real Uday, though, is more concerned with the Kuwaitis, whom he believes were slant drilling into Iraq's Rumaila oil field. The First Gulf War is launched.

Uday eventually kidnaps a 14-year-old girl and forces her to escort him to a party. (Note: Based on an actual 1988 celebration honoring Egyptian President Hosni Mubarak's wife Suzanne.) There, Uday becomes enraged with Saddam's personal bodyguard Kamel Hana Gegeo. Uday believes that Gegeo facilitated an affair Saddam had, (Note: With Samira Shahbandar.) which devastated his mother. (Note: Sajida Talfah.) Uday is also jealous at the trust Saddam places in Gegeo. When Gegeo passes sarcastic comments about Uday's advances towards the girl and drunkenly fires an AK-47 in the air, Uday butchers him with an electric knife in front of the guests. The next morning, Uday's bodyguards dump the girl's beaten, partially naked body. Furious, Saddam goes to the hospital, where Uday is overdosed on sleeping pills. Saddam beats Uday and nearly castrates him. Only the intervention of a doctor saves him. As the war is in full swing, Latif tries to distance himself from Uday and begins an affair with Sarrab, one of Uday's lovers.

Latif, acting as Uday, is later sent to Basra to rally support among Republican Guard soldiers as Coalition forces take control of the war. At Basra, another attempt is made on Latif's life. Latif nearly loses a finger in the assault, which would mean Uday would have to amputate his own finger to maintain their resemblance. Uday enters a hospital and threatens to slaughter everyone in it if they fail to save his finger. The doctors succeed.

Afterwards, Uday, accompanied by his usual party, crashes a wedding, eventually raping and beating the bride, who then commits suicide. Angry, Latif assaults Uday but is corralled by the latter's bodyguards, who threaten to kill him. Uday stops them. Later, Latif is confronted by the father of the girl Uday killed. Uday overhears them and is outraged by the man's pleas for "justice" and "compassion". Uday orders Latif to kill the man, but Latif refuses and instead slits his own wrists. He is dumped half-dead on his family's front door. After Latif recovers, he confronts Uday at his birthday party. The confrontation escalates to a shootout and Latif escapes in Uday's Mercedes with Sarrab. The two escape to Valletta, but Sarrab, fearing for her daughter in Iraq, calls Uday begging for the chance to return without being harmed. A would-be assassin sent by Uday misses shooting Latif when they arrive on the island. Angered by Sarrab's carelessness, he washes his hands of her. Uday later calls, offering Latif one final chance to return to Iraq, threatening to kill his father if he refuses. Latif's father encourages him not to return and is killed.

Latif returns to Iraq to kill Uday, aided by the man whose bride killed herself. They ambush Uday while he is attempting to lure young girls into his Porsche. (Note: This is an adapted version of the attempt on Uday's life made by the 15th Shaaban in 1996.) Although his partner is killed, they wound him severely. One of Uday's bodyguards Ali catches up to Latif as he flees the scene. However, Ali is the guard who Latif could have killed at Uday's birthday party but spared, and the guard extends him the same courtesy.

Latif later lives in Ireland with his wife and their two children. (Note: The film states that he became a hard man to find. In reality, he was readily available for interviews at this time.) Uday is permanently handicapped by the attack but survives until his death at the hands of U.S. forces in 2003.

== Cast ==
- Dominic Cooper as Latif Yahia / Uday Hussein
- Philip Quast as Saddam Hussein / Faoaz
- Mem Ferda as Kamel Hana
- Dar Salim as Azzam Al-Tikriti
- Jamie Harding as Qusay Hussein
- Ludivine Sagnier as Sarrab
- Mimoun Oaïssa as Ali
- Akin Gazi as Saleeh
- Amrita Acharia as Schoolgirl
- Frida Cauchi as Sajida Talfah
- Raad Rawi as Munem
- Khalid Laith as Yassem Al-Helou
- Pano Masti as Said Kammuneh
- Nasser Memarzia as Latif's father
- Tiziana Azzopardi as Latif's sister
- Abner Fabbro as Soldier

== Production ==
A Belgian and Dutch production, the film was shot in Jordan and Malta.

== Reception ==
=== Critical response ===
The film received mixed reviews, though much critical acclaim has been given to Dominic Cooper's dual role. On the review aggregator website Rotten Tomatoes, 54% of 102 critics' reviews are positive, with an average rating of 5.7/10/10. The website's consensus reads: "The Devil's Double has plenty of gangster spectacle and Dominic Cooper ably playing off his dual roles, but this crime epic struggles to balance the fun of bad behavior with the dead serious crimes of its subject." Metacritic, which uses a weighted average, assigned the film a score of 52 out of 100, based on 28 critics, indicating "mixed or average" reviews.

IGN awarded it 3.5 out of 5 and said "certainly a fresh perspective on one of the Middle East's most brutal dictators".

=== Accolades ===
Year	Award	Category	Nominee	Result
2012	38th Saturn Awards	Best Horror or Thriller Film	The Devil's Double	Nominated
2012	38th Saturn Awards	Best Actor	Dominic Cooper	Nominated
