= Commendatori =

- The Sopranos episode
- Episode no.: Season 2 Episode 4
- Directed by: Tim Van Patten
- Written by: David Chase
- Cinematography by: Phil Abraham
- Production code: 204
- Original air date: February 6, 2000
- Running time: 52 minutes

Episode chronology
← Previous "Toodle-Fucking-Oo"	Next → "Big Girls Don't Cry"
- The Sopranos season 2

"Commendatori" is the seventeenth episode of the HBO original series The Sopranos and the fourth of the show's second season. It was written by David Chase and directed by Tim Van Patten, and originally aired on February 6, 2000.

== Starring ==
- James Gandolfini as Tony Soprano
- Lorraine Bracco as Dr. Jennifer Melfi *
- Edie Falco as Carmela Soprano
- Michael Imperioli as Christopher Moltisanti
- Dominic Chianese as Corrado Soprano, Jr.
- Vincent Pastore as Pussy Bonpensiero
- Steven Van Zandt as Silvio Dante
- Tony Sirico as Paulie Gualtieri
- Robert Iler as Anthony Soprano, Jr. *
- Jamie-Lynn Sigler as Meadow Soprano
- Drea de Matteo as Adriana La Cerva *
- David Proval as Richie Aprile *
- Aida Turturro as Janice Soprano
- Nancy Marchand as Livia Soprano*

* = credit only

=== Guest starring ===
- Sofia Milos as Annalisa Zucca
- Louis Lombardi, Jr. as Skip Lipari
- Federico Castelluccio as Furio
- Vittorio Duse as Zi Vittorio
- Toni Kalem as Angie Bonpensiero
- Mike Memphis as Jimmy Bones
- Steven R. Schirripa as Bobby "Bacala" Baccalieri
- Sharon Angela as Rosalie Aprile
- Jay Lynch as Partner
- Emme Shaw as Nurse
- Maureen Van Zandt as Gabriella Dante
- Ciro Maggio as Raffaelle
- Danton Stone as Mr. Sontag
- Melissa Weil as Mrs. Sontag
- Jason Fuchs as Jr. Sontag
- Jessica Peters as Sis Sontag
- Gano Grills as Antonio
- Anthony Alessandro as Waiter
- Frank Caero as Host
- Pina Cutolo as Mother
- Raffaele Giulivo as Camillo
- Antonio Lubrano as Nino
- Rocco Malozzi as Don Vittorio's Assistant
- Guido Palliggiano as Pino
- Alida Tarallo as Prostitute
- Alex Toma as Kid
- Giuseppe Zeno as Tanno
- Riccardo Zinna as Hotel Manager

== Synopsis ==
Tony goes to Naples, with Christopher and Paulie Gualtieri, on business: to negotiate the smuggling of stolen luxury cars to Italy with a local Camorra family distantly related to the Sopranos. Tony's contact there is Furio Giunta, a local mobster who speaks English. Tony learns that Don Vittorio, the elderly boss of the Naples family, is senile; his son-in-law, Mauro Zucca, had been in charge but is now serving life in prison. It is hard for Tony to accept that Annalisa—Vittorio's daughter and Mauro's wife—is the de facto head of the family.

Tony negotiates with Annalisa, naming his price for the cars, asking that Furio be sent to work for him in the U.S. as a zip and that others be sent in the future as he requires. Annalisa scoffs at his proposition. Later, Annalisa comes on to Tony, but he tells her he wishes to keep their relationship professional. He then lowers his price for the cars in exchange for Furio and any subsequent men; she agrees. Meanwhile, Paulie tries to discover his roots only to uncover a distaste for Italy, while Christopher is high on heroin most of the time.

Carmela is resentful that Tony has not taken her to Italy. She has lunch with Rosalie Aprile and Angie Bonpensiero, where Angie shares how unhappy she is that Pussy has returned. Pussy is indifferent to his wife even though she is awaiting the result of a biopsy. Angie admits she has thoughts of suicide and that she intends to divorce him. Carmela later visits Angie and urges her not to break the sacrament of marriage.

While with his FBI handler, Agent Skip Lipari, Pussy runs into Jimmy Bones, a Soprano associate. He and Lipari concoct a cover story, but Pussy is afraid that Jimmy won't believe it. He goes to Jimmy's house and beats him to death with a ball-peen hammer. Pussy then goes home with a bouquet for Angie. She pauses a moment, then beats him with it.

Tony returns home. Carmela is upstairs doing housework. He calls her. She pauses a moment, then goes to greet him.

== First appearances ==
- Furio Giunta: a made man from the Naples Mafia headed by Don Vittorio and Annalisa Zucca. He is sent to the United States after a successful trade between Tony and Annalisa.
- This also marks the first recast appearances of Angie Bonpensiero (Pussy's wife) and Gabriella Dante (Silvio's wife). Previously, both of these characters (although only implied as their wives) appeared very briefly in the season one episodes "The Legend of Tennessee Moltisanti" and "Nobody Knows Anything", played by different actresses.

== Deceased ==
Jimmy Bones: an Elvis impersonator and Mafia associate, whom Big Pussy beats to death with a ball-peen hammer after Bones spots Big Pussy talking with his FBI handler, Skip Lipari.

== Title reference ==
The episode's title is a plural of the Italian language word commendatore, which is an official title in the Order of Merit of the Italian Republic (originally established by the royal House of Savoy). It is rarely used as a respectful greeting, with Tony and his crew being given this greeting in Italy by their hotel concierge, which Paulie hears and then tries to use throughout the episode.

== Connections to past episodes ==
Junior meets with Tony at the doctor's office for an X-ray on his hip after slipping in the shower in "Do Not Resuscitate".

== Music ==
- The song "Con te partirò" by Andrea Bocelli is played three times throughout the episode.
- When Tony is driven to Annalisa Zucca's villa the Napolitano song "Core 'ngrato" is played (without the vocals).
- When Jimmy Bones and Big Pussy are in the store, the song playing in the background is a version of "Perdido."
- Before the dinner in Italy, a portion of the arrangement of the song "Andalucia" by Pink Martini plays.
- The song "Marco Polo" by Jovanotti is briefly played when Christopher is taking heroin for the first time.
- The song "Certamente" by the Italian rock band Madreblu is played when Christopher is taking drugs the second time.
- The song played over the end credits is "Piove" by Jovanotti.

== Production ==
- Series creator and head writer David Chase makes a cameo appearance in the episode as an Italian man, sitting at a cafe with other men. When Paulie says "commendatori" to the table, Chase glances at him indifferently and then turns away.
- Vittorio Duse, who played Zi Vittorio, also played Don Tommasino in the 1990 film The Godfather Part III.

== Filming locations ==
Listed in order of first appearance:

- Lodi, New Jersey
- Naples, Italy
- Monte di Procida, Italy
- Bacoli, Italy
- Newark International Airport
- Route 21 in Belleville, New Jersey
