= Lee Tamahori =

New Zealand film director (1950–2025)

- Tamahori in 2002
- Born: Warren Lee Tamahori; 22 April 1950; Wellington, New Zealand
- Died: 7 November 2025 (aged 75); Auckland, New Zealand
- Education: Tawa College
- Occupation: Film director
- Years active: 1976–2025

Warren Lee Tamahori (/ˌtɑːməˈhɔːri/; 22 April 1950 – 7 November 2025) was a New Zealand film director. His feature directorial debut, Once Were Warriors (1994), was a widespread critical and commercial success. It is considered one of the greatest New Zealand films ever made.

Subsequently, he directed a variety of works both in his native country and in Hollywood, including the neo-noir Mulholland Falls (1996), the survival drama The Edge (1997), the Alex Cross thriller Along Came a Spider (2001), the James Bond film Die Another Day (2002), the political biopic The Devil's Double (2011), and the period dramas Mahana (2016) and The Convert (2023).

He won the New Zealand Film Award for Best Director for Once Were Warriors, with a second nomination for Mahana, and another win for The Convert.

== Early life ==
Tamahori was born in Wellington on 22 April 1950, the son of Piripi and Patricia Tamahori. He was of Māori ancestry on his father's side and British on his mother's. He grew up in Tawa, a northern suburb of Wellington, where he was educated at Tawa School and Tawa College. He began his career as a commercial artist and photographer.

== Career ==
=== Early work ===
Tamahori began working in the film industry in the late 1970s, opening the door to his film career while working for nothing. He worked as a boom operator for Television New Zealand, and on the feature films Skin Deep, Goodbye Pork Pie, Bad Blood, and Race for the Yankee Zephyr.

In the early 1980s, Goodbye Pork Pie director Geoff Murphy promoted Tamahori to assistant director on Utu, and he then worked as first assistant director on The Silent One, Murphy's The Quiet Earth, Came a Hot Friday, and Merry Christmas, Mr. Lawrence. In 1986, Tamahori co-founded the production company Flying Fish, which specialised in making commercials. He made his name with a series of high-profile television commercials, including one for Instant Kiwi which was awarded Commercial of the Decade.

=== Feature films ===
Tamahori had directed a number of shorter dramas for television before he made his feature film debut in 1994 with Once Were Warriors, a gritty depiction of a violent Māori family. The film had problems finding funding, but it went on to break box office records in New Zealand. Overseas it sold to many countries and had very positive reviews from Time, The Village Voice and The Age. Time, The Age and Première named it one of the 10 best films of the year. Tamahori moved to Hollywood and directed the period crime drama Mulholland Falls (1996), which was not received well critically or commercially. That was followed by the successful wilderness film The Edge (1997) and Die Another Day (2002), the twentieth and most successful James Bond film made up until that point. Tamahori also directed an episode of The Sopranos and the thriller Along Came a Spider (2001).

Tamahori's next film was the sequel to XXX (2002), titled XXX: State of the Union (2005); Tamahori replaced the original film's director, Rob Cohen. In 2007, he directed Next, a science fiction action film based on The Golden Man, a short story by Philip K. Dick. The biographical drama The Devil's Double came out in 2011, a dramatisation of Latif Yahia's claims that he was forced to become a body double to Uday Hussein, a son of Saddam Hussein.

In 2012, Tamahori was attached to the action epic Emperor, about a young woman seeking revenge for the execution of her father by Holy Roman Emperor Charles V. The film is unfinished and its release has been held up by legal challenges.

In 2015, Tamahori directed Mahana (aka The Patriarch), his first feature made in New Zealand since Once Were Warriors. The drama, set in a rural area, was based on the novel Bulibasha by Witi Ihimaera. The movie was released in New Zealand in March 2016 after debuting at the Berlin International Film Festival. In 2022, Tamahori directed the historical drama The Convert.

== Personal life ==
Tamahori was married twice and had two sons, one from each marriage.

=== Legal issues ===
In January 2006, Tamahori was arrested on Santa Monica Boulevard in Los Angeles, United States, when according to the Los Angeles Police Department, he entered an undercover policeman's car while wearing a woman's dress and offered to perform a sex act in exchange for money. In February 2006, he pleaded no contest in a Los Angeles court to a charge of criminal trespass in return for prosecutors dropping charges of prostitution and loitering. He was placed on 36 months' probation and ordered to perform 15 days of community service.

=== Death ===
Tamahori died at home in Auckland of complications related to Parkinson's disease on 7 November 2025 at the age of 75.

== Filmography ==
=== Film ===
Year	Title	Notes	Refs.
1989	Thunderbox	Short film	
1994	Once Were Warriors		
1996	Mulholland Falls		
1997	The Edge		
2001	Along Came a Spider		
2002	Die Another Day		
2005	XXX: State of the Union		
2007	Next		
2011	The Devil's Double		
2016	Mahana		
2023	The Convert		

=== Television ===
Year	Title	Episode(s)	Refs.
1990–92	The Ray Bradbury Theater	"Usher II"	
1990–92	The Ray Bradbury Theater	"The Long Rain"	
1990–92	The Ray Bradbury Theater	"Silent Towns"	
2000	The Sopranos	"Toodle-Fucking-Oo"	
2020	Billions	"The Chris Rock Test"	
