= Islamic Movement of the 15th of Shaaban =

The Islamic Movement of the 15th of Shaaban is a secular Iraqi political party based in Nassiriya, southern Iraq.

The Movement is named after the starting date of the 1991 uprisings in Iraq. It was founded by Salman Sharif Duaffar, one of four Shi'ite guerillas who tried to assassinate Uday Hussein in Baghdad in 1996, leaving him crippled. Duaffar's father and seven brothers were killed in revenge and Duaffar fled to Iran.

Duaffar was born in 1969 in Ash Shatrah. His brother, a Major in the Iraqi Army, was killed in the Iran–Iraq War.

Following the invasion of Iraq in 2003, Duaffar was appointed to the Provincial council of Dhi Qar Governorate by the Coalition Provisional Authority. The movement seized an abandoned state-owned hotel as their headquarters.
