= Toodle-Fucking-Oo =

- The Sopranos episode
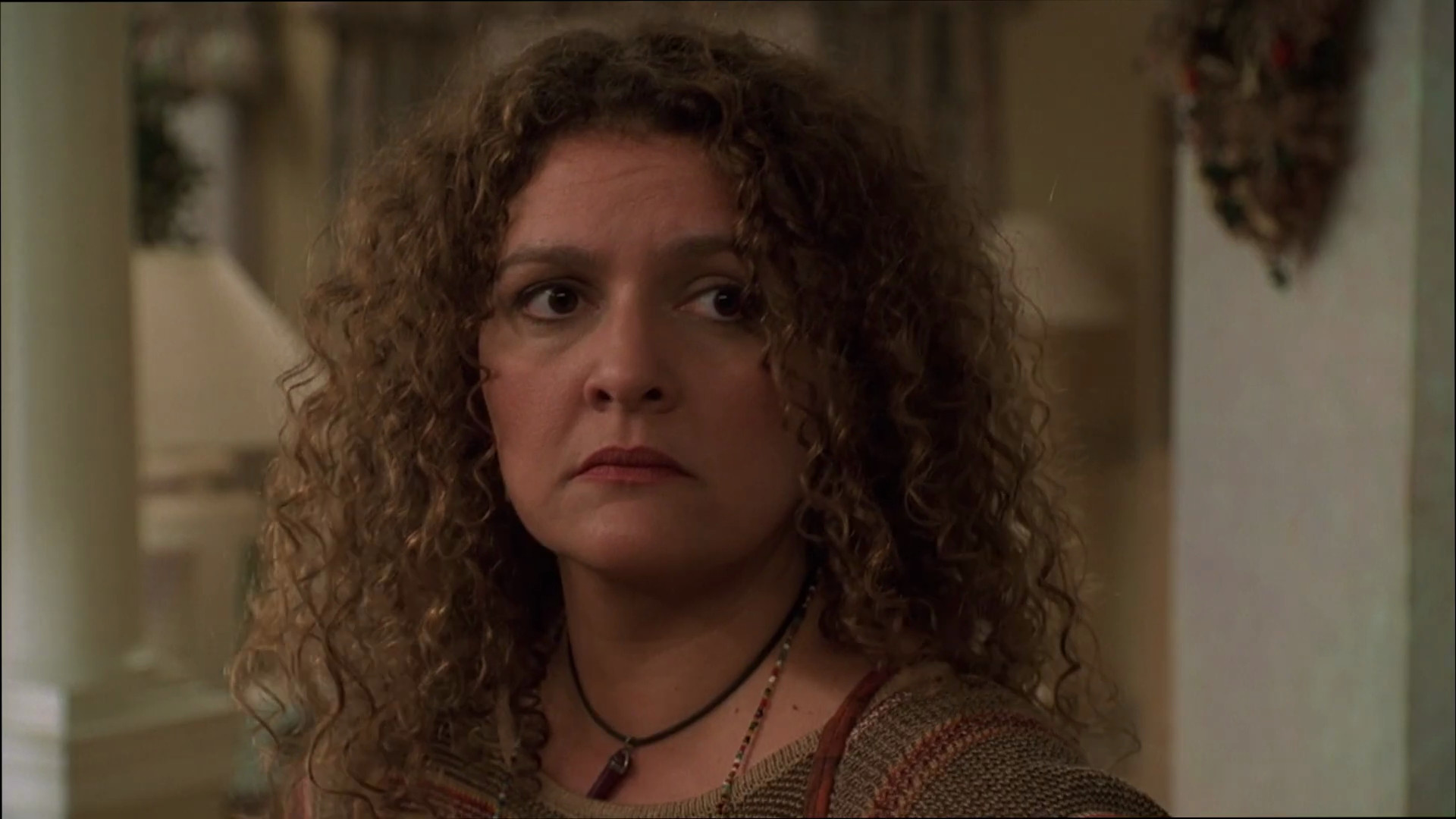
- Janice considers leaving the Soprano house
- Episode no.: Season 2 Episode 3
- Directed by: Lee Tamahori
- Written by: Frank Renzulli
- Cinematography by: Phil Abraham
- Production code: 203
- Original air date: January 30, 2000
- Running time: 50 minutes

Episode chronology
← Previous "Do Not Resuscitate"	Next → "Commendatori"
- The Sopranos season 2

"Toodle-Fucking-Oo" is the sixteenth episode of the HBO original series The Sopranos and the third of the show's second season. It was written by Frank Renzulli, directed by Lee Tamahori, and originally aired on January 30, 2000.

== Starring ==
- James Gandolfini as Tony Soprano
- Lorraine Bracco as Dr. Jennifer Melfi
- Edie Falco as Carmela Soprano
- Michael Imperioli as Christopher Moltisanti
- Dominic Chianese as Corrado Soprano Jr.
- Vincent Pastore as Pussy Bonpensiero
- Steven Van Zandt as Silvio Dante
- Tony Sirico as Paulie Gualtieri
- Robert Iler as Anthony Soprano Jr.
- Jamie-Lynn Sigler as Meadow Soprano
- Drea de Matteo as Adriana La Cerva
- David Proval as Richie Aprile
- Aida Turturro as Janice Soprano
- Nancy Marchand as Livia Soprano

=== Guest starring ===
- Peter Bogdanovich as Dr. Elliot Kupferberg
- Matthew Sussman as Dr. Schreck
- Paul Herman as Beansie Gaeta
- Michele de Cesare as Hunter Scangarelo
- Diana Agostini as Miriam
- Getchie Argetsinger as Yoga Instructor
- Leslie Beatty as Nancy
- Ed Crasnick as Comedian
- Vincent Curatola as Johnny Sack
- Catrina Ganey as Nurse
- Marc Freeman Hamm as Party Goer
- Linda Mann as Joint Copper
- Joe Pacheo as Policeman
- Charles Sammarco as Joey
- Antonette Schwartzberg as Beansie's Mother
- Mike Squicciarini as Big Frank
- Donna Smythe as Gia Gaeta
- Deirdre Sullivan as Hospital Patient
- Craig Wojcik as Pizza Kid

== Synopsis ==
Meadow throws a party for a few friends at Livia's house. However, the party spins out of control when a lot of uninvited people show up, leading to drug use and heavy drinking. The police arrive, and an officer who knows Tony contacts him. Tony finds Meadow drunk and drives her home, but he and Carmela do not know how to punish her. She prompts them to take away her credit card for three weeks, while still providing cash for gas. She walks away, smiling to herself.

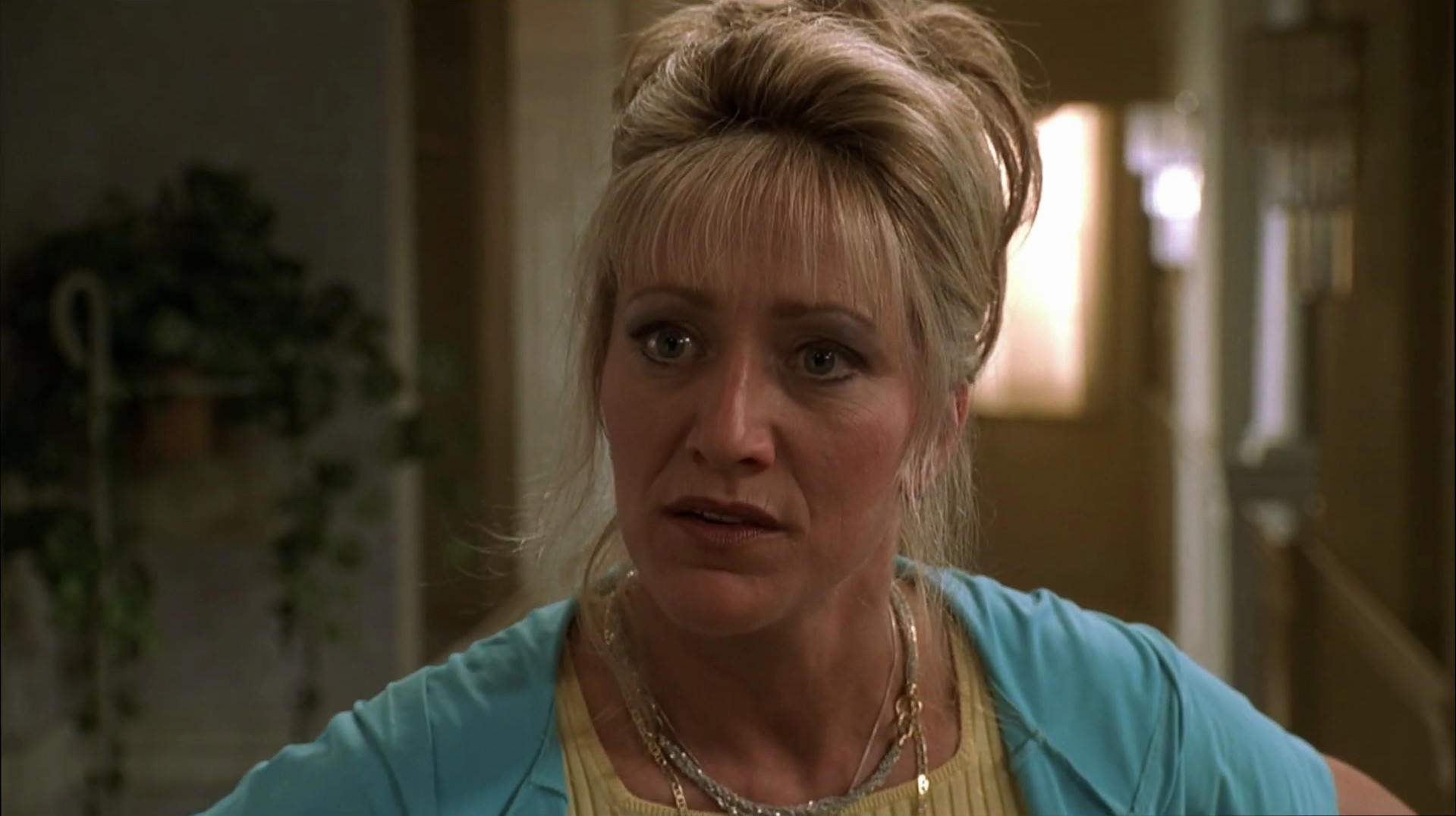
Carmela berating Janice

At first, Janice defends Meadow, saying she is showing her independence, but when she sees the state of the house, she is furious. Tony and Carmela tell her to stop interfering with their parenting. Janice says she ought to leave the Soprano house, but she and Carmela reconcile and she is persuaded to continue to stay. Meadow overhears their argument and, when Tony goes to the house to have the locks changed, he finds her scrubbing the floor. He turns away, perplexed by this remorse.

Jackie Aprile's older brother Richie is released after ten years' imprisonment. He says he has mellowed out by taking up meditation and yoga, but he cannot accept that Tony, a younger man, is now the boss of the DiMeo crime family. Richie also resents that he does not have the same privileges he enjoyed before his imprisonment. When Tony says these things will come in time, Richie says, "What's mine is not yours to give me."

Dr. Melfi becomes tipsy while dining in a restaurant with some female friends. On the way out, she sees Tony at a table with his companions and awkwardly attempts small talk. Leaving, she waves and calls "Toodle-oo!" The men make crude comments about Melfi, and Tony pretends she is an old girlfriend. Melfi is mortified by her own behavior and acknowledges to her therapist, Dr. Elliot Kupferberg, that in order to evade her responsibility as a therapist she behaved like "a ditzy young girl."

Richie demands payments from a former associate, "Beansie" Gaeta, now a pizzeria proprietor. When Beansie refuses, Richie viciously assaults him. Another night, he waits in a parking lot and threatens Beansie with a gun, but he manages to escape. Later, when Beansie returns to his car, Richie rams into him and then drives over him as he lies on the ground. In the hospital, Beansie is told he may never walk again. Tony asserts his authority over Richie and tells him there will be a problem if he does not show respect.

Between the two assaults on Beansie, Richie meets with Uncle Junior and pledges his loyalty to him. Richie happens to meet Janice at a yoga class and begins trying to revive the relationship they had years previously.

== First appearances ==
- Richie Aprile: The late Jackie Aprile Sr.'s older brother, who is paroled from prison after a 10-year sentence.
- Peter "Beansie" Gaeta: a pizzeria owner and Mafia associate of Richie Aprile, Jackie Aprile Sr., and Tony Soprano.
- Dr. Elliot Kupferberg: Dr. Melfi's colleague and psychotherapist.
- Dr. Douglas Schreck: Junior Soprano's cardiologist.

== Title reference ==
- "Toodle-oo" is an informal form of "good-bye". An annoyed Melfi adds her own twist on the saying while mulling over her run-in with Tony.

== Production ==
- David Proval (Richie Aprile) is now billed in the opening credits.
- Proval originally auditioned to play the role of Tony Soprano. He was turned down because creator David Chase felt he looked "too right" for the part.

== Connections to future episodes ==
- When meeting with Tony at the mall, Richie reminds Tony that he helped Tony and Richie's brother Jackie get a "pass" after robbing a card game of DiMeo capo "Feech" La Manna. This is the first reference to a story retold with more detail in later seasons.

== Music ==
- The song played when Tony arrives on the scene of the party at Livia's is "Holla Holla" by Ja Rule.
- The song played while the girls cook in the kitchen is "No Scrubs" by TLC.
- The musical number "Optimistic Voices" from the 1939 classic The Wizard of Oz is heard in a dream Dr. Melfi had.
- The song played during Richie Aprile's homecoming at the Bada Bing and over the end credits is "Viking" by Los Lobos.
- The song played when Carmela and Janice apologize to one another is "Never Miss the Water" by Chaka Khan.
- The song played when Janice arrives at Livia's house is "Prince of Peace" by Pharoah Sanders.

== Filming locations ==
Listed in order of first appearance:

- Verona, New Jersey
- Paterson, New Jersey
- North Caldwell, New Jersey
- Satriale's Pork Store in Kearny, New Jersey
- Garden State Plaza in Paramus, New Jersey
- Satin Dolls in Lodi, New Jersey
- Montclair, New Jersey
- Long Island City, Queens
