= Jamie Harding =

English actor

- Born: 12 June 1979 (age 47); London, England, UK

Jamie Harding (born 12 June 1979) is an English actor best known for his role as 9/11 hijacker Ahmed al-Nami in the 2006 film, United 93.

== Early life and career ==
Harding was born and brought up in London, England to an English father and a Sudanese mother.

Harding has played major roles in several television shows, including Dalziel and Pascoe, Silent Witness and 24Seven, and minor roles in Resident Evil and the acclaimed TV-miniseries, Band of Brothers. He starred in the 2006 film O Jerusalem, and the 2009 film Espion(s) with Guillaume Canet.

== Filmography ==
Year	Title	Role	Notes
2002	Resident Evil	Mail Boy	Uncredited
2006	United 93	Ahmed Al Nami	
2006	O Jerusalem	Amin Chahine	
2009	Espion(s)	Fouad	
2011	The Devil's Double	Qusay Hussein	
