= Babel (newspaper) =

Iraqi newspaper

- بابل Red sharp letters skewed towards left that spells out "Babil" appears as logo of the newspaper
- Type: Political newspaper, Propaganda, Opinion
- Editor: Uday Hussein
- Founded: During the Gulf War in 1991
- Political alignment: Iraqi Ba'athism
- Language: Arabic (regularly); English (occasionally, under title "Iraq Daily")
- Ceased publication: November 2002 (for certainty in 2003)
- Country: Ba'athist Iraq

Babel (Arabic: بابل, lit. "Babylon") was an Iraqi newspaper which was published under the direction of Uday Hussein, the son of Saddam Hussein. It was known for carrying Western reports on Iraq's conflict with the United States and was said to be the most influential newspaper in the country and alongside the television channel Youth TV (Al-Shabab), which aired reports by other Arab channels not usually heard on Iraq's state-run media, it was one of two media administered by Uday Hussein independent from Iraqi authorities.

== History and profile ==
Babel was launched during the Gulf War in 1991. It was one of the newspapers owned by Uday Hussein. He was also the founder of the paper which was published both in Arabic and English.

The newspaper later criticized the government on the Faith Campaign program, arguing that the campaign would undermine Iraq's religiously pluralistic society, and encourage sectarian division, thereby undermining Iraq. The paper argued that Saddam's attempt to gain the support of Islamic fundamentalists was ultimately doomed to fail, as such groups would accept nothing less than strict Islamic law. The paper also published letters critical of the government and security services' tolerance for Iraq's growing Salafist movements. At another point, Babil however joined in railing against the Shi'ites, even referring to them as rafidah, a hateful epithet normally used by ultraconservative Salafis only.

In July 2002 the newspaper published an article by "Abu Hatim" (an alias used by Uday) which claimed that the American administration was planning to strike Iraq and exert political control in the Middle East. It stated the plans "will extend to include everything", "starting from making Jordan an alternative homeland for the Palestinians, "dividing Saudi Arabia into at least three parts and obliterating Bahrain's identity by returning it as part of Persia.

The paper was banned by the then-Iraqi government for one month in November 2002 for unexplained causes.
