= Madreblu =

Italian rock band

Madreblu is an Italian pop rock band from Lodi, Lombardy.

Madreblu was formed in 1995 and consisted of Raffaella Destefano (vocals), Gino Marcelli (piano and keyboards), and Valerio Artusi (keyboards). The band released Prima dell’ Alba in 1997, but Artusi left the band in 1998. Destefano and Marcelli released Necessità in 1999. The duo released L' Equilibrio in 2004. Raffaella Destefano left the Band in 2008 to pursue a career of her own.

The song "Certamente" from Necessità is featured on the album The Sopranos: Peppers and Eggs. The song is briefly heard in the Sopranos episode "Commendatori" (season 2, episode 4), during the second scene in which Christopher is seen to be high from having taken heroin.

== Discography ==
=== Albums ===
- Prima dell'alba (1997)
- Necessità (1999)
- L'equilibrio (2004)
