= Timothy Huang =

American dramatist

Timothy Huang (Traditional Chinese: 黃明展, Pinyin: Hwang Mingtzan) is a Taiwanese American playwright, actor, composer and lyricist. He is the creator of the award-winning one-man musical, The View from Here, the song cycle LINES, and "American Morning", aka Costs of Living, the latter of which won the 2016 Richard Rodgers Award for Musical Theater. He is the third Asian American to win the award since its creation and the first to win as a triple threat composer/lyricist/librettist.

== Biography ==
Huang was born in Philadelphia, Pennsylvania and grew up in Wilmington, Delaware. He attended New York University where he received his BFA in Drama and his MFA in Musical Theatre Writing from the Tisch School of the Arts.

== Relevant works ==
Huang is a 2012 Dramatist Guild Fellow and a member of the BMI Lehman Engel Musical Theatre Workshop Huang is the composer lyricist of the one-man musical, The View from Here, which received its inaugural production at the 2005 New York Musical Theatre Festival, and has since been produced regionally. Its premiere production garnered an Outstanding Actor Male citation for Shonn Wiley at NYMF and its subsequent cast album was listed in TalkinBroadway.com's Sound Advice column under Top Ten Cast Albums of 2006.

Huang is also the composer, lyricist and librettist of the full length musicals And the Earth Moved, which was featured in the inaugural New York Musical Theatre Festival alongside Altar Boyz and title of show, Costs of Living, and LINES: A Song Cycle. Inspired by a true story, Costs of Living received national attention when it was featured in the 2011 ASCAP Musical Theatre Workshop, moderated by Stephen Schwartz. Subsequent to the workshop, Costs of Living won the Richard Rodgers Award, and was also nominated by the Dramatist Guild for the Weston New Musical Award, the American Harmony Prize, and the Fred Ebb Award. It was also juried by Stephen Sondheim for the BMI Master Class Series.

== Actor ==
Huang began acting and singing at an early age, making his debut at age 11 as a school child in a local production of Gian Carlo Menotti's Help, Help, the Globolinks! In New York, Huang originated roles in world premieres of Pan Asian Rep's Shanghai Lil's and Brian Yorkey's Making Tracks as well as a guest starring role on The Sopranos in the episode "Do Not Resuscitate".
