= Latif Yahia =

Iraqi human rights activist, lieutenant, and writer (born 1964)

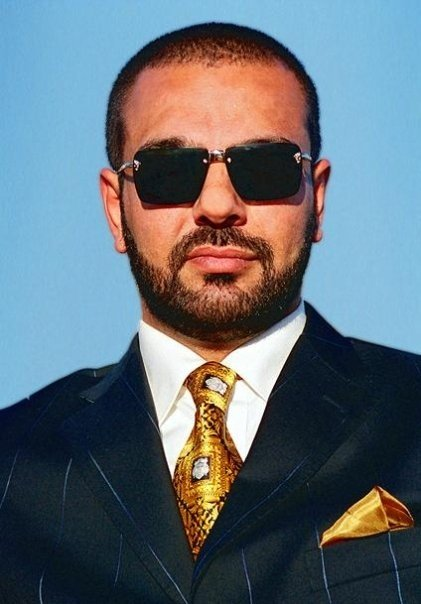
- Yahia in 2009
- Born: Latif Yahia; 14 June 1964 (age 62); Baghdad, Iraq
- Writing career
- Years active: 1992–present
- Military career
- Allegiance: Iraq
- Branch: Iraqi Ground Forces
- Service years: 1980–1987
- Rank: Captain
- Conflicts: Iran–Iraq War

Latif Yahia (Arabic: لطيف يحيى, romanized: Laṭīf Yaḥīa, Kurdish: لەتیف یەحیا; born 14 June 1964) is an Iraqi blogger, political writer, and former captain that served in the Iran–Iraq War. He is known for being the alleged former body double of Uday Hussein, infamous elder son of Saddam Hussein.

== Biography ==
Yahia was born to a poor merchant family of Iraqi–Kurdish origins who had long been settled in Baghdad. He alleges that he became Uday's double in September 1987 during the Iran–Iraq War, in which he was a lieutenant. He was born 4 days before Uday’s official birth date. At the age of 23, he was summoned from the frontlines to the presidential palace, where he discovered that Uday remembered that classmates had remarked on the resemblance between the two when they were in school together. Yahia was informed that he was to become Uday's fedai (body double) to make public appearances as Uday whenever a dangerous situation was expected. Yahia initially refused to take the job and was subsequently put in solitary confinement. After his imprisonment, Latif agreed to be Uday's double. He was trained for six months to imitate Uday's speech patterns and manner. He underwent surgery and dental work to make their appearances more similar. During the Iraqi invasion of Kuwait, Yahia was used as a morale booster for the Iraqi troops and sent to Basra posing as Uday to meet with troops.

His relationship later deteriorated. According to Yahia, the final straw came when a woman Uday was interested in paid more attention to Yahia. Uday shot at him, grazing him. When ordered to kill the father of a beauty pageant holder, a defiant Yahia slit his arms in front of Uday and the father. Yahia fled north in November 1991, where he was arrested by Kurdish Peshmerga, being mistaken for Uday. When they realized he was not Uday, he was released and granted asylum in Austria in 1992. After Yahia was attacked in Austria, he moved to London in 1995.

=== Challenges to Yahia's claims ===
Irish Times journalist Eoin Butler and Sunday Times journalist Ed Caesar have questioned Yahia's various claims, including that he was Uday Hussein's body double, and pointed out that many of Yahia's activities since leaving Iraq in 1992, including his education, have not been verified. In 2011, Caesar interviewed various people from the time of the Hussein regime who said they had never heard of Yahia, nor of Uday ever using doubles. Yahia disputes these claims, saying that his very existence was a state secret.

== Personal life ==
Yahia currently lives in Monaco. He is married and has 5 children. He also lived in Cyprus.

== Film ==
The movie The Devil's Double, directed by Lee Tamahori and starring Dominic Cooper as Yahia and Uday, premiered at the 2011 Sundance Film Festival on 22 January 2011.

Yahia was also the subject of an episode of National Geographic Channel's Locked Up Abroad in 2012.

== Books ==
- I was Saddam's Son released on 1 May 1994 by Arcade Publishing. Hardcover: 250 pages. Co-author: Karl Wendl.
- The Devil's Double released on 5 June 2003 by Arrow Books Ltd. Paperback: 334 pages.
- The Black Hole released on 20 November 2006 by Arcanum Publishing. Paperback: 224 pages
- The Hangman of Abu Ghraib released on 20 November 2015 by Arcanum Publishing. Paperback: 484 pages.
