= Dominic Cooper =

English actor (born 1978)

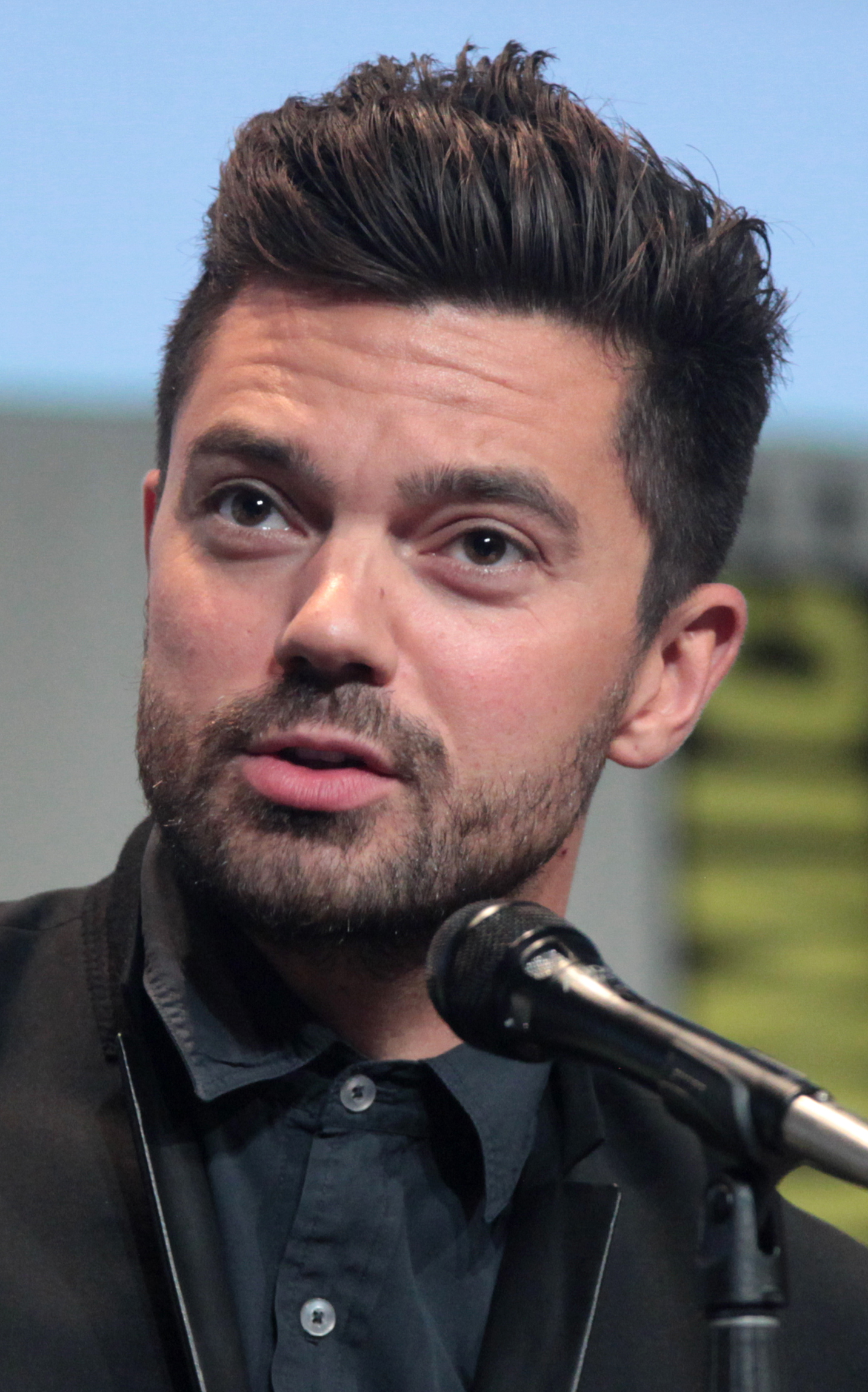
- Cooper in 2015
- Born: Dominic Edward Cooper; 2 June 1978 (age 48); London, England
- Education: London Academy of Music and Dramatic Art (BA)
- Occupation: Actor
- Years active: 2001–present
- Partners: Ruth Negga (2010–2016); Gemma Chan (2018–present)

Dominic Edward Cooper (born 2 June 1978) is an English actor known for his portrayal of comic book characters Jesse Custer on the AMC show Preacher (2016–2019) and young Howard Stark in the Marvel Cinematic Universe, with appearances in Captain America: The First Avenger (2011) and the ABC series Agent Carter (2015–2016), among other Marvel productions. Cooper played Sky in Mamma Mia! (2008) and its sequel, Mamma Mia! Here We Go Again (2018).

Early in his career, Cooper was cast in significant roles in productions by the Royal National Theatre and Royal Shakespeare Company; he received acclaim for originating the role of Dakin in the 2004 play The History Boys with which, in 2006, he returned to the West End, transferred to Broadway, and adapted to film. Since that time, he has acted in a series of British and American productions, including the acclaimed period pieces An Education (2009) and My Week with Marilyn (2011), as well as action films, such as Abraham Lincoln: Vampire Hunter (2012) and Need for Speed (2014), and the fantasy film Warcraft (2016).

== Early life and education ==
Dominic Edward Cooper was born on 2 June 1978 in Greenwich, London, where he was raised, the son of Julie (née Heron), a nursery school teacher, and Brian Cooper, an auctioneer. He has two brothers, Simon and Nathan, the latter a musician in the band The Modern, as well as a half-brother, James, and a half-sister, Emma.

Cooper attended John Ball Primary School in Blackheath, London, followed by Thomas Tallis School in nearby Kidbrooke. He later trained in professional acting at the London Academy of Music and Dramatic Art (LAMDA), graduating in 2000.

== Career ==
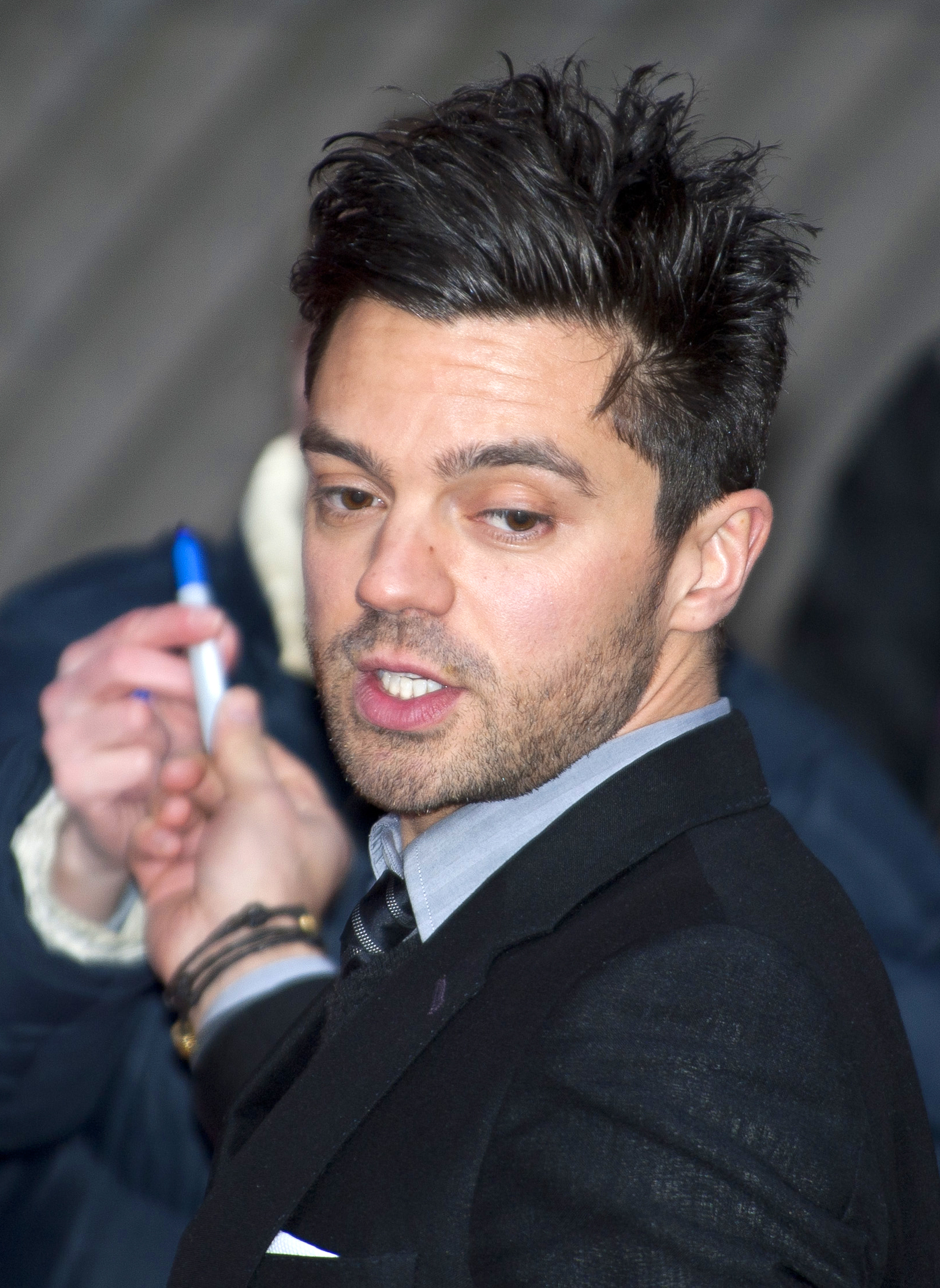
Cooper at the 2011 Berlin International Film Festival for The Devil's Double

Cooper first worked in television and film before making his stage debut in Mother Clap's Molly House at the National Theatre in 2001. Cooper was involved in Alan Bennett's play The History Boys, as the character Dakin, from its first reading. He also toured with the production to Broadway, Sydney, Wellington and Hong Kong as well as appearing in the radio and film adaptations of the play. He has had notable roles in the Royal National Theatre's adaptation of the His Dark Materials trilogy where he played the lead character Will Parry, the TV series Down To Earth and Sense & Sensibility.

In 2008, he appeared as Sky in Mamma Mia!, in which he sang several songs. The same year, he appeared opposite Keira Knightley in The Duchess as Charles Grey, 2nd Earl Grey. He starred in films An Education and Freefall in 2009 and also played Hippolytus in Phèdre at the National Theatre alongside Helen Mirren and Margaret Tyzack.

In 2010, he played rock drummer Ben in the film Tamara Drewe, and in 2011 played the leading roles of Latif Yahia and Uday Hussein, Iraqi dictator Saddam Hussein's son in the biographical film The Devil's Double, which was critically acclaimed but criticised for whitewashing, and portrayed Milton H. Greene in My Week with Marilyn. 2011 was also the year Cooper first appeared as Howard Stark in the Marvel Cinematic Universe. Initially appearing in the film Captain America: The First Avenger, he reprised his role in the Marvel One-Shot Agent Carter two years later, and in the television series of the same name in 2015 and 2016.

In 2012, he appeared as vampire Henry Sturges in Abraham Lincoln: Vampire Hunter. Around this time, he was cast in the lead role in the unproduced Albert Hughes project Motor City based on the Black Listed script of the same name. In February 2012, he signed on to replace Clive Owen the financial thriller Cities, ultimately leaving Motor City. Cities was cancelled after production delays.

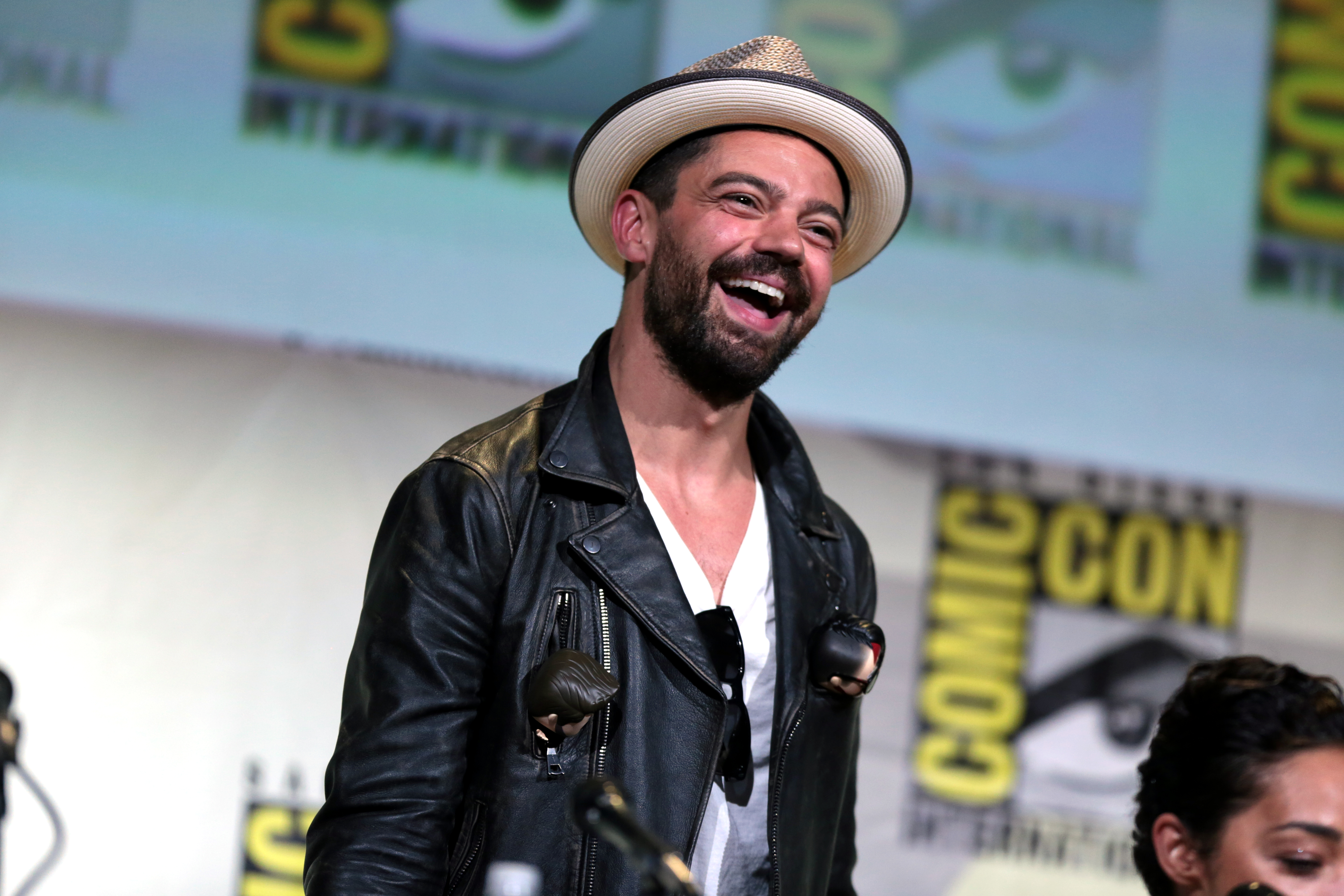
Cooper at the 2016 San Diego Comic Con to promote Preacher

In 2014, he portrayed the main antagonist in two films: Dino Brewster in Need for Speed and Mehmed in Dracula Untold. Cooper depicted James Bond author Ian Fleming in the television mini-series Fleming: The Man Who Would Be Bond in 2014. The next year, he appeared in two films, Miss You Already and The Lady in the Van, a film by Nicholas Hytner, who had previously directed him in the stage adaptation of His Dark Materials and both theatrical and film versions of The History Boys.

Cooper played Jesse Custer, the lead role in AMC's Preacher; the programme debuted in May 2016. He co-starred in the Warcraft film adaptation, which was released in June 2016. In late 2016, he starred in a well-received West End revival of Stephen Jeffreys' 1994 play, The Libertine at the Haymarket Theatre; he played John Wilmot, Earl of Rochester, the role originated on stage by John Malkovich and played by Johnny Depp in the 2004 film.

Cooper reprised his role of Sky in 2018's sequel film Mamma Mia! Here We Go Again.

== Personal life ==
Cooper shared a flat with James Corden, his co-star in The History Boys and Starter for 10, until Corden started a family with his wife, Julia Carey. Cooper introduced Corden to Carey, whom he had known for years and who was working at Save the Children when he and Corden called in one night. He is also the godfather of Corden's first child.

Cooper dated his Mamma Mia! co-star Amanda Seyfried on and off from 2008 to 2009. From 2010 to 2016, he was in a relationship with Irish actress Ruth Negga. They first met in 2009 on the set of the National Theatre's production of Phèdre, and later starred opposite each other in several projects, including the 2011 short film Hello Carter, the 2016 film Warcraft, and AMC's Preacher (2016–2019). They lived together in London's Primrose Hill. Although they separated in 2016, the split was not reported by the press until April 2018. Cooper has been in a relationship with actress Gemma Chan since 2018.

Cooper is a keen pickleball player. While filming Who the Hell is Hamish? in Melbourne in 2026, the production employed a pickleball coach to play with him throughout the three-month shoot.

== Politics ==
In August 2014, he was one of 200 public figures who were signatories to a letter to The Guardian expressing their hope that Scotland would vote to remain part of the United Kingdom in September's referendum on that issue. In 2023, he signed the Artists4Ceasefire's open letter to President Joe Biden calling for an immediate ceasefire during the Gaza war.

== Filmography ==
Key
†	Denotes projects that have not yet been released

=== Film ===
Year	Title	Role	Notes	Ref.
2001	From Hell	Constable		
2002	Anazapta	Clerk		
2002	The Final Curtain	Young Priest		
2003	I'll Be There	Boyfriend		
2005	Breakfast on Pluto	Disco Squaddie		
2006	Starter for 10	Spencer		
2006	The History Boys	Stuart Dakin		
2008	The Escapist	Lacey		
2008	Mamma Mia!	Sky Rymand		
2008	Official Selection	The Stranger	Short film	
2008	The Duchess	Charles Grey, 2nd Earl Grey		
2009	An Education	Danny		
2009	Brief Interviews with Hideous Men	Daniel / Subject No. 46		
2010	Tamara Drewe	Ben Sergeant		
2010	A Turtle's Tale: Sammy's Adventures	Sammy	Voice role; UK Version	
2011	The Devil's Double	Latif Yahia / Uday Hussein		
2011	Captain America: The First Avenger	Howard Stark		
2011	My Week with Marilyn	Milton H. Greene		
2011	Hello Carter	Carter	Short film	
2012	Abraham Lincoln: Vampire Hunter	Henry Sturges		
2013	Dead Man Down	Darcy		
2013	Summer in February	AJ Munnings		
2013	Agent Carter	Howard Stark	Short film	
2014	Reasonable Doubt	Mitch Brockden		
2014	Need for Speed	Dino Brewster		
2014	Dracula Untold	Sultan Mehmed II		
2015	The Lady in the Van	Theatre Actor		
2015	Miss You Already	Kit		
2016	Warcraft	King Llane Wrynn		
2017	Stratton	John Stratton		
2017	The Escape	Mark		
2018	Mamma Mia! Here We Go Again	Sky Rymand		
2022	The Princess	Julius		
2026	The Lightkeeper	Seamus		

=== Television ===
Year	Title	Role	Notes	Ref.
2001	Gentleman Thief	PC Merrifield	Television film	
2001	The Infinite Worlds of H. G. Wells	Sidney Davidson	Miniseries; 6 episodes	
2001	Band of Brothers	Allington	Episode: "Currahee"	
2003	Boudica	Foot Soldier	Television film	
2003	Sparkling Cyanide	Andy Hoffman	Television film	
2004	Down to Earth	Danny Wood	Series 4 regular;	
2005	Jericho	Marcus Hare	Episode: "The Hollow Men"	
2008	Sense and Sensibility	John Willoughby	Miniseries; 3 episodes	
2008	God on Trial	Moche	Television film	
2009	Horne & Corden	Various	Episode: "Episode 2"	
2009	Freefall	Dave Matthews	Television film	
2014	Fleming: The Man Who Would Be Bond	Ian Fleming	Miniseries; 4 episodes	
2014	On Angel Wings	Angel Gabriel	Television film	
2015–2016	Agent Carter	Howard Stark	Recurring role; 5 episodes	
2016–2019	Preacher	Jesse Custer	Series regular; 43 episodes	
2020	Spy City	Fielding Scott	Miniseries; 6 episodes	
2021, 2024	What If...?	Howard Stark	Recurring role; 2 episodes	
2022	That Dirty Black Bag	Arthur McCoy	Series regular; 8 episodes	
2023–2025	The Gold	Edwyn Cooper	Series regular; 7 episodes	
2024	My Lady Jane	Lord Seymour	Series regular; 8 episodes	
2024	Suspect	Jon Fallow	Series 2 regular; 8 episodes	
2025	The Last Frontier	Levi Taylor 'Havlock' Hartman	Series regular; 10 episodes	
2026	Adultery	Tom Kirkman	Main cast	
2026	Who the Hell Is Hamish?	Hamish McLaren	Series regular; 6 episodes	

=== Radio ===
Year	Title	Role	Notes
2005	The All-Colour Vegetarian Cookbook	Damien	
2006	The History Boys	Dakin	

== Theatre credits ==
Year	Title	Role	Venue	Run	Notes
1999	Charley's Aunt		Repertory Theatre	August 1999	
2001–2002	Mother Clap's Molly House	Thomas / Josh	National Theatre – Lyttelton	Sept – Nov 2001	Original production
2002	Caryl Churchill Events	Cliff / Young Man	Royal Court Theatre	October 2002	Off-West End readings
2002	A Midsummer Night's Dream	Puck	Royal Shakespeare Theatre	Feb – Mar 2002	
2002	A Midsummer Night's Dream	Puck	England, Spain, U.S.	Mar – June 2002	International tour
2002	A Midsummer Night's Dream	Puck	Barbican Theatre	Apr – May 2002	London residency during tour
2003	Call to Prayer		Operating Theatre Company	—N/a	RADA reading
2003–2004	His Dark Materials	Will	National Theatre – Olivier	Dec 2003 – Mar 2004	Original production
2004–2006	The History Boys	Dakin	National Theatre – Lyttelton	May – July 2004	Original production
2004–2006	The History Boys	Dakin	National Theatre – Lyttelton	Nov 2005 – Feb 2006	
2004–2006	The History Boys	Dakin	HKAPA	February 2006	International tour
2004–2006	The History Boys	Dakin	St. James Theatre	February 2006	International tour
2004–2006	The History Boys	Dakin	Sydney Theatre	March 2006	International tour
2004–2006	The History Boys	Dakin	Broadhurst Theatre	Apr – Oct 2006	Broadway transfer
2009	Phèdre	Hippolytus	Lyttelton Theatre	June 2009	
2009	Phèdre	Hippolytus	Shakespeare Theatre Company	September 2009	Washington, D.C. transfer
2016	The Libertine	John Wilmot, 2nd Earl of Rochester	Theatre Royal	Aug – Sep 2016	
2016	The Libertine	John Wilmot, 2nd Earl of Rochester	Theatre Royal Haymarket	Sep – Dec 2016	West End transfer

== Awards and recognition ==
Awards and nominations received by Dominic Cooper
Award	Year	Category	Nominated work	Result	Ref(s)
British Independent Film Awards	2006	Best Newcomer	The History Boys	Nominated	
Capri Hollywood International Film Festival	2011	Best Ensemble Cast	My Week with Marilyn	Nominated	
Dublin Film Critics' Circle	2007	Best Lead Actor	The Devil's Double	Nominated	
Drama Desk Award	2006	Best Actor	The History Boys	Nominated	
Empire Awards	2008	Best Male Newcomer	The History Boys and Starter for 10	Nominated	
London Film Critics' Circle Awards	2008	Best British Supporting Actor	The History Boys	Nominated	
Online Film & Television Association	2015	Best Guest Actor in a Drama	Agent Carter	Nominated	
Screen Actors Guild Awards	2010	Best Performance by an Ensemble	An Education	Nominated	
Satellite Awards	2015	Best Actor in a Limited Series or Movie made for Television	Fleming: The Man Who Would Be Bond	Nominated	
Saturn Awards	2011	Best Actor	Devil's Double	Nominated	
Saturn Awards	2015	Best Guest Actor	Agent Carter	Nominated	
