= Do Not Resuscitate (The Sopranos) =

- The Sopranos episode
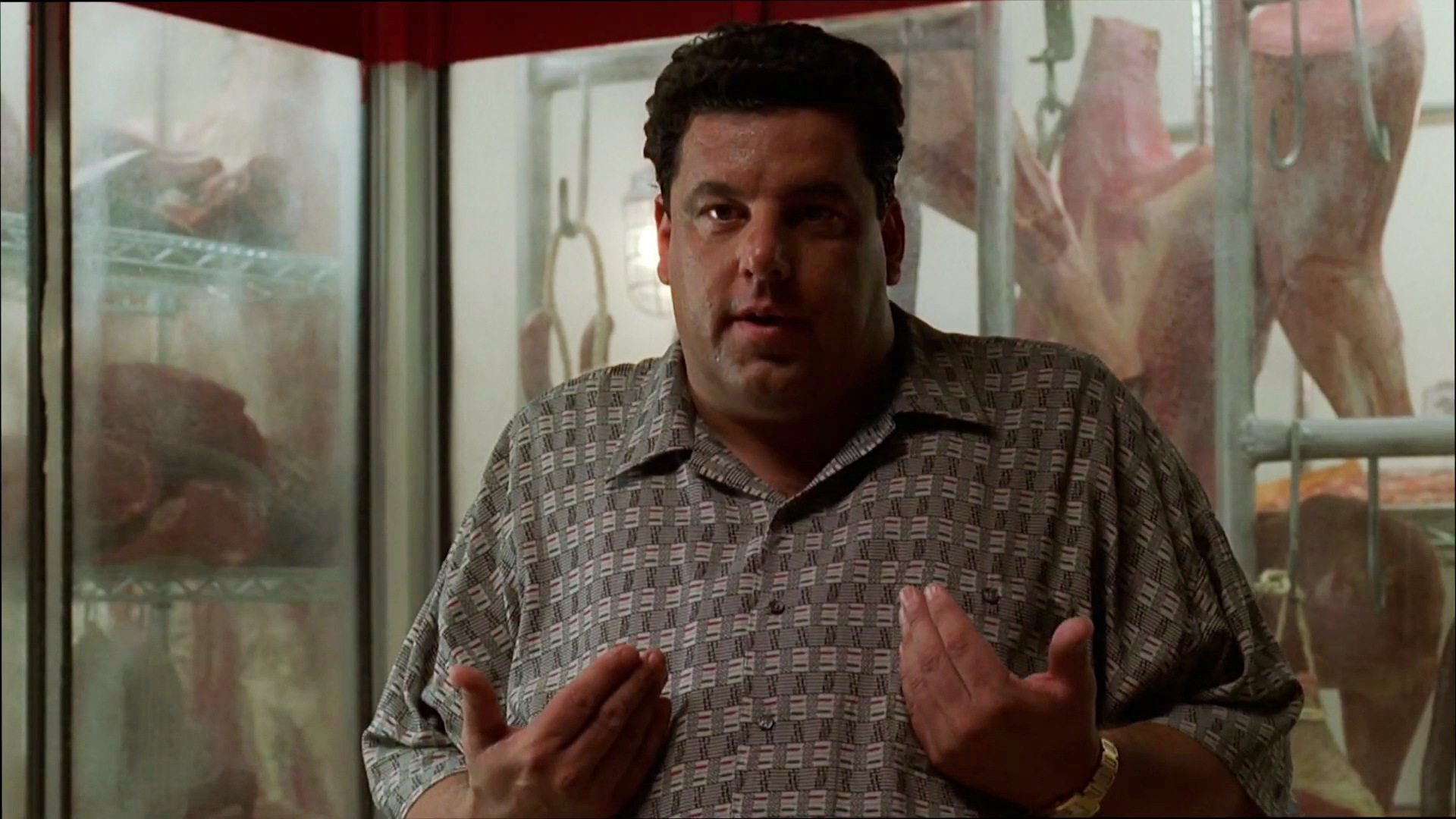
- Bobby Baccalieri meeting with Tony Soprano
- Episode no.: Season 2 Episode 2
- Directed by: Martin Bruestle
- Written by: Robin Green; Mitchell Burgess; Frank Renzulli
- Cinematography by: Phil Abraham
- Production code: 202
- Original air date: January 23, 2000
- Running time: 50 minutes

Episode chronology
← Previous "Guy Walks into a Psychiatrist's Office..."	Next → "Toodle-Fucking-Oo"
- The Sopranos season 2

"Do Not Resuscitate" is the 15th episode of the HBO original series The Sopranos and the second of the show's second season. Written by Robin Green, Mitchell Burgess, and Frank Renzulli, and directed by Martin Bruestle, it originally aired on January 23, 2000.

== Starring ==
- James Gandolfini as Tony Soprano
- Lorraine Bracco as Dr. Jennifer Melfi *
- Edie Falco as Carmela Soprano
- Michael Imperioli as Christopher Moltisanti
- Dominic Chianese as Corrado Soprano, Jr.
- Vincent Pastore as Pussy Bonpensiero
- Steven Van Zandt as Silvio Dante
- Tony Sirico as Paulie Gualtieri
- Robert Iler as Anthony Soprano, Jr.
- Jamie-Lynn Sigler as Meadow Soprano
- Drea de Matteo as Adriana La Cerva *
- Aida Turturro as Janice Soprano
- Nancy Marchand as Livia Soprano

* = credit only

=== Guest starring ===
- Bill Cobbs as Reverend James, Sr.
- Lillo Brancato Jr. as Matt Bevilaqua
- Louis Lombardi as Skip Lipari
- Gregalan Williams as Reverend James, Jr.
- Richard Portnow as Attorney Melvoin
- Steven R. Schirripa as "Bacala" Baccalieri
- Chris Tardio as Sean Gismonte
- Robert Desiderio as Jack Massarone
- Michael Broughton as Protester
- James Collins as Truck Driver
- Catherine Dent as Arlene Riley
- John Fiore as Gigi Cestone
- Elizabeth Flax as Therapist
- Sam Gray as Judge Greenspan
- Timothy Huang as Doctor
- Tertia Lynch as Duty Nurse
- John Mariano as Ralph Giorgio
- Tony Rigo as Old Guy
- Laurine Towler as Surgical Nurse
- Kellie Turner as Nurse's aide
- Beatrice Winde as Funeral Guest

== Synopsis ==
Jack Massarone's construction company, which provides no-show jobs to Tony, is being picketed by black protesters led by Reverend Herman James, Jr. In return for payment by Massarone, Tony sends some thugs who beat up the protesters. In reality, Tony and Reverend James are colluding, and they split the payment. Meanwhile, Pussy meets with his FBI handler, Agent Skip Lipari, and attempts to stall Lipari's demands for information.

Tony visits Uncle Junior in jail. Junior tries to convince Tony that Livia had nothing to do with the attempted hit and urges him to make peace with her. Tony mocks him for being manipulated by Livia. Tony tells Junior's aide, Bobby "Bacala" Baccalieri, that Junior will keep the title of boss and will be permitted to "earn" on a "subsistence level"; the rest will be Tony's.

Junior is released from prison on medical grounds, but he is placed under house arrest with an ankle monitor. He conducts business at his doctor's office, which cannot be bugged. At an ostensible appointment there, Junior tells Tony that the owner of Livia's former nursing home, Freddie Capuano, has been gossiping about him, Livia and Tony. Capuano disappears; a state trooper finds his abandoned Cadillac, with his toupée lying nearby.

Janice continues to visit Livia in the hospital. They antagonize each other, but when Janice plays old music that Livia loves, they bond for the first time in years. Livia speaks of the money she has hidden; she doesn't remember where. Tony contemptuously tells Janice they deserve each other; she can live with Livia in her house when she leaves the hospital. During a visit to his grandmother, A.J. innocently mentions DNR. Questioning him, Livia realizes that Janice and Tony are considering a DNR instruction for her.

One evening, Junior slips in the shower and is badly hurt. He speaks of his guilt to Tony and again urges him to make peace with Livia. He will not accept an ambulance but allows Tony to carry him to his car and drive him to the emergency room.

== First appearances ==
- "Black" Jack Massarone: owner of Massarone Brothers Construction, which was once run by Uncle Junior
- Bobby "Bacala" Baccalieri: a member of the Junior Soprano crew who becomes Junior's chief aide
- Agent Skip Lipari: FBI agent handling Big Pussy Bonpensiero
- Reverend James, Jr.: Christian minister, secret associate of Tony Soprano

== Deceased ==
- Frederick "Freddie" Capuano: Director of Green Grove Retirement Community, presumed murdered by the DiMeo crime family for talking about Mafia business and about Tony's attempt to kill his mother, though his body is never shown on screen
- Reverend Herman James, Sr.: dies of natural causes at the age of 83

== Title reference ==
- The episode's title is a common medical clause known as Do Not Resuscitate or DNR. Janice and Tony talk about signing a DNR for Livia.

== Cultural references ==
- Janice quotes (slightly misquotes) from The Mourning Bride by William Congreve: "Music hath charms..."
- Bobby quotes (slightly misquotes) the words of Senator William L. Marcy: "To the victor belong the spoils."

== Production ==
- Although this was the second episode of Season 2 to air, it was the third to be produced.

== References to other media ==
- After Livia finds out about Janice's plans regarding the DNR (and that Janice will be moving in with her), she confronts her daughter, saying: "I've seen that movie with Richard Widmark." This is most likely a reference to the film Kiss of Death (1947), in which Widmark's character (a gleefully psychotic killer) pushes a wheelchair-using elderly woman down a flight of stairs to her death. This is reinforced by the fact that during this scene, Janice briefly hallucinates an image of Livia falling down the stairs on an "In case of fire use stairs" sign on the hospital wall. It may alternatively be seen as a reference to the 1978 film Coma, also starring Widmark.
- When Tony finally gives his begrudging approval for Janice to live with Livia in the latter's home, he says "It'll be like 'Whatever Happened to Baby Janice?' over there," likely referring to the Bette Davis/Joan Crawford film What Ever Happened to Baby Jane?

== Music ==
- The song playing as Janice drives home from the hospital while smoking marijuana is "Mother and Child Reunion," by Paul Simon.
- The song playing when Janice reconciles with Livia in the hospital is "Non ti scordar di me," sung by tenor Luciano Pavarotti.
- The song played over the end credits is "Goodnight, My Love" by Ella Fitzgerald and Benny Goodman.

== Filming locations ==
Listed in order of first appearance:

- Jersey City, New Jersey
- North Caldwell, New Jersey
- Montclair, New Jersey
- Wayne Towne Center in Wayne, New Jersey
- Satriale's Pork Store in Kearney, New Jersey
- Newark, New Jersey
- West Orange, New Jersey
- Beneath the New Jersey Turnpike along the Passaic River in the Meadowlands
