= Uday Hussein =

Iraqi politician and son of Saddam Hussein (1964–2003)

Uday Saddam Hussein
- عدي صدام حسين
- Undated photo of Uday

Member of the National Assembly
- In office 27 March 2000 – 9 April 2003
- Constituency: Baghdad

Commander of the Fedayeen Saddam
- In office 1995 – 12 December 1996
- President: Saddam Hussein
- Preceded by: Position established
- Succeeded by: Qusay Hussein

President of the Iraqi Olympic Committee
- In office May 1990 – 9 April 2003
- Preceded by: Karim Mahmoud Al-Mulla
- Succeeded by: Ahmed Abdul-Ghafur Al-Samarrai (acting)
- In office 27 February 1986 – 6 November 1988
- Preceded by: Nouri Faisal Al-Shaher
- Succeeded by: Karim Mahmoud Al-Mulla

Personal details
- Born: Uday Saddam Hussein al-Nasiri al-Tikriti; 18 June 1964 Baghdad, Iraq
- Died: 22 July 2003 (aged 39) Mosul, Iraq
- Cause of death: Gunshot wounds
- Resting place: Tikrit, Iraq
- Party: Arab Socialist Ba'ath Party
- Parent(s): Saddam Hussein (father); Sajida Talfah (mother)
- Relatives: Qusay (brother); Raghad (sister); Rana (sister); Hala (sister); Adnan Khairallah (maternal uncle)
- Education: University of Baghdad (BE, MA, PhD)
- Occupation: Politician, businessman, military commander
- Nickname: Abu Sarhan

Military service
- Allegiance: Ba'athist Iraq
- Branch/service: Iraqi Air Force (1988); Fedayeen Saddam (1995–1996)
- Years of service: 1988–2003
- Rank: Commander
- Battles/wars: Iran–Iraq War; Gulf War; Iraq War †

Uday Saddam Hussein (Arabic: عدي صدام حسين; 18 June 1964 – 22 July 2003) was an Iraqi politician, military leader, and businessman. He was the eldest son of Iraqi president Saddam Hussein and his first wife Sajida Talfah. He was known for his extreme excessive cruelty, abuse of women, erratic behavior, and human rights abuses, which included torture, rape, and murder.

Born in Baghdad, Uday was seen for several years as the likely successor to his father; however, he lost the place as heir apparent to his younger brother, Qusay, owing to injuries in an assassination attempt. Because of his family connections, Uday held multiple roles in the Iraqi political and military circles, as well as in business.

He held positions as a sports chairman, heading the Iraqi Olympic Committee, Iraq Football Association, and the Saddam loyalist militia Fedayeen Saddam. He was notorious for using his positions and father's influence to inflict torture and abuse. According to Iraqi athletes Issam Thamer al-Diwan and Habib Jaafer, athletes who lost matches were often imprisoned, beaten, and tortured in a private prison in the basement of the Olympic Committee building, beaten with iron bars, dragged along pavements, or by being dropped into sewage (so that the wounds from beatings got infected).

Uday was accused of serial rape and murder of young women and underage girls, whom his guards would often snatch from the streets and force to come to his parties. In one infamous incident, he bludgeoned his father's favorite bodyguard to death at a party in 1988, an act for which he was briefly imprisoned by his father and tried. He made unsuccessful attempts to kill himself in prison.

Owing to Uday's violent and unstable nature, Saddam eventually favored his younger, more discreet son Qusay as his successor. In 1996, Uday was severely injured in an assassination attempt by gunmen, which left him partially paralyzed and able to walk only with great difficulty. Following the US-led invasion of Iraq in 2003, he was killed alongside Qusay and his nephew Mustafa by an American task force after a prolonged gunfight in Mosul.

== Early life and education ==
Uday Saddam Hussein Al-Nasiri Al Tikriti was born in Karkh, Baghdad, to Saddam Hussein and Sajida Talfah while his father was in prison. Multiple sources give different birth dates; although official sources give a birth date of 18 June 1964, The Independent gave a birth date of 9 March 1964, while others give a 1965 birth. One source gave it as early as 1963. He was rumored to have played with disarmed grenades as an infant. As a child, he and his younger brother Qusay would witness executions with their father.

Uday attended al-Mansour school in Baghdad in the 1970s. One of his teachers was Dinah Bentley, an English teacher from Yorkshire who married an Iraqi and briefly taught at the school. Uday was reportedly driven to school by a chauffeur in a Mercedes-Benz and surrounded by servants. He picked up his English teacher's Yorkshire accent and was described as a cheerful, bright child who was responsive to discipline, but an average student who struggled to concentrate.

During the Iran–Iraq War, both Uday and Qusay, along with the son of Tariq Aziz, were sent to serve as officers in the battalion of Ra'ad al-Hamdani. However, it was reportedly a political stunt so that Saddam and Tariq Aziz could claim their sons were fighting in the war, and Hamdani was told not to let any of them die. Uday also studied at Baghdad Medical College, but only stayed for three days. Then he moved to the College of Engineering, and obtained a Bachelor of Engineering from the University of Baghdad. He wrote his master's thesis on "Iraqi military strategy during the eight-year Iran-Iraq war". He obtained a doctorate in political science from the University of Baghdad in 1998 and the title of his dissertation was "The world after the Cold War", in which he predicted the United States would no longer be a world power in 2015. Some have argued that Uday did not have academic prowess and his theses were written by others in exchange for money and gifts, with no one able to give Uday a low score out of fear. "He was really smart, probably smarter than his father—but he was crazy," said one of his classmates about Uday.

== Torture of Iraqi athletes ==
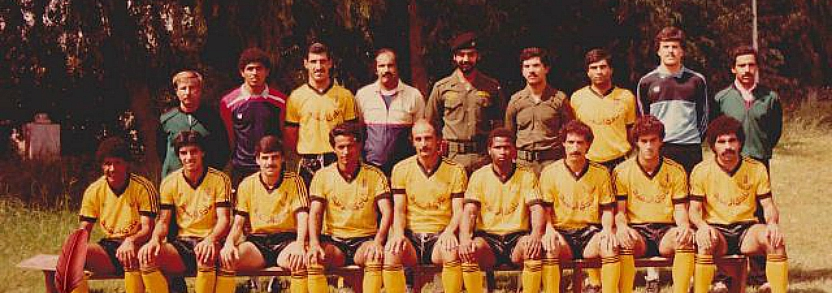
Squad of Al-Rasheed in the 1984–85 season. Uday Hussein and Qusay Hussein are in the top row, middle.

In 1984, after Uday graduated from university, Saddam appointed him chairman of the Iraqi Olympic Committee and the Iraq Football Association. In the former role, he tortured athletes who failed to win. According to Latif Yahia, Uday's alleged body double, "The word that defines him is sadistic. I think Saddam Hussein was more human than Uday. The Olympic Committee was not a sports center, it was Uday's world".

Raed Ahmed, an Iraqi athlete who defected to the United States, said: "During training, he would watch all the athletes closely, and put pressure on the coaches to push the athletes even more. If he was not happy with the results, he would have coaches and athletes put in his private prison in the Olympic Committee building. The punishment was Uday's private prison where they tortured people. Torture methods included soccer matches where the players were forced to kick concrete balls in extreme heat up and excessive fitness drilling up to twelve hours. Some athletes, including the best ones, started quitting the sport once Uday took over the Committee ... I always managed not to be punished. I made sure not to promise anything. There is a strong possibility of always being beaten. But when I won, Uday would be very happy." In 2005, a video of Uday questioning Raed's family was released. They were then reportedly transported by car to a prison, where they remained for 16 days in poor conditions.

Ammo Baba, whose football teams won 18 tournaments and participated in three Olympics, said that Uday's punishment destroyed players' athletic abilities. Baba said that half of the Iraqi athletes had left the country, and many had feigned illness before playing against strong competitors; he reportedly told his friends that if he died suddenly, they would know the reason. Maad Ibrahim Hamid, assistant coach of the national football team, said that Uday rewarded players financially for winning and threatened them with imprisonment if they lost. According to Hamid, athletes were not tortured; they were arrested for immoral behaviour (including adultery and addiction to alcohol) and for playing poorly. Ahmed Radhi said that after he was unwilling to join the new Al-Rasheed club, he was kidnapped at midnight by Uday's men, beaten and accused of harassment; he accepted Uday's offer when he was threatened with death. International footballer Saad Qais said that Uday was angry with him because he was sent off during a mid 1990's match against Turkmenistan. His "discipline" was administered by jailers (known as "teachers") in a closed section of a detention facility for athletes and journalists in Radwaniyah Palace. According to Qais, "Uday established the Rashid team and forced the best Iraqi players to play in it, and forced me to leave my beloved team, and he honored us with gifts after every win, but he also punished us after every loss."

== Murder of Kamel Hana Gegeo ==
Although his status as Saddam's elder son made him Saddam's prospective successor, Uday fell out of favour with his father owing to his public erraticness. In October 1988, at a party in honour of Suzanne Mubarak, wife of Egyptian president Hosni Mubarak, Uday murdered his father's personal valet and food taster, Kamel Hana Gegeo. Before an assemblage of horrified guests, an intoxicated Uday bludgeoned Gegeo who died of internal bleeding hours later. Gegeo had recently introduced Saddam to a younger woman, Samira Shahbandar, who had become Saddam's second wife in 1986. Uday considered his father's relationship with Shahbandar an insult to his mother. Shahbandar's oldest son fled to Jordan because of the harassment by Uday after the marriage. Uday also may have feared losing succession to Gegeo, whose loyalty to Saddam Hussein was unquestioned.

As punishment for the murder, Saddam briefly imprisoned Uday. Once released, Uday was sent to Switzerland to act as the assistant to the Iraqi ambassador there. He was expelled by the Swiss government in 1990, after he was repeatedly arrested for fighting. According to Jalopnik, Uday's vast car collection was burned by his father after the Gegeo incident.

Others describe the murder as follows: Next to the palace where Suzanne Mubarak and Uday's mother were staying, Gegeo was celebrating the wedding of a relative and firing in the air. Uday sent his men and asked them not to bother the two women. During the discussion, Uday hit Gegeo's head with his walking stick, causing Gegeo's death. Uday, afraid of his father's reaction, tried to commit suicide and was taken to the hospital. He escaped from the hospital, set up a barricade around his home, and fired at anyone trying to enter his home. He surrendered with the persuasion of his brother Qusay.

According to the memory of Uday's half-uncle Barzan Ibrahim al-Tikriti, after escaping from the hospital he went to his father's palace and told him to "stay with your real wife." Saddam then said to Barzan, "He was lucky because I had no weapon with me." However, Uday later came to the door of the palace again and told Barzan that he intended to shoot his father. He fired at Qusay and at step-uncles who were trying to prevent him from doing so. Later, under the guidance of Barzan, Uday apologized to his father. His father ordered him to surrender. When his brothers-in-law Hussein and Saddam Kamel learned that he was trying to escape to the United States, he was arrested on his father's orders, but released three weeks later. After the incident, Uday attacked two people whom he thought were informers. At the request of Saddam, Uday was sent out of Iraq under the control of Barzan to Switzerland in order to get rid of the disgrace caused by Uday.

Muhammad Asim Shanshal, head of the private office of Uday, said:

After a call from his mother, Sajida, told him that Kamel Hanna holds a joyful party for Saddam's second wife, Samira Shahbandar. There was shooting, rejoicing, and Uday shouting in the face of 'Kamel Hanna', denounced: "What is the mess?!" And he said: We celebrate on the occasion of lady and the President. Uday threatened him and warned him not to shoot bullets in the air, so it was 'Kamel Hanna' except that he raised his weapon in the air and fired bullets, so Uday's response was a fatal blow to his head with a heavy club that was with him, and he was killed. Saddam imprisoned all his guards and those who were with him, who were 15 individuals, and I was supposed to be with them had it not been for the delay that saved me from prison. They were sentenced to imprisonment, and Uday was exiled from Iraq to Switzerland for a period of six months.

President Hosni Mubarak of Egypt called Uday a "psychopath".

== Shooting of Watban Ibrahim ==
In 1995, during a fight between his maternal uncle Louay and paternal half uncle Watban Ibrahim, Uday shot Watban as well as the other guests at the party. The shooting left six bodyguards dead and Watban seriously injured. Uday then took Watban to the hospital and disappeared. Because his brothers-in-law, Hussein and Saddam Kamel, escaped to Jordan the next day, Uday's attack on his uncle remained in the background. Saddam ordered Uday to ask his uncle to shoot him in the same way as Uday had shot him, but Watban refused to do so. One of the injured at the party said that the reason for the attack was that Uday's half-uncle had mocked Uday's speech disorder, and his maternal uncle had told Uday about it. Since birth, Uday's upper jaw extended forward an abnormally large amount, making it difficult for him to speak clearly. At the ceremony, his uncle had imitated him mockingly. Shortly after the shooting incident, seeing his half-brother in the hospital having difficulty walking angered Saddam, who ordered the garage for Uday's luxury cars to be burned down. Saddam said at the time, "While Iraqis are suffering from the embargo, this situation may send a false message."

Uday was angry with his brother Qusay for not preventing Saddam and had a nervous breakdown. Qusay said he prevented him from burning another garage. Uday set up a barricade in front of his luxury cars in another nearby garage, armed himself with weapons, and waited for his father or his men to come. According to his close friend Jaber, Uday would have killed him if his father had come to the second garage.

According to Abbas Al Janabi:

The reason why Uday shot Watban was a result of a business conflict between Lu'ayy Khayrallah Tulfa [Sajida's brother; Uday's maternal uncle and his childhood friend] and one of Saddam's other half-brothers, with Watban becoming the victim. Following Uday's shooting of [his uncle] Watban, Saddam tried to confiscate and blow up Uday's cars in one garage. But that garage contained only thirteen cars. Saddam did not know that Uday has several other garages; I know of at least six more.

== Murder of Hussein Kamel and Saddam Kamel ==
In 1996, Uday along with Qusay, were said to be involved in the killings of their brothers-in-law, Hussein Kamel al-Majid and Saddam Kamel, who themselves were powerful members of the regime elite. The two men, who had defected to Jordan along with their wives and children, were murdered after their return to Iraq.

According to the book The Interrogation of Saddam Hussein by John Nixon, Uday provoked the escape of Hussein and Saddam Kamel in 1995. A drunk Uday went to Kamel's house where a party was being held, and punched Saddam Kamel. When he was defeated by Kamel, Uday took out his gun and fired, but accidentally wounded Watban, who got in the way. Shortly after the grooms escaped to Jordan, Saddam burned the garage for Uday's luxury cars, saying, "While Iraqis are suffering from the embargo, this situation may send a false message." Uday took over Iraq's oil sales, previously largely pocketed by the entourage of Hussein Kamel when he oversaw the oil business along with his responsibilities in defense and industry, Uday also zeroed in on other areas that had been the province of Kamel, including army equipment supplies, reconstruction and food imports. An Iraqi official said, "Kamel decided to defect because he became frightened that Uday was now getting strong enough to really take care of him."

About the murder, Abbas Al Janabi, said:

The decision to eliminate Husayn Kamil was not decided ahead of time but only after his return to Baghdad. On his return, Husayn Kamil was asked to go to the presidential palace. Saddam asked that both he and his brother divorce their wives (Saddam's daughters), but they both refused. In addition to Uday, Saddam had asked a prominent judge to attend the meeting with Husayn Kamil to prepare the divorce papers. I was at the palace at the time but I stayed outside the meeting room. I waited for 'Uday to leave the room, and he told me the details. After his refusal, Husayn Kamil went to his palace in the Ad-Dura area. The decision to eliminate them took place after their refusal to divorce. The decision to execute Husayn Kamil came from Saddam personally. Saddam had also decided that the execution should be carried out by Husayn Kamil's cousins in the al-Majid clan. It was the duty of Uday, Qusay, and Ali Hasan al-Majid to oversee the executions. Uday was not an initial proponent of his execution. However, after Husayn Kamil refused to divorce Uday's sister, Uday became a supporter of the decision to execute Husayn Kamil and his brother."

On that day, Janabi said, "With a loudspeaker, Uday said to him 'You and your brother have to divorce the girls, this is your last chance.' Instead of answering them, Kamel shoot them." The shoot-out lasted 13 hours. Then brothers and their father came out to surrender and they were dumped out. "After they kill him, from a very near distance they shoot him, many bullets in his body. He was just swimming with a lake of blood."

== Assassination attempt ==
Uday sustained permanent injuries during an assassination attempt while in his Porsche on the evening of 12 December 1996. Struck by between 7 and 17 bullets while driving in al-Mansour, Baghdad, Uday was initially believed to be paralyzed. Evacuated to Ibn Sina Hospital, he eventually recovered but with a noticeable limp. Despite repeated operations, two bullets remained lodged in his spine and could not be removed owing to their location. In the wake of Uday's subsequent disabilities, Saddam gave Qusay increasing responsibility and authority, designating him as his heir apparent in 2000. However, Abbas al-Janabi claimed that Uday's exclusion in the family ended after shooting his step-uncle Watban after this assassination attempt. An American hypnotist from Chicago, Larry Garrett, travelled to Baghdad twice, in April and September 2001, where he used hypnotism to treat Uday's inability to walk with his left leg and spent more than 60 hours of personal time with Uday. Garrett said of Uday, "He was an educated man, with a background in engineering. He was versed in the Koran. He had visited the U.S. with his cousin when he was 17. He expressed some political views, but he didn't involve me in them. I must say I was developing a fondness for him. He never spoke to me as a leader or the son of a leader. He never condescended. It was just two men sitting around at night." He published a book of his experiences with Uday in Iraq, initially titled Healing the enemy: Hypnotic Nights in Baghdad, but later changed to Hypnotizing the Devil: The True Story of a Hypnotist Who Treated the Psychotic Son of Saddam Hussein. He met with Uday on the day of the September 11 attacks, where Uday had great concern for Garrett's safety and told him Iraq would likely be blamed for the attack.

The Shia Shaaban movement assumed responsibility for the assassination attempt. Salman Sharif, one of the four would-be assassins who attacked Uday, learned that he regularly visited one of the luxurious streets of al-Mansour every Thursday at around 7 in the evening to pick up a girl. They watched the street for three months and made preparations. They realized that Uday was sometimes unprotected and tried to find out which shop owners and workers on the street were part of the secret police, and who were real shopkeepers. On the day of the assassination attempt, they saw a luxury car that could only belong to Uday without bodyguards. They shot at Uday exactly 50 times, with 17 hits. Some Shaaban members who knew about this assassination attempt were arrested for another incident in Jordan and handed over to the Iraqi police. In August 1998, Saddam's men arrested Abu Sajad and learned the details of other members of the team. Sharif's seven brothers and father were imprisoned, and his mother was then told to collect their bodies from the Baghdad morgue. The father and three brothers of would-be assassin Abu Sadeq were executed. Abu Sajad and his father shared the same fate. Security guards destroyed the homes of all families with bulldozers and confiscated all their property. Iraqi intelligence eventually traced Abu Sadeq to a location in Iran where he was assassinated on the elder Hussein's orders in December 2002.

Uday never fully recovered from the injuries he sustained during the attack; purportedly walking with a limp for the rest of his life and—according to popular belief—becoming impotent. Sharif interpreted this as "divine justice", referring to Uday's brutal reputation with women.

According to Alaa Bashir, the surgeon who operated on Uday, "He was not impotent because the injury was far from the reproductive system." He said that Uday saw the assassination attempt as God's revenge for having shot his uncle in the same leg. He said, "Saddam entered the operating room. He looked at his son with calmness, and if any other person, whatever his strength, saw his son in such a scene, he would've lost his temper, but Saddam did not shook his time, but turned around his son and said to him despite his knowledge Uday was unconscious, 'My son, such things are possible and can be expected for men, but we are right and they are false.' Then he kissed him on his forehead and left. Then he met his son Qusay and said to him, 'My son. These things happen to the men, except for a bullet or a wound with a knife. These are normal matters, but you must prepare yourself for the worst day.' Then he went out." About Uday's personality, Alaa Bashir said, "Uday was scary because he was unbalanced and did not care about anyone. He often attacked the leadership, and no one stood up to him, so I avoided him and did not come close to him. Uday used to hate me a lot and tried to offend me and caused me a lot of problems, but his father's interest in me was a deterrent in front of him."

Abbas al-Janabi, who had worked with Uday as his secretary for 15 years, claimed that every Iraqi knew that Uday had come to that street on Thursdays and claimed that Uday had become much more brutal after the assassination attempt. He also claimed that Uday was outraged by the rumors that he was impotent after the assassination attempt and ordered the secret police to make up stories about his virility. Janabi said, "Uday is a sadist, a monster. I saw how he laughed when someone was whipped." He also claimed that he witnessed dozens of rapes. He said that what makes Uday sexually excited was violence: "This is his nature, rape is like a hobby for him, and believe me, I know what I am talking about and I am not exaggerating." Janabi said, "I saw how he tortured people, how he laughed, how he enjoyed it, you can't control him, he is a kind of maniac, he is a psychologically imbalanced person." He said that Uday never kept friends around for long because he enjoyed scaring them. Uday didn't think that it was clean for his dogs to retrieve the birds he shot, so he would force his friends to act as retrievers when he went hunting. He said that Uday neutralized women who refused him with alcohol and drugs, raped them, recorded it, and if the victim's family was important, he terrorized the family by blackmail. He said that Uday even started to look at 12-year-old girls after he was 30 years old. Unlike their father, he said that Uday and Qusay are not the type of people to surrender.

Alaa Bashir claimed that Uday had sustained brain damage owing to low blood pressure after the assassination attempt, but doctors could not report this damage to Saddam. Again, according to Bashir, on the day of the incident, Ali Al Sahar, the brother of singer Kadim El Sahar, was with Uday, and the attempt was made on Uday's life when Ali got out of the car to give Uday's phone number to some girls that Uday liked. Ali immediately took Uday to the hospital. Qusay told his father that the incident happened when Uday went to buy food to break his fasting, but Saddam said to Ali, "I know you were going to pick up girls there." Earlier it was claimed that Uday was jealous of singer Kadim Al Sahar because of his fame in Iraq and Kadim had to leave Iraq because of his threats. Abbas Al Janabi said: "The interesting point here is that the person who saved Uday's life by driving him to the hospital, the singer Ali as-Sahir, received a death threat from Saddam personally in front of others. I was waiting outside the hospital with Qusay when Saddam arrived in a helicopter. He asked for Ali as-Sahir, who was brought to him. In front of us, Saddam told him: 'If anything happens to Uday, I will cut you in pieces.' Saddam thought that Sahir was behind the attempt."

After the assassination attempt, Uday said to the press: "I feel fine. I'm recovering. I feel like any leader of a team would feel if he had been betrayed. I feel that what has happened is not man's work (meaning this was a cowardly act). God bless the Iraqi people. God save Iraq. God save Saddam." To commemorate the first anniversary of his assassination attempt, 33 sheep were slaughtered in public in Southern Iraq in December 1997.

Later, Uday told CNN his wounds are a source of pride and honor. He cited a family history of wounds acquired in battle, ending with his father, wounded in an operation "for the party" in 1959. "And now this has happened to me," he said. "The attack was nothing unusual. It could happen any time, because we are surrounded by countries, some of whom are hostile," none more so than Iran, he said. "Time has proved that Iran is involved in such incidents. Incidents such as this have occurred throughout the region, not just in Iraq." He warned that Iran is growing in power, saying it is "not in the interests of the United States to increase hostility and hatred in the region."

== Partying ==
Uday was known for forcing guests to drink large quantities of alcohol at his parties. According to a friend, whoever earned Uday's friendship had to drink a cocktail named the "Uday Saddam Hussein", a mixture of whiskey, brandy, vodka, cognac, and beer. The cocktail was served in a large "cup of friendship", and the new friend had to drink it all. Uday had employees whose job was to make people and especially singers drink cocktails containing 90% alcohol, sometimes including drugs. The guard would line up all the entertainers against the wall and give them 10 minutes to drink. Those who did not drink despite the threats were punished in three ways: having their hair and eyebrows shaven off, being beaten until they could barely stand but leaving their face untouched, and being subjected to a foot whipping before being forced to walk. Often, the tortures were done in front of Uday in person. If the bodyguards did not do this, or when asked to answer correctly who was drinking and who did not, they would receive the same punishment. The bodyguards alleged that they tortured people in this way twice a week and at least 100 people a year. "When Uday wanted for a car, no one could stop him," one of his employees said. His employees claimed that they were also tortured by Uday or on Uday's orders. A source claimed that he had killed a friend after forcing him to drink large quantities of alcohol, and that it was not the first time that Uday had killed those close to him in this way.

Ismail Hussain, who worked as a singer at Uday's parties in the early 1990s, said "Uday did not need a reason to party. He would have food and drink tables while many people in Iraq were starving. He'd get drunk and dance—he was a good dancer too. Later, he'd bring out the machine guns and start shooting them off. He'd point the guns right over my head, and the bullets would spray all over the place. I would sing right through the flying bullets. I couldn't hear the music anymore. I'd just keep going, because I couldn't stop. It ended when Uday was ready for it to end. At the parties, there would be about five or six men and 40 or 50 women. He was moody. People were expendable." He said, "I would be performing, and Uday would climb up on the stage with a machine gun and start shooting it at the ceiling. Uday would insist that everyone get drunk with him. He would interrupt my performance, get up on stage with a big glass of cognac for himself and one for me. He would insist that I drink all of it with him. When he gets really drunk, out come the guns. His friends are all terrified of him, because he can have them imprisoned or killed. I saw him once get angry with one of his friends. He kicked the man in the ass so hard that his boot flew off. The man ran over and retrieved the boot and then tried to put it back on Uday's foot, with Uday cursing him all the while."

Singer Qasim Sultan was called to the Hunting Club after singing at private parties in the United States and returning to Baghdad. Uday ordered him to sing until the sun rose. At 8:00 a.m., Uday began shouting at Sultan, scolded him for returning to Baghdad without telling him and told his guards to beat him. When Sultan went to another midnight concert by Uday, Uday's bodyguards beat him for not arriving earlier. Before Sultan came on the stage, he was called by Uday to drink his "mysterious cocktail", a mixture of beer, gin and other hard liquors. Sultan was hospitalized twice because of the amount of alcohol he was forced to drink at these parties. He also claimed that in 1997, after the assassination attempt, in the garden of Uday's palace, he was forced to sing among the lions. He described the parties as "a place where armed cowboys can kill you at any time." After Al-Shabab was founded in 1993, Iraqi singers of the 70s and 80s, such as Fadel Awad, Saadoun Jaber and Riyadh Ahmed were banned by Uday, on the grounds that they were the singers of the previous generation. Uday said to them, "You are forbidden from singing and I do not want to hear that any of you sings at a party." The ban was issued, their songs were not shown on TV, they did not perform any concert, and did not record a song for TV. However, Singer Ali Al-Issawi said, "Uday was a fan of singing and a connoisseur and he listened to all the singers and enjoyed our songs. Uday did not punish anyone at that time, but he only held accountable the abusive artists. He used to meet with me two to three times during the same day and did not harm me or my group at all."

Uday often had Iraqi belly dancers at his parties, sometimes up to 50, but he refused to touch any of them, out of fear of catching diseases. Following his death and the regime's collapse, it was reported that Iraqi belly dancers struggled to find work in the field. Since Islam forbids such erotic dancing, one of Uday's former belly dancers later said she feared punishment from God, but noted that she had no choice since she needed the money to support her family.

== Other ventures ==
Uday founded his own sports club called Al-Rasheed and signed all the best players from the country to play for the club. They went on to dominate Iraqi football until the team was dissolved in 1990. He also became the editor of the Babel newspaper, the general secretary of the Iraqi Union of Students and the head of the Fedayeen Saddam, as well as the head of the Iraq Journalists Union. His newspaper, Babel, was known for carrying Western reports on Iraq's conflict with the United States and was said to be the most influential newspaper in the country. Uday also had a television channel, Youth TV (Al-Shabab), which aired reports by other Arab channels not usually heard on Iraq's state-run media. Uday used his media empire to discredit people who got in his way. Iraq's most popular radio station was Voice of Youth, owned by Uday, the only radio station that played Western music. Uday seemed proud of his reputation and called himself Abu Sarhan, an Arabic term for "wolf".

Uday also ran a food processing business called Super Chicken, which reportedly earned him millions of dollars, and an ice cream company called the Wave.

Uday was responsible for nearly 20 American prisoners of war captured during the Gulf War, including ex-Navy Commander Jeff Zaun, forced to appear on Iraqi state television and forced to condemn their country after being tortured.

Saad al-Bazzaz, who was the editor-in-chief of Uday's newspapers and state television, said, "In an editorial meeting, Uday got angry at an article in my newspaper and took out his gun. You could imagine our reaction when he started playing with the gold-plated Kalashnikov while yelling at us. After that, any kind of dialogue with him was impossible. When Uday took over most of the media, the situation in Iraq got worse. This man had nothing to do with journalism, but he saw that media is a powerful way to try to control the minds of the Iraqi people. He knew very well that many journalists did not support his father. Many people worked against the regime at night. Some were beaten and executed. Others were killed or fled the country, leaving their families vulnerable to Uday's bloody revenge retaliation."

Dhafer Muhammad Jaber Siddiq, one of Uday's closest aides, said about Uday: "He used to criticize his father's policies on many occasions, directly or indirectly, especially when discussing with Hussein Kamel... Uday was a young man like many young men trying to get close to beautiful women. He would send his phone number to every young woman he liked. There were a lot of women who were trying to get to know Uday, some of them changed their minds, and some of them strengthened their relationship with him...He was a person with many contradictions. For example, after the killing of his uncle, Minister of Defense Adnan Khairallah in 1989, he started to pray regularly and never cut it, and he fasted every Monday and Thursday, but he used to drink alcohol continuously. He was generous at times to the extreme, but at other times, he became unimaginably stingy. He had his independent empire. He used to say it himself, he used to say that he possessed the foundations of a state. He had press, television, sports, military and trade." Uday got a lawyer shot after he raised the case of a 17-year-old girl who was kidnapped and was rumored to be at Uday's Iraqi Olympic Committee compound. According to the lawyer's testimony, "Uday was looking at the papers I carried for him and then said: I will break both of your legs so that you cannot come back again, but I see your left leg was injured during the war with Iran, so I will break your right leg." One of Uday's men then shot the right leg of the lawyer, and had him thrown off near a hospital. As for the girl, she was finally sent to her home after being raped repeatedly and asked her family not to travel. However, she managed to escape to Poland, where some of her relatives lived. But after a few years, some of the killers working for Uday were able to track down the girl and they killed her along with her father, the lawyer said. Some of the waiters working in high-end clubs said that they would shrink with terror whenever Uday arrived, drunk and armed, looking for women to kidnap. A lawyer said that Uday had ordered the head of a beautiful TV presenter to be shaved so that he could keep her long strands and then kept her naked in the Olympic Committee building for a month because she opposed his request.

Muhammad Asim Shanshal, head of the private office of Uday, said, "Uday by providing all the possibilities and needs for poors, as he allocated about 40% of the Olympic Committee's revenues as the head of the Olympic Committee, as he was coordinating with the rest of the ministries to allocate 20% of each ministry to poor families... They were spreading these rape rumours to discredit him, so it was not because Uday forced any girl to engage in obscenity, but we must note that any young man in any country has certain relationships and whims. He was a young man who had connections, and he was loved by everyone, and everyone wished to accompany him, but he was a smart person, as he knew very well and with an understanding of how to identify friends. Uday used to provide everything necessary for the players from homes, cars and all means of rest and decent living. But everything that happened if any player made a mistake was reprimanded by Uday, so if the player kept repeating mistakes, he had to be punished. The penalty was to stop him from playing and not participate in the team, until he regained consciousness, and apologized, and if the player insisted on the mistake, his punishment was severe, refer to legal matter. Uday was bloody fierce in the moment only, and after he laughed and loved fun."

In the last years of the regime, the Fedayeen Saddam troops led by Uday cut off the heads of 30 prostitutes and threw them in front of their homes. A member of a guerrilla group whose duties were mainly special operations of Saddam's Fedayeen said that they assassinated figures opposed to the regime, shattering the appearance of those who were accused of hiding the truth from the government. He said, "If Uday said, cut his tongue, hands, fingers, or head, or anything, we do that. As for the penalties that do not amount to death, they were executed according to a specific system, those who steal cut their fingers and hands. Those who lie, throw heavy stones on their backs, while informants who transmit incorrect information, put hot irons in their mouths, and those who evade the army, cut their ears." When Uday wanted to kill someone, he sent a group equipped with ten photographs of the target. The process would be recorded with video or audio to demonstrate that it was carried out and Uday would maintain a set of these videotapes.

== Financial and property interests ==
It has been claimed that Uday had taken advantage of the United Nations sanctions in Iraq and built an immense wealth and influence empire. He supplied oil, cigarettes and other prohibited materials through smuggling and sold them on the black market in Iraq. He also sold alcohol and racehorses to rich Gulf countries. He opened accounts with Yahoo! and MSN Messenger, which created controversy as this allegedly violated U.S. trade sanctions against Iraq. Uday also amassed a large video collection, found in his palace in 2003, much of which featured himself in both public and private situations. In Uday's palace, a zoo with wild animals, hundreds of luxury cars, guns made from many brands of gold, hundreds of luxury alcohol brands, and hundreds of cigars with the name on it were found. At the presidential palace, in Uday's dwellings, anti-depressants, an e-mail output that "a virgin girl agrees to come to him," and another order asking for the girls to be examined for diseases were found. One of Uday's private prisons was later disclosed, and it was stated that there was everyone who bothered Uday inside, the insiders were businessmen clashing with Uday, athletes who could not win, drivers who did not yield him the right of way, and some were thrown into the same cell with German shepherd dogs and left to die. Erotic pictures of women downloaded from the internet and pictures of American president George W. Bush's twin daughters Jenna and Barbara were found on the walls of Uday's gym. In another house owned by Uday, "pornographic pictures, heroin bags, expensive liqueurs, vintage cars and HIV testing" was found. He was feeding lions and the other wild animals in his palace and often fed them with his own hands.

Abbas Al Janabi said: "He has a large number of cars. He stole around 160 cars from Kuwait. You may not believe it when I tell you that 'Uday has 1,300 luxury cars, such as Rolls Royces, Porsches, Ferraris, Range Rovers, Lincolns and others. Uday has prisons everywhere you go. He has two prisons in the presidential palace, a prison in the armory, a prison in the Olympic Committee, and a prison at his farm in the Radhwaniya compound." About his business, he said: "He controls many facets of smuggling in Iraq—whisky, tobacco, fertilizers, petrol, and other goods. His business interests extend to Turkey, Iran, and Jordan. He has also gained control of all aid going to Iraq from the United Arab Emirates. He stores this aid in warehouses owned by the Olympic Committee and only distributes a small portion of it, always in front of the press. Uday then arranges for this aid to be sold in stores, and gets the proceeds. Uday is also one of the parties who controls the U.S. dollar/dinar exchange rate and the smuggling of dollars overseas. Because of the large number of U.S. dollars he has, he can affect the movement of the exchange rate at any given time to the benefit of his commercial operations."

== Personal life ==
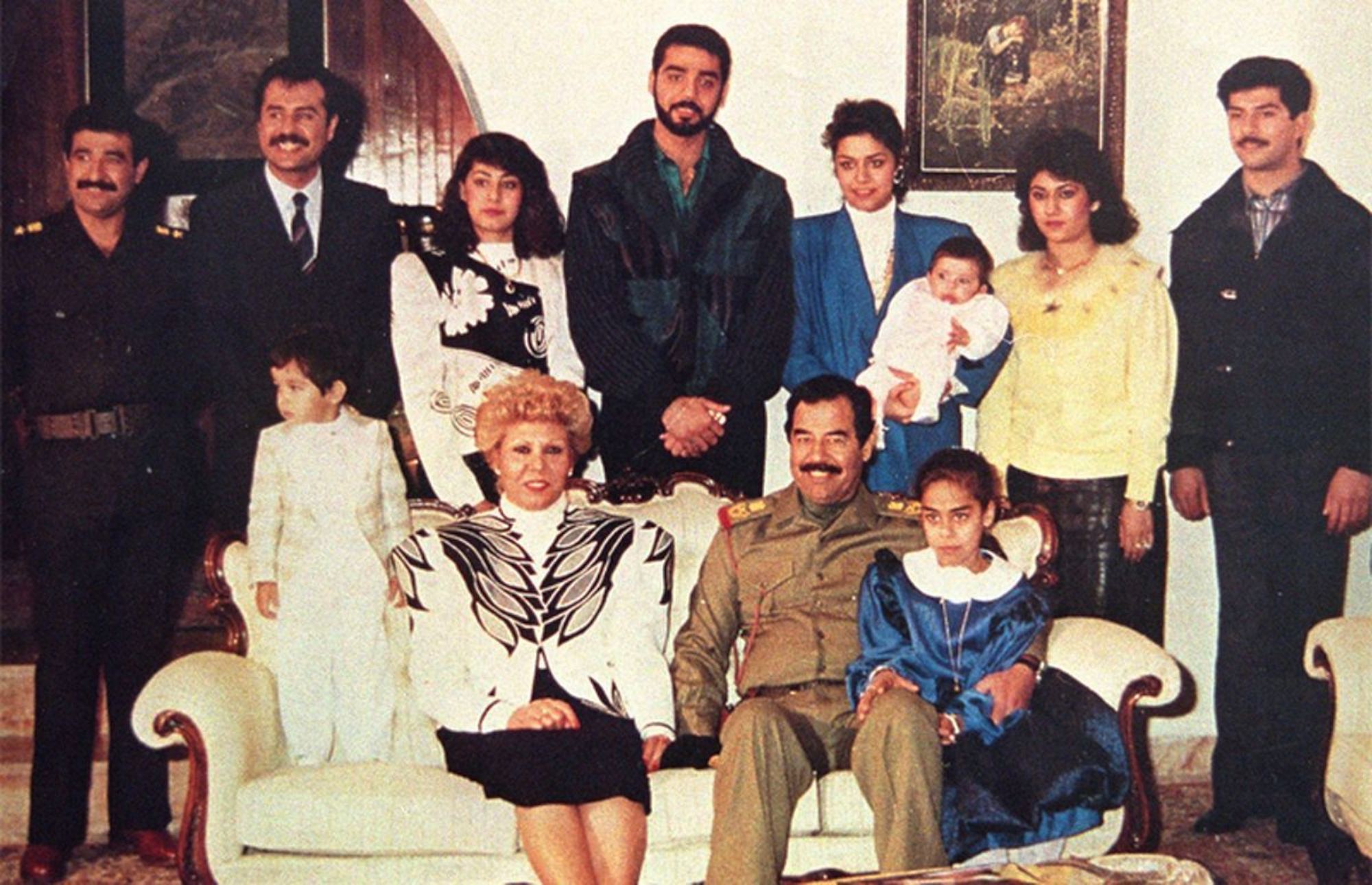
A family portrait of Saddam Hussein's family. Uday is the bearded man seen standing in the middle.

Personal accounts state Uday grew up idolizing his father, Saddam Hussein, although their relationship later became strained owing to his father's many mistresses. Uday maintained a close cordial relationship with his mother, Sajida Talfah. Generally apathetic, Uday showed a rare moment of tenderness at his uncle Adnan Khairallah's funeral in 1989.

Uday married three times. In 1983, his father arranged for him to marry Nada, the daughter of Ali Hassan al-Majid. They had two sons but later divorced. While banished in Geneva, he married Saha, the teenaged daughter of his father's half-brother Barzan Ibrahim al-Tikriti in July 1993 in a union arranged by his father. The marriage was never consummated and she deserted him three months later after she accused him of beating her during their marriage. She wrote a letter to him in 1996 professing her love despite this. He later married Suja, the daughter of Izzat Ibrahim al-Douri, who alleged that he treated her badly.

After being handicapped by the assassination attempt on him in 1996, he maintained distance from Qusay who was rising in ranks and thought to be Saddam's next legitimate successor. Uday was 6 feet 6 inches tall and athletically built, though after the assassination attempt, he was partially paralyzed and would eventually use a wheelchair in private and a walking cane in public.

His longtime secretary Abbas al Janabi said:

Uday is at times the primary cause of the internal squabbles and at others a catalyst for such squabbles within the family. The split in Saddam's family began in 1983 because of [Raghad], Saddam's oldest daughter. A nephew of Barzan was the first person to ask for her hand in marriage. Barzan was the one who went to Saddam to ask on his behalf. Saddam refused. Uday was strongly opposed to this marriage as he was influenced by his mother, Sajida, Saddam's wife and first cousin. Sajida was also the sister of Barzan's wife, but the two sisters did not get along. Barzan thought that Uday was behind Saddam's decision. When [Raghad] married the late Husayn Kamil, Barzan was enraged and the split widened. Sajida wanted Husayn Kamil, who at the time was a member of her security detail, to marry her daughter and preferred him to Barzan. Another source of the family split was Saddam's marriage to Samira Shahbandar [who became his second wife].

About the relationship with his brothers Janabi said in 1999: "Saddam has one son, Ali, from Samira Shahbandar. He is thirteen years old. He is a member of the board of an athletic club. He is treated in a special manner by his father, with many servants and bodyguards. The press does not focus on Ali because Uday does not want him to have any public role. Even though he is a director of the largest athletic club in Baghdad, Uday refuses to have any publicity surrounding his role. Uday hates him. Uday cannot tolerate his [younger full] brother Qusay, let alone Ali." About his personality, he said: "Uday was a complex personality. It has to do with his upbringing. Saddam personally took charge of bringing up his younger brother Qusay. Although Saddam also participated in bringing up Uday, he did not devote so much attention to him. It was Uday's mother and her father [Khayrallah Tulfa, Saddam's maternal uncle] who had the most influence on him. This is why we see Khayrallah Tulfa's known traits in Uday, such as the love of money, the love for taking over other people's property, violence and extremism. Uday obviously has some of his father's traits as well, but it is his maternal grandfather that seems to have influenced him as well."

In a sign of loyalty to Saddam, the vice-president of the Revolutionary Command Council Izzat al-Douri consented to marry his daughter Hawazin to Uday. However, al-Douri's influence with Saddam was so substantial that he was able to levy a condition: that the union would not be consummated. Because of Uday's violent and erratic behavior, al-Douri quickly petitioned that his daughter be permitted to divorce Uday. Uday reportedly had no children from his marriage. His third marriage was with Saja al-Tikriti, daughter of his step-uncle Barzan İbrahim al-Tikriti; that marriage soon ended as well, beginning with Saja's refusal to return to Iraq after going to Switzerland. Saja's brother said about the reason of divorce, "Uday did not beat my sister black and blue but treated her like a princess. My sister was only 16, and had different ideas about marriage. That's why they separated soon after the wedding." Dr. Alaa Bashir said: "Four days after the wedding, Uday was accompanied by a number of prostitutes in a suite at the Rasheed Hotel, which led to a new scandal in Baghdad. Saja went out to Sajida's house because her parents were in Geneva and tried unsuccessfully to persuade her uncle to agree to divorce her, but the president refused and asked her to talk to Uday about that. Uday refused to talk about the issue of divorce and told her: 'Our family does not know about divorce.'" It was alleged that Uday's first marriage was to the daughter of Saddam's cousin, Ali Hassan al-Majid. A Turkish woman named Sevim Torun claimed that she was married to Uday and had a son named Mesut Uday and published her memoir Saddam's Bride.

Uday was reported to have converted to Shia Islam from Sunni Islam in 2001, but he denied these reports.

== Allegations of crimes ==
In November 1987, Uday's alleged body double Latif Yahia said, "I saw many rapes. He raped and killed women, and then killed her parents if they complained. I witnessed many murders. Uday had raped one of the Baghdad Beauty Queens and her father complained to Saddam. He ordered me to kill him. I refused and instead cut my wrists."

A report released on 20 March 2003, one day after the American led invasion of Iraq, by ABC News detailed several allegations against Uday:

- As head of the Iraqi Olympic Committee, Uday oversaw the imprisonment and torture of Iraqi athletes who were deemed not to have performed to expectations. He would insult athletes who performed below his expectations by calling them dogs and monkeys to their faces. One defector reported that imprisoned football players were forced to kick a concrete ball after failing to reach the 1994 FIFA World Cup finals. The Iraqi national football team were seen with their heads shaved after failing to achieve a good result in a tournament in the 1980s. Another defector claimed that athletes were dragged through a gravel pit and then immersed in a sewage tank to induce infection in their wounds. After Iraq lost 4–1 to Japan in the quarter-finals of the 2000 AFC Asian Cup in Lebanon, goalkeeper Hashim Khamis, defender Abdul-Jabar Hashim and forward Qahtan Chathir were labelled as guilty of loss and eventually flogged for three days by Uday's security. Later in 2001, seven Iraqi players were also imprisoned and beaten, following a 2–0 defeat to Bahrain in the second round of AFC qualifying for the 2002 FIFA World Cup.

Other allegations include:

- Uday was known to intrude on parties and otherwise "discover" women whom he would later rape. Time published an article in 2003 detailing his sexual brutality.
- Usage of an iron maiden on persons who fell foul of him.
- Beating an army officer unconscious when the man refused to allow Uday to dance with his wife; the man later died of his injuries. Uday also shot and killed an army officer who did not salute him.
- Stealing approximately 1,200 luxury cars, including a Rolls-Royce Corniche valued at more than $200,000.
- Plotting, in 2000, to assassinate Ahmed Chalabi, the leader of the Iraqi National Congress. This was done shortly after Saddam named his younger son, Qusay, heir-apparent to the presidency. Uday allegedly intended to curry favour with his father through the assassination.

=== Sexual assault history ===
In 1987, Uday allegedly raped the 15-year-old daughter of his father's mistress Shaqraa, a Greek-Lebanese former pageant holder who was the daughter of an oil businessman. When Saddam was informed of what happened, after several hours, Uday was put in prison but released after a short period. Because the girl had not kept silent about the rape, Uday's bodyguards tortured her with electric batons with Uday present.

In 1999, an anti-embargo group of French volunteers went to Iraq and a woman was forced to stay with Uday after the party, but they were able to leave the party when one of the women said "we did not come here to be prostitutes". Miss Germany, Alexandra Vodjanikova, met with Uday and said "he was charming, downright warm, very friendly and always said to her 'you are beautiful, you are sexy'".

One of his former classmates, Aziz Al-Taee, said:

There was a lot of fear in the female students that the guy had a tradition of choosing the most beautiful woman and trying to force her to date him then the most cases he will exclude her or that's one of his bodyguards to kill her after he rape her. So there was a lot of fear when he was coming to College.

Zainab Salbi, daughter of Saddam Hussein's private pilot said, "The days when Uday came to the university, the girls were hiding in the toilet in fear to escape from his hungry eyes, but it is a known fact that nobody can escape from the lust of Uday and Uday is known for his eerie quietness than for wild craziness." One of his long-time employees, Khaled Jassem, said:

You shouldn't compete with Uday on two subjects: business and girls. Often, he would make his decisions under the influence of the drink a cocktail based on whiskey, gin and champagne. I have never seen someone so cruel. My life was a nightmare. I was always afraid. I have suffered foot whipping as punishment four times. When he could not attend the caning, he sent his executioners to administer it. But not wanting to deprive himself of the pleasure of hearing the victim's pain, he listened the victim shouting over the telephone.

According to a former employee, Uday would party five nights a week and fast for the remaining two days. The chief of the Baghdad Hunting Club claimed that after a wedding party in the late 1990s, the bride suddenly disappeared, Uday's bodyguards locked all the doors, and the groom committed suicide. Again, according to the allegations of Uday's servant, he witnessed forced custody of a crying bride at home in October 2002 and later said that the girl was killed, and her body was destroyed after she was raped. When the city was about to fall to US-led forces, it was alleged that Uday ordered Fedayeen Saddam to burn his cars instead of letting others take their cars. Former business manager Adib Shabaan said that Uday burned the hips of many women with whom he had sex with a horseshoe, creating a U-shaped scar. Alaa Bashir, the doctor of the Saddam family, claimed that he was treating women who were in the same condition and who had been burned with a lit cigarette by Uday.

Adeeb al-Ani, who was Uday's secretary, said:

Uday wanted a different woman every night and had them kidnapped, usually very young girls, but also women from wealthy Baghdad families. They would all be paid as if they were prostitutes.

Uday's assistant, Adib Shabaan, said: "In 1998, Uday saw an ex-governor's 14-year-old daughter at a party, had her kidnapped, sent her home after three days, and when the girl's father was informed about the rape and talked about what happened, Uday told the man, 'Your daughters will be my girlfriends, or I will erase you from the earth,' and ordered the man to bring his daughter and his other 12-year-old daughter to his next party." According to a former employee, "Five nights a week, two dozen girls, all brought to him by his friends, were taken to the luxurious Baghdad Boat Club on the Tigris coast to meet Uday; those who were chosen after drinks, music, and dance would spend the night with Uday". "He never slept with a girl more than three times," said an ex-butler. If a friend used the same brand of clothes, perfumes, or shoes as Uday, Uday would threaten his friend not to use the same thing again. A family friend said that the day Uday discovered the Internet was "a black day for the Iraqis", and he had employees whose job was to investigate new methods of torture and new car models on the Internet. In the Boat Club's kitchen there was a monkey named Louisa, and if one of Uday's friends fell asleep at parties because of alcohol, he would put them in the same cage with the drunk monkey.

According to one of Uday's close circle, "If the girl he chose did not want Uday, if she found another boyfriend or was late or reluctant, she would have to dance after getting her feet whipped." Again, according to a friend's claim, Uday would make fun of the girls who lost their virginity because he knew that no one would touch them later and would say, "She will have to be a prostitute from now on." Again, one of his employees said, "He had a secretary hunting the girls – in universities, ministries. They even had a bedroom in the Olympic offices for women brought to him. They generally agreed to sleep with him. They had no other choice."

He had allegations against him as recently as early March 2003, shortly before the invasion, when a 13-year-old girl said she accompanied her older sister to Jadriea Equestrian Club, which he frequented. She alleged that she was taken by his bouncers to a back room and raped by him, in which she was given 250,000 Iraqi dinars (about $200).

==== Body double allegations ====
In his memoir, I was Saddam's Son, Uday's alleged body double Latif Yahia said that he witnessed rapes, killings and torture by Uday Hussein. Yahia claimed that in 1987, he was forced to be Uday's body double, even going through plastic surgery to resemble him more. He claimed he was tortured when he initially refused and eventually caved. According to Yahia, Uday raped a Palestinian girl who was selling flowers in the Al-Rashid Hotel, and later raped and murdered a deaf girl in Nineveh. Uday also ordered the kidnapping of Ilham Ali al-Aazami, Miss Iraq, after she had rejected him. Uday and his bodyguards subsequently held her captive and raped her for weeks, and started the rumor that she was a prostitute, causing her to be killed by her father. When the father confronted Uday, the latter spoke disparagingly about the girl, causing the father to lose control to the point of first verbally accosting and ultimately physically assailing Uday. This prompted Uday to order Latif to shoot the father — rather than acquiesce, Latif instead refused and attempted to commit suicide. Ultimately the father was murdered by one of Uday's bodyguards. On another occasion, Uday attacked a newlywed couple and raped the bride in the al-Medina Hotel. She then committed suicide by throwing herself off the balcony. Her husband, a lieutenant, was later killed for "insulting the president".

Irish Times journalist Eoin Butler and Sunday Times journalist Ed Caesar have questioned Yahia's various claims, including that he was Uday Hussein's body double, and pointed out that many of Yahia's activities since leaving Iraq in 1992, including his education, have not been verified. Individuals close to Yahia and Hussein denied that the former was the latter's body-double, or denied that Hussein had even had a body double. Yahia disputes these claims, stating that his very existence as a body double was a state secret.

== Statements before 2003 ==
In July 2002, the Iraqi newspaper Babel, owned by Uday Hussein, published an article by "Abu Hatim" (an alias used by Uday) which claimed that the American administration was planning to strike Iraq and exert political control in the Middle East. It stated the plans "will extend to include everything", "starting from making Jordan an alternative homeland for the Palestinians, "dividing Saudi Arabia into at least three parts and obliterating Bahrain's identity by returning it as part of Persia.

In September 2002, Uday threatened that "the heads of the Americans, the British and others will fly if they try to approach the borders of Iraq, with the aim of invading it." During his meeting with a number of delegations of Arab youth, Uday claimed the Americans who are now allied with them are "Saddam Hussein and his family." He added, "This is the pride of the family. Uday and Qusay said that it is God's will ... In any case, that is better than targeting the infrastructure and sabotaging the electricity, water, communications and other networks. Uday considered that the undeclared goal of the American war against Iraq is to control Iraq's oil and reserves, which he said is "number one in the world, and they do not say it, they do not say that the war is for oil." He added that the last barrel of oil "on the face of the Earth ... will be a barrel of Iraqi oil. They (the Americans) separated Northern Iraq in this damned way, because the north has uranium, gold and other materials in it."

Uday responded to the accusations of British Prime Minister Tony Blair against Iraq, that the latter "if his hands and feet were wrapped and put on a bear, he would have nodded evil with his head, and even if he put his head between the jaws of iron and wood pincers and squeezed the head between the jaws of the pincers, his eyes would still move and gesture to evil." Uday stressed the "strength" of the home front, and that "the enemy will meet what it does, if he tries to harm Iraq."

== Death ==
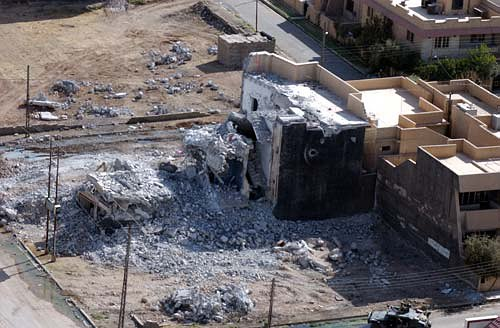
House of Uday and Qusay in Mosul, Iraq, destroyed by U.S. forces, 31 July 2003

During the Iraq War, Saddam Hussein's closest aide and personal secretary, Abid Hamid Mahmud, had been captured, and told his interrogators that he and Saddam's two sons had sought refuge in Syria but were turned back.

On the night of 21 July 2003, Nawaf al-Zaidan, who had been sheltering Uday, Qusay, Mustafa and their bodyguard Abdul-Samad in his mansion in the Falah neighbourhood of northeastern Mosul, left the villa and went to a nearby 101st Airborne base to turn in the two sons owing to the combined $30 million reward. "He was nervous, I could tell, more nervous than anybody else I've seen dealing with it. Yet he had confidence in what he said. More than most of the other people," the 23-year-old American military intelligence sergeant who interviewed al-Zaidan told 60 Minutes II. "He had exact locations. He also could tell very good descriptions on Qusay and Uday as well, their habits. He told me what exactly they looked like." Al-Zaidan then passed a lie detector test, which was interpreted as a definitive validation of his story.

On the morning of 22 July 2003, JSOC Task Force 20, aided by troops of the United States Army 101st Airborne Division, surrounded Uday, Qusay, and Qusay's 14-year-old son Mustafa during a raid on a home in the northern Iraqi city of Mosul. Acting on a tip from al-Zaidan, soldiers from the 101st Airborne Division provided security while the Task Force 20 operators tried to capture the inhabitants of the house. As many as 200 American troops, later aided by OH-58 Kiowa helicopters, surrounded and fired upon the house, killing Uday, Qusay, and Qusay's son. After approximately five hours of battle, soldiers entered the house and found four bodies, including the Hussein brothers' bodyguard.

Soldiers, who tried to enter the house three times, encountered resistance with AK-47 and grenades in the first two attempts. Uday, Qusay, and the guard took up positions in a bathroom at the front of the building, where they had a line of fire on the streets and on steps leading up to the first floor; Qusay's son took cover in the bedroom in the back and defended himself. The American forces then bombed the house many times and fired missiles. The three adults were thought to have died from a TOW missile fired into the front of the house. In the third attempt, the soldiers killed Mustafa after he fired. Mustafa had been the last one to die in the five-hour siege and kept shooting even after Qusay and Uday had been killed, US military officials said.

Brigade commander Colonel Joe Anderson said an Arabic announcement was made at 10:00 a.m. on the day and called on people inside to come out peacefully. The answer he received was bullet bombardment. An experienced team of special forces tried to attack the building, but they had to retreat under fire. Four American soldiers were injured. Anderson then ordered his men to fire with 50-caliber heavy machine guns. Uday and Qusay refused to surrender even after a helicopter fired a rocket and the Strike Brigade fired 40 mm grenades at them. Anderson decided that more firepower was necessary to take down the brothers, leading to 12 TOW missiles being fired into the building.

Later, the American command said that dental records had conclusively identified two of the dead men as Saddam Hussein's sons. They also announced that the informant would receive the combined $30 million reward previously offered for their apprehension.

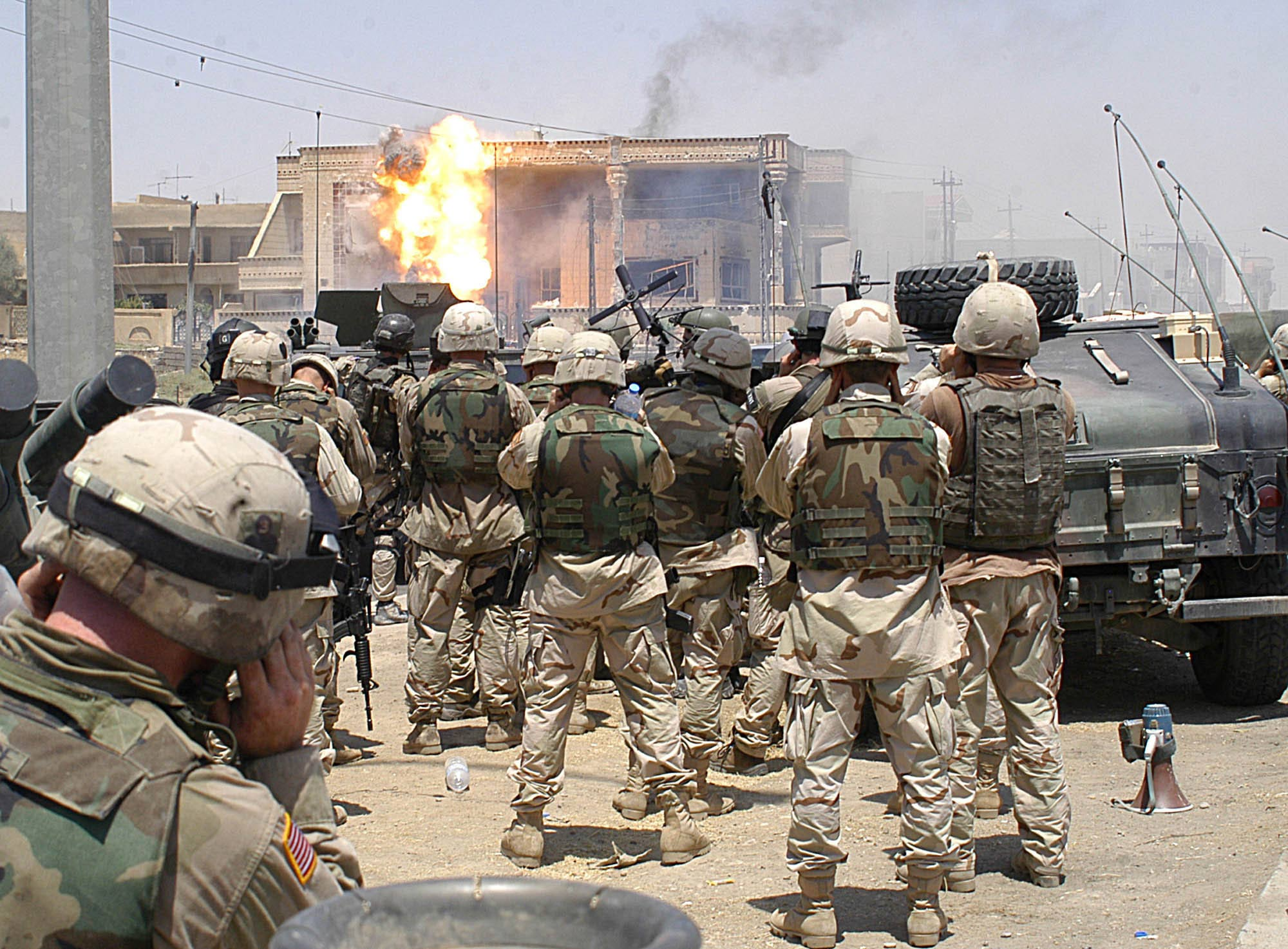
Soldiers of the 101st Airborne Division and U.S. Special Operations (Task Force 20) watch as a TOW missile strikes the side of a house occupied by Uday and Qusay Hussein in Mosul, on 22 July 2003.

According to Saddam Hussein's memoirs, when he learned about the death of his sons and grandson, the first thing he asked was, "Did they fight?" When he got the answer "Yes", then he said, "Good! Praise be to God, who honored me with their martyrdom and defense of their homeland."

After his sons' deaths, Saddam Hussein recorded a tape and said:

"Beloved Iraqis, your brothers Uday and Qusay, and Mustafa, the son of Qusay, took a stand of faith, which pleases God, makes a friend happy, and makes an enemy angry. They stood in the arena of jihad in Mosul, after a valiant battle with the enemy that lasted six hours. The armies of aggression mobilised all types of weapons of the ground forces against them and succeeded to harm them only when they used planes against the house where they were. Thus, they adopted a stand with which God has honoured this Hussein family so that the present would be a continuation of the brilliant, genuine, faithful, and honourable past. We thank God for what he has ordained for us when he honoured us with their martyrdom for his sake. We ask Almighty God to satisfy them and all the righteous martyrs after they satisfied him with their faithful Jihadist stand. Had Saddam Hussein had 100 children, other than Uday and Qusay, Saddam Hussein would have sacrificed them on the same path God honoured us by their martyrdom. If you had killed Uday, Qusay, Mustafa, and another mujahideen man with them, all the youths of our nation and the youths of Iraq are Uday, Qusay, and Mustafa in the fields of jihad."

During Saddam's interrogation, when George Piro started asking questions about Uday, Piro said, "I was surprised. He didn't show any remorse (about his son's death). He told me that he was, of course, proud of his sons. They died believing, or fighting, for what they believed. I pressed him until Saddam didn't want to hear anymore (the rumors about Uday). He tells me to stop. Basically stop asking these questions. You don't get to pick your kids. You're kind of stuck with what you get." During a different interrogation, when CIA analyst John Nixon confronted Saddam with the rumor that he and Samira had a son named Ali, Saddam painfully said, "If I told you yes, would you kill him like you killed Uday and Qusay?" Saddam also told Nixon he had learned of his sons' deaths through BBC radio.

Newsweek claimed that the contents of Uday Hussein's briefcase consisted of Viagra, numerous bottles of cologne, unopened packages of men's underwear, dress shirts, a silk tie and a single condom. The money found with the former Iraqi leader's sons was more than three times the $30 million bounty on their heads by the US Government. They had about $100 million in Iraqi dinars and US dollars. Some claimed Nawaf al-Zaidan, who owned the villa where the men were hiding, had tipped off the Americans to their presence after reportedly sheltering them for 23 days.

The others claimed that Uday and Qusay were tracked down after Uday made a telephone call to an associate that was tracked by the US Central Intelligence Agency. Then the brother of Nawaf, Salah al-Zaidan, was shot dead by gunmen while Nawaf was thought to have fled Iraq. According to a former bodyguard for Uday Hussein, after the fall of Baghdad, they planned a guerrilla resistance and Saddam and his sons lived separately in Baghdad after the American occupation, changing houses every two or three days. But Uday continued to drive through the city in nondescript vehicles, and always with a machine pistol, according to the bodyguard. He said Saddam and his sons had been moving freely around Baghdad, often with astonishingly little effort to hide themselves during the war.

At one stage, Uday had driven past a convoy of US soldiers, looking at their faces and quietly insulting the men who now controlled his country. During the war, Uday forsook the alcohol and womanising and concentrated his energies on directing the Fedayeen Saddam.

The U.S. Administration released graphic pictures of the Hussein brothers' bodies. Both brothers had grown long beards to avoid detection, with Uday shaving his head. Afterwards, their bodies were reconstructed by morticians to assure the public that they were deceased. For example, Uday's beard was trimmed, his nose was repaired, facial gashes from the battle were removed and an 8-inch metal bar in his leg from the 1996 assassination attempt was removed. Both he and Qusay were embalmed. When criticized, the U.S. military's response was to point out that these men were no ordinary combatants, and to express hope that confirmation of the deaths would bring closure to the Iraqi people. Uday is buried in a cemetery in his hometown of Al-Awja near Tikrit, alongside Qusay and Mustafa. In 2017, his alleged son Massoud claimed that the Iranian government stole his body although this was unproven.

== In film, television, and theatre ==
Philip Arditti portrayed Uday in the docudrama television miniseries House of Saddam. He and Latif were portrayed by Dominic Cooper in The Devil's Double, based on Latif's memoirs, I was Saddam's Son, but according to Latif had only been "20% of the truth". Hrach Titizian portrayed him in the play Bengal Tiger at the Baghdad Zoo. Sam Vincenti portrayed him in the Locked Up Abroad TV-series, in the 2013 episode "Son of Saddam".

In the 1999 movie Deterrence, Uday is depicted as Saddam's successor. A reference to Uday is made on the American The Office TV series, in the 2011 episode "Dwight K. Schrute, (Acting) Manager".

Uday is referenced in the Arrested Development episode "Exit Strategy" (2005), where a Saddam Hussein lookalike exclaims that "I am behaving like an Uday lookalike."

Uday and Qusay are referenced during a sketch in The Eric Andre Show's 2020 episode, "The 50th Episode!".

Uday is referenced in the first episode of Netflix's Tires.
