= List of programs broadcast by AMC =

This is a list of television programs broadcast by AMC.

== Current programming ==
=== Drama ===
| Title | Genre | Premiere | Seasons | Runtime | Status |
|---|---|---|---|---|---|
| The Terror (Note: Season 3 first premiered on AMC+ and Shudder.) | Supernatural horror drama anthology | March 25, 2018 | 3 seasons, 26 episodes | 40–56 min | Pending |
| Dark Winds | Psychological thriller | June 12, 2022 | 4 seasons, 28 episodes | 39–53 min | Season 5 due to premiere in 2027 |
| The Vampire Lestat (Note: Titled Interview with the Vampire for seasons 1–2.) | Gothic horror | October 2, 2022 | 3 seasons, 22 episodes | 41–66 min | Renewed |
| Mayfair Witches | Supernatural thriller | January 8, 2023 | 2 seasons, 16 episodes | 40–60 min | Season 3 due to premiere on December 30, 2026 |
| The Walking Dead: Dead City | Horror drama | June 18, 2023 | 3 seasons, 22 episodes | 39–50 min | Pending |
| The Walking Dead: Daryl Dixon | Horror drama | September 10, 2023 | 3 seasons, 19 episodes | 48–64 min | Final season due to premiere in February 2027 |
| The Audacity | Drama | April 12, 2026 | 1 season, 8 episodes | 56–67 min | Season 2 due to premiere in 2027 |

=== Unscripted ===
==== Docuseries ====
| Title | Subject | Premiere | Seasons | Runtime | Status |
|---|---|---|---|---|---|
| Show Me More (Note: AMC.com and AMC+ exclusive) | Making-of | October 20, 2021 | 25 episodes | 30 min | Pending |

==== Variety ====
| Title | Genre | Premiere | Seasons | Runtime | Status |
|---|---|---|---|---|---|
| The Vampire Lestat: After Dark | Aftershow | May 24, 2026 | 1 season, 8 episodes | 25–34 min | Pending |

=== Co-productions ===
| Title | Genre | Partner/Country | Premiere | Seasons | Runtime | Status |
|---|---|---|---|---|---|---|
| Gangs of London (Note: AMC+ exclusive) (Note: AMC became a co-production partner with Sky Atlantic for the second season onward. The first season was a co-production between Sky Atlantic and Cinemax.) | Action crime drama | Sky Atlantic/United Kingdom | April 4, 2021 | 3 seasons, 25 episodes | 41–93 min | Renewed |

=== Professional wrestling ===
| Title | Genre | Premiere | Runtime | Status |
|---|---|---|---|---|
| TNA Thursday Night Impact! | Professional wrestling | January 15, 2026 | 2 hours (approx.) | Ongoing |

=== Acquired programming ===
- Sanctuary: A Witch's Tale (2025)
- The Assassin (2025)
- Kill Jackie (2026)
- Yaga (2026)

== Upcoming programming ==
=== Drama ===
| Title | Genre | Premiere | Seasons | Runtime | Status |
|---|---|---|---|---|---|
| Thunder Road | Sports drama | 2027 | TBA | TBA | Series order |

=== Comedy ===
| Title | Genre | Premiere | Seasons | Runtime | Status |
|---|---|---|---|---|---|
| Happy Jack | Comedy | 2027 | 1 season, 6 episodes | TBA | Series order |

=== Unscripted ===
==== Docuseries ====
| Title | Genre | Premiere | Seasons | Runtime | Status |
|---|---|---|---|---|---|
| Rise of the Saints | Sports | February 2027 | TBA | TBA | Series order |

=== Co-productions ===
| Title | Genre | Partner/Country | Premiere | Seasons | Runtime | Status |
|---|---|---|---|---|---|---|
| Bannerman | Spy thriller | Netflix | TBA | TBA | TBA | Series order |
| Point Break | Action thriller | Canal+/France | TBA | 1 season, 8 episodes | TBA | Series order |

=== In development ===
- Black Vault
- Down by the River
- Gothictown
- Great American Stories
- Memnoch the Devil
- The New Gothic
- Night Island
- Say Hello to My Little Friend

== Former programming ==
=== Drama ===
- Broken Trail (2006)
- Mad Men (2007–15)
- Breaking Bad (2008–13)
- Rubicon (2010)
- The Walking Dead (2010–22)
- The Killing (2011–13) (Note: Seasons 1–3 only. Moved to Netflix for season 4.)
- Hell on Wheels (2011–16)
- Low Winter Sun (2013)
- TURИ: Washington's Spies (2014–17)
- Halt and Catch Fire (2014–17)
- Better Call Saul (2015–22)
- Fear the Walking Dead (2015–23)
- Into the Badlands (2015–19)
- Preacher (2016–19)
- Feed the Beast (2016)
- The Son (2017–19)
- Dietland (2018)
- Lodge 49 (2018–19)
- NOS4A2 (2019–20)
- Dispatches from Elsewhere (2020)
- The Walking Dead: World Beyond (2020–21)
- Soulmates (2020)
- Firebite (2021–22)
- That Dirty Black Bag (2022)
- 61st Street (2022) (Note: Season 1 only. Moved to The CW for season 2.)
- Moonhaven (2022)
- Tales of the Walking Dead (2022)
- The Walking Dead: The Ones Who Live (2024)
- Parish (2024)
- Orphan Black: Echoes (2024)
- Snowpiercer (2024) (Note: Season 4 only. Previously aired on TNT for seasons 1–3.)
- Talamasca: The Secret Order (2025)

=== Comedy ===
- Remember WENN (1996–98)
- The Lot (1999–2001)
- Kevin Can F**k Himself (2021–22)
- Cooper's Bar (2022) (Note: Season 1 only. Moved to IFC for season 2.)
- Lucky Hank (2023)

=== Animation ===
- Ultra City Smiths (2021)
- Slippin' Jimmy (2022)
- Pantheon (2022) (Note: Season 1 only. Moved to Amazon Prime Video for season 2.)

=== Unscripted ===
==== Docuseries ====
- Movies That Shook the World (2005)
- The Making of the Mob (2015–16)
- The American West (2016)
- Ride with Norman Reedus (2016–25)
- Robert Kirkman's Secret History of Comics (2017)
- James Cameron's Story of Science Fiction (2018)
- Eli Roth's History of Horror (2018–21)
- True Terror with George Takei (2019)
- Hip Hop: The Songs That Shook America (2019)
- The Preppy Murders: Death in Central Park (2019)
- You Are Here (2023)
- Rise of the 49ers (2026)

==== Reality ====
- The Movie Masters (1989–90)
- Cinema Secrets (2001–03)
- FilmFakers (2004)
- Celebrity Charades (2005)
- Comic Book Men (2012–18)
- The Pitch (2012–13)
- Small Town Security (2012–14)
- Freakshow (2013–14)
- Immortalized (2013)
- Owner's Manual (2013)
- Showville (2013)
- Game of Arms (2014)
- 4th and Loud (2014)

==== Variety ====
- DVD TV (2002–08)
- Shootout (2003–08)
- Talking Dead (2011–22)
- Talking Bad (2013)
- Talking Saul (2016–22)
- Talking Preacher (2016–17)
- Geeking Out (2016)
- Talking with Chris Hardwick (2017)
- Unapologetic with Aisha Tyler (2018)
- Friday Night In with the Morgans (2020)

=== Co-productions ===
- Hustle (2006–12) (Note: Co-production with BBC One. AMC became a co-production partner for seasons 3–8.)
- The Prisoner (2009) (Note: Co-production with ITV.)
- Humans (2015–18) (Note: Co-production with Channel 4.)
- The Night Manager (2016) (Note: Co-production with BBC One.) (Note: Season 1 only. Moved to Amazon Prime Video for seasons 2–3.)
- Loaded (2017)
- McMafia (2018)
- The Little Drummer Girl (2018)
- Quiz (2020)
- Happy Valley (2021–23) (Note: Co-production with BBC One. AMC became a co-production partner for season 3.)
- Ragdoll (2021) (Note: Co-production with Alibi.)
- La Fortuna (2022) (Note: Co-production with Movistar+.)
- This Is Going to Hurt (2022)
- Monsieur Spade (2024) (Note: Co-production with Canal+.)

=== Acquired programming ===
- This Is Your Life (1988)
- The Three Stooges (1998–2004; 2009)
- Dallas (2007)
- CSI: Miami (2012)
- Rawhide (2012)
- The Rifleman (2013–15)
- Orphan Black (2015–17)
- M*A*S*H (2017)
- Blue Planet II (2018)
- Dynasties (2019–22)
- Two and a Half Men (2019–22)
- Killing Eve (2019–22)
- A Discovery of Witches (2019–22) (Note: Season 3 exclusive to AMC+.)
- Seven Worlds, One Planet (2020)
- Line of Duty (2020) (Note: Seasons 1–3 only.)
- Creepshow (2020–23)
- The Salisbury Poisonings (2021)
- Cold Courage (2021)
- Spy City (2021)
- Weird Wonders of the World (2021)
- Too Close (2021)
- The Beast Must Die (2021)
- The North Water (2021)
- Eden: Untamed Planet (2021)
- Kin (2021)
- Broke (2021)
- Anna (2021)
- Anne Boleyn (2021)
- Horror Noire (2022) (Note: Originally released as a feature-length film on Shudder which was split into six episodes for AMC.)
- The Ipcress File (2022)
- Slo Pitch (2022)
- Documentary Now! (2022) (Note: Season 4 only.)
- Sherman's Showcase (2022) (Note: Season 2 only.)
- BlackBerry (2023) (Note: Originally a theatrically released film which was split into three episodes for AMC.)
- Nautilus (2025)
