= Shipmate (disambiguation) =

A shipmate is a member on one's own ship.

Shipmate or shipmates may also refer to:

- Shipmate (company), an American order fulfillment company
- Shipmate (magazine), a magazine of the United States Naval Academy Alumni Association
- Shipmates (film), a 1931 film
- Shipmates (TV series), a 2001 American TV series
- Shipmates Forever, a 1935 film
