= Talking Bad =

Television series

- Genre: Talk show
- Directed by: Carrie Havel (7 episodes); Mike Corey (1 episode)
- Presented by: Chris Hardwick
- Country of origin: United States
- Original language: English
- No. of seasons: 1
- No. of episodes: 8

Production
- Executive producers: Michael Davies; Jen Kelly Patton; Brandon Monk; Chris Mundy
- Production companies: Embassy Row; Sony Pictures Television; AMC Studios

Original release
- Network: AMC
- Release: August 11 – September 29, 2013

Related
- Breaking Bad

Talking Bad is a television aftershow hosted by Chris Hardwick that discussed episodes of the AMC television series Breaking Bad. Eight episodes were broadcast live from August 11 to September 29, 2013. Guests featured on the show included cast and crew members from Breaking Bad, celebrity fans, and members from a live audience.

== Broadcast and format ==
Following the success of Talking Dead, which serves as a companion to The Walking Dead franchise, AMC created similar after-shows to accompany other original programming on the network; the first of these was Talking Bad. The series premiered on August 11, 2013, following the encore presentation of the midseason premiere of Breaking Bad's fifth season. Episodes continued airing following new episodes of Breaking Bad. Talking Bad concluded its run on September 29, 2013, with an extended one-hour episode directly following the series finale.

The series features host Chris Hardwick discussing the latest episode with guests who are fans of the series, including the cast and crew from Breaking Bad. On hosting the show, Hardwick commented:

Breaking Bad will go down as one of the best shows in television history. Obviously, it's tonally much different than The Walking Dead, and I will strive to give Breaking Bad the send-off it deserves. I am honored to be able to give fans a peek behind the curtain for the last eight episodes so we can all say goodbye to it together. AMC will tell you that it's because of the success of Talking Dead or my friendship with the BB cast that they asked me to host this, but I maintain it probably has more to do with my unmistakable resemblance to Jesse Pinkman, BITCH.

The show uses a logo and theme music similar to Talking Dead. Episodes aired at 11:00 pm eastern time, and ran at 30 minutes (including commercials), with an online bonus segment following each televised episode. The final episode ran at 60 minutes, at 10:15 pm eastern following the final episode of Breaking Bad. Segments on Talking Bad include "Respect the Chemistry," a "periodic table character study", a "fix" from executive producer/creator Vince Gilligan for the following episode, an online poll, and episode trivia. Questions were also taken from fans via phone, Facebook, Twitter, Reddit, or from the official Talking Bad website.

== Episodes ==
No.	Episode discussed	Guests	Original release date	U.S. viewers (millions)
1	"Blood Money"	Vince Gilligan and Julie Bowen	August 11, 2013	1.19
"Superfan" Julie Bowen from Modern Family discusses her ideas and theories on the show and the evolution of the characters with show creator Vince Gilligan and host Chris Hardwick.
2	"Buried"	Aaron Paul and Anna Gunn	August 18, 2013	1.03
Bill Hader was supposed to be a guest alongside Anna Gunn in this episode, but dropped out when Aaron Paul became available. Hader instead appeared alongside Dean Norris on the September 15 show to discuss "Ozymandias".
3	"Confessions"	Bob Odenkirk and Samuel L. Jackson	August 25, 2013	N/A
Bob Odenkirk and Samuel L. Jackson help discuss "Confessions."
4	"Rabid Dog"	Betsy Brandt and RJ Mitte	September 1, 2013	N/A
"Rabid Dog" is discussed with Betsy Brant and RJ Mitte as guests.
5	"To'hajiilee"	Bryan Cranston, Don Cheadle and Steven Michael Quezada	September 8, 2013	1.04
Bryan Cranston appears via satellite from New York.
6	"Ozymandias"	Dean Norris and Bill Hader	September 15, 2013	1.22
Norris discusses his last day on the set of Breaking Bad.
7	"Granite State"	Adam Scott, Matt L. Jones and Bryan Johnson	September 22, 2013	1.00
Discussion of the show's penultimate episode.
8	"Felina"	Vince Gilligan, Aaron Paul, Anna Gunn, RJ Mitte, Giancarlo Esposito, Jonathan Banks and Jimmy Kimmel	September 29, 2013	4.43
An extended one-hour episode that aired directly after the Breaking Bad series finale at 10:15 pm ET.

== See also ==
- Talking Dead – a similar talk show hosted by Hardwick which discusses episodes of The Walking Dead and Fear the Walking Dead.
- Talking Saul – a similar talk show hosted by Hardwick which discusses select episodes of Better Call Saul.
- Talking Preacher – a similar talk show hosted by Hardwick which discusses select episodes of Preacher.
- Talking with Chris Hardwick – a similar talk show hosted by Hardwick that features him interviewing guests from the world of pop culture.
