= Ed Sanders (TV personality) =

English carpenter, actor and television host

Edward Sanders
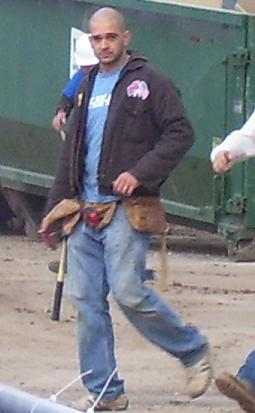
- Sanders working on a house in Fond du Lac, Wisconsin.
- Born: 10 May 1975 (age 51); Wimbledon, London, England
- Occupations: Carpenter; Actor; Host

Ed Sanders (born 10 May 1975) is an English carpenter, actor, and television host.

Sanders was born in Wimbledon, London. He learned carpentry at his father's behest to help keep himself employed between acting jobs.

In 1999, he landed the role of Eddie Moliano in the Sky1 series Dream Team. He was a reporter for the morning show RI:SE, and eventually became host of the UK version of Fear Factor.

== Move to the United States ==
In 2004, Sanders moved to the U.S. with his wife and son. He was hired to work as a carpenter and designer on Extreme Makeover: Home Edition, where he was severely injured, slicing through his hand, nearly severing his thumb, back in the Thomas family episode in Ohio from season 4. After months of surgery and therapy, he returned to the show in the Westbrook family episode in Oklahoma from season 4.

During the summer of 2007, Sanders hosted the six-episode run of National Bingo Night on ABC.

On 15 August 2013, AMC debuted the new reality show Owner's Manual hosted by Ed Sanders and Marcus Hunt.

== Limey Yank Productions ==
In 2006, Sanders started Limey Yank Productions, a creative production company, with American writer Whit Honea. The company name is a play on the slang terms "Limey" due to Sanders being British, and "Yank" as Honea is from the U.S.

== Personal life ==
Sanders's wife, Gioia (née Gagliano), an Italian-American magazine and fashion-show make-up artist, gave birth to triplet daughters on May 5, 2007, in Santa Monica, California. The couple also has a son, born in 2002.
