= Chris Hardwick =

American comedian and actor (born 1971)

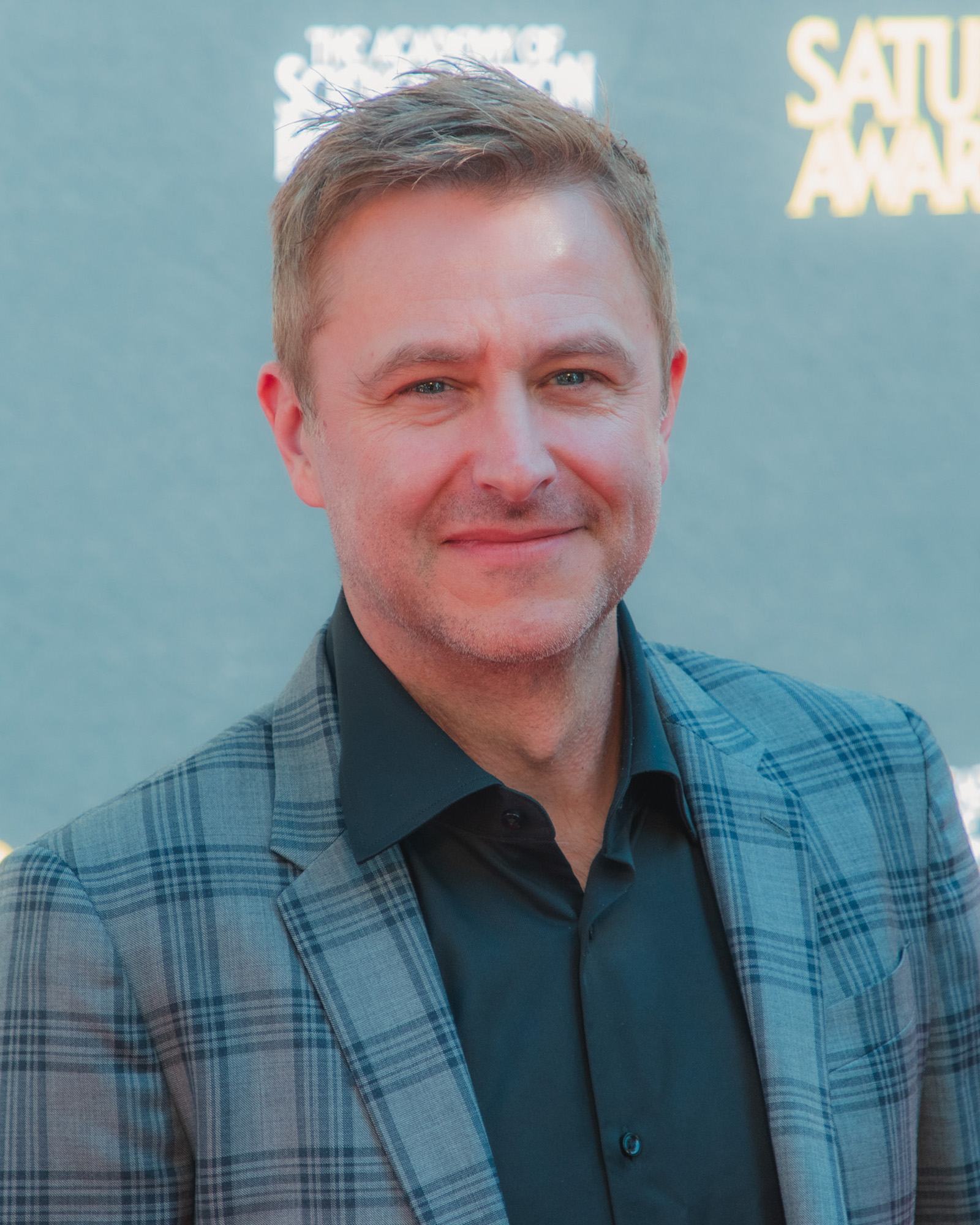
- Hardwick in 2026
- Born: Christopher Ryan Hardwick; November 23, 1971 (age 54); Louisville, Kentucky, U.S.
- Education: University of California, Los Angeles
- Occupations: Comedian; actor; television host; podcast host; writer; producer
- Spouse: Lydia Hearst (m. 2016)
- Children: 1

Comedy career
- Years active: 1991–present
- Medium: Stand-up; podcast; television; film
- Genres: Observational comedy; blue comedy; sarcasm; musical comedy; self-deprecation; satire
- Subjects: American culture; American politics; human behavior; pop culture; current events

Christopher Ryan Hardwick (born November 23, 1971) is an American comedian, actor, television and podcast host, writer, and producer. He hosted Talking Dead, an hourlong aftershow on AMC affiliated with the network's zombie drama series The Walking Dead and Fear the Walking Dead, as well as Talking with Chris Hardwick, a show in which Hardwick interviews prominent pop culture figures, and The Wall, a plinko-inspired gameshow on NBC. Hardwick created Nerdist Industries, operator of the Nerdist Podcast Network and home of his podcast The Nerdist Podcast, which later left the network and was renamed to ID10T with Chris Hardwick and after a three-year hiatus returned as I Think You're Overthinking It. His podcast had broadcast 1,145 episodes as of June 2025.

From 2011, he hosted the BBC America Britcom block Ministry of Laughs. From 2013 to 2017, he hosted @midnight with Chris Hardwick, a nightly comedy-game show series on Comedy Central. In 2013, he hosted Talking Bad, a live half-hour talk show on AMC following the final eight episodes of Breaking Bad. From 2016, he hosted Talking Saul for the Breaking Bad spin-off Better Call Saul. He is also known for performing with Mike Phirman in the musical comedy duo Hard 'n Phirm, as well as hosting Singled Out, Wired Science, and Web Soup, the voice of Glowface on The X's, the voice of Otis the Cow in Back at the Barnyard, and the voice of Craig the Snake in Sanjay and Craig.

== Early life ==
Christopher Ryan Hardwick was born in Louisville, Kentucky, on November 23, 1971, the son of Billy Hardwick (1941–2013), a professional ten-pin bowler, and Sharon Hills (née Facente), a real estate agent in Pasadena, California. His maternal grandfather was Italian-American, and opened a bowling alley where Hardwick's parents first met. Hardwick was raised in his mother's Roman Catholic faith. At age four, he met comedian Joan Rivers and they became lifelong friends. Hardwick grew up in Memphis, Tennessee, where he was the 1983 Memphis City Junior High Chess Champion. He later attended St. Benedict at Auburndale before moving to Regis Jesuit High School in Aurora, Colorado, and spent his senior year at Loyola High School in Los Angeles. He studied philosophy at UCLA, where he was a member of Chi Phi fraternity during his freshman year and graduated in 1993. He was roommates with Wil Wheaton, whom he had met at a screening of Arachnophobia in Burbank, California.

== Career ==
=== Acting and podcasting ===
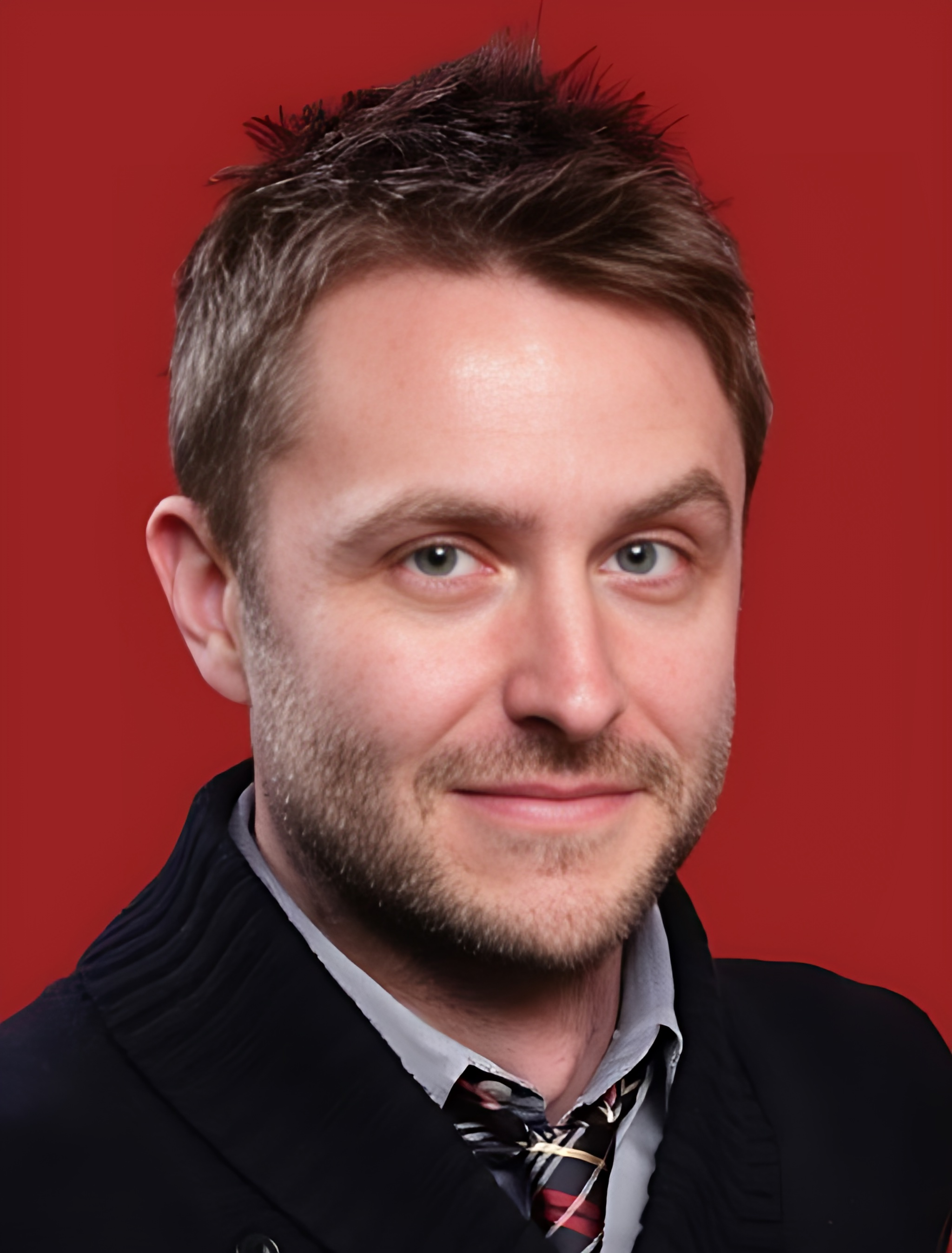
Hardwick in 2010

Hardwick was a DJ on Los Angeles radio station KROQ-FM during the mid-1990s. In the fall of 1998, he starred in the UPN comedy Guys Like Us; the show aired 12 episodes before it was cancelled in January 1999.

Hardwick appeared in Rob Zombie's horror films House of 1000 Corpses and Halloween II. He also made a small appearance in Terminator 3: Rise of the Machines. In 2010, he was featured in the film The Mother of Invention. He made guest appearances on such shows as CSI: Crime Scene Investigation, Married... with Children, Boy Meets World and Zoey 101, and was a guest commentator on VH1's I Love the '90s, which aired in 2005. He appeared as a television host on hip hop group Little Brother's 2005 album, The Minstrel Show.

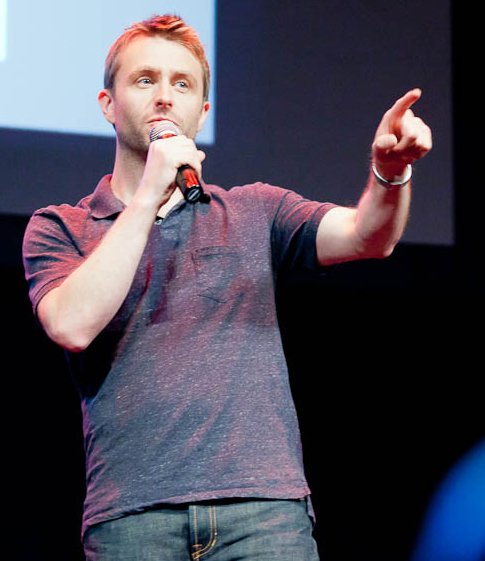
Hardwick in July 2011

Hardwick is a contributing writer for Wired (since 2007), wrote for Web Soup and Back at the Barnyard, and he made regular appearances on The Late Late Show with Craig Ferguson and Chelsea Lately. As part of what Hardwick calls his "nerd media empire", he ran Nerdist Theater, an entertainment space at Meltdown Comics in Los Angeles. He entered into an equity partnership with GeekChicDaily in June 2011 to form Nerdist Industries.

Hardwick published a self-help book, The Nerdist Way: How to Reach the Next Level (In Real Life), with Penguin Publishing, in late 2011. In February 2012, GeekChicDaily fully merged with Nerdist Industries and became Nerdist News, with Hardwick operating as Chief Creative Officer.

On July 10, 2012, Nerdist Industries was acquired by Legendary Entertainment. Hardwick was given the title of co-president of Legendary's digital business.

In February 2018, Hardwick announced that he would be rebranding The Nerdist Podcast to ID10T and that he would be leaving Nerdist since the contract with Legendary came to an end in 2017.

=== Voice-over work ===
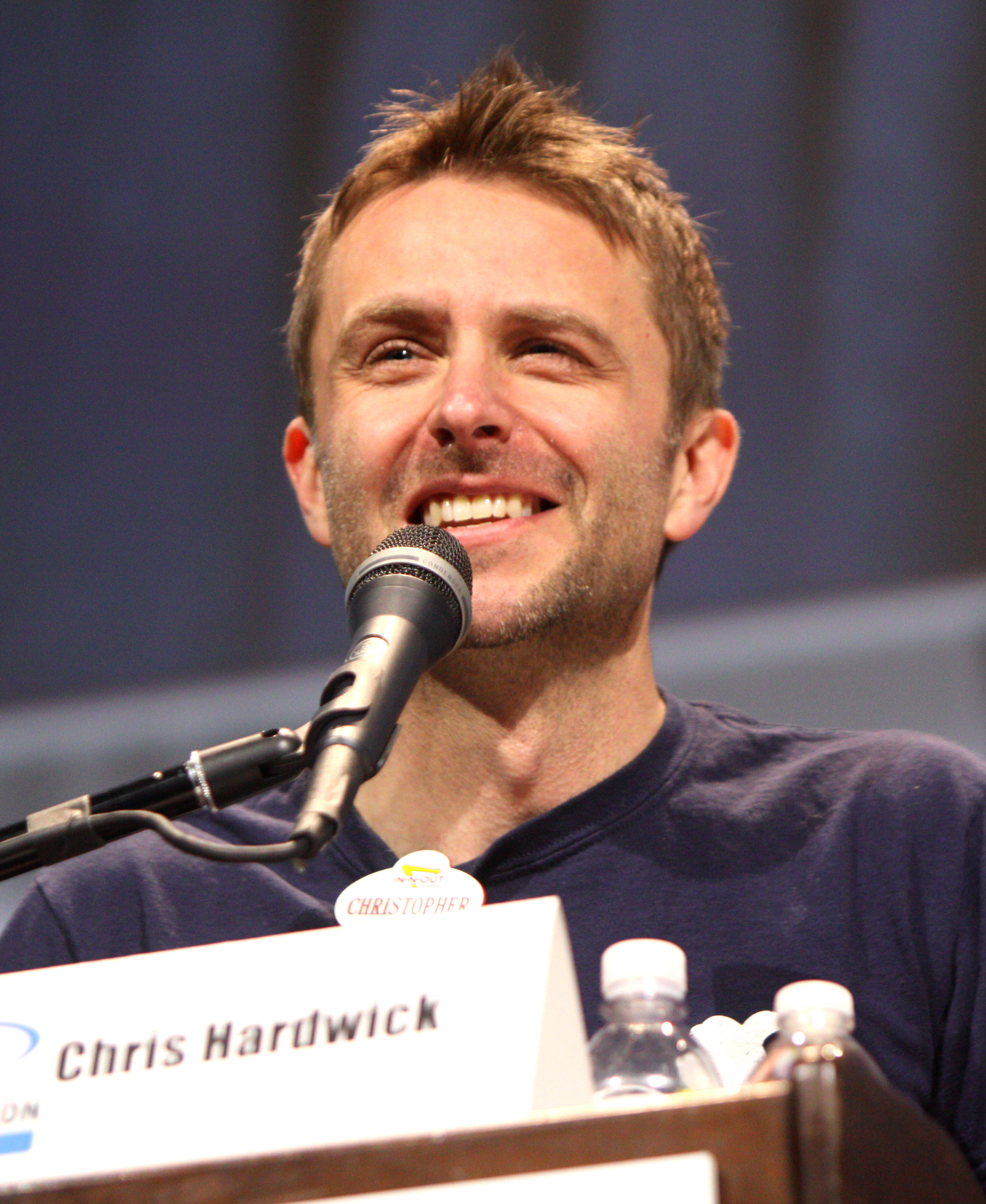
Hardwick speaking at the 2013 WonderCon

Hardwick voiced Alexander Hamilton in The Radio Adventures of Dr. Floyd and Otis the Cow in the Barnyard series (originally voiced by Kevin James in the film Barnyard).

He provided the voice for Green Arrow/Oliver Queen on The Batman and Lego Dimensions, Glowface in The X's, and Sokka in The Legend of Korra, as well as voice work for The Minstrel Show from the rap group Little Brother, and narration for the introduction video for the Flash animation game George Plimpton's Video Falconry. Between May 2013 and July 2016, he voiced "Craig the Snake" on Sanjay and Craig. He also voiced the character Vaughn in Telltale Games's Tales from the Borderlands, reprising his role in the Borderlands 2 DLC Commander Lilith and the Fight for Sanctuary and in Borderlands 3.

In 2017, Hardwick guest-voiced the villain Klaxxon for a special episode of Futurama released on the Nerdist podcast.

=== Hosting ===
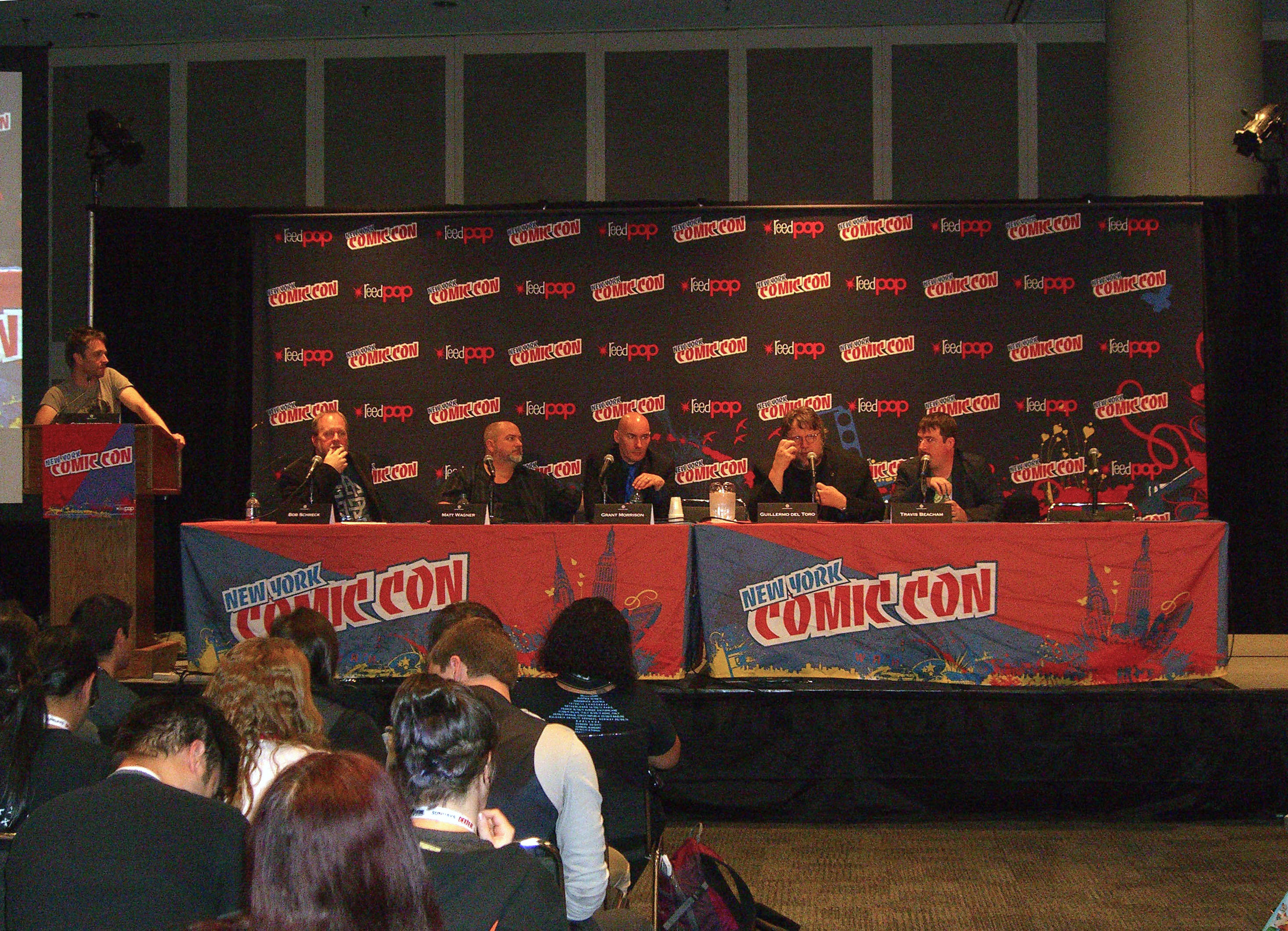
Hardwick (left) hosting the Legendary Comics panel at the 2012 New York Comic Con; beside him from left to right: Bob Schreck, Matt Wagner, Grant Morrison, Guillermo del Toro, and Travis Beacham

In 1993, Hardwick hosted the MTV game show Trashed, in which contestants would answer trivia questions or risk some of their belongings being destroyed. From 1995 to 1998, he co-hosted with Jenny McCarthy the MTV dating game show Singled Out, in which the main contestant selects from a pool of 50 people based on their attributes without seeing them. While working on Singled Out, he met fellow MTV personality Jacinda Barrett, to whom he became engaged but never married. Later, he hosted the syndicated dating show Shipmates.

From October through December 2007, Hardwick hosted the weekly series Wired Science on PBS, while writing for Wired magazine. On June 7, 2009, he became the host of G4's Web Soup, a spinoff of E!'s The Soup. Hardwick had previously guest-hosted The Soup's predecessor, Talk Soup.

Since February 2010, Hardwick has been producing the "Nerdist" podcast, which he hosts with Jonah Ray and Matt Mira. The podcast was named one of 2010's best by The A.V. Club and one of the 10 best comedy podcasts by Rolling Stone.

In May 2011, Hardwick signed a contract with BBC America to host a pilot of a panel talk show for the network based on the podcast. The pilot also included Hardwick doing intros and outros for BBC America's new Saturday-night Ministry of Laughs comedy block of Britcoms.

In 2011, Hardwick began hosting Talking Dead, a live half-hour (later expanded to one hour) aftershow to AMC's series The Walking Dead. Hardwick interviews celebrity fans of The Walking Dead as well as members of its cast and crew, interacts with the studio audience, re-airs clips of the episode, plays games with and polls the viewers via the Internet, and offers exclusive clips of the next episode. In August 2013, Hardwick began hosting Talking Bad, a live half-hour (later expanded to one hour on the final episode) talk show companion series to the final eight episodes of the AMC series Breaking Bad. In February 2016, Hardwick began hosting Talking Saul, a live one-hour talk show companion series to the season two premiere and finale of the AMC series Better Call Saul.

On December 24, 2011, BBC America aired The Nerdist: The Year in Review, a comedy special hosted by Hardwick in Los Angeles. In August 2012, he hosted a special episode of The Nerdist on BBC America to "debate" the effects of time and space with other friends and celebrity nerds. The episode was really an effort to promote the network's upcoming September 1 seventh-season premiere of the series Doctor Who.

On April 30, 2013, Comedy Central announced that Hardwick would host a half-hour comedic panel show called @midnight with Chris Hardwick. Thomas Lennon and Robert Ben Garant, formerly of Reno 911! , served as executive producers/showrunners. It premiered on October 21, 2013.

On November 7, 2014, he hosted the "Talent, Art, Movie and Costume" section of the BlizzCon gaming convention.

=== Stand-up comedy ===
Hardwick is also a stand-up comedian and performs with Mike Phirman in the music comedy duo Hard 'n Phirm, whose half-hour comedy special Comedy Central Presents: Hard 'n Phirm premiered in January 2008.

In 2004, Comedy Central used some of his material for an animated series called Shorties Watchin' Shorties. In 2007, both his solo standup and duo act were featured on the comedy compilation CD Comedy Death Ray. Hard 'n Phirm completed several songs for the 2009 Rob Zombie animated movie The Haunted World of El Superbeasto. Hardwick announced plans to do a live stand-up album from his 2009 tour. He has toured as a featured comedian for Joel McHale. In 2010, he appeared as a stand-up comic on John Oliver's New York Stand-Up Show twice. In the same year, Hardwick performed on the Comedy Central show The Benson Interruption.

On February 17, 2012, Hardwick filmed Mandroid, his first one-hour stand-up special for Comedy Central in New York City. Jonah Ray was his unaired opener. The special aired on Comedy Central on November 10, 2012, and was well received. Extended and uncensored DVD, CD, and digital versions were released January 22, 2013.

== Influences ==
Hardwick has said his influences include Steve Martin, George Carlin, Richard Pryor, Sam Kinison, Rodney Dangerfield, Bill Hicks, Emo Philips, and Bill Cosby.

== Personal life ==
Hardwick is a recovering alcoholic and says he has been sober since October 2003. A former co-worker said that Hardwick "replaced his alcoholism with workaholism".

=== Relationships ===
Hardwick was previously engaged to model and actress Jacinda Barrett and had a relationship with actress Andrea Savage. In 2004, he started a relationship with actress and comedian Janet Varney and they were together for seven years until their separation in 2011. Shortly after, he would go on to date Chloe Dykstra (from late 2011 to July 2014). He became engaged to model and actress Lydia Hearst on September 12, 2015, and the two married on August 20, 2016, in Pasadena, California. In August 2021, they announced that they were expecting their first child together. On January 29, 2022, they announced the arrival of their daughter.

Hardwick and his family currently live in Los Feliz, Los Angeles. He also owns a residence in Eagle Rock, Los Angeles.

=== Abuse allegation ===
Hardwick's ex-girlfriend Chloe Dykstra published an essay on Medium on June 14, 2018, in which she alleged that she had been subjected to emotional and sexual abuse by an unnamed ex-boyfriend, and claimed that she was subject to career blacklisting in retaliation for ending the relationship. The essay did not name the abuser, but the timing and several key details led readers to conclude it was Hardwick. In response, Nerdist removed all mentions of Hardwick from its website while AMC announced that further episodes of Talking with Chris Hardwick would be pulled. Hardwick also stepped away from moderating all AMC and BBC America panels at San Diego Comic-Con.

On July 25, 2018, AMC announced that a comprehensive investigation conducted alongside law firm Loeb & Loeb had failed to confirm Dykstra's allegations and that Hardwick would return as host of Talking Dead and Talking with Chris Hardwick. Their statement read, "We take these matters very seriously and given the information available to us after a very careful review, including interviews with numerous individuals, we believe returning Chris to work is the appropriate step." Dykstra, who refused to cooperate in the investigation, stated two days later on Twitter, "I chose not to participate in the investigation of the person I spoke of. I do not believe in an eye for an eye." She also stated that she "originally wrote [her] essay so [she] could move on with [her] life, and now [she intends] to do so". On July 31, 2018, NBC announced that Hardwick would return as host of The Wall following its own investigation. On August 10, 2018, his name was returned to Nerdist's website after their own investigation.

== Discography ==
- Horses and Grasses (2005)
- Mandroid (2012)
- Funcomfortable (2016)

== Filmography ==
=== Film ===
| Year | Title | Role | Notes |
|---|---|---|---|
| 1996 | Beach House | Ross | |
| 1997 | Courting Courtney | Tim | |
| 1998 | Win a Date | Evrett | Short film |
| 1998 | Beach House | Ross | |
| 1998 | Art House | Weston Craig | |
| 2000 | Jack & Diane | Jack | Short film |
| 2002 | Jane White Is Sick & Twisted | Burger | |
| 2003 | House of 1000 Corpses | Jerry Goldsmith | |
| 2003 | Terminator 3: Rise of the Machines | 2nd Engineer | |
| 2004 | Spectres | Sam Phillips | |
| 2004 | Johnson Family Vacation | Arson investigator | |
| 2005 | The Life Coach | Milos | |
| 2009 | The Mother of Invention | Drake Wooderson | |
| 2009 | Halloween II | David Newman | |
| 2010 | Lego: The Adventures of Clutch Powers | Bones | Voice, direct-to-video |
| 2011 | Extremely Loud & Incredibly Close | Estate Sale Organizer | |
| 2013 | Booker, Catch! | Booker | Short film |
| 2015 | Me Him Her | Culk Didip | |
| 2017 | The Lego Batman Movie | Reporter #3 | Voice, cameo |
| 2017 | The Lego Ninjago Movie | Radio DJ | Voice, cameo |
| 2018 | My Brother Peter! | Himself | Short film |

=== Television ===
| Year | Title | Role | Notes |
|---|---|---|---|
| 1991 | Thirtysomething | Young Man | Episode: "Closing the Circle" |
| 1994 | Trashed | Himself (host) | 50 episodes |
| 1995–1998 | Singled Out | Himself (host) | 130 episodes |
| 1996 | Boy Meets World | Himself | Episode: "Singled Out" |
| 1996 | Married... with Children | Dan Inwood | 2 episodes |
| 1996 | MADtv | Himself | 1 episode |
| 1998–1999 | Guys Like Us | Sean Barker | 13 episodes |
| 2001 | The Zeta Project | Ro's Brother | Voice, episode: "Ro's Reunion" |
| 2001–2003 | Shipmates | Himself (host) | |
| 2005 | Zoey 101 | Garth Berman | Episode: "Spring Fling" |
| 2005–2007 | The X's | Glowface, additional voices | Voice, 20 episodes |
| 2006 | CSI: Crime Scene Investigation | Mikey Shoemaker | Episode: "Rashomama" |
| 2007 | Wired Science | Himself (host) | 11 episodes |
| 2007–2008 | The Batman | Oliver Queen / Green Arrow | Voice, 3 episodes |
| 2007–2011 | Back at the Barnyard | Otis the Cow, additional voices | Voice, 52 episodes also writer for the episode "Little Otis" |
| 2008 | Chop Socky Chooks | Chuckie Chan | Voice, English dub |
| 2008 | Comedy Central Presents | Himself | Episode: "Hard 'n Phirm" |
| 2008 | The Radio Adventures of Dr. Floyd | Alexander Hamilton | Episode: "407" |
| 2008–2013 | Attack of the Show! | Himself | 73 episodes |
| 2009–2011 | Web Soup | Himself (host) | 53 episodes |
| 2010 | John Oliver's New York Stand-Up Show | Himself | 2 episodes |
| 2010 | The Benson Interruption | Himself | 1 episode |
| 2010–2011 | McBusters | Morgan Spurlock | Voice, 2 episodes |
| 2011–2012 | Scooby-Doo! Mystery Incorporated | Additional voices | 2 episodes |
| 2011–2022 | Talking Dead | Himself (host) | Also producer |
| 2012 | The Legend of Korra | Sokka | Voice, episode: "Out of the Past" |
| 2012 | Chris Hardwick: Mandroid | Himself | Stand-up special |
| 2012–2013 | The Nerdist | Himself (host) | 18 episodes |
| 2013 | Video Game High School | Anchorman | Episode: "Loopholes" |
| 2013 | Talking Bad | Himself (host) | 8 episodes |
| 2013–2016 | Sanjay and Craig | Craig, additional voices | Voice, 60 episodes |
| 2013–2017 | @midnight with Chris Hardwick | Himself (host) | 600 episodes; also creator, writer and executive producer |
| 2013–2015 | Comedy Bang! Bang! | Himself | 3 episodes |
| 2014 | Garfunkel & Oates | Himself | Episode: "Rule 34" |
| 2014 | Maron | Himself | Episode: "Marc on Talking Dead" |
| 2015 | Family Guy | Johnny Lawrence | Voice, episode: "Once Bitten" |
| 2016–2017 | Talking Saul | Himself (host) | 4 episodes; also executive producer |
| 2016–2017 | Talking Preacher | Himself (host) | 3 episodes; also executive producer |
| 2016 | Turbo Fast | Turblows47 | Voice, episode: "Don't Feed the Troll" |
| 2016 | Chris Hardwick: Funcomfortable | Himself | Stand-up special |
| 2016 | Critical Role | Gern Blanston | Episode: "Cindergrove Revisited" |
| 2016 | Force Grey: Giant Hunters | Wil Wee-Tawn | Web series |
| 2016 | The Jim Gaffigan Show | Himself | Episode: "No Good Deed: Part 2" |
| 2016–present | The Wall | Himself (host) | Also executive producer |
| 2017 | Bunsen Is a Beast | Officer Steve Stevenson | Voice, episode: "Fright at the Museum" |
| 2017 | Robot Chicken | Himself | Voice, episode: "The Robot Chicken Walking Dead Special: Look Who's Walking" |
| 2017 | Talking with Chris Hardwick | Himself (host) | 15 episodes |
| 2017–2018 | America's Got Talent | Himself | 2 episodes |
| 2019 | Whose Line Is It Anyway? | Himself | Season premiere |
| 2023 | Krapopolis | Himself | Voice, episode: "Big Man on Hippocampus" |
| 2023 | Barmageddon | Himself | Episode: "Rob Riggle vs. Chris Hardwick" |

=== Video games ===
| Year | Title | Role | Notes |
|---|---|---|---|
| 2014 | Tales from the Borderlands | Vaughn | |
| 2016 | Lego Dimensions | Green Arrow | |
| 2019 | Borderlands 2 | Vaughn | Commander Lilith and the Fight for Sanctuary DLC |
| 2019 | Borderlands 3 | Vaughn | |

=== Music videos ===
- Ben Folds Five's "Do It Anyway": Executive producer and actor

== Awards and nominations ==
| Year | Title | Nominated work | Result |
|---|---|---|---|
| 2024 | The Initials Game 548, KFAN Power Trip Morning Show | | Won |
| 2014 | Spike Guys' Choice Award for Smartacus | | Won |
| 2014 | Primetime Emmy Award for Outstanding Interactive Program | @midnight with Chris Hardwick | Nominated |
| 2015 | Primetime Emmy Award for Outstanding Interactive Program | @midnight with Chris Hardwick | Nominated |
| 2015 | Primetime Emmy Award for Outstanding Creative Achievement In Interactive Media – Social TV Experience | @midnight with Chris Hardwick | Won |
| 2016 | Primetime Emmy Award for Outstanding Creative Achievement In Interactive Media – Social TV Experience | @midnight with Chris Hardwick | Won |
| 2016 | Primetime Emmy Award for Outstanding Interactive Program | Talking Dead | Nominated |
