= Talking with Chris Hardwick =

- Genre: Talk show
- Directed by: Russell Norman
- Presented by: Chris Hardwick
- Country of origin: United States
- Original language: English
- No. of seasons: 1
- No. of episodes: 15

Production
- Executive producers: Michael Davies; Jen Patton; Brandon Monk; Chris Hardwick; Alex Manning
- Producer: Sarah Schultz
- Production locations: CBS Television City, Hollywood, California
- Editors: Rod Chew; Scott Riddle
- Running time: 42 minutes
- Production companies: Fish Ladder; Embassy Row; AMC Studios

Original release
- Network: AMC
- Release: April 9 – September 3, 2017

Talking with Chris Hardwick is a weekly talk show that features host Chris Hardwick interviewing a celebrity guest from the world of pop culture that premiered on April 9, 2017 on AMC.

== Format ==
The series follows in the vein of Talking Dead, Talking Bad, Talking Saul and Talking Preacher. But unlike those shows, each one-hour episode is pre-recorded. Segments featured on the show include social media presidency, live audience interactivity, Hardwick's discussion about pop culture and trivia on the guest featured in each episode. An uncensored version of all the episodes were released as audio formats on Hardwick's own The Nerdist Podcast following its broadcast airing.

== Production ==
The series premiered on AMC on April 9, 2017, filling a hiatus for Talking Dead between the season finale of The Walking Dead and the third-season premiere of Fear the Walking Dead. Hardwick described the show as a means to branch the format into wider pop culture, stating that it had "the skin of Talking Dead, the soul of the Nerdist podcast and the guts of a Comic-Con panel."

The eight-episode second season was set to premiere on June 17, 2018. The initial lineup of guests set to appear were Chris Pratt, Bill Hader, Karen Gillan, Donald Glover, Ethan Hawke, Amy Adams, and Seth Rogen and Evan Goldberg with Glover appearing in the season premiere. However, AMC pulled the show a day prior to the airing in light of allegations made against Hardwick by his ex-girlfriend Chloe Dykstra. On July 25, after an investigation by AMC and with the assistance of a law firm, the company decided to reinstate Hardwick as the show’s host.

== Episodes ==
No.	Title	Original release date	US viewers (millions)
1	Elijah Wood	April 9, 2017	0.531
2	Thomas Middleditch, Martin Starr and Zach Woods	April 16, 2017	0.286
3	Michelle Monaghan	April 23, 2017	0.306
4	James Corden	April 30, 2017	0.351
5	Charlie Hunnam	May 7, 2017	0.293
6	Jordan Peele	May 14, 2017	0.406
7	Taylor Schilling, Danielle Brooks, Taryn Manning and Uzo Aduba	May 21, 2017	0.222
8	Connie Britton	July 16, 2017	0.262
9	Damon Lindelof	July 23, 2017	0.172
10	Jane Lynch	July 30, 2017	0.195
11	Bryan Cranston	August 6, 2017	0.303
12	Jaimie Alexander	August 13, 2017	0.190
13	Neil deGrasse Tyson	August 20, 2017	0.297
14	Dominic Monaghan	August 27, 2017	0.315
15	Tatiana Maslany	September 3, 2017	0.350

== See also ==
- Talking Dead – a similar talk show hosted by Hardwick which discusses episodes of The Walking Dead and Fear the Walking Dead.
- Talking Bad – a similar talk show hosted by Hardwick which discusses the final eight episodes of Breaking Bad's fifth and final season.
- Talking Saul – a similar talk show hosted by Hardwick which discusses select episodes of Better Call Saul.
- Talking Preacher – a similar talk show hosted by Hardwick which discusses select episodes of Preacher.
