= DVD TV =

- Created by: Joseph Lee
- Country of origin: United States
- No. of episodes: 72

Production
- Running time: 105 minutes

Original release
- Network: AMC
- Release: June 2, 2002 – August 3, 2008

DVD_TV was a film trivia show that presents the story behind the making of a movie as streaming text in the letterbox area below the picture. It is broadcast in the United States and Canada on the cable network AMC, and is created by and produced at Riverstreet Productions. It premiered on June 2, 2002 with an enhanced presentation of Breakfast At Tiffany's. DVD_TV aired monthly, usually on Sunday nights, and continued for six seasons before its final airing, an augmented version of Apollo 13, on August 3, 2008.

== Format ==
Unlike many trivia shows and movies with a "pop-up" format, DVD_TV is configured with respect for both action and picture. DVD_TV movies are always presented in their original theatrical aspect ratio, so the 4:3 televised version allows room for text to run in the black letterbox area, as opposed to interfering with picture. Trivia is organized to appear during relevant scenes in the movie, and is written and timed to play in a measured, conversational, and sometimes irreverent manner. This screening format may have ultimately proved a deciding factor in DVD_TV's 2008 cancellation, as by then 16:9 widescreen TV's had started to become commonplace due to the advent of HDTV. Because these TV's could (and did) display the full video image, the letterbox bars-and therefore the trivia text-would be completely lost, defeating the entire purpose for watching the show.

The exhaustive research done for DVD_TV allows for an in-depth look at each film's production story, historical background, and place in movie history, not to mention a wealth of personal anecdotes from the cast and crew and little-known trivia about things like locations, wardrobe and props. In fact, the research is so extensive that additional behind-the-scenes stories that couldn't fit into the enhanced movie are usually posted on the AMC site to supplement the show.

== Other versions ==
When AMC first began airing DVD_TV, the enhanced movie was part of an evening programming block called DVD_TV which concentrated on a single movie, with the enhanced movie portion of the block being referred to as Much More Movie. Later, the "Much More Movie" title was dropped and the enhanced movie was retitled "DVD_TV: Enhanced Version."
