= Rabid Dog =

- Breaking Bad episode
- Episode no.: Season 5 Episode 12
- Directed by: Sam Catlin
- Written by: Sam Catlin
- Cinematography by: Michael Slovis
- Editing by: Skip Macdonald
- Original air date: September 1, 2013
- Running time: 47 minutes

Guest appearances
- Steven Michael Quezada as Steven Gomez; Bill Burr as Patrick Kuby; Lavell Crawford as Huell Babineaux; Bruce McKenzie as Dave

Episode chronology
← Previous "Confessions"	Next → "To'hajiilee"
- Breaking Bad season 5

"Rabid Dog" is the twelfth episode of the fifth season of the American television drama series Breaking Bad, and the 58th overall episode of the series. Written and directed by Sam Catlin, it aired on AMC in the United States and Canada on September 1, 2013.

== Plot ==
Walter White cautiously examines his house in search of Jesse Pinkman, who broke in and doused it in gasoline. (Note: As depicted in the previous episode "Confessions".) Jesse is absent, but Walt finds white powder in Saul Goodman's crashed car, suspecting that Jesse is high on meth. After a cleaning crew cannot fully remove the gasoline scent, Walt douses his clothing and the seats of his car with it, concocting a fabrication about a pump malfunction at the gas station. Skyler and Walter White Jr. are doubtful for different reasons. Walter Jr. thinks he fainted again due to the cancer, whereas Skyler thinks something more sinister. The family moves into a hotel until the carpet and flooring can be replaced.

Walt secretly meets with Saul and Patrick Kuby in the hotel's parking lot, asking for an update on Jesse's whereabouts. Saul hints at the possibility of killing Jesse, but Walt rejects the idea. Back in their hotel room, Skyler confronts Walt over his lies, having just seen him with Saul. Walt confesses that Jesse is upset and tried to burn down their house, but he is not concerned since Jesse decided against it. A shocked Skyler presses Walt to kill Jesse, who she views as a threat to their safety.

A flashback reveals Hank Schrader trailed Jesse to Walt's residence after Jesse assaulted Saul, talking Jesse out of torching the house. Hank convinces Jesse to work together to bring Walt down, leaving moments before Walt arrived. Marie talks to her therapist about her issues with Walt but will not disclose the full extent of his criminality. Hank keeps Jesse at their house because he believes Jesse is more protected there; Marie agrees once Hank tells her that Jesse's involvement is bad for Walt. Hank and Steve Gomez tape Jesse as he recounts his history with Walt. Since there is no physical evidence, and Walt has left the meth business, Hank needs something incriminating enough to take to the authorities.

Walt leaves a voicemail for Jesse, asking to meet in a plaza to reconcile over Brock Cantillo's poisoning. Hank coerces the reluctant Jesse to comply and retrieve appropriate evidence against Walt, despite Jesse's fear for his own safety. Hank reassures Jesse by recounting Walt's previous attempts to protect him at his own expense and states that since the meeting is in a public place, he will be safe. However, privately with Gomez, Hank is indifferent to Jesse risking his death; if Jesse is killed on camera, it can still be used as evidence.

Wired for sound, Jesse goes to meet with Walt but backs down after mistaking a nearby pedestrian for a hitman. Angered, Jesse goes to a pay phone to call Walt and threatens him, telling him that he will "get him where he really lives." Hank berates Jesse for blowing the plan, but Jesse calmly informs him that he has a better strategy in mind. Meanwhile, Walt calls Todd, requesting another hit from his uncle, Jack.

== Reception ==
=== Viewership ===
The episode was viewed by 4.41 million people on its original broadcast, which was a decrease from the 4.85 million of the previous episode.

=== Reviews ===
In 2019 The Ringer ranked "Rabid Dog" 38th out of the 62 total Breaking Bad episodes.
