= Confessions (Breaking Bad) =

- Breaking Bad episode
- Episode no.: Season 5 Episode 11
- Directed by: Michael Slovis
- Written by: Gennifer Hutchison
- Cinematography by: Arthur Albert
- Editing by: Kelley Dixon
- Original air date: August 25, 2013
- Running time: 47 minutes

Guest appearances
- Steven Michael Quezada as Steven Gomez; Lavell Crawford as Huell Babineaux; Michael Bowen as Jack Welker; Kevin Rankin as Kenny; Gonzalo Menendez as Detective Kalanchoe; Guy Wilson as Trent; Tina Parker as Francesca Liddy; Jason Douglas as Detective Munn

Episode chronology
← Previous "Buried"	Next → "Rabid Dog"
- Breaking Bad season 5

"Confessions" is the eleventh episode of the fifth season of the American television drama series Breaking Bad, and the 57th overall episode of the series. Written by Gennifer Hutchison and directed by Michael Slovis, it aired on AMC in the United States and Canada on August 25, 2013.

== Plot ==
At a diner, Todd recalls to his uncle Jack and Jack's accomplice Kenny how he helped steal methylamine from the train, (Note: As depicted in "Dead Freight".) neglecting to mention the boy he murdered. Agreeing to let Todd cook meth on his own, Jack and Kenny drive back into New Mexico. Meanwhile, Hank tells Jesse that he knows Walt is Heisenberg. Jesse refuses to cooperate, and is released after Saul Goodman shows up. Later, Walter Jr. informs his father that Marie has asked him to help repair her computer and invited him to stay for dinner. Walt manipulates his son into staying home by confessing that his cancer has returned.

Walt and Skyler meet the Schraders at a restaurant in an attempt to negotiate with them, but the meeting goes nowhere. As the Whites leave, Walt gives his in-laws a DVD of his "confession". Playing it at home, the Schraders discover they are being blackmailed. Walt's "confession" states that Hank masterminded the Heisenberg empire and forced Walt to cook meth for him. A stunned Hank then learns that Marie paid for his physical therapy using Walt's drug money, which Skyler had claimed were gambling winnings. This lends credence to Walt's story and torpedoes Hank's credibility.

Walt meets Jesse in the desert and tells him that Saul can contact someone who specializes in creating new identities. (Note: Identified offscreen as Ed Galbraith.) He advises Jesse to start over and have a better life. Jesse reacts angrily, and asks Walt to stop manipulating him, knowing Walt has killed Mike Ehrmantraut. In response, Walt simply embraces Jesse, who cries in his arms.

Jesse calls Saul and prepares to leave Albuquerque. Saul admonishes him for bringing marijuana for the journey and has Huell Babineaux pickpocket it when he refuses to hand it over. While Jesse is waiting for the van that will relocate him, he notices the marijuana is gone and realizes that Huell must have taken it. This puts him in mind of the ricin cigarette that he also suspected Huell of taking, (Note: As depicted in "End Times".) a suspicion that he now realizes was correct. The corollary of this is that it was Walt and not Gus who orchestrated Brock Cantillo's poisoning. An enraged Jesse returns to Saul's office and extracts a confession from him. He then drives to the White residence in Saul's car, kicks in the front door, and begins pouring gasoline everywhere. Meanwhile, Saul calls Walt, who rushes to the car wash to retrieve a hidden revolver.

== Production ==
Millard Drexler, former chairman and CEO of J.Crew Group, had a cameo appearance in this episode as a customer at the Whites' car wash to whom Skyler gives incorrect change. He stated that his scene, in which he says eight or nine words, took nine takes to film.

The filming of the episode took place starting January 10, 2013.

== Reception ==
=== Viewership ===
The episode was viewed by 4.85 million people on its original broadcast, which was an increase from the 4.77 million of the previous episode.

=== Reviews ===
TVLine named Aaron Paul the "Performer of the Week" for his performance in this episode.

In 2019 The Ringer ranked "Confessions" as the 24th best out of the 62 total Breaking Bad episodes.

=== Accolades ===
Gennifer Hutchison won the Writers Guild of America Award for Television: Episodic Drama for this episode.

Aaron Paul won the Primetime Emmy Award for Outstanding Supporting Actor in a Drama Series in 2014 for his performance in this episode.
