= To'hajiilee =

- Breaking Bad episode
- Episode no.: Season 5 Episode 13
- Directed by: Michelle MacLaren
- Written by: George Mastras
- Cinematography by: Michael Slovis
- Editing by: Kelley Dixon
- Original air date: September 8, 2013
- Running time: 46 minutes

Guest appearances
- Steven Michael Quezada as Steven Gomez; Emily Rios as Andrea Cantillo; Lavell Crawford as Huell Babineaux; Michael Bowen as Jack Welker; Kevin Rankin as Kenny; Ian Posada as Brock Cantillo

Episode chronology
← Previous "Rabid Dog"	Next → "Ozymandias"
- Breaking Bad season 5

"To'hajiilee" is the thirteenth episode of the fifth season of the American television drama series Breaking Bad, and the 59th episode overall. Written by George Mastras and directed by Michelle MacLaren, it aired on AMC in the United States and Canada on September 8, 2013.

== Plot ==
Todd Alquist receives a call from Walter White, asking his uncle, Jack Welker, to put a hit on Jesse Pinkman. Jack tells Walt that he will only kill Jesse if Walt teaches Todd to cook his signature blue meth, which Walt reluctantly agrees to do. Meanwhile, Jesse tells Hank Schrader and Steven Gomez about his plan to capture Walt through his money. At Jesse's lead, Hank visits Huell Babineaux at a Drug Enforcement Administration (DEA) safe house and tricks him into cooperating by having him believe that Walt plans to kill him to cover up Walt's poisoning of Brock Cantillo. (Note: As depicted in "End Times".) Hank shows Huell a staged photo of Jesse shot in the head as proof. Huell confesses that he and Kuby stored Walt's money in barrels, and Walt collected the barrels with a rental van and shovel, but he does not know where the money is hidden. Hank advises Huell not to answer any calls or leave the house.

Jesse sends Walt a photo of a barrel filled with money, claiming that he has found Walt's fortune, and threatens to burn it all if the call ends. Walt frantically rushes to the location. During the heated conversation, Walt confesses to poisoning Brock but says that he ensured his survival and that all the murders he has committed were also committed to protect Jesse. Walt arrives at the desert location where his money is buried but finds no one there. He then sees another car approaching carrying Jesse and hides, believing Jesse is going to kill him. He calls Jack and gives the brotherhood the coordinates of his buried fortune, but then calls it off when he sees that Hank and Gomez are with Jesse.

Cornered, Walt surrenders to Hank, who handcuffs him and reads him his Miranda rights. Jesse feigned that the rental van had GPS tracking, the photo was staged from Hank's backyard, and they have tracked Walt through his phone. Jesse walks over to Walt and spits on him, which causes Walt to attack Jesse until Gomez and Hank break them up. Walt is put in the backseat of Gomez's SUV while Jesse is escorted to Walt's car. Hank then calls Marie Schrader to inform her that he has caught Walt. However, Jack and his brotherhood approach from the desert, having ignored Walt's cancellation, and confront Hank and Gomez. A panicked Walt attempts to defuse the situation to no avail. The gang opens fire, while Jesse and Walt take cover in the cars to avoid the gunfight.

== Production ==
Filming of the episode began on February 4, 2013. The scene where Walt drives out to the reservation was entirely filmed in green screen, as they could not afford to shut down all the streets needed to film it in-camera. The episode's title, "To'hajiilee", refers to the Tohajiilee Indian Reservation where the arrest and gunfight at the end of the episode occur. This location was also the setting of Walt and Jesse's first cook in "Pilot".

== Reception ==
=== Viewership ===
The episode was viewed by 5.11 million people on its original broadcast, which was an increase from the 4.41 million of the previous episode.

=== Reviews ===
Tim Surette at TV.com calls "To'hajiilee" '"a direct hit and one of the best (episodes) of the season, maybe even the series". Seth Amitin from IGN gave this episode a score of 10 out of 10, praising the direction and the twists and turns the episode took.

In 2019, The Ringer ranked "To'hajiilee" as the 11th best out of the 62 total Breaking Bad episodes.

For her work on this episode, Kelley Dixon was nominated for Outstanding Single-Camera Picture Editing for a Drama Series, losing to Skip Macdonald for "Felina".
