= Aftershow =

TV talk show about another TV show

An aftershow, after-show, or companion show is a genre of television program dedicated to discussing another television program.

An aftershow is typically broadcast immediately after a new episode of its corresponding series or some time afterward, targeting fans of the parent series with additional discussion and content such as analysis and behind-the-scenes featurettes. Aftershows can be structured as a news magazine or documentary-like program, or as a talk show that features the series' cast, staff, and/or celebrity fans as guests, and incorporates interactions with a studio audience or viewers via the Internet.

The rewatch podcast is a related, less time-sensitive concept, often recorded after the series has ended and entered reruns or video on demand.

== Format ==
An aftershow's typical format, pioneered by Howard Stern's The Wrap-Up Show on Sirius Satellite Radio in 2006, is two or more people discussing a just-aired episode. This is sometimes accompanied by bonus material from the series, or special guests such as actors or creative staff. Television networks have seen aftershows as a means to provide more content for avid fans of popular series, as a venue for interacting with fans directly, and to help provide additional context and analysis to the series' narrative and themes. The Walking Dead showrunner Glen Mazzara noted that aftershows were usually cheaper to produce than other types of lead-out programs, and had a "built-in audience" of fans that could be retained.

Some aftershows—particularly those involving reality shows—are structured as a news magazine -like program with feature segments, including behind the scenes footage, and interviews with eliminated contestants and series alumni. Some of these examples, including American Idol Extra, Britain's Got More Talent, Strictly Come Dancing: It Takes Two, and The Xtra Factor, primarily aired on a sister channel to the network that carried the main program (such as BBC Two, ITV2, and the Fox Reality Channel).

For its former coverage of the Indian Premier League in cricket, Sony Pictures Networks aired Extraaa Innings T20—which combined the aftershow concept with elements of a traditional sports post-game show by featuring both match analysis and entertainment segments such as celebrity interviews. The Channel 4 chat show The Last Leg with Adam Hills was originally conceived as an aftershow for its coverage of the 2012 Summer Paralympics, but proved successful enough to be picked up as a regular, weekly series outside of the Paralympics. James Corden has been involved in two aftershows regarding the FIFA World Cup, hosting James Corden's World Cup Live for ITV in 2010, and After Hours with James Corden for Fox in 2026.

== History ==
The British version of Big Brother premiered Big Brother's Little Brother in 2001 as part of its second series, which was a magazine-like show that featured recaps and interviews relating to the series. It was later accompanied by an interactive chat show, Big Brother's Big Mouth. During the Channel 5 era of the series, a similar series known as Big Brother's Bit on the Side served as the companion show.

MTV Canada's The After Show (2006) was cited by the Toronto Star as an early predecessor to the aftershow format adopted in North America. The show was produced to accompany its airings of MTV's Laguna Beach due to CRTC licensing requirements regarding the provision of Canadian productions and talk show programming (the latter stemming from the service's early history in a previous format known as TalkTV). The show gained a steady following: MTV Canada began producing the show in front of a studio audience for the Laguna Beach finale, resulting in "thousands" of fans lining up outside of the channel's Toronto studio for a chance to attend. The format was extended to its sister series The Hills, and was later picked up to air on the American MTV channel as well.

In 2005, BBC Three premiered Doctor Who Confidential, a companion series for the revival of Doctor Who that featured behind-the-scenes featurettes and other content. The series aired new episodes following the first-run airings of Doctor Who on BBC One. The series was cancelled in 2012 amid budgetary concerns, and replaced with video features on the BBC's website.

In 2009, Bravo premiered Watch What Happens Live with Andy Cohen, a late-night talk show which primarily discusses Bravo's reality programming, and features viewer contributions such as questions. It also discusses other facets and headlines in popular culture, and expanded from a weekly to weeknight scheduling in 2011.

In 2013, AMC premiered Talking Dead with Chris Hardwick as a companion for its series The Walking Dead; executive producer Brandon Monk cited Watch What Happens Live as the program's main influence. Following the example of Talking Dead, American entertainment channels began to add aftershows to their most popular scripted series in the 2010s. Embassy Row—the Sony Pictures Television-owned studio who produces Talking Dead, would be commissioned by other networks for their some of their own aftershows, such as Shark After Dark Live (which it produced for Discovery's Shark Week event). In 2012, Maria Menounos launched AfterBuzz TV, a network of post-show podcasts devoted to various television series.

== Notable aftershows ==
Title	Program(s) discussed	First aired	Last aired	Channel	Notes	Ref.
A Eliminação	Big Brother Brasil		present	Multishow		
The After Show	Various reality series		2010	MTV		
Doctor Who Confidential	Doctor Who	2005	2011	BBC Three		
Watch What Happens Live with Andy Cohen	Various reality series	2009	present	Bravo		
RuPaul's Drag Race: Untucked	RuPaul's Drag Race	2010	present	Logo TV (2010–2014)	Began with season 2	
RuPaul's Drag Race: Untucked	RuPaul's Drag Race	2010	present	YouTube (2015–2017)	Began with season 2	
RuPaul's Drag Race: Untucked	RuPaul's Drag Race	2010	present	VH1 (2018–present)	Began with season 2	
Thronecast	Game of Thrones	2011	2019	Sky Atlantic		
Talking Dead	The Walking Dead; Fear the Walking Dead	2011	present	AMC	Began with season 2 for both series	
Agents of S.H.I.E.L.D.: Declassified	Agents of S.H.I.E.L.D.	2013	2014	ABC.com	Only the first season.	
Talking Bad	Breaking Bad	2013	2013	AMC	Only for final eight episodes of the series	
Wolf Watch	Teen Wolf	2013	2015	MTV	Only from the second half of Season 3 to some episodes in the first half of Season 5.	
Anarchy Afterword	Sons of Anarchy	2013	2014	FX	Online web series; for seasons 6 and 7	
Rebels Recon	Star Wars Rebels	2014	2018	Disney XD	Online web series for entire show	
After the Black	Orphan Black	2015	2017	Space / BBC America	Began with season 3	
Talking Saul	Better Call Saul	2016	2022	AMC	Only for season 2-3 (for premiere and finale episodes only) and season 6 (two episodes)	
After the Thrones	Game of Thrones	2016	2016	HBO	For season 6 only	
Talking Preacher	Preacher	2016	2017	AMC	Only for premiere and finale episodes	
Hacking Robot	Mr. Robot	2016	2019	USA Network	Began with season 2; only for premiere and finale episodes	
Mr. Robot Digital After Show	Mr. Robot	2016	2019	The Verge / USA Network	Began with season 2; online only	
Raw Talk	Monday Night Raw	2016	present	WWE Network		
WWE Talking Smack	SmackDown	2016	Present	WWE Network	Only for one week, aired on FS1 on October 23, 2020.	
After Trek	Star Trek: Discovery	2017	2018	CBS All Access	Only for season 1	
The Ready Room	Star Trek: Discovery	2019	Present	CBS All Access / Paramount+	Began with season 2	
The Ready Room	Star Trek: Lower Decks	2019	Present	CBS All Access / Paramount+	Began with season 1; only for premiere and finale episodes with occasional "midseason specials"	
The Ready Room	Star Trek: Picard	2019	Present	CBS All Access / Paramount+	Began with season 1; bonus episode aired during post season 1 hiatus	
The Ready Room	Star Trek: Prodigy	2019	Present	CBS All Access / Paramount+	Began with season 1; only for premiere and finale episodes	
The Ready Room	Star Trek: Strange New Worlds	2019	Present	CBS All Access / Paramount+	Began with season 1; bonus episode aired prior to season 2	
Beyond the Reasons	13 Reasons Why	2017	2019	Netflix	One episode per season.	
Beyond Stranger Things	Stranger Things	2017	2017	Netflix	Only for season 2	
Crisis Aftermath	Arrowverse	2019	2019	The CW		
Look Hooo's Talking	The Owl House	2020	2020	Disney Channel	Online web series for first ten episodes	
Revelations: The Masters of the Universe Revelation Aftershow	Masters of the Universe: Revelation	2021	Present	Netflix		
One Killer Question	Only Murders in the Building	2023	Present	Hulu		
Australian Survivor: Talking Tribal	Australian Survivor	2020	2024	Network 10	5 seasons, 47 episodes	

== Parodies ==
The aftershow format has been spoofed by other series. British comedian Peter Kay's 2008 reality television satire Britain's Got the Pop Factor... and Possibly a New Celebrity Jesus Christ Soapstar Superstar Strictly on Ice featured a "companion show"—Peter Kay's Britain's Got an Extra Pop Factor and Then Some 2 + 1—an epilogue which followed the aftermath of Geraldine McQueen's victory on Britain's Got the Pop Factor.

In 2015, when CBS aired reruns of its primetime dramas to fill the former timeslot of Late Show with David Letterman until the premiere of The Late Show with Stephen Colbert, The Late Late Show with James Corden satirized the format with cold open sketches depicting aftershows such as Talking Mentalist and Talking Hawaii Five-0. One sketch also featured a metaparody, Talking Talking Mentalist—an aftershow for Talking Mentalist hosted by Corden's bandleader Reggie Watts.

The 2019 Fox comedy What Just Happened??! with Fred Savage was framed as an aftershow for the in-universe drama series The Flare. Its season (and ultimately, series) finale featured Savage reconciling with the cancellation of The Flare, and having to use his show to promote the new teen drama Havenbrook.
