= Talking Saul =

- Genre: Talk show
- Presented by: Chris Hardwick
- Country of origin: United States
- Original language: English
- No. of seasons: 3
- No. of episodes: 6

Production
- Executive producers: Michael Davies; Jen Kelly Patton; Brandon Monk; Chris Hardwick
- Production companies: Embassy Row; Sony Pictures Television; AMC Studios

Original release
- Network: AMC
- Release: February 15, 2016 – August 8, 2022

Related
- Better Call Saul

Talking Saul is a television aftershow hosted by Chris Hardwick that discussed episodes of the AMC television series Better Call Saul, that aired from February 15, 2016 to August 8, 2022. Guests featured on the show included cast and crew members from Better Call Saul.

== Broadcast and format ==
The show uses the same format as Talking Dead and Talking Bad, other aftershows hosted by Hardwick. AMC announced that Talking Saul would air after the second season Better Call Saul premiere on February 15, 2016, and again after the second-season finale on April 18, 2016. It returned following the season 3 premiere and finale.

The show did not return for Better Call Saul's fourth and fifth season, with no word from AMC on its status. This caused some to believe the show was cancelled.

Talking Saul resumed airing for the mid-season finale and the penultimate episode of Better Call Saul's sixth season, with Hardwick returning as host.

== Episodes ==
=== Season 1 (2016) ===
No.	Episode discussed	Guests	Original release date	U.S. viewers
1	"Switch"	Vince Gilligan, Peter Gould, Bob Odenkirk and Rhea Seehorn	February 15, 2016	744,000
2	"Klick"	Jonathan Banks, Vince Gilligan and Peter Gould	April 18, 2016	641,000

=== Season 2 (2017) ===
No.	Episode discussed	Guests	Original release date	U.S. viewers
3	"Mabel"	Vince Gilligan, Peter Gould, Jonathan Banks and Rhea Seehorn	April 10, 2017	545,000
4	"Lantern"	Peter Gould, Patrick Fabian and Michael Mando; Michael McKean via satellite	June 19, 2017	589,000

=== Season 3 (2022) ===
No.	Episode discussed	Guests	Original release date	U.S. viewers
5	"Plan and Execution"	Peter Gould, Bob Odenkirk, Rhea Seehorn and Patrick Fabian	May 23, 2022	454,000
6	"Waterworks"	Vince Gilligan, Peter Gould and Bob Odenkirk; Rhea Seehorn via satellite	August 8, 2022	532,000

== See also ==
- Talking Bad – a similar talk show hosted by Hardwick which discusses Breaking Bad's final eight episodes.
- Talking Dead – a similar talk show hosted by Hardwick which discusses episodes of The Walking Dead and Fear the Walking Dead.
- Talking Preacher – a similar talk show hosted by Hardwick which discusses select episodes of Preacher.
- Talking with Chris Hardwick – a similar talk show hosted by Hardwick that features him interviewing guests from the world of pop culture.
