= Owner's Manual (TV series) =

- Genre: Reality
- Presented by: Ed Sanders; Marcus Hunt
- Country of origin: United States
- Original language: English
- No. of seasons: 1
- No. of episodes: 8

Production
- Executive producers: Alex Piper; Jerry McNutt; Jonathan Koch; Steve Michaels
- Running time: 22 minutes
- Production company: Asylum Entertainment

Original release
- Network: AMC
- Release: August 15 – September 26, 2013

Owner's Manual is an American reality television series that airs on AMC and premiered on August 15, 2013. Announced in November 2012, the series' first season consists of eight, half-hour episodes. Owner's Manual tests whether it is best to read the included owner’s manual or not by representing each side of the divide in a weekly challenge. Ed Sanders and Marcus Hunt attempt to operate machinery and technology each week with one man working strictly from the manual and the other using his instincts.

== Episodes ==
No.	Title	Original release date	Prod. code	U.S. viewers (millions)
1	"Stunt Plane"	August 15, 2013	101	0.32
Marcus and Ed are challenged to master aerobatic maneuvers in stunt planes.
2	"Locomotive"	August 15, 2013	102	0.24
The men are asked to attach rail cars to a locomotive in hopes to sustain a ride without losing the cargo.
3	"Off Roading"	August 22, 2013	103	0.21
Racing high-performance vehicles through Nevada.
4	"Brewery"	August 29, 2013	104	0.24
Brewing beer in Hawaii.
5	"Yarder"	September 5, 2013	105	0.15
Logging and hauling massive logs in Oregon.
6	"Tall Ships"	September 12, 2013	106	0.26
Sailing off the Californian coast.
7	"Carnival"	September 19, 2013	107	N/A
Building at a carnival.
8	"Rock Quarry"	September 26, 2013	108	N/A
Blasting quarry rock on a mountainside.

== Reception ==
Robert Lloyd of The Los Angeles Times says the show is guided by charm and pretense. Melissa Camacho of Common Sense Media gave the show 3 out of 5 stars saying that while the show is not the most sophisticated of shows, watching how the two handle things is interesting.
