= Talking Dead =

- Genre: Aftershow
- Directed by: Russell Norman; Mike Corey
- Presented by: Chris Hardwick
- Composers: Freeplay Music; The Music Collective
- Country of origin: United States
- Original language: English
- No. of seasons: 10
- No. of episodes: 229 (and 13 specials) (list of episodes)

Production
- Executive producers: Michael Davies; Jen Kelly Patton; Brandon Monk
- Producers: Sharon Lord; Chris Hardwick; Cash Hartzell; Chris Smith
- Production locations: CBS Television City, Hollywood, California; Hollywood Forever Cemetery, Santa Monica Boulevard (season 6 premiere)
- Editors: Eugene Baldovino; Life Garland; Todd Muscat; Jason Pauley
- Production companies: Embassy Row; AMC Studios

Original release
- Network: AMC
- Release: October 16, 2011 – November 20, 2022

Related
- The Walking Dead; Fear the Walking Dead; The Walking Dead: World Beyond

Talking Dead is a live television aftershow in which host Chris Hardwick discusses episodes of the AMC television series The Walking Dead, Fear the Walking Dead and The Walking Dead: World Beyond with guests, including celebrity fans, cast members, and crew from the series.

== Broadcast and format ==
The series features host Chris Hardwick discussing the latest episode with guests who are fans of the series. Cast and crew from The Walking Dead and Fear the Walking Dead also appear on the talk show. Segments on Talking Dead include an "In Memoriam" highlighting the deaths from the episode, an online poll, episode trivia, behind-the-scenes footage, and questions from fans via phone, from the audience, Facebook, Twitter, or from the official Talking Dead website. After the on-air episode ends, a bonus 15– 20-minute segment continues online for the 30-minute episodes; there would be a bonus 5- to 10-minute online segment for the 60-minute episodes; Hardwick refers to this bonus segment as "Talking Talking Dead".

The series premiered on October 16, 2011, following the encore presentation of the second-season premiere of The Walking Dead. When the series returned on February 10, 2013, from the season three mid-season finale, the series moved to 10:00 pm, directly following The Walking Dead and expanded to one hour. Hardwick stated that having the show go an hour as opposed to half an hour allowed more "breathing room" and more time to discuss the topics with the guests/fans.

Producers that were regular guests of Talking Dead include: creator of The Walking Dead Robert Kirkman, seasons 2–3 showrunner Glen Mazzara, director and executive producer Greg Nicotero, executive producer Gale Anne Hurd, and seasons 4–8 showrunner Scott M. Gimple. Guests listed after "with" were surprise guests for the episode. Robert Kirkman and Greg Nicotero have the most appearances of any crew member at 10 episodes each. Lauren Cohan is the most featured cast member with 7 episodes. Yvette Nicole Brown is the outside guest with the most appearances at 10 episodes.

On three of the episodes at the end of season 2 of Talking Dead, musicians featured on The Walking Dead's soundtrack performed at the end of the show. On the first half of season 3 of Talking Dead, the "Kill of the Week" feature was included; in addition, the show took questions from the studio audience. In season 3 of Talking Dead, "fan of the week" was introduced for fans who used the "Dead Yourself" mobile app. The show also introduced "Survival Tips", which gave tips on how to survive if a hypothetical zombie apocalypse really happened. Season 5 began showcasing fan art.

The series became known for often having members of the cast appear after the episode in which their characters were killed (for example, Laurie Holden for "Welcome to the Tombs"). Recognizing that this may spoil viewers, the show now tries its best to avoid this, though the trend still appears from time to time. Notably Emily Kinney was not announced as the guest actor for the episode following "Coda" until the program's airtime due to her character's sudden death at the end of the accompanying episode.

Talking Dead also began airing after episodes of Fear the Walking Dead's second season, which premiered on April 10, 2016.

On July 13, 2018, it was announced that longtime guest Yvette Nicole Brown would temporarily take over Hardwick's role as host for Talking Dead beginning on August 5 for The Walking Dead season 9 preview special. The decision was made to replace Hardwick because AMC was completing their assessment related to Hardwick who was accused of sexual harassment by his ex-girlfriend Chloe Dykstra. On July 25, AMC announced that Hardwick would be reinstated as host beginning with the August 12 broadcast, and that Brown would guest host the August 5 broadcast. AMC made the following statement, "Following a comprehensive assessment by AMC, working with Ivy Kagan Bierman of the firm Loeb & Loeb, who has considerable experience in this area, Chris Hardwick will return to AMC as the host of Talking Dead and Talking with Chris Hardwick. We take these matters very seriously and given the information available to us after a very careful review, including interviews with numerous individuals, we believe returning Chris to work is the appropriate step." An executive producer and several staffers left the show due to the decision to allow his return.

In June 2019, it was confirmed that Talking Dead would not be broadcast after every episode of Fear the Walking Dead's fifth season. An episode was broadcast following the season premiere, and it returned after the mid-season finale of Fear the Walking Dead.

== Series overview ==
Season	Episodes	Originally released	
Season	Episodes	First released	Last released
1	13	October 16, 2011	March 18, 2012
2	16	October 14, 2012	March 31, 2013
3	16	October 13, 2013	March 30, 2014
4	16	October 12, 2014	March 29, 2015
5	30	October 11, 2015	October 2, 2016
6	28	October 23, 2016	October 15, 2017
7	31	October 22, 2017	September 30, 2018
8	20	October 7, 2018	September 29, 2019
9	30	October 6, 2019	June 13, 2021
10	29	August 22, 2021	November 20, 2022

AMC officially counts the first season of Talking Dead as season 2 and each subsequent season one number higher than is listed here. This is so that the season numbers for episodes of Talking Dead match the season numbers for episodes of The Walking Dead that they discuss.

== Accolades ==
For the 67th Primetime Creative Arts Emmy Awards, the series was nominated for Outstanding Interactive Program. It was nominated again the year after.

== See also ==
- Talking Bad (2013): a similar talk show hosted by Hardwick which discusses Breaking Bad's final eight episodes.
- Talking Saul (2016–2022): a similar talk show hosted by Hardwick which discusses Better Call Saul's selected episodes.
- Talking Preacher (2016–17): a similar talk show hosted by Hardwick which discusses Preacher's selected episodes.
- Talking with Chris Hardwick (2017): a similar talk show hosted by Hardwick that features him interviewing celebrity guests.
