= Shipmates (TV series) =

- Genre: Dating game show
- Presented by: Chris Hardwick
- Country of origin: United States
- Original language: English
- No. of seasons: 2

Production
- Running time: 30 minutes
- Production companies: Hurricane Entertainment Corp. Tomlin-Schecter-Young Productions; Sony Pictures Television (Note: Credited as Columbia TriStar Television Distribution (2001; season 1) and Columbia TriStar Domestic Television (2001–2002; seasons 1–2).)

Original release
- Network: Syndicated
- Release: August 27, 2001 – 2003

Shipmates is an American syndicated television show that ran for two seasons from 2001 to 2003.

Reruns later ran on the cable channel Spike TV. The show was created by Hurricane Entertainment and the executive producer was John Tomlin. Chris Hardwick was the host. Participants in the show were sent on a blind date on a Carnival Cruise ship, with camera crews following the couple around the clock.
