= Shipmate (company) =

- Industry: Logistics
- Headquarters: Philadelphia, Pennsylvania, USA

Shipmate Fulfillment is an American order fulfillment company that provides warehousing, distribution, and third-party logistics services.

== History ==
Prior to founding Shipmate Fulfillment, Elie Antar founded the Valu-Plus chain of variety stores in 1973. The Antar family owned and operated the chain until it was sold to Rainbow Shops in 2011.

Elie Antar's son Brian began using the family's warehouse as a wholesale distributor and online retailer in 2014. After a dispute with Amazon about the fulfillment of the company's orders, Elie and Brian founded their own fulfillment company, Shipmate Fulfillment, in 2019. It is located in Philadelphia, Pennsylvania.

During the COVID-19 pandemic in 2020, Shipmate Fulfillment implemented a policy of looking to hire laid-off service industry workers to work in its warehouse. After pandemic restrictions were lifted, Shipmate Fulfillment held a job fair in Philadelphia in June 2021.

== Services ==
Shipmate Fulfillment provides warehousing, packaging and shipping for e-commerce and B2B companies in their 300,000 SF warehouse in Philadelphia. The company works with businesses in a variety of industries, including apparel, housewares, electronics, accessories, and more.

== See also ==
- Fulfillment house
