= Preacher (TV series) =

American television series developed for AMC

- Title card variant from the pilot
- Genre: Action; Black comedy; Dark fantasy; Drama; Horror; Neo-Western; Southern Gothic
- Based on: Preacher by: Garth Ennis; Steve Dillon
- Developed by: Sam Catlin; Seth Rogen; Evan Goldberg
- Showrunner: Sam Catlin
- Starring: Dominic Cooper; Joseph Gilgun; Ruth Negga; Lucy Griffiths; W. Earl Brown; Derek Wilson; Ian Colletti; Tom Brooke; Anatol Yusef; Graham McTavish; Pip Torrens; Noah Taylor; Julie Ann Emery; Malcolm Barrett; Colin Cunningham; Betty Buckley; Mark Harelik; Tyson Ritter
- Composer: Dave Porter
- Country of origin: United States
- Original language: English
- No. of seasons: 4
- No. of episodes: 43 (list of episodes)

Production
- Executive producers: Sam Catlin; Seth Rogen; Evan Goldberg; James Weaver; Neal H. Moritz; Vivian Cannon; Ori Marmur; Ken F. Levin; Jason Netter; Garth Ennis; Steve Dillon; Michael Slovis; Dominic Cooper; Ruth Negga; Joseph Gilgun
- Producer: Matt Tauber
- Production locations: Albuquerque, New Mexico; New Orleans, Louisiana; Australia
- Cinematography: Bill Pope; John Grillo
- Editors: Kelley Dixon; Hunter M. Via; Daniel Gabbe; Tyler L. Cook
- Camera setup: Single-camera
- Running time: 42–65 minutes
- Production companies: Short Drive Entertainment; Point Grey Pictures; Original Film; Kickstart Productions; KFL Nightsky Productions; AMC Studios; Sony Pictures Television

Original release
- Network: AMC
- Release: May 22, 2016 – September 29, 2019

Preacher is an American black comedy action horror television series developed by Sam Catlin, Evan Goldberg, and Seth Rogen for AMC starring Dominic Cooper, Joseph Gilgun and Ruth Negga. The series is based on the comic book series Preacher created by Garth Ennis and Steve Dillon and published by DC Comics' Vertigo imprint. The series premiered on May 22, 2016, and ran for four seasons, concluding on September 29, 2019.

== Premise ==
Jesse Custer is a hard-drinking, chain-smoking preacher who, enduring a crisis of faith, becomes infused with an extraordinary power. He embarks on a quest to better understand his new gift and literally find God, alongside his trigger-happy ex-girlfriend Tulip and new vampire friend Cassidy.

== Cast and characters ==
=== Main ===
- Dominic Cooper as Jesse Custer, a preacher from Annville, Texas with a criminal past and a newly discovered superpower to command others to do as he says. Dominic Ruggieri portrays 10-year-old Jesse and Will Kindrachuk portrays teenage Jesse.
- Joseph Gilgun as Proinsias Cassidy, a vice-loving vampire from Ireland who joins Jesse and Tulip on their search for God.
- Ruth Negga as Tulip O'Hare, Jesse's volatile, hell-raising girlfriend. Ashley Aufderheide portrays 10-year old Tulip.
  - Negga also played Lucy O'Hare-Custer in the final scene of the series finale.
- Lucy Griffiths as Emily Woodrow, a single mother, waitress, church organist, bookkeeper, and Jesse's loyal right hand. (season 1)
- W. Earl Brown as Sheriff Hugo Root, Annville's local lawman. (main season 1; guest season 2)
- Derek Wilson as Donnie Schenck, Odin Quincannon's right-hand man and Jesse's rival since childhood. (season 1)
- Ian Colletti as Eugene "Arseface" Root, Jesse's most faithful parishioner and Sheriff Root's son, whose face is horribly disfigured due to a botched suicide attempt.
- Tom Brooke as Fiore, one of two Adelphi angels tasked with watching the half-demon, half-angelic creature named Genesis. (main season 1; guest seasons 2 and 4)
- Anatol Yusef as DeBlanc, one of two Adelphi angels tasked with watching the half-demon, half-angelic creature named Genesis. (season 1)
- Graham McTavish as William Munny, the Saint of Killers, a supernatural, unstoppable killing machine summoned from Hell to destroy Jesse.
- Pip Torrens as Herr Klaus Helmut Starr, member of the Grail, a powerful, super-secret organization. Starr was briefly introduced in the season 1 episode "The Possibilities", although played by a different actor. (cameo season 1; main seasons 2–4)
- Noah Taylor as Adolf Hitler / David Hilter, an inmate in Hell. (seasons 2–4)
- Julie Ann Emery as Sarah Featherstone, one of the Grail's best operatives. (seasons 2–4)
- Malcolm Barrett as Hoover, one of the Grail's best operatives. (recurring season 2; main season 3)
- Colin Cunningham as T.C., a henchman of Marie L'Angelle. This character is briefly introduced via flashback in the second-season finale played by a stand-in. (cameo season 2; main season 3)
- Betty Buckley as Marie "Gran'ma" L'Angelle, Jesse Custer's grandmother. This character first appears via flashback in the second-season episode "Backdoors" played by Julie Oliver-Touchstone. (cameo season 2; main season 3)
- Mark Harelik as himself / God (guest seasons 1–2; recurring season 3; main season 4)
- Tyson Ritter as Humperdoo / The Messiah and Jesus Christ, the last living descendant of Jesus Christ. Christ appears in the fourth season. (guest season 2; recurring season 3; main season 4)

=== Recurring ===
- Jackie Earle Haley as Odin Quincannon, a powerful man in Annville who runs Quincannon Meat & Power, a 125-year-old family-run cattle slaughterhouse business. The original pilot featured Elizabeth Perkins as Vyla Quincannon, a female version of the character, but the writers ultimately opted to make Quincannon male as in the comics. (season 1)
- Marie Wagenman as Saint of Killers Daughter, only child of Saint of Killers who dies an early death, which torments her father for eternity.
- Ricky Mabe as Miles Person, the mayor of Annville. (season 1)
- Jamie Anne Allman as Betsy Schenck, a masochistic woman who is regularly beaten by her husband, Donnie. (season 1)
- Nathan Darrow as John Custer, Jesse's preacher father. (seasons 1 and 4)
- Juliana Potter as Susan, a killer seraphim angel. (season 1)
- Ronald Guttman as Denis, an aged son of Cassidy's who lives in New Orleans. (season 2)
- Justin Prentice as Tyler, a prisoner in Hell. (season 2)
- Amy Hill as Ms. Mannering, a warden of Hell. (season 2)
- Jeremy Childs as Jody, a henchman of Marie L'Angelle who killed Jesse's father. (season 3)
- Jonny Coyne as Allfather D'Aronique (season 3)
- Adam Croasdell as Eccarius (season 3)
- Prema Cruz as Sabina Boyd (season 3)
- Jason Douglas as Satan (season 3)
- Christopher Kirby as Chief Wittman, Herr Star's nemesis in law enforcement (season 4)
- David Field as Archangel (season 4)
- Sally McLean as Barb, a police officer and Chief Wittman's partner with equal hatred for Herr Starr (season 4)
- Ditch Davey as Pilot Steve, who is stranded with Jesse Custer at sea until his death by shark bite (season 4)

== Episodes ==
Season	Episodes	Originally released	
Season	Episodes	First released	Last released
1	10	May 22, 2016	July 31, 2016
2	13	June 25, 2017	September 11, 2017
3	10	June 24, 2018	August 26, 2018
4	10	August 4, 2019	September 29, 2019

== Talking Preacher ==
Talking Preacher was a live aftershow hosted by Chris Hardwick that featured guests discussing episodes of Preacher. The show used the same format as Talking Dead, Talking Bad, and Talking Saul, which were also hosted by Hardwick.

The first episode of Talking Preacher debuted immediately following the pilot encore on May 29, 2016, with guests Seth Rogen, Evan Goldberg, Dominic Cooper and Sam Catlin, and received 538,000 viewers. The second installment aired following the Preacher season one finale on July 31, 2016, with guests Rogen, Goldberg and Ian Colletti, and received 620,000 viewers.

The aftershow returned for the first two episodes of Preacher's second season, with an installment airing directly after the second episode on June 26, 2017, with guests Dominic Cooper, Graham McTavish and Sam Catlin, and received 441,000 viewers. A third episode aired following the second-season finale which included guests Dominic Cooper, Sam Catlin, Ian Colletti and Pip Torrens, and received 298,000 viewers.

== Production ==
=== Development ===
A TV adaptation for the comic book series had been planned in 2006, when Mark Steven Johnson purchased the rights and pitched the series to HBO. Johnson was a big fan of Preacher, but he believed that a two-hour movie would not be able to do justice to the property. In an interview with MovieWeb, he said that he didn't want the storyline to be loyal, but "exact", and that adapting all 75 issues would let the show run for 6 years. Johnson would produce the series and write the pilot, and expressed interest in having Kevin Smith and Robert Rodriguez direct episodes. Howard Deutch was reported to be directing the pilot, but Johnson said in another interview that he had only discussed the series with Deutch and it would all depend who would direct after the screenplay was finished. In 2008, Johnson revealed that the new head of HBO deemed the show to be too violent and demanded a revamp. Johnson refused, and HBO cancelled production.

After HBO abandoned Preacher, Neal H. Moritz of Original Film purchased the film rights for Columbia Pictures in 2008. John August was brought on board to write a script and Sam Mendes was attached to direct. Mendes left the film to work on Skyfall, and D.J. Caruso replaced him. Caruso later said that the film was put on the backburner because he was working on another film for Sony.

On November 16, 2013, it was announced that AMC was developing a TV series based on the DC Vertigo comic book series Preacher. On November 18, 2013, it was revealed that Seth Rogen and Evan Goldberg were developing the series pilot with Sam Catlin, and that it would be distributed by Sony Pictures Television. On February 6, 2014, AMC ordered a pilot script to be written by Rogen and Goldberg, and confirmed Sam Catlin would serve as showrunner. On December 3, 2014, AMC ordered the pilot, written by Catlin, to be filmed. Comic creators Steve Dillon and Garth Ennis serve as co-executive producers for the series. From season 3, the show's three lead actors–Dominic Cooper, Ruth Negga and Joseph Gilgun–serve as co-executive producers.

On May 14, 2015, Rogen revealed that filming on the pilot episode of Preacher had started. Rogen additionally revealed that he and Goldberg would be directing the pilot.

The series was officially picked up on September 9, 2015 with a ten-episode order which premiered on May 22, 2016. On June 29, 2016, AMC renewed the series for a 13-episode second season that premiered on June 25, 2017. On October 26, 2017, it was announced the series was renewed for a third season, which premiered on June 24, 2018, and consisted of 10 episodes. On November 29, 2018, it was announced that the series was renewed for a fourth season, with production beginning in early 2019 in Australia. On April 8, 2019, it was announced that the fourth season would be the series' final season and that it would premiere on August 4, 2019.

=== Casting ===
In March 2015, Ruth Negga was cast as Tulip O'Hare, the ex-girlfriend of Jesse Custer, and Joseph Gilgun was cast as Cassidy, an Irish vampire and the best friend of Custer. In April 2015, Lucy Griffiths was cast as Emily Woodrow, a character described as a no-nonsense single mother of three who is a waitress, the church organist, bookkeeper and Jesse's loyal right hand." Also in April, it was confirmed that Dominic Cooper would play Custer.

=== Specials ===
AMC aired a marathon of the first five episodes of Preacher from June 30 to July 1, 2016, with bonus, behind-the-scenes footage within each episode.

== Reception ==
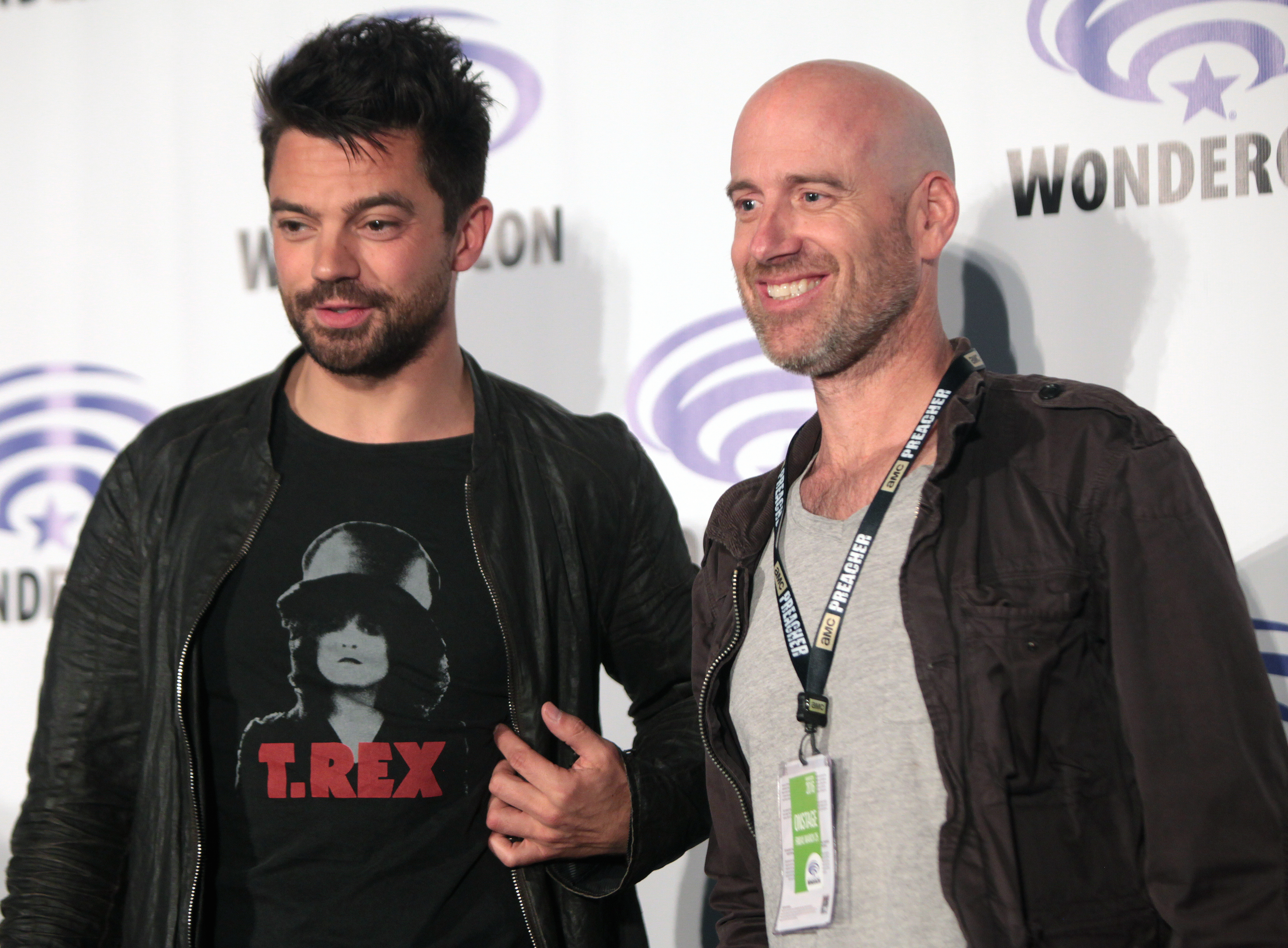
Dominic Cooper (left) and Sam Catlin (right) promoting Preacher at the 2016 WonderCon in California

=== Critical reception ===
The first season received largely positive reviews from critics. Review aggregation website Rotten Tomatoes gave the season an approval rating of 89%, based on 243 reviews, with an average rating of 7.55/10. The site's critical consensus states: "A thrilling celebration of the bizarre, Preacher boasts enough gore, glee, and guile to make this visually stunning adaptation a must-see for fans of the comic and newcomers alike". Metacritic, which uses a weighted average, found that the first season received "generally favorable reviews" with a score of 76 out of 100, based on 37 critics. Eric Goldman of IGN gave the pilot episode an 8.8/10, praising the "great mixture of comic and horror elements" and the "excellent casting", particularly praising Ruth Negga's performance as Tulip.

The second season received generally positive reviews from critics. On Rotten Tomatoes, the season has an approval rating of 91%, based on 179 reviews, with an average rating of 7.65/10. The site's critical consensus states: "Preacher's sophomore season benefits from more focused storytelling, without sacrificing any of its gorgeous, violent, insane fun". On Metacritic, the series again received "generally favorable reviews" with a score of 76 out of 100 for the second season, based on 9 critics.

The third season received generally favorable reviews from critics. On Rotten Tomatoes, the season has an approval rating of 92%, based on 91 reviews, with an average rating of 7.7/10. The site's critical consensus states: "Preacher returns to its delightful debauchery, but with a steadier hand and better balance, elevating the drama without taking the edge off". On IGN, Jesse Scheeden gave the season premiere a score of 8.7 out of 10 and claimed that "Preacher is finally venturing into one of the best and most unsettling pieces of the comic, and so far the new season seems to be headed in the right direction. 'Angelville' succeeds in telling a somber, focused story, one that establishes the relationship between Jesse and his grandmother and making our heroes feel more vulnerable than ever".

On Rotten Tomatoes, the fourth season has an approval rating of 77%, based on 74 reviews, with an average rating of 7.2/10. The site's critical consensus states: "Preacher returns as creatively violent, bloody, and profane as ever, but it seems to be running out of steam in its final season".

=== Ratings ===
Viewership and ratings per season of Preacher
Season	Timeslot (ET)	Episodes	First aired		Last aired		Avg. viewers (millions)
Season	Timeslot (ET)	Episodes	Date	Viewers (millions)	Date	Viewers (millions)	Avg. viewers (millions)
1	Sunday 10:00 pm (premiere); Sunday 9:00 pm	10	May 22, 2016	2.38	July 31, 2016	1.72	1.60
2	Sunday 10:00 pm (premiere); Monday 9:00 pm	13	June 25, 2017	1.69	September 11, 2017	0.97	1.16
3	Sunday 10:00 pm	10	June 24, 2018	0.84	August 26, 2018	1.02	0.85
4	Sunday 9:00 pm (premiere); Sunday 10:00 pm	10	August 4, 2019	0.62	September 29, 2019	0.51	0.53

== Awards and nominations ==
Year	Award	Category	Nominee	Result	Ref
2016	Hollywood Post Alliance Awards	Outstanding Sound - Television	Richard Yawn, Mark Linden, Tara Paul	Nominated	
2017	American Society of Cinematographers Awards	Outstanding Achievement in Cinematography in Regular Series for Commercial Television	John Grillo	Nominated	
2017	Art Directors Guild Awards	One Hour Contemporary Single-Camera Television Series	David Blass, Mark Zuelzke, Kirsten Oglesby, Derek Jensen, Gregory G. Sandoval, Taura C.C. Rivera, Tyler Standen, Brandon Arrington, Amy Lynn Umezu, Edward McLoughlin	Nominated	
2017	Saturn Awards	Best Fantasy Television Series	Preacher	Nominated	
2018	Saturn Awards	Best Horror Television Series	Preacher	Nominated	
2019	Saturn Awards	Best Horror Television Series	Preacher	Nominated	
