= AMC (TV channel) =

American TV channel

- Current logo as of 2019.
- Country: United States
- Broadcast area: North America (United States); Canada
- Headquarters: New York City, United States

Programming
- Language: English
- Picture format: 1080i HDTV (downscaled to 480i letterboxed for the SDTV feed)

Ownership
- Owner: AMC Global Media
- Sister channels: BBC America; IFC; Sundance TV; We TV

History
- Launched: December 1, 1980; 45 years ago
- Former names: Montage (1980–1984); American Movie Classics (1984–2002)

Links
- Website: amc.com

Availability

Streaming media
- Service(s): Philo, YouTube TV, Sling TV, DirecTV Stream

AMC is an American cable television channel. Owned by AMC Global Media, the channel primarily airs acquired feature films, as well as original and acquired drama series.

Launched in late-1980 on New York City's Cablevision as Montage, it originally focused on vintage black and white films, presented uncut and commercial-free. In 1984, the network changed its name to American Movie Classics (AMC). In 1998, AMC began to transition away from its original premium format, becoming an advertising-supported service.

In 2002, AMC was relaunched with a new format, dropping the "American Movie Classics" branding and shifting its focus to contemporary films. In the late-2000s and early-2010s, AMC began to increasingly focus on "prestige" dramas, including the period drama Mad Men, crime drama Breaking Bad, and its spin-off Better Call Saul. These series would receive critical acclaim, heightening the profile of AMC as one of several "premium" basic cable networks synonymous with the era of "Peak TV". Its post-apocalyptic horror drama The Walking Dead would also become highly-viewed, and in 2014 would achieve the highest viewership for a non-sports program on cable in U.S. history.

As of December 2024, AMC was available in approximately 60 million U.S. pay-TV households. This marks a decline from 65.1 million households in December 2023 and 94.8 million in July 2015, reflecting the broader trend of cord-cutting and the shift toward streaming platforms.

== History ==
=== 1984–2002: Focus on classic films ===
Its origins can be traced back to the launch of its predecessor network Montage which was first launched in late 1980 by Rainbow Media, and initially offered classic movies largely made prior to the 1970s under a commercial-free format to Cablevision subscribers in the New York area. The network changed its name to American Movie Classics, originally abbreviated as AMC, on October 1, 1984, and became a premium channel at the same time. AMC's original format continued to focus on classic movies which were aired during the afternoon and early evening hours in a commercial-free, generally unedited, uncut, uninterrupted and uncolorized format.

In 1985, Rainbow became involved in a dispute with Ted Turner's Turner Broadcasting System over broadcast rights to the MGM/UA film library. On July 30 of that year, Rainbow had paid $45 million to license up to 800 pre-1950 films from the library. Weeks later, Turner announced an agreement to purchase the film studio with the intention of airing the films on his Superstation WTBS. Rainbow claimed it had exclusive basic cable rights to the films for the next five years. Despite its widespread cable carriage, Turner claimed that because WTBS was a broadcast station, the restriction did not apply. This led to both companies filing lawsuits against each other in September, and MGM/UA terminating the agreement with Rainbow after alleging that Rainbow had breached it by announcing its intention to offer a premium tier to the AMC cable service. By October, the lawsuit was settled. Rainbow received $50 million and agreed to terminate the licensing deal on December 31, 1985, before which time AMC would not be allowed to convert to a basic service. Turner completed the acquisition of MGM in early 1986, but his ownership was short-lived and he sold it back to the previous owner months later. However, he retained the film library and executed his original plan to air the movies on WTBS and later on his new networks Turner Network Television and Turner Classic Movies, a direct competitor to AMC.

The new movie network struggled to gain carriage. By March 1986, it had only 300,000 subscribers. To solve this problem, Cablevision and CBS (which became half owner of Rainbow about a year earlier) worked out a deal with the nation's largest cable television provider, Tele-Communications Inc. (TCI). TCI gained a one-third interest in AMC (but not Bravo, Rainbow's other network) and in exchange made AMC available as an offering for most of its 3.9 million subscribers. (TCI's Liberty Media division eventually would create another premium service—Encore, which also originally focused on older films, mainly from the 1960s to the 1980s – five years later in April 1991). During its early years, it was not uncommon for AMC to host a marathon of Marx Brothers films, or show classics such as the original 1925 release of The Phantom of the Opera. In 1987, the channel began to be carried on the basic cable tiers of many cable providers. In July 1988, AMC added its first original programming: Classic Stories From Classic Stars (featuring interviews), followed later that year by Star Facts (biographies) and a mini-documentary series Making of a Classic. By 1989, AMC was available to 39 million subscribers in the U.S.

On December 1, 1990, AMC began operating on a 24-hour-a-day schedule.

Beginning in 1993, AMC presented an annual Film Preservation Festival to raise awareness of and funding for film preservation. Coordinated with The Film Foundation, an industry group that was founded by acclaimed director Martin Scorsese, the festival was originally conceived as a multi-day marathon presenting rare and previously lost films, many airing for the first time on television, along with behind-the-scenes reports on the technical and monetary issues faced by those engaged in archival restoration. Portions of the festival were often dedicated to all-day marathons focusing on a single performer. During its fifth anniversary year in 1998, Scorsese credited the Festival for creating "not only a greater awareness, but [...] more of an expectation now to see restored films." In 1996, curator of the Museum of Modern Art Mary Lee Bandy called the Festival "the most important public event in support of film preservation." By its tenth anniversary in 2003, the Festival had raised $2 million from the general public, which The Film Foundation divided among its five-member archives.

In 1993, Cablevision's Rainbow Media division became the majority owner of the channel, when it bought out Liberty Media's 50% stake in AMC; incidentally in August of that year, Liberty announced its intent to purchase the 25% stake in the channel that Cablevision held at the time, with the Turner Broadcasting System helping to finance the buyout that included an option for TBS to eventually acquire AMC outright. The following year, Time Warner (which later purchased rival Turner Classic Movies following the company's 1996 acquisition of the Turner Broadcasting System) also attempted to acquire at least part of Liberty Media's stake in AMC.

In June 1995, AMC became involved with another dispute with Turner. It filed a $550 million breach of contract lawsuit against Turner Entertainment, which alleged that the company violated AMC's exclusive cable television rights to the pre-1950 Warner Bros. Pictures film library to broadcast approximately 30 times between July 1994 and April 1995, charging that Turner's objective in violating the contract was "to gain unfair advantage for the Turner Classic Movies cable network (which debuted in April 1994) at the expense of AMC."; Turner owns rights to the RKO Radio Pictures film library and licensed RKO's films to AMC in an output deal that was slated to last through 2004. Under the terms of the deal, AMC obtained the RKO titles in exclusive windows.

Around this time, General Electric/NBC owned a stake in AMC – which it divested in the early 2000s. From 1996 to 1998, AMC aired its first original series, Remember WENN, a half-hour scripted series about a radio station during the peak of radio's influence in the 1930s. The show was well received by both critics and its enthusiastic fans, but was abruptly cancelled after its fourth season following management changes at the channel (WENN was followed up by The Lot, which lasted for only 17 episodes). Despite a well publicized write-in campaign to save the series, the show was not renewed for its originally scheduled fifth season.

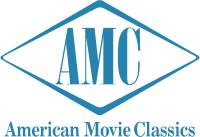
AMC logo used from 1999 to 2002

One popular AMC program was American Pop! (originally intended as a preview of a new 24-hour cable channel), which ran from 1998 to 2003 and featured movies from the 1950s and 1960s aimed at baby boomers (such as Beach Blanket Bingo and Ski Party). Of particular interest to movie completists were the segments that AMC played to fill out the timeslot (Saturday nights from 10:00 p.m. to 12:00 a.m. Eastern Time): classic movie trailers, drive-in movie ads and snipes (bits extolling viewers to visit the snack bar, etc.), along with music videos cribbed from movie musicals from the period.

The majority of the films presented on AMC during the 1990s had originally been released by Paramount Pictures, 20th Century Fox, Columbia Pictures, and Universal Pictures. The channel also occasionally showed classic silent films. The regular hosts of the telecasts were Bob Dorian and later, Nick Clooney (brother of singer Rosemary and father of actor and businessman George), as well as New York City radio personality Gene Klavan from WNEW (1130 AM, now WBBR). Another WNEW alum, Al "Jazzbo" Collins, provided his voice for the "Jazzbo's Swingin' Soundies" series of interstitials.

For most of its first 18 years in existence, AMC provided uncut and uncolorized films without commercial interruption. Its revenue came from carriage fees provided by the cable providers that maintained carriage agreements with the channel. However, in 1998, AMC began accepting traditional advertising, incorporating limited commercial interruptions between films (its sister movie channel Romance Classics, which had launched only one year earlier, became an entirely ad-supported channel at that point). By 2001, AMC had also incorporated commercial breaks during its movie telecasts. As a result of this move, Turner Classic Movies became the only one of the two classic film-focused networks to present their films commercial-free.

=== 2002–2009: Format change and expansion into original programming ===
AMC logo, used from September 30, 2002, to March 30, 2013

On September 30, 2002, AMC underwent a significant rebranding, changing its format from a classic movie channel, to a more general focus on movies from all eras – as well as shortening its name to just the "AMC" abbreviation, and introducing a new logo (a rectangular outline with a lowercase and uppercase "aMC" text) and a new slogan that says TV for Movie people. Kate McEnroe, then-president of Rainbow Media, cited lack of subsidies from cable providers as the reason for the addition of advertising, and cited ad agencies who insist on programming relevant to their products' consumers as the reason for the shift to recent movies instead of just classics. At the time of the format switchover, the company also attempted to launch a spin-off digital cable channel, AMC's Hollywood Classics, a commercial-free channel would have aired black-and-white classics from the 1930s through the 1950s that American Movie Classics had been airing up until its format changeover; however, the new channel never launched.

AMC also gradually brought back original programming. In 2004, AMC aired its first reality series, FilmFakers; the show featured out-of-work actors who believed they were auditioning for a major role in a real movie, only to be told that they were the subject of a prank and no film actually existed. A New York Times article on the show said that "FilmFakers may go down as one of the meanest reality series yet." From 2003 to 2007, AMC was a channel focused on American films partially classics as well as documentaries about film history such as Backstory and Movies that Shook the World.

In late 2007, AMC debuted its first original drama series Mad Men, a period piece about Madison Avenue advertising executives in the 1960s. The show was immediately lauded by critics, and won 16 Primetime Emmy Awards and a Peabody Award. Breaking Bad, a drama series about Walter White, a cancer-stricken chemistry teacher involved in making and dealing methamphetamine (played by Bryan Cranston, who had been known primarily for comedic roles in series such as Malcolm in the Middle prior to the series), premiered in 2008; also garnering critical acclaim, winning 16 Primetime Emmy Awards.

=== 2009–2013: "Story Matters Here" ===
On May 31, 2009, during the second-season finale of Breaking Bad, AMC rebranded with the introduction of a new slogan, "Story Matters Here". Later that year, the network premiered its second miniseries, The Prisoner. On January 4, 2010, AMC began airing infomercials on Monday through Saturday mornings from 6:00 to 9:00 a.m. Eastern Time; the Saturday morning infomercial block was eliminated after its March 25, 2011, airing as AMC added a Saturday block of western series and films the following week. 2010 also saw the premieres of the conspiracy thriller Rubicon, and The Walking Dead—a post-apocalyptic horror drama adapted from the comic book series of the same name. While Rubicon was cancelled, The Walking Dead became an major success; during its first season, it averaged between 4–6 million viewers. By its third season, it had begun to average 10–17 million viewers per-week.

AMC would become the flagship property of the then newly established AMC Networks in 2011, which was founded that year after Cablevision spun off Rainbow Media's assets into the newly established company. Cablevision founder Charles Dolan and his family continue to retain a controlling interest in the company. Also during this year, the network introduced two new dramas (The Killing and Hell on Wheels), two original web series (The Trivial Pursuits of Arthur Banks and The Walking Dead: Torn Apart), and Talking Dead—an aftershow that would air following new episodes of The Walking Dead. In 2012, AMC premiered three original reality series: The Pitch, Comic Book Men and Small Town Security; along with a second web series spun off from The Walking Dead, The Walking Dead: Cold Storage.

==== 2012 Dish Network carriage dispute ====
In July 2012, AMC was dropped from Dish Network, in conjunction with a carriage dispute with the satellite provider, citing that AMC Networks charged an excessive amount in retransmission consent payments from the service for carriage which was in disproportion with the lower audience viewership for the channels. AMC Networks cited the removal as being related to a breach of contract lawsuit filed against Dish Network by the channel's former parent Rainbow Media's Voom HD Networks in 2008 for improperly terminating its carriage contract; Dish Network denied that the lawsuit had any relation to the decision to remove AMC and its sister channels and that it ended the carriage agreement on its own terms. However, the two companies came to a resolution, bringing back the channel (and sister networks IFC, Sundance Channel and WE tv) to Dish in October 2012.

=== 2013–2016: "Something More" ===
AMC logo, used from 2013 to 2019

On March 31, 2013, during the third-season finale of The Walking Dead, AMC unveiled a rebranding campaign with the new slogan "Something More", and inverted the logo from a rectangular outlined box to a solid gold block with the network's acronymic name retained in the center. 2013 saw the channel's unscripted slate double with the additions of Owner's Manual, Showville, the second part of the final season of Breaking Bad, the Breaking Bad discussion series Talking Bad, and the second season of the unscripted series Freakshow, before being cancelled.

Also in April, Rectify, which was originally developed for AMC, premiered on AMC's sister channel Sundance Channel to jump-start that network's emerging slate of original scripted programming. It was then followed by the July announcement that fellow sister channel WE tv had picked up another series originally developed for AMC for the 2012-13 development slate, The Divide, to series.

In July 2013, the network announced that it had given series orders for two dramas: Turn: Washington's Spies (which premiered on April 6, 2014) and Halt and Catch Fire (which premiered on June 1, 2014). This marked the first time that AMC had four pilot orders picked up to series in the same cycle, the other two being The Divide and Low Winter Sun (the latter premiered on August 11, 2013, after the season premiere of the final season of Breaking Bad). The former two would both be renewed for second seasons while the latter two were cancelled after their first seasons. AMC would then pick up Into the Badlands for a six episode first season and Breaking Bad spinoff Better Call Saul for two seasons.

On October 9, 2014, it was announced that AMC would scrap its entire current and future unscripted slate outside Talking Dead and Comic Book Men. This announcement came shortly after AMC took over the United States co-production of the sci-fi drama Humans from Xbox Entertainment Studios. The fifth season of The Walking Dead premiered to a series high of 17.3 million viewers, overtaking the premiere of High School Musical 2 (Disney Channel) as the highest-rated non-sports program in U.S. cable history. At the end of October, it was announced that AMC had won the bidding war to air the miniseries The Night Manager. In 2015, the network premiered Fear the Walking Dead, a spin-off of The Walking Dead. In January 2015, AMC announced that they would be airing the eight part miniseries The Making of the Mob: New York.

In 2016, AMC introduced a new slate of original unscripted series, including Ride with Norman Reedus, Geeking Out, and new expansions of the Talking Dead format with Talking Saul, Talking Preacher, and Talking with Chris Hardwick.

=== Expansion of franchises, AMC+ (2019–present) ===
In October 2019, AMC announced a new Walking Dead spin-off, The Walking Dead: World Beyond, which premiered in October 2020. Amid the COVID-19 pandemic, AMC premiered the new talk show Friday Night In with The Morgans in April 2020, which featured Jeffrey Dean Morgan of The Walking Dead and his wife Hilarie. The eleventh season of The Walking Dead was delayed due to the pandemic and associated production delays; season 10's originally-intended finale was delayed from April 2020 to October 2020, and the season was extended with additional episodes to air in early-2021.

In May 2020, AMC Studios acquired the rights to Anne Rice's novels The Vampire Chronicles and Lives of the Mayfair Witches, with Rolin Jones named as showrunner for a planned universe of television series based on the novels for AMC. In June 2020, AMC acquired the second season of Gangs of London, replacing Cinemax as its co-production partner. In September 2020 during SDCC@Home, AMC confirmed that The Walking Dead would conclude after an extended, 24-episode season 11, and announced that a Daryl Dixon-centric spin-off starring Norman Reedus and Melissa McBride was in development for a premiere in 2023.

In October 2020, AMC Networks launched a new direct-to-consumer service known as AMC+, which features live, on-demand, and digitial-exclusive content from AMC and its sister networks. Some AMC series would have new episodes premiere exclusively on the service prior to their linear television premiere.

In June 2021, AMC greenlit a series adaptation of the first novel in the Vampire Chronicles series, Interview with the Vampire, as the first production of its "Immortal Universe" franchise. In July 2021, AMC greenlit Dark Winds, a psychological thriller series by Graham Roland adapted from the works of Tony Hillerman, with Zahn McClarnon, George R. R. Martin, and Robert Redford as executive producers among others.

The eleventh and final season of The Walking Dead would premiere in April 2021, with the season divided into three, eight-episode segments, and all episodes (aside from the series finale) premiering on AMC+ a week before their television airing. In July 2022 at San Diego Comic-Con, Scott M. Gimple, Andrew Lincoln and Danai Gurira announced an upcoming Walking Dead miniseries spin-off that would focus on the characters of Rick and Michonne Grimes; the miniseries—which was originally planned as a trilogy of films—would later be titled The Walking Dead: The Ones Who Live.

The October 2022 premiere of Interview with the Vampire—which premiered alongside the second installment of The Walking Dead season 11—generated the largest day of viewership and new subscribers on AMC+ since its launch. In January 2023, AMC premiered Mayfair Witches as its second Immortal Universe series, and acquired the rights to John R. Maxim's Bannerman novel series. In June 2023, AMC premiered The Walking Dead: Dead City, a spin-off and continuation of The Walking Dead following the characters of Maggie and Negan. This was followed in September 2023 by the premiere of The Walking Dead: Daryl Dixon.

In October 2023, AMC acquired the North American rights to Nautilus, a British miniseries originally slated for Disney+. In February 2024, the premiere of The Walking Dead: The Ones Who Live became AMC's highest-rated series premiere since 2018 (The Terror), with approximately three million viewers on television, and being the "most watched episode of any show" on AMC+. In June 2024, AMC renewed Interview with the Vampire for a third season, shifting to the second Vampire Chronicles book The Vampire Lestat. The same month, AMC also ordered a new Silicon Valley-set drama from Jonathan Glatzer directly to series. It also premiered a spin-off of the BBC America co-production Orphan Black, Orphan Black: Echoes. The series was cancelled after one season.

During AMC's upfronts in April 2025, it was announced that the new Glatzer drama would be entitled The Audacity and premiere in April 2026. AMC also announced a new anthology series in development known as Great American Stories, which would also be overseen by Rolin Jones, and feature adaptations of "a celebrated work, historical moment, or individual narrative celebrating and highlighting the American spirit." The first installment announced for the series will be an adaptation of The Grapes of Wrath. The same month, AMC acquired a documentary miniseries on the San Francisco 49ers' Super Bowl dynasty in the 1980s and 1990s, co-produced with Skydance Sports in association with Tom Brady's Religion of Sports and NFL Films. Rise of the 49ers premiered in February 2026, coinciding with Super Bowl LX in San Francisco.

In October 2025, AMC premiered Talamasca: The Secret Order—a spin-off series set within the Immortal Universe. The series was cancelled after one season. In November 2025, it was reported that AMC was fast-tracking development of a NASCAR-themed drama from John Fusco entitled Thunder Road. In December 2025, Total Nonstop Action Wrestling (TNA) announced that its flagship professional wrestling series TNA Impact! would move to AMC and AMC+ beginning January 15, 2026. Also that month, it was reported that AMC was developing a television series adaptation of the 1991 film Point Break.

On March 7, 2026, ahead of its series premiere, AMC renewed The Audacity for a second season. During its upfronts in April 2026, AMC officially ordered Thunder Road, and confirmed development on it, Bannerman, Point Break, and The Grapes of Wrath for planned premieres in 2027.

== Programming ==
=== Series programming ===
Although movies remain an integral part of AMC's schedule, the network has garnered attention in recent years for its original series. The channel's first original series was the game show The Movie Masters, which ran from 1989 to 1990 and was otherwise notable for being Gene Rayburn's last hosting role; outside Remember WENN and Filmfakers, most of AMC's original programming prior to September 2007 consisted of film history-related documentary and review programs. The establishment of Mad Men in 2007, followed by that of Breaking Bad in 2008, and Better Call Saul in 2015, gave AMC a reputation on par with premium cable networks HBO and Showtime (which had both turned down Mad Men), with its original series of the era being considered synonymous with the overall era of "Peak TV". The network has also been known for its adaptations of the comic book franchise The Walking Dead, which launched in 2010.

=== Movie library ===
AMC maintains movie licensing rights agreements with Warner Bros. Entertainment, Amazon MGM Studios (including films from United Artists and library content from The Samuel Goldwyn Company, Orion Pictures, and Cannon Group), Universal Pictures (including some films from DreamWorks Animation as titles from Illumination Entertainment and most from Focus Features are absent), Paramount Pictures (including films from pre-2011 DreamWorks Pictures and Miramax), Walt Disney Studios Motion Pictures (primarily film content from Touchstone Pictures, Hollywood Pictures, 20th Century Studios, Searchlight Pictures, Disney, Walt Disney Animation Studios, and Buena Vista International, while titles from Pixar, Lucasfilm, much of Marvel Studios, and the defunct Blue Sky Studios are not included because of other channels' agreements, including those owned by Disney themselves) and Sony Pictures Entertainment (including Columbia Pictures, TriStar Pictures, Sony Pictures Classics, Screen Gems, and Triumph Films). Since the 2002 format change, the network's film telecasts usually are "television" cuts meant for basic cable, which feature content edits, censoring or dubbing of profanities, and some time edits by removing some superfluous plotting or toning down scenes with adult content inappropriate for basic cable broadcast to fit within a set timeslot with commercials added.

==== FearFest ====
In 1997, AMC launched "Monsterfest", a popular week-long marathon of horror films and thrillers that aired from mid- or late October every year for Halloween until the day after Halloween. In the mid-2000s, AMC started a Monsterfest blog on its website, which chronicled news on horror-related film and television productions. In addition, AMC presented "Fear Friday", a horror movie double feature on late Friday evenings. On September 26, 2008, AMC announced the launch of a new horror-themed movie marathon for its October schedule called "Fearfest" (which replaced Monsterfest); coinciding with this, the "Monsterfest" blog was renamed as the "Horror Hacker" blog. "Fearfest" also ran from mid- or late October every year for Halloween until the day after Halloween too from 2008 to 2021. Beginning in 2021, Fearfest now runs throughout the whole month of October.

==== Best Christmas Ever ====
AMC had typically aired a rotating lineup of five to six Christmas movies during the holiday season. In 2018, the channel introduced a more extensive holiday lineup branded as Best Christmas Ever, running from November 26 to December 25, featuring a mix of popular Christmas and family films, along with other acquired specials. The schedule included notable acquisitions from Warner Bros., including Elf, National Lampoon's Christmas Vacation, The Polar Express, and 12 Rankin/Bass Animated Entertainment specials (the films had been recent mainstays of Freeform's competing 25 Days of Christmas schedule, with Elf in particular having received extensive airplay and high viewership during the event), as well as other specials from DreamWorks Animation. As expected, AMC saw ratings gains over the holiday season; primetime viewership for the first two weeks of the event was up 40% year-over-year, airings of Elf and Christmas Vacation both peaked at 1.5 million viewers, and average viewership of feature films on Freeform fell by 36% year-over-year in the same period.

=== AMC Premiere ===
AMC Premiere is an add-on subscription service only available as an extra to those already normally subscribed to AMC. It involves access to an expanded On-Demand library compared to the standard "AMC OnDemand" library packaged with the usual cable service. This is necessary to view many "locked" programs on the AMC website (such as complete availability to The Walking Dead all eleven seasons) which prompts someone to subscribe for ~$5/mo or ~$30/yr. For currently-airing programs it sometimes gives early access to viewing them before they debut on the main AMC channel.

=== AMC+ ===
AMC+ is a video on demand streaming service that has content from AMC Premiere, priority access to AMC programs, library shows from BBC America, IFC, and Sundance TV, and also has shows from AMC Networks services such as Shudder, Sundance Now, and IFC Films Unlimited. The AMC+ is available via direct distribution and also as an add on subscription on digital platforms such as Apple TV, Amazon Prime Video, and Roku. It is also available on pay television providers like Xfinity, Dish Network, and Sling TV.

== International availability ==
=== Canada ===
On September 1, 2006, AMC officially became available in Canada for cable customers of Shaw Cable and satellite customers of Shaw Direct (formerly StarChoice), marking the first time AMC was made available outside the United States. The channel is also available through Rogers Cable, Bell Fibe TV, Cogeco, and Eastlink.

The Canadian feed of AMC is identical to the American feed although some of its programming, such as TNA Impact!, is blacked out due to Sportsnet holding the rights to the program in Canada and its replaced with alternate programming lineup.

=== Europe ===
In October 2013, AMC Networks acquired the European media company Chellomedia from Liberty Global, renaming it AMC Networks International. In November 2014, the European MGM Channel was relaunched as a pan-European version of AMC.
