= Bruno Wolkowitch =

French actor

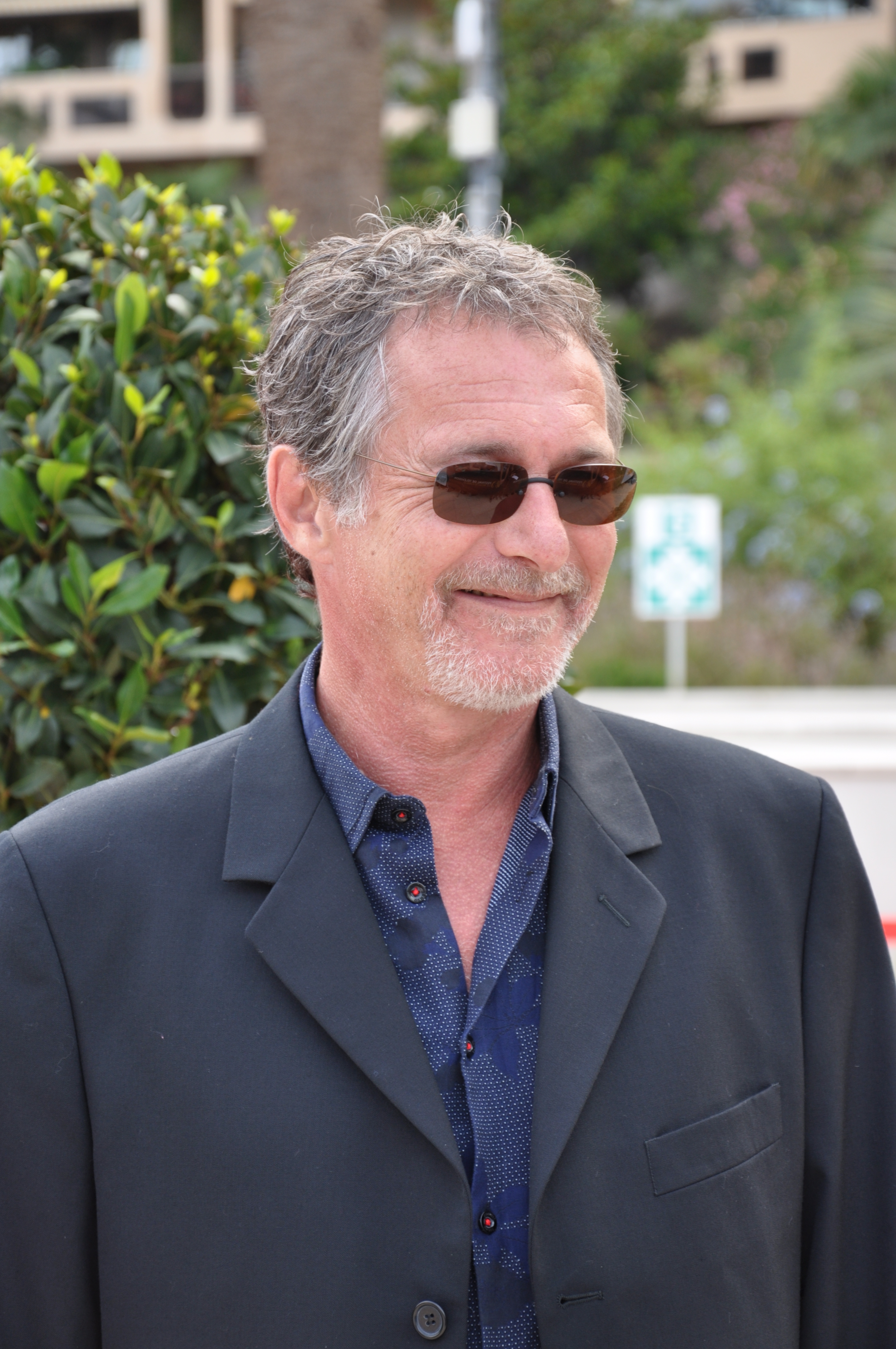
- Bruno Wolkowitch in 2015 at the Monte-Carlo Television Festival.
- Born: Bruno Jacques Wolkowitch; Paris, France
- Occupation: Actor
- Notable work: Famille de cœur; Le Frangin d'Amérique; Lagardère
- Television: PJ; Méditerranée; Spin
- Website: www.brunowolkowitch.com

Bruno Wolkowitch is a French actor.

== Early life and education ==
Bruno Wolkowitch (orig. Wołkowicz) is of Polish descent. His father was a tailor turned bookkeeper, and his mother a beautician who became a dermatology assistant. He spent his childhood in Champigny-sur-Marne and then his adolescence in Saint-Maur-des-Fossés (Val-de-Marne).

He trained as an actor from 1981 to 1984 at Studio 34 with Claude Mathieu. In 1984, he was awarded a Diploma of Drama at the Conservatoire national supérieur d'art dramatique in Paris. From 1984 to 1987, he studied with Viviane Theophilides, Michel Bouquet, and Jean-Pierre Vincent. At the same time, he entered the Comédie-Française.

== Career ==
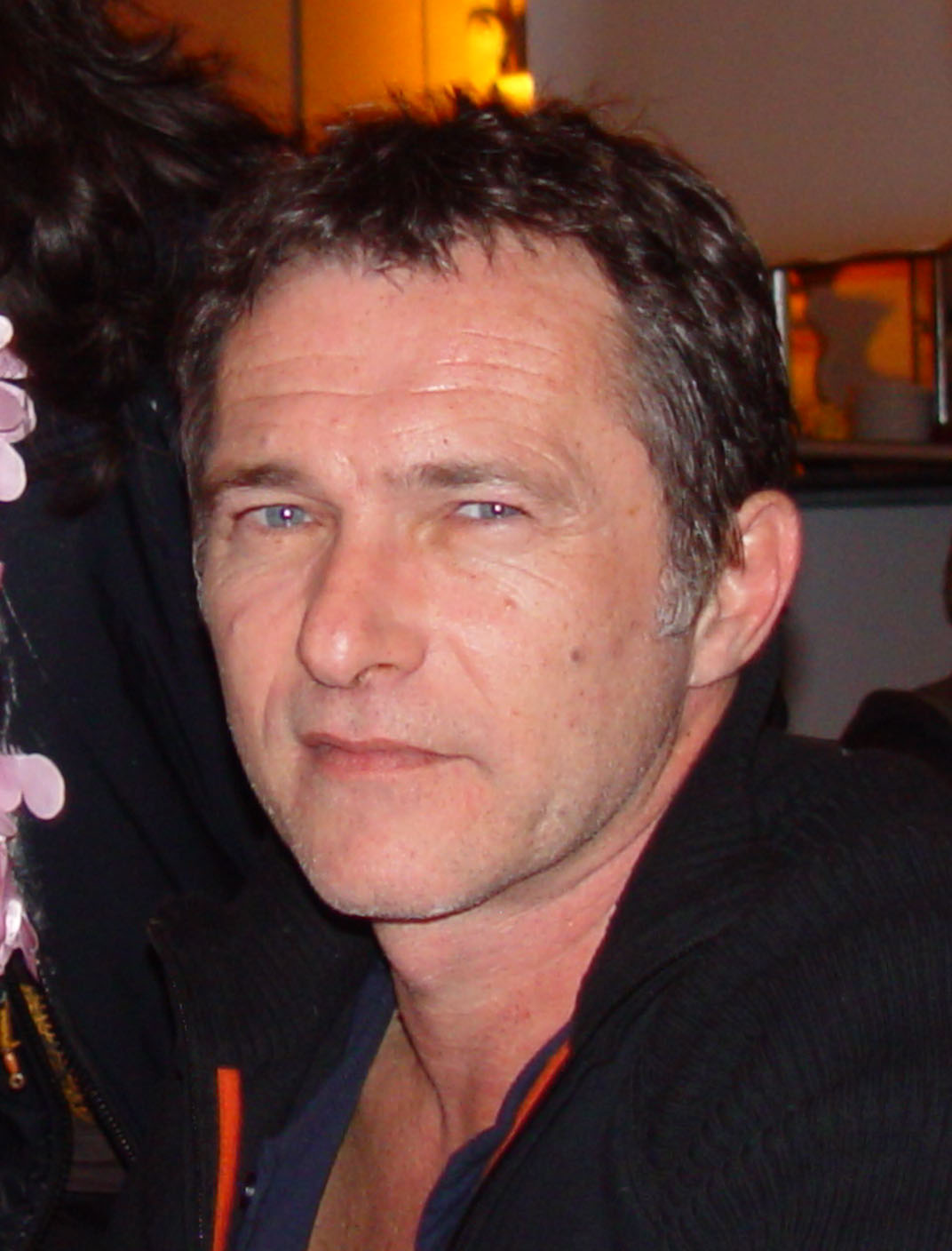
Bruno Wolkowitch in 2007 in Namur.

Wolkowitch then appeared in numerous television films and gained notice with the television series Madame le maire in 1997 and PJ (Police judiciaire). In the latter series, Wolkowitch played Captain/Commander Vincent Fournier. He appeared in the first 100 episodes, from 1997 to March 2006 on France 2. Wolkowitch appeared in flashbacks for several seasons more. In addition to his role as a field policeman, a pillar of the police station at PJ Saint-Martin, he continues to play other characters, notably that of Lagardère in a two-part television film of that name, aired in 2003.

He has also performed on stage. In 2006, he starred in Miss Julie, by August Strindberg, with Christine Citti – who played in the first two seasons of PJ – and Émilie Dequenne.

== Personal life ==
Wolkowitch is also passionate about photography.

In October 2015, on France Inter radio station, the actor acknowledged having spent a very short stay in prison in Israel at the age of seventeen, to protect a friend on a narcotics-related charge. Since then, he has been barred from entering Israel.

== Filmography ==
=== Acting ===
==== Films ====
Year	Title	Role	Director	Notes
1983	For Those I Loved	Jurek	Robert Enrico	Credited in the credits under the name of "Bruno Volko"
1984	Hell Train		Roger Hanin	
1987	Keep Your Right Up		Jean-Luc Godard	
1988	L'enfance de l'art		Francis Girod	
1989	Vent de Galerne		Bernard Favre	
1993	Mauvais garçon		Jacques Bral	
1994	Joan the Maiden		Jacques Rivette	
1994	L'Affaire		Sergio Gobbi	
1995	L'Uomo proiettile (L'Homme canon)		Silvano Agosti	
1997	La Chica		Bruno Gantillon	
1998	Terminale	Terrien	Francis Girod	
2004	Le Grand Rôle		Steve Suissa	Voice off
2010	The Tourist	French police commissioner	Florian Henckel von Donnersmarck	
2012	Love Is Not Perfect		Francesca Muci	
2013	Chez nous c'est trois!		Claude Duty	
2013	A Five Star Life		Maria Sole Tognazzi	
2016	La folle histoire de Max et Léon		Jonathan Barré, Palmashow	
2018	Treat Me Like Fire	Ivo	Marie Monge	

==== Television ====
Years	Title	Role	Creator	Notes
1985	Madame le maire		Jean-François Claire	
1987	Mort aux ténors	Ivan	Serge Moati	In the series Série noire
1987	Mont royal		Mario Philip Azzopardi	
1989	Les Cinq Dernières Minutes			"The Cherubim are Not Angels"; directed by Jean-Pierre Desagnat
1989	Les Enquêtes du commissaire Maigret			"The Auberge aux noyés"; directed by Jean-Paul Sassy
1989	Quand le diable ricane		Armand Wahnoun	
1989	Les Jupons de la Révolution: Madame Tallien		Didier Grousset	
1990	Le Vagabond des mers		José Varela	
1990	Force de frappe: Voie sans issue		Paolo Barzman	
1992	Maigret			"Maigret and the Judge's House"; directed by Bertrand Van Effenterre
1994	Deux Millions de dollars dans un fauteuil		Yves Amoureux	
1994	Meurtres par procuration		Claude-Michel Rome	
1994	Mayday		Jean-Louis Daniel	
1995	Passion mortelle		Claude-Michel Rome	
1996	Dans un grand vent de fleurs	Guillaume Garlande	Gérard Vergez	
1997	Pour mon fils		Michaëla Watteaux	
1997–2005	PJ	Vincent Fournier		
1997	Jamais sans toi		Daniel Janneau	
1997	Vérité oblige	Prison director		"My Daughter... This Unknown"; directed by Claude-Michel Rome
1998	Famille de cœur		Gérard Vergez	
1998	Doppio Segreto		Marcello Cesena	
1999	Marie et Tom		Dominique Baron	
1999	Mieux vaut tard que jamais		Luca Manfredi	
2000	Les Cordier, juge et flic	Marc Singer		"Portrait with Scalpel"
2000	Remise de peine		Alberto Simone	
2001	Méditerranée		Henri Helman	
2001	Le Gave		Christian Bonnet	
2001	La Faux		Jean-Dominique de La Rochefoucauld	
2002	Garonne		Claude d'Anna	
2002	La Parité		Gérard Vergez	
2002	Trop plein d'amour		Steve Suissa	
2003	Qu'elle est belle la quarantaine!		Alexis Lecaye	
2003	Lagardère	Henri de Lagardère / Le Bossu	Henry Helman	
2004	Le Frangin d'Amérique		Jacques Fansten	
2005	Je t'aime à te tuer		Alain Wermus	
2005	Retrouver Sara		Claude d'Anna	
2007	Rock'n Roll Circus		Alain Robillard	
2008	Sagan	Philippe	Diane Kurys	
2008	Hold-up à l'italienne		Claude-Michel Rome	
2008	Grands reporters		Gilles de Maistre	
2009	PJ	Vincent Fournier		
2009–10	Les Toqués	Monsieur B		"The Gold Rush", "The Trojan Horse"
2010	Le Désamour		Daniel Janneau	
2011	Coup de chaleur		Christophe Barraud	
2011	La République des enfants	Garcin	Jacques Fansten	
2012–16	Spin	Simon Kapita	Frédéric Tellier, Jean-Marc Brondolo	
2012	Ragazze sul web		Marco Pontecorvo	
2013	Rouge Brésil		Sylvain Archambault	
2013	Pourquoi personne me croit?		Jacques Fansten	
2013	Cherif			"False Pretenses"; directed by Vincent Giovanni
2013	À corde tendue		Pierre-Antoine Hiroz	
2015	Accusé			"The Story of Simon"; directed by Didier Bivel
2015	Un père coupable		Caroline Huppert	
2015	Meurtres à Carcassonne		Julien Despaux	
2015	Borderline		Olivier Marchal	
2016	Mongeville			"Living Legend"; directed by René Manzor
2016	Caïn			Season 4, "The Prisoners"; by Christophe Douchand
2017	Cassandre			Episode 5 "Backfire"; by Hervé Renoh
2017	La Loi de Valérie		Thierry Binisti	
2020	Baby	Christophe		Episode 3x01, 3x02

==== Short films ====
Year	Title	Director
1988	Un coin de table	Josiane Maisse
1993	Qui est-ce qui a éteint la lumière?	Xavier Auradon
1994	Parlez après le signal sonore	Olivier Jahan
1997	Amour néanmoins	Frédéric Darie

=== Dubbing ===
Year	Title	Director	Role	Actor
1993	Romeo Is Bleeding	Peter Medak	Jack Grimaldi	Gary Oldman
1995	The Usual Suspects	Bryan Singer	Michael McManus	Stephen Baldwin
1995	The Crossing Guard	Sean Penn	John Booth	David Morse
1996	Sleepers	Barry Levinson	Sean Nokes	Kevin Bacon

=== Directorial works ===
Year	Title	Creator	Co-director	Location
1992	Ordinaire et Disgracié	Claude Mollet	Hervé Pierre	Théâtre de la Ville

=== Music videos ===
Year	Song	Artist	Director
1996	Babe	Viktor Lazlo	Philippe Gautier

== Theatre ==
Year	Title	Creator	Director	Location	Notes
	Autopsie	Pascal Cantelle			
	L'Épreuve	Éric Tallien			
1984	Parking du ciel	Emmanuel Weisz		Munich	
1985	The Balcony	Jean Genet	Georges Lavaudant	Comédie-Française	
1986	Macbeth	William Shakespeare	Jean-Pierre Vincent	Comédie-Française	
1986	The Tempest	William Shakespeare	Alfredo Arias	Festival d'Avignon Théâtre de la Commune	
1987	Polyeucte	Pierre Corneille	Jorge Lavelli	Comédie-Française	
1988	The Changeling	Thomas Middleton, William Rowley	Stuart Seide	Théâtre de Gennevilliers	
1988	King Lear	William Shakespeare	Jacques Kraemer	Théâtre de Boulogne-Billancourt	
1988	Le Martyre de Saint Sébastien	Gabriele D'Annunzio, Claude Debussy	Jean-Pierre Vincent, Jean-Paul Chambas	Villa Medici Rome	
1989	The Moods of Marianne	Alfred de Musset	France Rousselle	Théâtre du Gymnase Marseille	
1993	Le Mal court	Jacques Audiberti	Pierre Franck	Théâtre de l'Atelier	
1993	Cat on a Hot Tin Roof	Tennessee Williams	Michel Fagadau	Théâtre Marigny	
2005	Derniers Remords avant l'oubli	Jean-Luc Lagarce	Jean-Pierre Vincent	CDDB-Théâtre de Lorient, La Criée	As Pierre
2006	Miss Julie	August Strindberg	Didier Long	Théâtre Marigny	As Jean, the valet
2007	It's Only the End of the World	Jean-Luc Lagarce	François Berreur	MC2, Nouveau théâtre de Besançon, Maison de la Culture de Bourges, Théâtre de la Cité internationale, Théâtre des Célestins, Théâtre de la Manufacture	Tour
2008	It's Only the End of the World	Jean-Luc Lagarce	François Berreur	TNBA	Tour
2008	Equus	Peter Shaffer	Didier Long	Théâtre Marigny	
2010	Le Donneur de bain	Dorine Hollier	Dan Jemmett	Théâtre Marigny	
2011	Pluie d’enfer	Keith Huff	Benoît Lavigne	Pépinière Théâtre	
2014	Le Secret de Poussinette		Bruno Wolkowitch	Comédie Saint-Michel	
2015	Danser à Lughnasa	Brian Friel	Didier Long	Théâtre de l'Atelier	
