= The Chalet (TV series) =

2018 French television series

- French: Le Chalet
- Genre: Crime; Thriller; Slasher
- Created by: Alexis Lecaye; Camille Bordes-Resnais
- Starring: Nicolas Gob; Chloé Lambert; Marc Ruchmann; Pierre-Benoist Varoclier; Thierry Godard; Éric Savin
- Composer: Samuel Hercule
- Country of origin: France
- No. of seasons: 1
- No. of episodes: 6

Production
- Producer: Alexis Lecaye
- Running time: 50 minutes
- Production companies: Djama; France Télévisions; TV5 Monde

Original release
- Network: France 2
- Release: 18 March – 9 April 2018

The Chalet (French: Le Chalet) is a six-episode French television series, created by Alexis Lecaye and directed by Camille Bordes-Resnais, which premiered on 26 March 2018 on France 2. The series was distributed internationally by Netflix between 2018 and 2022.

== Synopsis ==
The plot alternates between two separate timelines set twenty years apart.

=== 1997 timeline ===
Jean-Louis Rodier, a Parisian writer suffering from writer's block, decides to move with his family to his wife Françoise's hometown Valmoline: a small village in the Alps. He rents a chalet owned by Philippe and Florence Personnaz, who are also the owners of the only bar in town. The family's transition into their new life is complicated by the insular nature of the village, and by Jean-Louis's lack of progress on his second novel. Due to his feelings of inadequacy, Jean-Louis alienates his wife and seeks solace by befriending Philippe's sister Muriel, the local barkeep. Jean-Louis sees Muriel's provincial life as possible setting for his future novel.

At the same time, Julien, Jean-Louis and Françoise's son, befriends Alice Bordaz, the local carpenter's daughter. This is met with open hostility by the other boys in the village, particularly by Sébastien Genesta, who has unrequited feelings for Alice.

Then suddenly the Rodiers are gone, without any explanation.

=== 2017 timeline ===
Manu Laverne, who spent his summers in Valmoline as a child, arrives at the newly renovated chalet with Adele, who is two months pregnant. They have returned for the wedding of Tiphaine and Laurent, son of Philippe who still lives in the village and owns the chalet.

The wedding party arrives at the nearby train station and travels towards the chalet. After they cross the bridge that serves as the only access to Valmoline, there is a rockslide which completely cuts the group off from the outside world. They soon discover that the phone and Internet connection have also stopped working.

Isolated with the last six members of the village, secrets emerge from the past and a terrible revenge starts to unfold.

== Cast ==
- Chloé Lambert as Muriel Personnaz
- Philippe Dusseau as Philippe Personnaz
- Marc Ruchmann as Manu Laverne (adult)
- Samantha Markowic as Florence Personnaz
- Éric Savin as Étienne Genesta
- Blanche Veisberg as Christine Genesta
- Thierry Godard as Alexandre Gossange
- Nade Dieu as Mathilde Reynard
- Pierre-Benoist Varoclier as Olivier Salvet
- Manuel Blanc as Jean-Louis Rodier
- Mia Delmaë as Françoise Rodier
- Pasquale d'Inca as Milou Bordaz
- Nicolas Gob as Sébastien Genesta (adult)
- Max Libert as Sébastien Genesta (child)
- Agnès Delachair as Alice Bordaz (adult)
- Louvia Bachelier as Alice Bordaz (child)
- Émilie de Preissac as Adèle
- Félix Lefèbvre as Julien Rodier
- Laura Meunier as Amélie Rodier
- Maud Jurez as Maud Dautremer
- Arthur Dujardin as Thierry Personnaz (child)
- Eliott Lobrot as Laurent Personnaz (child)
- Charles Petit as Laurent Personnaz (adult)
- Catherine Vinatier as Doctor Ségur, expert psychiatric
- Jean-Toussaint Bernard as Thierry Personnaz (adult)
- Fleur Geffrier as Erika Personnaz
- Fleur Lise Heuet as Tiphaine
- Mathieu Simonet as Fabio Romani

== Production ==
=== Filming locations ===
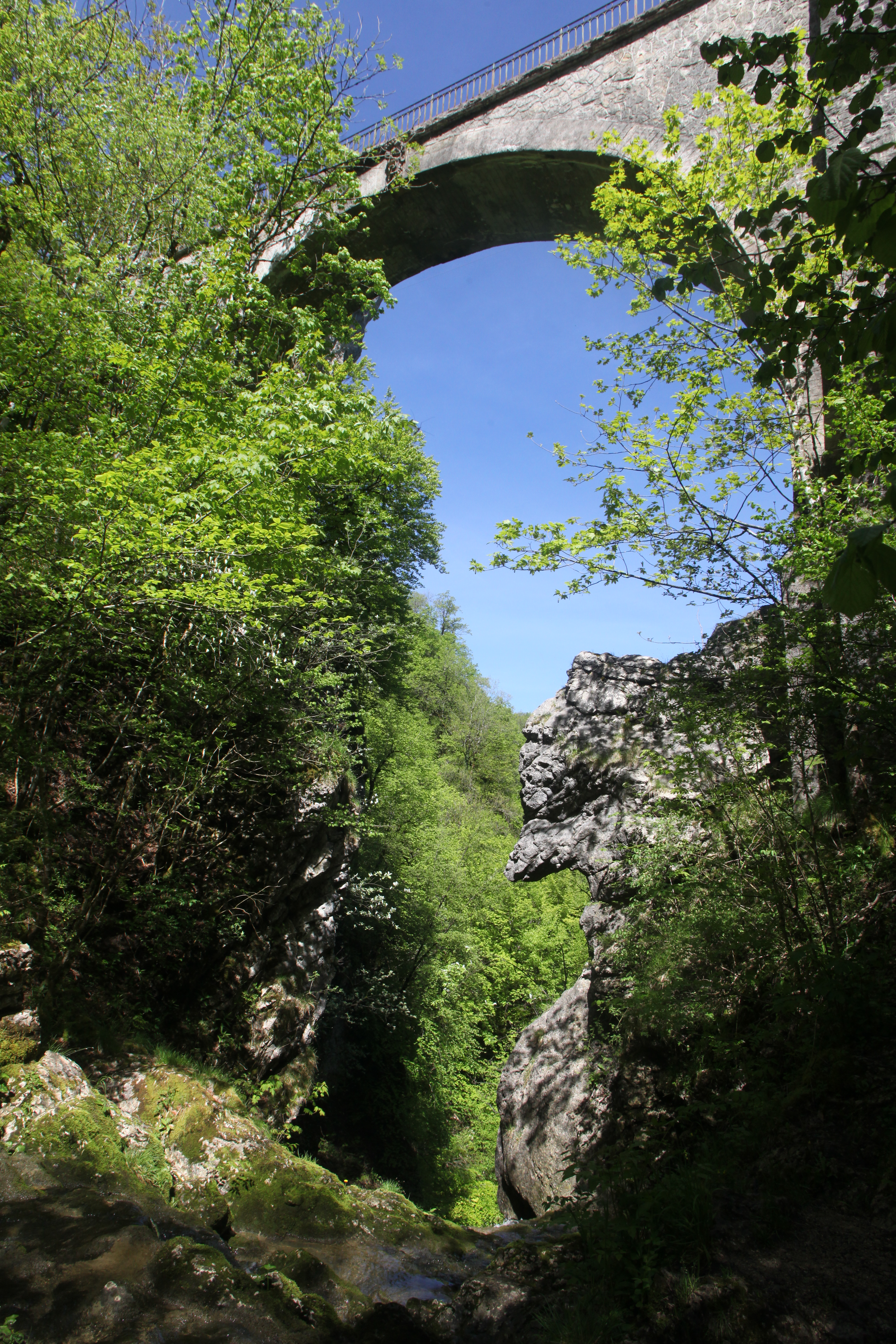
Pont du Diable

Filming took place during the summer of 2016, at Chamonix, where the chalet is located and also at Bozel, and the hamlets of the Tincave, La Chenal and at Morez Station. The bridge that collapses partially in the series is the Pont du Diable, which connects Crouzet-Migette and Sainte Anne. These distant places made the production of the series complex.

=== Preview ===
The duo Camille Bordes-Resnais and Alexis Lecaye already made Les Dames. They presented the first two episodes at the La Rochelle TV Fiction Festival, but these were judged to be too confusing by professionals. The broadcast network, France 2, therefore requested changes to the script.

=== Dedication ===
The series is dedicated to Blanche Veisberg (Christine Genesta), who died in December 2017.
