= Jean-Marc Brondolo =

French screenwriter

- Occupations: Screenwriter, director
- Years active: 1990–present

Jean-Marc Brondolo is a French screenwriter and director.

== Theater ==
Year	Title	Author
1990	La Vie à Deux	Jean-Marc Brondolo
1992	Feu la mère de Madame	Georges Feydeau

== Filmography ==
Year	Title	Role	Notes
1995	Ada sait pas dire non	Assistant director	Short directed by Luc Pagès
1996	Les frères Gravet	Assistant director	Directed by René Féret
1997	Rien que des grandes personnes	Director & writer	Short
1999	Tête à Tête	Director & writer	Short
2000	Faites comme si je n'étais pas là	Assistant director	Directed by Olivier Jahan
2002	De la tête aux pieds	Assistant director	Short directed by Pascal Lahmani
2002	Les oreilles sur le dos	Assistant director	TV movie directed by Xavier Durringer
2003	Après la pluie, le beau temps	Assistant director	Directed by Nathalie Schmidt
2004	Capone	Director & writer	TV movie Biarritz International Festival of Audiovisual Programming - Michel Mitrani Award; Nominated - Annonay International Festival of First Films - Grand Jury Prize
2006	Aller simple	Director & writer	TV movie
2008	Scalp	Director	TV series (4 episodes)
2009	Reporters	Director	TV series (5 episodes)
2010–2012	Spiral	Director	TV series (12 episodes)
2010–2013	Un village français	Director	TV series (12 episodes)
2014	Spin	Director	TV series (6 episodes)
2016	Le choix de Cheyenne	Director	TV movie Luchon International Film Festival - Special Mention of the Jury for the Director
2018	Les impatientes	Director	TV mini-series
