= Thierry Godard =

French actor (born 1967)

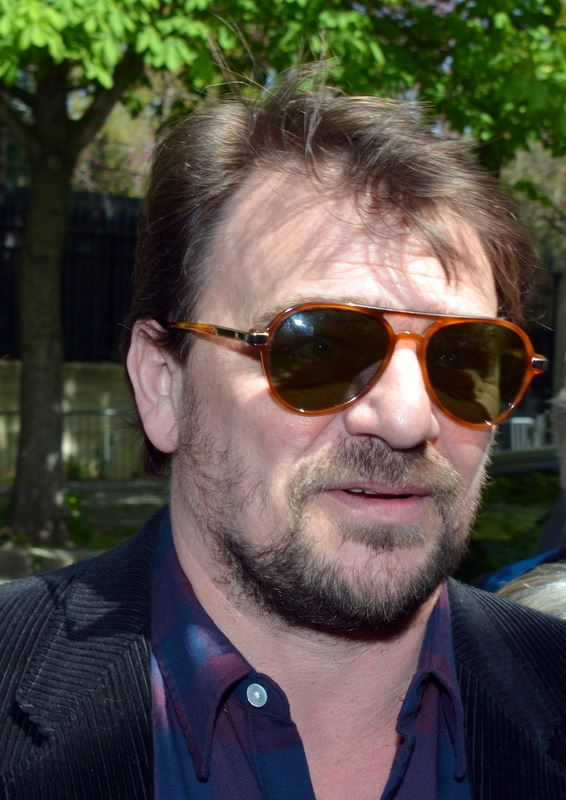
- Born: 8 February 1967 (age 59); Issy-les-Moulineaux, France
- Occupation: Actor
- Years active: 1999–present
- Height: 1.77 m (5 ft 10 in)
- Spouse: Sophie Guillemin (m. 2018)
- Children: 1

Thierry Godard (born 8 February 1967) is a French actor. He has appeared in more than fifty films since 2001.

== Early life and education ==
Godard was born on 8 February 1967 in Issy-les-Moulineaux, France.

After finishing school, he earned a cabinetmaking diploma before turning to theater. Godard trained at the Studio Pygmalion in Paris, where he participated in workshops taught by Robert Cordier.

== Career ==
Godard took his first steps as an actor on television in 1999 in the series Lawyers and Associates, appearing as the journalist, then in L'Enfant éternel in 2002. Three years later, he became known to the general public thanks to his role of Lieutenant "Gilou" in the series Engrenages (Spiral) then through the series Un village français where, from 2009–17, he played the character of Raymond Schwartz.

He starred alongside Noémie Schmidt in the 2020 telemovie Copy Cat (Faux-semblants), an award-winning film directed by Akim Isker.

He plays the role of Lezine in the second season of the Star Wars TV series Andor released in Spring 2025.

== Personal life ==
The actor has a son from his relationship with Sandrine Degraef. In 2017, his companion Blanche Veisberg died suddenly from cancer. The same year, on the shooting of the TV movie Remember us, he met the actress Sophie Guillemin. The couple were married in August 2018.

== Filmography ==
=== Film ===
Year	Title	Author	Director
2004	Initial DJ	Jean-Marc Lanteri	Ludovic Nobileau
2005	Où boivent les vaches	Roland Dubillard	Éric Vigner
2006	La Pluie d'été	Marguerite Duras	Éric Vigner (2)
2012	Miss Julie	August Strindberg	Robin Renucci
2016	Encore une histoire d'amour	Tom Kempinski	Ladislas Chollat

=== Television ===
Year	Title	Role	Director	Notes
1999	Avocats & associés	The Journalist	Philippe Triboit	TV series (1 episode)
2001	Le Vélo de Ghislain Lambert	A Doctor	Philippe Harel	
2002	A+ Pollux	An Intruder	Luc Pagès	
2002	Ces jours heureux	M. Damarso	Éric Toledano and Olivier Nakache	Short
2002	Sophie s'enflamme		Christophe Leraie	Short
2002	L'enfant éternel	Delaunay's Guard	Patrick Poubel	TV movie
2004	Le rêve		Robert Benitah	Short
2005	La vie de Michel Muller est plus belle que la vôtre	Titi	Michel Muller	
2005	Je préfère qu'on reste amis	Mathias	Éric Toledano and Olivier Nakache (2)	
2005	Julie Lescaut	The SAMU Doctor	Bernard Uzan	TV series (1 episode)
2005	P.J.	M. Ravalon	Gérard Vergez	TV series (1 episode)
2005	Avocats & associés	Didier Masson	Patrice Martineau	TV series (1 episode)
2005	Inséparables	The Bar Owner	Élisabeth Rappeneau	TV series (1 episode)
2005–present	Spiral	Lieutenant Gilles Escoffier, known as "Gilou"	Jean-Marc Brondolo, Manuel Boursinhac, ...	TV series (53 episodes)
2006	L'école pour tous	The Night Cop	Éric Rochant	
2006	Mer belle à agitée	Jeannot	Pascal Chaumeil	TV movie
2006	L'État de Grace	Cyril Tesson	Pascal Chaumeil (2)	TV series
2006	La crim'	Mainguy	Eric Woreth	TV series (2 episodes)
2007	Périphérique blues	A Rapist	Slony Sow	Short
2007	Un jour d'été	The Coach	Franck Guérin	TV movie
2007	Opération Turquoise	Lieutenant-colonel Harrèche	Alain Tasma	TV movie
2007	Tous les hommes sont des romans	Renaud	Renan Pollès & Alain Riou	TV movie
2007	L'embrasement	Alex Martens	Philippe Triboit (2)	TV movie
2007	Le réveillon des bonnes	Auguste Verdier	Michel Hassan	TV series
2007	Élodie Bradford	Jean-Louis Cazenave	Olivier Guignard	TV series (1 episode)
2007	Hénaut président		Bruno Le Jean & Michel Muller (2)	TV series (1 episode)
2008	Anything for Her	Pascal Aucler	Fred Cavayé	
2008	La dame de Monsoreau	Henry IV	Michel Hassan (2)	TV movie
2008	Adresse inconnue	Patrick Balage	Rodolphe Tissot	TV series (1 episode)
2009	Welcome	Bruno	Philippe Lioret	
2009	In the Beginning	Michel	Xavier Giannoli	
2009	Fausses innocences	Roger Muller	André Chandelle	TV movie
2009-2017	Un village français	Raymond Schwartz	Jean-Philippe Amar, Philippe Triboit (3), ...	TV series (61 episodes)
2010	Top Floor, Left Wing	Commandant Villard	Angelo Cianci	
2010	Orpailleur	Lavergne	Marc Barrat	
2010	Femme de personne	The Lover	Constance Dollé	Short
2010	Boucherie	The Man	Sandy Seneschal	Short
2010	Les Bougon	Jésus	Sam Karmann	TV series (1 episode)
2010-2015	Les Dames	Martin	Camille Bordes-Resnais, Alexis Lecaye, ...	TV series (9 episodes)
2011	La Ligne droite	Jacques	Régis Wargnier	
2011	Propriété interdite	Jo	Hélène Angel	
2011	La nuit du réveillon	Paul Violet	Serge Meynard	TV movie
2012	Si tu veux revoir ta mère	Francis	Xavier Douin	Short
2012	La disparition	Bruno Gaillon	Jean-Xavier de Lestrade	TV movie
2012	Valparaiso	Greg van Kalck	Jean-Christophe Delpias	TV movie
2012	L'homme de ses rêves	David	Christophe Douchand	TV movie
2012	Le cerveau d'Hugo	The Psychiatrist	Sophie Révil	TV movie
2013	Les limites	Luka	Laura Presgurvic	Short
2013	Les complices	Marc Billard	Christian Vincent	TV movie
2014	Palace Beach Hotel	Colonel Letelier	Philippe Venault	TV movie
2015	Une mère en trop	Eric Revard	Thierry Petit	TV movie
2016	Bastille Day	Rafi Bertrand	James Watkins	
2016	Juillet août	Franck	Diastème	
2016	Un, Deux, Trois...	Luciano	Lou Cheruy Zidi	Short
2016	Le premier coup		Caroline Proust & Etienne Saldés	Short
2016	Accusé	Jean	Mona Achache	TV series (1 episode)
2016	Ma pire angoisse	Patrick	Vladimir Rodionov	TV series (1 episode)
2016	Caïn	Etienne Courcelles	Christophe Douchand (2)	TV series (1 episode)
2017	Le Poids Des Mensonges	Mathieu Ricoeur	Serge Meynard (2)	TV movie
2017	Murders at Sarlat	Eric Pavin	Delphine Lemoine	TV series (1 episode)
2018	Les impatientes	Dominique Ténier	Jean-Marc Brondolo (2)	TV series
2018	Le Chalet	Alexandre Gossange	Camille Bordes-Resnais	TV series
2023	Dark Hearts	Colonel Roques	Ziad Doueiri	TV series
2025	Andor	Lezine	Tony Gilroy	TV series (4 episodes)
