= Grégory Fitoussi =

French actor

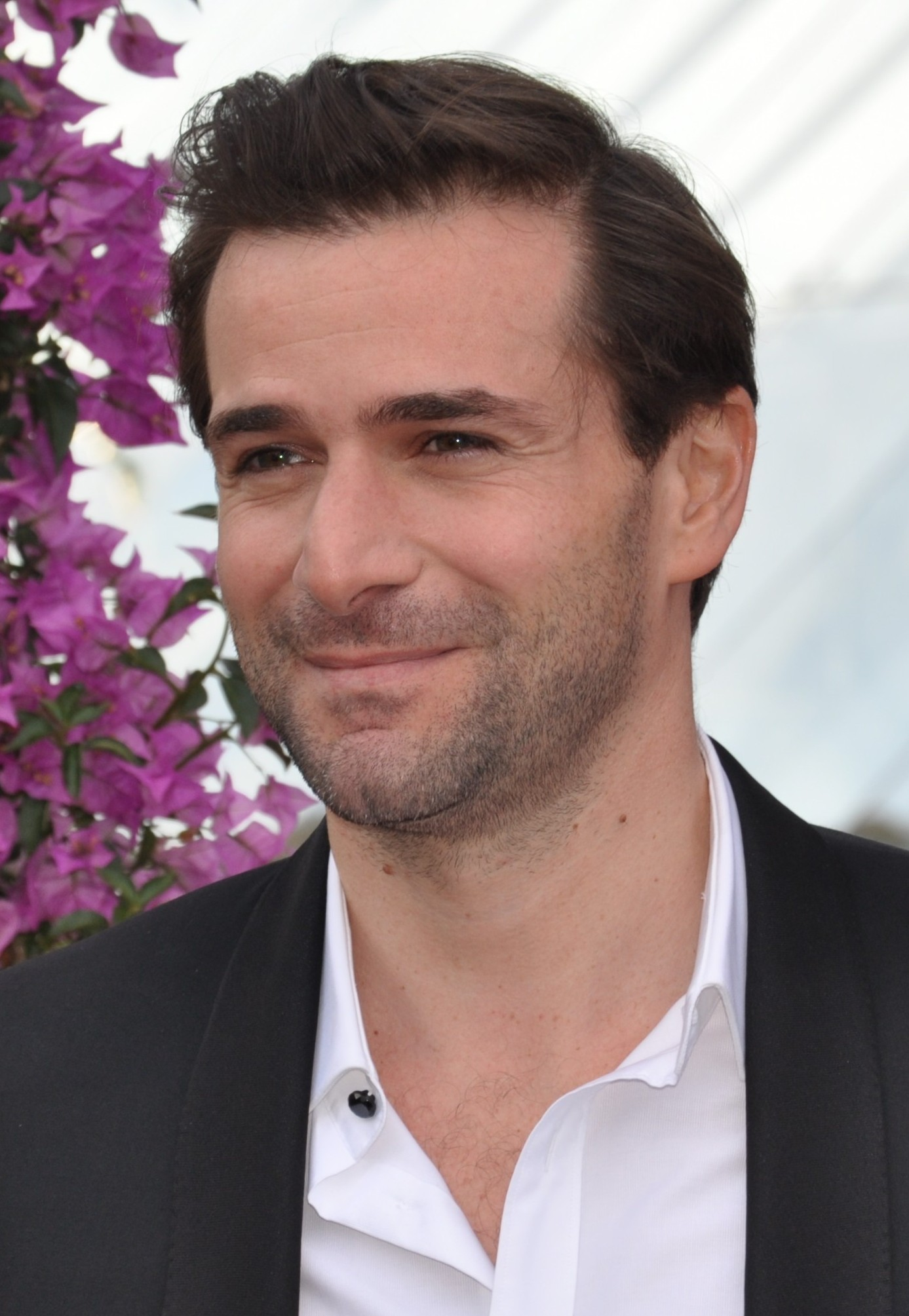
- Grégory Fitoussi at the Monte-Carlo Television Festival in 2013
- Born: 13 August 1976 (age 48); Paris, France
- Occupation: Actor

Grégory Fitoussi (born 13 August 1976) is a French actor. Born and raised in Paris, he rose to prominence playing Benjamin Losey in the French soap opera Sous le soleil (1998-2001). After departing the show, he had a prominent role in the police procedural and legal drama series Spiral (2005-2014), playing Pierre Clément, a young prosecutor. His other prominent television roles have included Spin (2012-2016), Mr Selfridge (2012-2015) and Peaky Blinders (2022).

== Early life ==
He was born in 1976 in Paris to Pied-Noir Sephardi Jewish parents. His parents opened a clothing store in Paris managed by his mother, while his father designed the displays. At the age of 20 he abandoned his university studies in cultural mediation to pursue acting and taking classes with Jack Waltzer of the Actors Studio.

He appears alongside his brother, Mikaël Fitoussi, in the short film Alliés Nés, roughly based on his own family.

== Career ==
Fitoussi appeared in the TF1 television soap Sous le soleil in which he played Benjamin, the husband of the character Laure Olivier. He also appeared in L'État de Grace, a television series broadcast on France 2, in which he played the gynaecologist of Grace, the president of France. Later, he played Maître Vidal, the lawyer of Marie Besnard (played by Muriel Robin), in the French docudrama The Poisoner (Marie Besnard, l'empoisonneuse).

Fitoussi had one of the lead roles in seasons 1-5 of French police procedural drama Engrenages, known in English as Spiral, where he played prosecutor/advocate Pierre Clément alongside Caroline Proust as Chief Inspector Laure Berthaud.

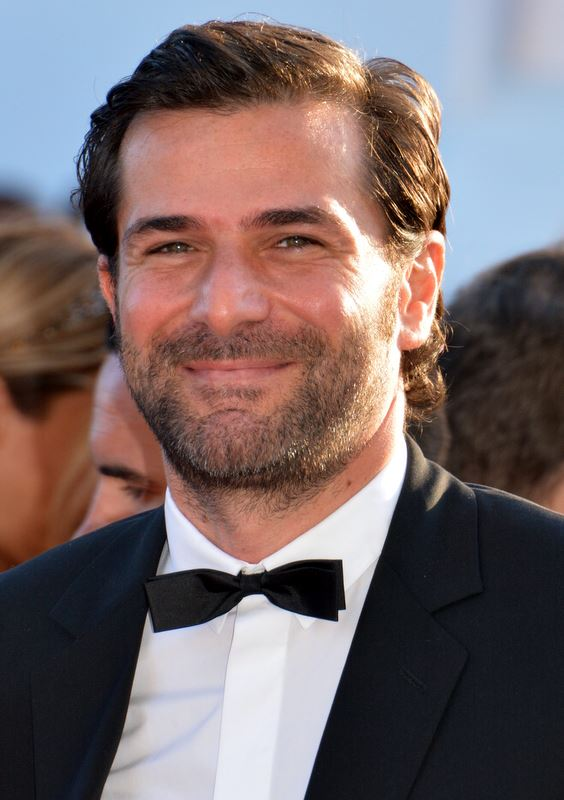
Fitoussi at the 2016 Cannes Film Festival

From 2012 to 2016, Fitoussi played spin doctor Ludovic Desmeuze in France 2's political thriller Les Hommes de l'ombre (Spin in English-speaking countries). The series was broadcast internationally, including by Channel 4 in the United Kingdom. It was also broadcast internationally on the TV5Monde channels.

Between 2013 and 2015, Fitoussi appeared as Henri Leclair in 24 episodes of ITV's Mr Selfridge. He has followed up the role with a number of roles in English-language productions. In 2015, he appeared as Luc Girard in the NBC drama series American Odyssey. Later, in 2018, joined the cast of the second season of Sky Atlantic's Riviera. In 2022, he joined the sixth season of Netflix period crime drama, Peaky Blinders.

== Personal life ==
He lives in Saint-Mandé, a high-end commune in the eastern suburbs of Paris.

== Filmography ==
=== Film ===
Year	Title	Role	Director	Notes
1999	Un café... l'addition	Le charmeur	Félicie Dutertre & François Rabes	Short
2002	Double Flair	Thomas Ceyssac	Denis Malleval	TV film
2003	Les Baigneuses	Nico	Viviane Candas	English title: "The Bathers"
2004	Doo Wop	Vendeur des puces	David Lanzmann	
2004	Cinq de coeur	Jérémy Bertrand	Jérôme Cornuau	TV film
2005	Colomba	Orso	Laurent Jaoui	TV film
2005	Vache-qui-rit	Lui	Philippe Lioret	Short
2005	Confession d'un menteur	Vincent	Didier Grousset	TV film
2005	Convivium	Tanguy	Michael Nakache	Short
2006	Marie Besnard, l'empoisonneuse	Maître Vidal	Christian Faure	TV film, English title: "The Poisoner"
2007	Opération Turquoise	L'adjudant Philippart	Alain Tasma	TV film
2008	Le Nouveau Monde	Hugo	Étienne Dhaene	TV film
2008	Adrien	Olivier	Pascale Bailly	TV film
2009	G.I. Joe: The Rise of Cobra	Baron de Cobray	Stephen Sommers	
2009	Cartouche, le brigand magnifique	La Reynie	Henri Helman	TV film
2010	Quand vient la peur...	Mathias	Élisabeth Rappeneau	TV film
2010	Le livre de Marc	Antonin	Claude Farge	
2011	La conquête	Laurent Solly	Xavier Durringer	English title: "The Conquest"
2011	Mystère au Moulin-Rouge	Julien Anselme	Stéphane Kappes	TV film
2011	L'Amour fraternel	Marc	Gérard Vergez	TV film
2011	Un été brûlant	Lepartenare du film d'époque	Philippe Garrel	English title: "A Burning Hot Summer"
2011	Louis XI, le pouvoir fracassé	Clément de Saudre	Henri Helman	TV film
2011	Picture Paris	Waiter	Brad Hall	Short
2011	L'amère nature	Lui	Hugues Espinasse	Short
2012	En apparence	Bruno	Benoît d'Aubert	TV film
2012	Une nuit	Paul Gorsky	Philippe Lefebvre	English title: "Paris by Night"
2012	Mince alors!	Gaspard	Charlotte de Turckheim	English title: "Big Is Beautiful"
2012	Edwige	Seb	Mounia Meddour	Short
2013	World War Z	C130 Pilot	Marc Forster	
2014	Jamais le premier soir	Ange	Mélissa Drigeard	English title: "Never on the First Night"
2014	Pas d'inquiétude	Marc	Thierry Binisti	TV film
2015	Qui c'est les plus forts?	Paul	Charlotte de Turckheim	English title: "You'll Never Walk Alone"
2017	Hostile	Jack	Mathieu Turi	
2017	Daddy Cool	Renaud	Maxime Govare	
2018	L'école est finie	Raphaël	Anne Depétrini	
2019	Entangled	Max	Milena Lurie	
2021	Journaliste(s)	Kerner	Caroline Proust & Etienne Saldés	Short
2022	Vaincre ou Mourir	Jean-Pierre Travot	Vincent Mottez, Paul Mignot	
2023	Visions	Marco	Yann Gozlan	
2024	Family Pack	Le Capitaine	François Uzan	

=== Television ===
Year	Title	Role	Notes
1998-2001	Sous le soleil	Benjamin	Series regular
2001	Méditerranée	Pierre Lantosque	Mini-series
2002	Vertiges	Lieutenant Laurent	Episode: "Accords et à Cris"
2003	Joséphine, ange gardien	Manu	Episode: "Le stagiaire"
2003	Vertiges	Marco Segal	Episode: "La femme de l'ombre"
2004	La Crim'	Bastien Calais	Episode: "Ivresse mortelle"
2004	Ariane Ferry	Fabrice Adler	Episode: "La monitrice"
2004	Navarro	Serge Lheureux	Episode: "Les bourreaux de l'ombre"
2005-2017	Engrenages	Pierre Clément	Series regular, English title: "Spiral"
2006	L'État de Grace	Docteur Dan Odelman	Mini-series
2007	Chat bleu, chat noir	Skibel	Mini-series, English title: "Cabaret"
2008	Voici venir l'orage...	Itzhak Nadson	Mini-series, English title: "Elena's Destiny, a Russian Saga"
2009	Revivre	Jacob Azoulay	Mini-series
2011	Les Saisons meurtrières	Fabrice Berthier	Mini-series
2012-2016	Les hommes de l'ombre	Ludovic Desmeuze	Series regular, English title: "Spin"
2013-2015	Mr Selfridge	Henri Leclair	Series regular
2015	Odyssey	Luc Girard	Series regular
2016	La Main du mal	Thomas Schaffner	Mini-series
2016	Accusé	Léo	Episode: "L'histoire de Léo"
2016	Beowulf: Return to the Shieldlands	Razzak	4 episodes
2018	Speakerine	Éric Jauffret	Series regular
2018	Le Bureau des Légendes	Jean-Paul	Recurring role, English title: "The Bureau"
2019	Riviera	Noah Levy	Series 2 regular
2019	Beecham House	Benoît Castillon	Series regular
2019	Le temps est assassin	Paul Idrissi	Series regular
2020	Mirage	Thomas Grasset	3 episodes
2020	La Garçonne	Roman Ketoff	Mini-series
2021	Peaky Blinders	Jean Claude, seafaring smuggler	Appearance during Season 6
2022	The Forest of the Missing (Les Disparus de la Forêt Noire)	Erik Maes, police chief inspector	Mini-series
2024	Cat's Eyes	Michaël Heinz	TV series
2025	Erica	Patrick Saab	TV series

== Awards and nominations ==
Year	Award	Category	Work	Result
2017	A Night of Horror International Film Festival	Best Male Performance	Hostile	Nominated
2017	Fantastic Planet Film Festival	Best Actor	Hostile	Nominated
2017	FilmQuest Cthulhu	Best Supporting Actor	Hostile	Nominated
2017	New York City Horror Film Festival	Best Actor	Hostile	Won
2017	Nocturna Madrid International Fantastic Film Festival	Official International Competition for Best Acting	Hostile	Nominated
2017	Other Worlds Austin SciFi Film Festival	Best Feature Actor	Hostile	Nominated
2018	Fantaspoa International Fantastic Film Festival	Best Actor	Hostile	Nominated
