= Abdelhafid Metalsi =

French-Algerian actor

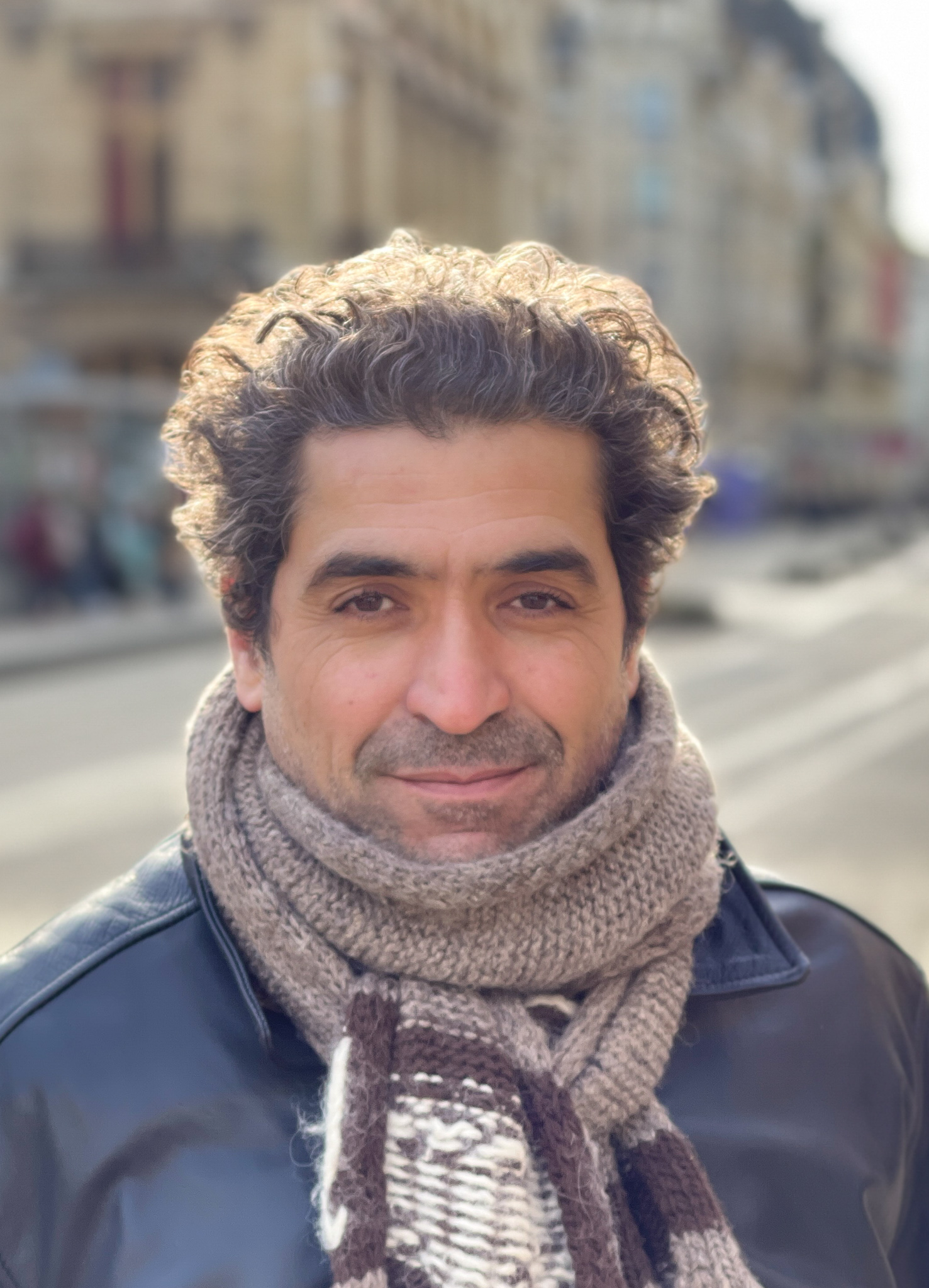
Abdelhafid Metalsi in 2021

Abdelhafid Metalsi (born 1969) is a French-Algerian actor. He is best known for his starring role as the dedicated Capitaine Kader Chérif in the French police series Cherif.

== Life and career ==
Born in Algeria in 1969, Abdelhafid Metalsi moved to France at age one, to the Champagne province, where he grew up. He lived in the Orgeval district in Reims for part of his childhood. He began training as an actor at the Chaillot National Theater which gave him the chance to work on stage and act in television shows such as Spiral season 4 (Canal+) and Spin (France 2). Metalsi is especially known for his role as captain Kader Chérif, the lead character in the police drama Cherif, which was broadcast on the France 2 network from 2013 to 2019.

== Filmography ==
- 2000 : L'Electron libre
- 2003 : Hymne à la gazelle, (short film)
- 2005 : Zim and Co.
- 2005 : Nuit noire, 17 octobre 1961, (TV film)
- 2005 : Groupe flag, (TV series)
- 2005 : Le Tigre et la Neige
- 2005 : Munich
- 2006 : En el hoyo, (short film)
- 2006 : La Jungle
- 2006 : Pour l'amour de Dieu, (TV film)
- 2006 : Femmes de loi, (TV series)
- 2006 : Mauvaise Foi
- 2006 : Mafiosa, le clan, (TV series)
- 2007 : Tout est bon dans le cochon, (short film)
- 2007 : Michou d'Auber
- 2007 : L'Ennemi intime
- 2007 : Andalucia
- 2007 : L'Affaire Ben Barka, (TV film)
- 2007 : La Commune, (TV series)
- 2008 : Un roman policier
- 2008 : Terre de lumière, (TV series)
- 2008 : L'Instinct de mort
- 2008 : Un si beau voyage
- 2008 : Versailles
- 2009 : Le choix de Myriam, (TV film)
- 2009 : Adieu Gary
- 2009 : Le Siffleur
- 2010 : Alice Nevers, le juge est une femme, (TV series)
- 2010 : Des hommes et des dieux
- 2010 : Les Mains libres
- 2010 : The Assault
- 2011 : L'Exercice de l'État
- 2011 : Une nouvelle vie
- 2012 : Il était une fois, une fois
- 2012 : Spin (Les Hommes de l'ombre) (TV servies)
- 2012 : L'Affaire Gordji : Histoire d'une cohabitation, (TV film)
- 2012 : Engrenages, (TV series)
- 2012 : Au nom d'Athènes, (TV film)
- 2013 : Les Invincibles
- 2013 : Cherif, (TV series)

== Theatre ==
- Femmes fatales on the subject of Sénèque and Shakespeare, directed by Élisabeth Chailloux, Théâtre des Quartiers d'Ivry
- La vie qui va, directed by Yves Guerre, Compagnie Arc-en-Ciel
- Le point de vue de la vache sacrée by Sholby, directed by Alexis Monceaux
- Andromaque by Jean Racine, directed by Abdelhafid Metalsi

== Awards and nominations ==
- Festival Series Mania : the 2013 best actor in a French television series for Cherif.
