= Treat Me Like Fire =

- Directed by: Marie Monge
- Screenplay by: Marie Monge; Julien Guetta; Romain Compingt
- Produced by: Michaël Gentile
- Starring: Tahar Rahim; Stacy Martin
- Cinematography: Paul Guilhaume
- Edited by: François Quiqueré
- Music by: Nicolas Becker
- Production companies: The Film; BAC Films; Playtime Productions
- Distributed by: BAC Films
- Release date: 11 May 2018 (Cannes)
- Running time: 105 minutes
- Country: France
- Language: French

Treat Me Like Fire (French: Joueurs) is a 2018 French drama film directed by Marie Monge. It was selected to screen in the Directors' Fortnight section at the 2018 Cannes Film Festival.

== Cast ==
- Tahar Rahim as Abel
- Stacy Martin as Ella
- Bruno Wolkowitch as Ivo
- Karim Leklou as Nacim
- Marie Denarnaud as Sandra
- Jean-Michel Correia as Diako
- Henri-Noël Tabary as Romain
- Jonathan Couzinié as Franck
- Roman Kossowski as Simon
- Alassana Traore as Baba
