= Pierre-Benoist Varoclier =

French actor

- Born: 30 April 1983 (age 43); Fontainebleau, France
- Education: Conservatoire National Supérieur d'Art Dramatique, Harvard University, École Normale Supérieure
- Occupations: Actor and director
- Years active: 2008–present

Pierre-Benoist Varoclier (born 30 April 1983 in Fontainebleau, France) is a French actor, theatre director, writer and producer. Former chess champion and financial consultant, he made his film debut as a child in Volker Schlöndorff's The Ogre (1996).

== Biography ==
Varoclier first studied economics and philosophy in business school, at École Normale Supérieure, at Harvard University, and at Bristol University. He began his career as an auditor in a large American firm, but chose not to pursue this career path. Consequently, he trained as an actor at the London Academy of Music and Dramatic Art (LAMDA, Class of 2008) and at the Conservatoire National Supérieur d'Art Dramatique (CNSAD, Class of 2009) in Paris. Varoclier was elected Talent Cannes in 2012 at the Cannes Film Festival.

== Chess champion ==
Former junior chess champion, Varoclier started competing at the age of 8, as a young prodigy, often winning over experienced adult players. He won inter-club tournaments, then junior tournaments in parisian districts (in 1991 and 1992), as well as two junior titles in Brussels (in 1993) and in Prague (in 1994). He belongs to the generation of future French international grandmaster Étienne Bacrot: hence, he faced him 4 times, winning only once though. He stopped competing at the end of 1994, age 11, the year of his best Elo ranking (2179), ranked 173rd worldwide at the time.

== Selected filmography ==
- The Ogre, directed by Volker Schlöndorff (1996)
- Don't Worry, I'm Fine, directed by Philippe Lioret (2006)
- Tell No One, directed by Guillaume Canet (2006)
- CZ12, directed by Jackie Chan (2012)
- Little White Lies, directed by Guillaume Canet (2012)
- French Blood, directed by Diastème (2015)
- Le Petit Cyrano, directed by Thibault Mombellet (2013)
- Les Cardinaux, directed by Ambarish Manepalli (2013)
- My Golden Days, directed by Arnaud Desplechin (2015)
- Rock'n'roll, directed by Guillaume Canet (2017)
- The Chalet, directed by Camille Bordes-Resnais (2018)
- Alice and the Mayor, directed by Nicolas Pariser (2019)
- Claire Andrieux, directed by Olivier Jahan (2020)
- Le Mystère De La Chambre Jaune, directed by François Velle (2026)
