= The Squad (2015 film) =

- Film poster
- Directed by: Benjamin Rocher
- Written by: François Loubeyre; Tristan Schulmann
- Produced by: Henri Debeurme; Thierry Desmichelle; Allan Niblo; James Richardson; Raphaël Rocher; Lionel Uzan
- Starring: Jean Reno
- Cinematography: Jean-François Hensgens
- Edited by: Sébastien de Sainte Croix
- Music by: Laurent Perez
- Production companies: Capture the Flag Films; Vertigo Films; M6 Films
- Distributed by: SND Films
- Release date: 19 August 2015
- Running time: 90 minutes
- Country: France
- Language: French
- Box office: $2.9 million

The Squad (original title: Antigang) is a 2015 French action film directed by Benjamin Rocher and starring Jean Reno. It is a remake of the 2012 film The Sweeney, which in turn was inspired by the popular television series The Sweeney. In the UK it is marketed as The Sweeney: Paris. A sequel titled The Squad: Home Run was releases in 2023.

== Cast ==
- Jean Reno as Serge Buren
- Caterina Murino as Margaux
- Alban Lenoir as Cartier
- Thierry Neuvic as Becker
- Stéfi Celma as Ricci
- Oumar Diaw as Manu
- Jakob Cedergren as Kasper
- Karl Amoussou as Reda
- Sabrina Ouazani as Nadia
- Jess Liaudin as Waked
- Féodor Atkine as Tancrède
- Jean-Toussaint Bernard as Boulez
- Sébastien Lalanne as Genoves
- Stephen Scardicchio as Fedor
- Michaël Troude as Zied
- Frédéric Dessains as Jamart
- Vincent Gatinaud as Grégoire
