= List of Spiral episodes =

Spiral is a French television police drama series created by the TV production company Son et Lumière. Its original French title is Engrenages, the literal meaning of which is "gears", but figuratively translates to "inescapable series of events". Since the series premiere on 13 December 2005, eight seasons have aired on Canal+ in France, most recently in 2020.

== Series overview ==
Series	Episodes	Originally released	
Series	Episodes	First released	Last released
1	8	13 December 2005	3 January 2006
2	8	12 May 2008	2 June 2008
3	12	3 May 2010	7 June 2010
4	12	3 September 2012	8 October 2012
5	12	10 November 2014	15 December 2014
6	12	30 December 2017	3 February 2018
7	12	4 February 2019	11 March 2019
8	10	7 September 2020	5 October 2020

== Episodes ==
=== Season 1 (2005–06) ===
No.	Title	Directed by	Written by	Original release date
1	"Episode 1"	Philippe Triboit	Guy-Patrick Sainderichin	13 December 2005
A young woman is found brutally murdered and dumped in a skip. Leading the investigation is young public prosecutor Pierre Clément, who teams up with no-nonsense police captain Laure Berthaud and investigating magistrate Judge Roban. Together, they must establish the identity of the victim and get to the perpetrators while navigating a tangled web of political intrigue, prostitution and drugs - each with a different vision of justice, each with their own personal demons.
2	"Episode 2"	Philippe Triboit	Guy-Patrick Sainderichin, Laurence Diaz and Martin Garonne	13 December 2005
Pierre must face the possibility that some of his nearest and dearest could be implicated in the murder case he is following, which is now linked to some very high-ranking names. Laure Berthaud's team investigate the apparent murder of a baby by his nanny, while ambitious young lawyer Joséphine Karlsson is recruited as the public half of a new legal partnership.
3	"Episode 3"	Philippe Triboit	Guy-Patrick Sainderichin, Laurent Burtin, Martin Garonne and Laurence Diaz	20 December 2005
When the body of a well-known businessman is found charred to death in his home, police must delve into the details of his personal life. Meanwhile, prosecutor Pierre Clément's friendship with a prominent suspect linked to the brutal Andrescu murder has become impossible to hide. Gilou's drug habit gets out of control. Ghisele, the mother of the murdered baby, finds herself the target of an inquiry about negligent parenting and takes counsel from lawyer Joséphine Karlsson.
4	"Episode 4"	Philippe Triboit	Guy-Patrick Sainderichin, Laurent Burtin, Martin Garonne and Laurence Diaz	20 December 2005
The web of names involved in the brutal murder of Elina Andrescu widens to include a prominent ministerial adviser, who has links to prosecutor Pierre Clément's close friend Benoît Faye. Lawyer Joséphine Karlsson and police captain Laure Berthaud come face to face in court when Laure becomes the object of an enquiry into the fatal shooting of two police suspects.
5	"Episode 5"	Pascal Chaumeil	Guy-Patrick Sainderichin, Paul Berthier and Laurence Diaz	27 December 2005
The inquiry into Elina Andrescu's murder takes yet another disturbing turn when the body of her missing sister Sophia is found in a freezer. Prosecutor Pierre Clément must recognise that the involvement of his friend Benoît Faye goes deeper than he'd been prepared to believe. A distraught and vulnerable Ghisele Anloux is brought to trial in connection with the murder of her baby - though Judge Roban soon comes to regret his meddling in the affair.
6	"Episode 6"	Pascal Chaumeil	Guy-Patrick Sainderichin, Cristina Arellano, Martin Garonne and Laurence Diaz	27 December 2005
Pierre Clément initiates divorce proceedings when estranged wife Marianne and her family business become implicated in a drug trafficking scandal. Lawyer Joséphine Karlsson is called in to defend a man who is charged with brutal acts of torture. Gilou loses control of his drug addiction, testing the loyalty of boss Captain Laure Berthaud.
7	"Episode 7"	Pascal Chaumeil	Guy-Patrick Sainderichin, Laurence Diaz and Alexandra Clert	3 January 2006
Pierre Clément finally resolves to have friend Benoît Faye arrested in connection with the Andrescu case, unwittingly putting Benoît's life in danger. Meanwhile, lawyer Joséphine Karlsson is called in to defend a young man accused of rape, while blackmailed Gilou is compromised.
8	"Episode 8"	Pascal Chaumeil	Guy-Patrick Sainderichin and Laurence Diaz	3 January 2006
With Benoît Faye in intensive care following an assassination attempt, the prosecution in the Andrescu case has lost its main witness. The shady events leading up to the double murder of the Andrescu sisters are reconstructed through Benoît's memories - from his relationship with beautiful Elina to the involvement of debauched ministerial advisor Arnaud Laborde.

=== Season 2 (2008) ===
No.	Title	Directed by	Written by	Original release date
9	"Episode 1"	Gilles Bannier	Virginie Brac and Eric de Barahir	12 May 2008
When a charred corpse is found in the boot of a car in the suburbs, Berthaud's police team are called to the scene along with the prosecutors Judge Roban and Pierre Clément. So begins an investigation which forces the team into the broken, gang-ruled suburbs of Paris and once more to the door of shady lawyer Joséphine Karlsson.
10	"Episode 2"	Gilles Bannier	Virginie Brac and Eric de Barahir	12 May 2008
Berthaud is disciplined for her use of force on a suspect and comes into conflict with Clément over his compromising newspaper interview. Karlsson is taken into Szabo's pay as his accomplice in representing the drug ring. Judge Roban uses his usual cunning technique investigating a strange rape allegation.
11	"Episode 3"	Gilles Bannier	Virginie Brac and Eric de Barahir	19 May 2008
Laure's net is closing in on Aziz, but she still has to call in a favour from Roban to help her hold a suspect. A police stakeout on the estate goes dangerously wrong. Pierre is faced with a moral dilemma as his star begins to rise. Karlsson continues to play a dangerous game with Szabo's shady clients.
12	"Episode 4"	Gilles Bannier	Virginie Brac, Gérard Carré, Lionel Onenga and Eric de Barahir	19 May 2008
Rachid is dead, causing problems for both Karlsson and the police. Gilou has to investigate a murder linked to a gay nightclub.
13	"Episode 5"	Philippe Venault	Virginie Brac, Gérard Carré, Lionel Onenga and Eric de Barahir	26 May 2008
The mysterious north African, Samy, arrives from Special Branch to help with the investigation into the Larbi crime family. Aziz is still out of control and finally pushes one of his young gang members too far - the team are called to a street shooting and the perpetrator is a sinister teenager.
14	"Episode 6"	Philippe Venault	Virginie Brac and Eric de Barahir	26 May 2008
Samy goes deep undercover with the Larbi gang. The police are closing in on Aziz, but as usual nothing is straightforward. Joséphine Karlsson is up to her neck in the dealings of the Larbi gang. Clément plays a clever game behind the scenes.
15	"Episode 7"	Philippe Triboit	Virginie Brac and Eric de Barahir	2 June 2008
As Samy's undercover mission nears its conclusion the team will soon be ready to make their swoop on the Larbi brothers - but an unforeseen complication throws the operation off the rails.
16	"Episode 8"	Philippe Triboit	Virginie Brac, Didier Le Pêcheur, Philippe Triboit and Eric de Barahir	2 June 2008
Berthaud is suspended from her police duties causing Judge Roban to temporarily take over the Spanish operation. Clément has mixed emotions about the situation. With the drug deal finished and the Larbi brothers taken into police custody back in Paris, Sammy's whereabouts remain unknown until the very end. Berthaud confronts Karlsson and the two strike a deal.

=== Season 3 (2010) ===
No.	Title	Directed by	Written by	Original release date
17	"Episode 1"	Manuel Boursinhac	Anne Landois, Eric de Barahir and Simon Jablonka	3 May 2010
The mutilated corpse of a young woman is found. Berthaud is still dealing with the fallout of the Larbi case and faces pressure from her boss, who is seeking a promotion. Gilou tells Berthaud that he is seeking reassignment. Meanwhile, Judge Roban begins investigating a fatal dog attack in the town of Villedieu. After his mother suffers a stroke he must also seek the help of his businessman brother. Clément refuses to keep Roban's boss discreetly informed of the progress of the Villedieu case, and is promptly transferred to traffic court. Another girl goes missing ...
18	"Episode 2"	Manuel Boursinhac	Anne Landois, Eric de Barahir and Simon Jablonka	3 May 2010
A second victim is found, and Berthaud's team are searching for what the press depicts as a possible serial killer. Berthaud will not leave work and is even spotted sleeping in her car. Karlsson and Szabo face the lethal wrath of a disgruntled ex-client. After a dull day of traffic court, Clément succumbs to disillusionment and walks out, throwing away his judicial robes. Gilou and Berthaud get emotional (but not physical).
19	"Episode 3"	Manuel Boursinhac	Anne Landois, Eric de Barahir and Simon Jablonka	10 May 2010
Having announced her resignation at Szabo's hospital bed, Karlsson runs into Clément and the two half-heartedly make plans to start their own partnership. Berthaud's emotional tribulations continue, bringing her closer to Gilou. After false leads with drug-crazed street walkers, the team comes finally finds a suspect with no alibi and the requisite medical training. Roban's investigation of the dog biting results in a formal summons to a very unhappy Mayor of Villedieu – who turns out to be a personal friend of the President of France.
20	"Episode 4"	Manuel Boursinhac	Anne Landois, Eric de Barahir and Simon Jablonka	10 May 2010
Berthaud interrogates Ronaldo, the murder suspect, but makes little progress. Roban continues with the Villedieu case, as well as re-establishing a relationship with Isabelle, his former sweetheart. Clément and Karlsson's first case together proves to be a particularly sordid divorce.
21	"Episode 5"	Manuel Boursinhac	Anne Landois, Eric de Barahir and Simon Jablonka	17 May 2010
Berthaud continues to put pressure on Ronaldo, who now has Karlsson as his lawyer. However, a third murder occurs while he is in custody and Berthaud is forced to release him. Meanwhile Roban's investigation has stalled, so he resorts to underhand measures to ensure that he can continue.
22	"Episode 6"	Manuel Boursinhac	Anne Landois, Eric de Barahir and Simon Jablonka	17 May 2010
During a raid on a drug den Gilou accidentally shoots and seriously wounds a dealer, and to protect him Berthaud has to retrieve incriminating evidence from Bremont. Roban discovers that his own brother may be involved in the Villedieu case, which if revealed means he will be taken off the investigation. A fourth murder occurs and the evidence clearly points to Jesus Berrondo, a former slaughterhouseman.
23	"Episode 7"	Jean-Marc Brondolo	Anne Landois, Eric de Barahir and Simon Jablonka	24 May 2010
Berthaud is not convinced that Jesus is the Butcher of La Villette, and continues to pursue Ronaldo, at the same time as her relationship with Bremont deepens. Clément defends a troubled teenager, while Karlsson has financial problems.
24	"Episode 8"	Jean-Marc Brondolo	Anne Landois, Eric de Barahir and Simon Jablonka	24 May 2010
Berthaud discovers where Ronaldo mutilates his victims, but cannot find him. The death of Jesus complicates the matter further. Meanwhile Arnaud, Roban's intern, is blackmailed into reporting on the progress of the Villedieu investigation.
25	"Episode 9"	Jean-Marc Brondolo	Anne Landois, Eric de Barahir and Simon Jablonka	31 May 2010
Berthaud and the team investigate Niko, a pimp who has been linked with Ronaldo, while Roban attempts to find out who is leaking information.
26	"Episode 10"	Jean-Marc Brondolo	Anne Landois, Eric de Barahir and Simon Jablonka	31 May 2010
Clément finds himself accused of rape, with Karlsson as his attorney. Roban uncovers the traitor in his office. Berthaud and the team continue to track Niko, who has a decision of his own to make; to kill Ronaldo or help him to flee the country.
27	"Episode 11"	Jean-Marc Brondolo	Anne Landois, Eric de Barahir and Simon Jablonka	7 June 2010
Niko decides that Ronaldo must die, and it is a race between the mob and police as who can find him first. Roban raids Villedieu and finds evidence implicating the mayor in racketeering and embezzlement, but is confounded by a surprising confession.
28	"Episode 12"	Jean-Marc Brondolo	Anne Landois, Eric de Barahir and Simon Jablonka	7 June 2010
Berthaud is forced to join forces with Bremont to find Ronaldo, and Karlsson gets the rape charges against Clément dropped, but at a price. Roban also pays a heavy price for closing the Villedieu case.

=== Season 4 (2012) ===
No.	Title	Directed by	Written by	Original release date
29	"Episode 1"	Jean-Marc Brondolo	Anne Landois and Eric de Barahir	3 September 2012
Laure Berthaud and her team soon discover that the unidentified man has been killed by a home-made bomb. The team is distracted from their investigation by internal conflict and the appointment of a new commissioner who wants quick results.
30	"Episode 2"	Jean-Marc Brondolo	Anne Landois and Eric de Barahir	3 September 2012
Berthaud and her team are on the trail of Sophie Mazerat, a student whose car has been traced to the dumping of the bomb-damaged body. Joséphine Karlsson begins her defense of Moussa Koné.
31	"Episode 3"	Jean-Marc Brondolo	Anne Landois and Eric de Barahir	10 September 2012
Berthaud and her team visit the scene of the immolation of a Kurdish detainee and spot Sophie Mazerat amongst the demonstrators outside the centre. Joséphine Karlsson is asked to warn the squat of an imminent police raid.
32	"Episode 4"	Jean-Marc Brondolo	Anne Landois and Eric de Barahir	10 September 2012
Berthaud stakes out the Turkish restaurant that the Kurdish suicide victim was known to frequent and uncovers a work crew of illegal immigrants. Judge Roban uncovers inconsistencies in the investigative procedure in the case of a senior colleague.
33	"Episode 5"	Jean-Marc Brondolo	Anne Landois and Eric de Barahir	17 September 2012
The autopsy of the Kurd reveals a hidden clue which leads Herville to upgrade the case to the highest priority. Karlsson receives a visit from Special Branch, who attempt to blackmail her into providing information about Thomas Riffaut. Gilou is getting in deeper with the sinister Egyptian Sarahoui brothers.
34	"Episode 6"	Jean-Marc Brondolo	Anne Landois and Eric de Barahir	17 September 2012
Karlsson visits Riffaut's new hideout and overhears the gang planning a kidnapping. Clément is called to a judicial review with Jorkal and the wife of Jorkal's missing business partner. Berthaud asks Judge Roban to take on the gun-running case.
35	"Episode 7"	Virginie Sauveur	Anne Landois and Eric de Barahir	24 September 2012
Gilou is given three days to ensure that the Sarahouis' late licence is approved and Roban is warned that Garnier is using underhand tactics to smear him. Meanwhile, Karlsson is pressured by the Special Branch to provide information on the activities of Thomas Riffaut and his gang.
36	"Episode 8"	Virginie Sauveur	Anne Landois and Eric de Barahir	24 September 2012
When the police raid the Sarahouis' flat, Gilou takes the opportunity to break into their nightclub and retrieve incriminating evidence against him. Yussuf cracks under pressure and provides the team with the names of a Kurdish family behind weapons found at Cetin's house. Karlsson turns the tables on her Special Branch investigators and Judge Roban manages to make even more enemies within the system.
37	"Episode 9"	Virginie Sauveur	Anne Landois and Eric de Barahir	1 October 2012
On learning of Cetin's release from police custody, the Ozbeks suspect him of informing against them and Rodi is ordered to eliminate him, but Rodi's associates have other ideas. Karlsson is called to the police station to answer a traffic offence, but is instead charged with perverting the course of justice.
38	"Episode 10"	Virginie Sauveur	Anne Landois and Eric de Barahir	1 October 2012
An online clue leads the team to the anarchists' squat, but during a raid Thomas Riffaut manages to escape. A plastic bag found at the scene of Cetin's execution provides a vital DNA clue. Judge Roban is given the results of his disciplinary hearing, but vows to carry on.
39	"Episode 11"	Manuel Boursinhac	Anne Landois and Eric de Barahir	8 October 2012
Arms dealer Kolabi is taken into custody and confronted with the evidence against him for the murder of Cetin. His sim card reveals further clues linking him to Rodi Ozbek and arms dealing. Riffaut is warned of Kolabi's arrest but is determined to continue with his plan. Berthaud’s team witness Riffaut buying explosives from Rodi, but Riffaut escapes.
40	"Episode 12"	Manuel Boursinhac	Anne Landois and Eric de Barahir	8 October 2012
Herville is ordered to work with Special Branch to find Riffaut, but he ignores the order and risks the lives of Bertaud's team to catch Riffault. Judge Roban's case is heard at the Court of Appeal and he is acquitted and returned to his office. Thomas Riffaut realizes the police are on to him and questions whether now is the right time for their attack. Sophie Mazerat leaves him and attempts to bomb the police headquarters without him.

=== Season 5 (2014) ===
No.	Title	Directed by	Written by	Original release date
41	"Episode 1"	Frédéric Jardin	Anne Landois and Simon Jablonka	10 November 2014
Joséphine Karlsson represents a man blamed for murdering a police officer while Captain Berthaud and her team investigate a shocking double murder.
42	"Episode 2"	Frédéric Jardin	Anne Landois and Simon Jablonka	10 November 2014
Berthaud and her team track down Stéphane Jaulin, whose lawyer turns out to be Pierre Clément. The murder investigation expands to include other possible suspects.
43	"Episode 3"	Frédéric Jardin	Anne Landois and Simon Jablonka	17 November 2014
The double murder investigation steers Laure's team towards a group of bank raiders. Laure is not convinced of Jaulin's involvement, but Roban insists that the father has failed to tell the whole truth. In order to impress the commissioner, Herville entrusts Gilou with the job of breaking up a network of muggers. Experts called to testify in the case of the dead police officer show that the police manipulated the evidence.
44	"Episode 4"	Frédéric Jardin	Anne Landois and Simon Jablonka	17 November 2014
Laure tries to convince Roban that he is mistaken in his pursuit of Jaulin and decides to concentrate on tracking down the raiders, but new evidence emerges which proves damning for Jaulin. Herville piles the pressure on his team to nail the mugging ring, so Gilou proposes an unorthodox alternative. While representing a civil case against corrupt police officers, Josephine Karlsson comes up against an infamous, amoral lawyer by the name of Eric Edelman.
45	"Episode 5"	Frédéric Jardin	Anne Landois and Simon Jablonka	24 November 2014
Herville strives to endear himself to the police commissioner, who is eager to have a case resolved in order to whip up positive publicity, so Gilou steps in with a daring suggestion. But much is at stake, and Gilou's plan threatens to backfire. Laure's team hires an informant who was already on the payroll of Bremont's crime unit. Stephane Jaulin finds himself under increasing pressure as the number one suspect. In court, Joséphine goes head to head with the infamous Eric Edelman, who is defending the two policemen accused of manslaughter and corruption.
46	"Episode 6"	Frédéric Jardin	Anne Landois and Simon Jablonka	24 November 2014
While pursuing the raiders, police come across new evidence which could potentially shift the focus of the double murder investigation. Pierre Clément presses an increasingly inflexible Judge Roban to free his client, as Stephane Jaulin sinks further into the depths of despair, with major consequences. Having been successfully represented by Joséphine in court, young Laetitia Ribeiro is acquitted and finally leaves prison to return to life on her estate. Determined to turn over a new leaf, she soon finds that her options are tragically limited and is roped into a criminal plan.
47	"Episode 7"	Frédéric Balekdjian	Anne Landois and Simon Jablonka	1 December 2014
Devastated by Pierre's death, Joséphine struggles to keep herself together. Laure is also affected, and the two women find some common ground in their shared grief. The police investigation into the double murder has uncovered a link between Sandrine Jaulin and Zacharie Gabbai's criminal gang. An operation is launched to catch Zach and his accomplice. Roban refuses to step down from the Jaulin case in the aftermath of Pierre's death, and resolves instead to bring in a promising young colleague, Carole Mendy.
48	"Episode 8"	Frédéric Balekdjian	Anne Landois and Simon Jablonka	1 December 2014
The operation to capture Zacharie Gabbai has failed and he is now on the run. The police decide to set him a trap. Laure looks into the period in which Sandrine Jaulin's parents worked as a foster family, and a troubling history emerges. Carole Mendy requests Roban's help in a case of violent abuse involving a powerful Libyan businessman, Tarek Ziani. Gilou faces disciplinary action for the use of less-than-legal investigative methods.
49	"Episode 9"	Frédéric Balekdjian	Anne Landois and Simon Jablonka	8 December 2014
Gilou is taken into custody, as his team looks on in dismay. Herville clashes with his superiors. The identity of Lucie Jaulin's biological father is finally established. Egged on by Edelman, Joséphine defends Tarek Ziani and engages in a power struggle with Roban. The police go ahead with their plan to catch Zacharie Gabbai, but the operation is a risky one - especially now that Gilou is out of action.
50	"Episode 10"	Frédéric Balekdjian	Anne Landois and Simon Jablonka	8 December 2014
The investigation picks up when police find a fingerprint amongst Gabbai's belongings which links to the crime scene of the double murder. Gilou is charged with conspiracy and, in an effort to get him off the hook, Laure goes out of her way to request help from the most unlikely of quarters. Nothing short of a bold move is required. Roban is determined to bring down Tarek Ziani and makes a deal with Ziani's lawyer Joséphine.
51	"Episode 11"	Nicolas Guicheteau	Anne Landois and Simon Jablonka	15 December 2014
Following the savage attack on Kimberley, the noose tightens around the criminal activities of Karen's girl gang. But as the police start to close in, they strike again. Meanwhile, it's time to find out whether Josephine's audacity has paid off in her defence of Gilou. The Ziani case runs into trouble when it confronts the machinations of covert international 'diplomacy'.
52	"Episode 12"	Nicolas Guicheteau	Anne Landois and Simon Jablonka	15 December 2014
Roban can't stand to see Tarek Ziani elude his charges and tries to bring him down using the Crime Unit's investigation into a luxury vehicle racket. But Gilou's dealings with a prominent police informant threaten the outcome of the operation. Laure's team pulls out all the stops to find the little girl kidnapped by Karen's gang, as a ransom is demanded in exchange for her freedom.

=== Season 6 (2017) ===
No. overall	No. in season	Title	Directed by	Written by	Original release date
53	1	"Episode 1"	Frédéric Jardin	Unknown	18 September 2017
The detective squad must identify a murdered male torso to keep the case as Laure returns early from maternity leave. A high-profile criminal trial tempts jaded Josephine, while magistrate Roban grows distracted.
54	2	"Episode 2"	Frédéric Jardin	Anne Landois and Simon Jablonka	18 September 2017
Investigating their victim, Laure and Gilou reunite with a superior in a troubled suburb. Lawyer Josephine pushes her client to plead guilty. Roban probes a male prostitute's suspicious death
55	3	"Episode 3"	Frédéric Jardin	Unknown	25 September 2017
Josephine is shaken after an assault. Roban resorts to an off-the-record test to build his case. Gilou and Laure grill two apparently reformed brothers for links to the dead cop.
56	4	"Episode 4"	Frédéric Jardin	Unknown	25 September 2017
Told a guilty secret, Laure plots to correct matters, but must elude Tintin's dogged detective work. Josephine struggles to prove her client's claims in court. Roban must confront a colleague, and a health issue.
57	5	"Episode 5"	Frédéric Jardin	Unknown	2 October 2017
Laure is sure a teen girl's death is linked to the Mercier murder, but proof is elusive. Tintin is stressed by his son's misbehaviour, while Josephine cracks before a crucial court appearance.
58	6	"Episode 6"	Frédéric Jardin	Unknown	2 October 2017
Difficulties escalate for the detectives seeking their teen victim's best friend. A sexual harassment hearing proves revealing of Josephine's feelings. Roban and Laure learn of police corruption.
59	7	"Episode 7"	Frédéric Mermoud	Unknown	9 October 2017
Revenge has repercussions for Josephine. The detective squad, to redeem their reputation after the disastrous Roma camp raid, dig dirt on the corrupt coppers. Laure must make choices for baby Romy.
60	8	"Episode 8"	Frédéric Mermoud	Unknown	9 October 2017
Watching assorted suspects stretches the detectives' resources, but yields results. Josephine challenges Roban's ruling on the male escort case. Gilou has a heart-to-heart with Laure.
61	9	"Episode 9"	Frédéric Mermoud	Unknown	16 October 2017
Violence flares after a cop's shooting of an unarmed man. A sense of injustice fuels Josephine's aggression in the Bodin case and Tintin's feelings on being kept in the dark.
62	10	"Episode 10"	Frédéric Mermoud	Unknown	16 October 2017
No closer to arresting Drissa Camara or the corrupt cops, Laure and her team seek missing teen Maria. Roban is rattled to be testifying in court in his own defence, cross-examined by Josephine.
63	11	"Episode 11"	Frédéric Mermoud	Unknown	23 October 2017
Drissa Camara is double-crossed, but hopes his hold over Gilou will save him. The secrets and lies become too much for Tintin. Josephine is in jeopardy if she sticks to her story.
64	12	"Episode 12"	Frédéric Mermoud	Unknown	23 October 2017
A blunder by the depleted detective team has a shocking outcome, while what Moldovan also sells is revealed. Will Edelman's bluntness sway Josephine? Roban runs out of options.

=== Season 7 (2019) ===
No. overall	No. in season	Title	Directed by	Written by	Original release date
65	1	"Episode 1"	Frédéric Jardin	Unknown	4 February 2019
Police Chief Herville is found dead in a Chinese restaurant in the 13th arrondissement of Paris. Gilou must break the news to Laure, who is being treated in a police rehabilitation centre. Now in charge of the unit, Gilou begins investigating with new recruit Ali, who is fresh out of training. Meanwhile, Judge Roban returns to work from his time off sick only to find he is soon due to take compulsory retirement. And lawyer Joséphine struggles to adapt to life in prison while awaiting trial.
66	2	"Episode 2"	Frédéric Jardin	Unknown	4 February 2019
As the police identify that their top priority is to track down Ryan and his gang, Gilou agrees to work with Laure again, but she must find her place now that he and Ali are a team. Meanwhile, Edelman provides legal counsel to Joséphine to help her get out of prison.
67	3	"Episode 3"	Frédéric Jardin	Unknown	11 February 2019
Ryan is not telling the whole story, so Roban decides to lock him up. The banknotes recovered from the robbery lead police to take their investigation to a nearby housing estate. Meanwhile, a link is uncovered between Wang and Herville, and Joséphine builds a rapport with her cellmate, Lola.
68	4	"Episode 4"	Frédéric Jardin	Unknown	11 February 2019
Laure follows the drug traffickers’ courier to a warehouse in Aubervilliers, where the investigation suddenly acquires a new dimension. Meanwhile, still frail, she struggles to cope with the responsibilities in her personal life. Joséphine has a hearing with the judge. And Roban pursues a case of negligence at a hospital by involving the hospital director.
68	5	"Episode 5"	Frédéric Jardin	Unknown	18 February 2019
Police work to uncover the role of Ryan's elder brother Fouad in the money-laundering scheme. Beckriche calls on his former colleagues at the fraud squad to assist in the investigation, but his decision is controversial. Laure and Gilou make a breakthrough arrest, while Edelman presses for a crime scene reconstruction he thinks will help Joséphine.
70	6	"Episode 6"	Frédéric Jardin	Unknown	18 February 2019
The money-laundering operation closes ranks. Beckriche orders his team to let the fraud squad take the lead with their investigation, but will his colleagues comply? Out of prison, Joséphine finds herself trying to pick up the pieces of her personal and professional life.
71	7	"Episode 7"	Jean-Philippe Amar	Unknown	25 February 2019
Following the debacle resulting in Fouad's death, the team is taken off the investigation. Laure is increasingly concerned about Lebrion's interference, while Josephine realises she also has reasons not to trust Edelman.
72	8	"Episode 8"	Jean-Philippe Amar	Unknown	25 February 2019
Roban falls into a trap set by Josephine and Edelman, whose professional partnership is now, however, on the rocks. Laure and Gilou continue to work on the investigation they've officially been taken off, identifying a suspect who may have been involved in the money-laundering operation. Beckriche's loyalty to his former boss is put to the test.
73	9	"Episode 9"	Jean-Philippe Amar	Unknown	4 March 2019
With his role in the investigation irreparably tarnished, Roban loses his grip on the case. Laure and Gilou go ever further out on a limb with a rogue decision to reactivate the now-dormant money-laundering operation. Josephine, who now works for Solignac, continues to set traps.
74	10	"Episode 10"	Jean-Philippe Amar	Unknown	4 March 2019
Laure and Gilou sink deeper into taking illegal measures, risking yet more grave repercussions. Their former team member Tintin is tasked with investigating their methods. Meanwhile, Josephine does her best to protect Lola. However, she proves to be a most uncooperative defendant - for reasons that Josephine understands only too well.
75	11	"Episode 11"	Jean-Philippe Amar	Unknown	11 March 2019
When Laure and Gilou, under investigation by Internal Affairs, are taken into custody, Tintin is torn between his loyalties to his former colleagues and his new job. Josephine also faces a moral decision about how best to fight Lola's case.
76	12	"Episode 12"	Jean-Philippe Amar	Unknown	11 March 2019
As police close in, Cann plans to make a run for it. But first, he reaches out to Edelman, asking for his help. Josephine intervenes in the investigation but is not immediately trusted. Meanwhile, Laure and Gilou still have not been cleared of wrongdoing by Internal Affairs.

=== Season 8 (2020) ===
No. overall	No. in season	Title	Directed by	Written by	Original release date
77	1	"Episode 1"	Jean-Philippe Amar	Unknown	7 September 2020
With Gilou facing the possibility of prison, Laure's team try to recover their reputation by taking on a case that no-one else wants - the murder of an identified minor in a run-down part of town.
78	2	"Episode 2"	Jean-Philippe Amar	Unknown	7 September 2020
Now in prison, Gilou makes headway as an informer and gets close to Cisco, a dangerous convict coming to the end of his sentence, who is being monitored by the police. Josephine Karlsson meets Souleymane, the 13-year-old Moroccan boy accused of the murder Laure and Ali are investigating.
79	3	"Episode 3"	Jean-Philippe Amar	Unknown	14 September 2020
Gilou is offered a way out of jail if he agrees to become a police informer, but on the condition that he keeps away from Laure. Meanwhile, the police team focus their investigation on the Paris neighbourhood of Barbès, where vulnerable delinquent minors are being exploited by receivers of stolen goods.
80	4	"Episode 4"	Jean-Philippe Amar	Unknown	14 September 2020
The police investigation screeches to a sudden halt when Souleymane disappears. How and where will they find him? Meanwhile, Laure flouts the ban on seeing Gilou, who has got himself hired as a bouncer in Cisco's nightclub. There he meets the security manager, Cisco's son Titi.
81	5	"Episode 5"	Nicolas Guicheteau	Unknown	21 September 2020
Josephine has been blackmailed by the traffickers into defending Maria, their smuggler. Meanwhile, Ali and Laure are struggling with their new line of enquiry. How much information can they get out of their new arrest? And is there sufficient evidence to prove a link between the international smuggling operation and the murder case they are investigating? Meanwhile, Captain Beckriche and Judge Lucie Bourdieu must find common ground.
82	6	"Episode 6"	Nicolas Guicheteau	Unknown	21 September 2020
Laure and Ali identify 'The Alsatian' and get to work on a tracking device hidden under his car by members of a rival gang. Josephine tries to help Souleymane, but her attempts fall short.
83	7	"Episode 7"	Nicolas Guicheteau	Unknown	28 September 2020
Laure confronts Gilou when she discovers he has been instrumental in helping Cisco's gang acquire weapons for the upcoming heist. Meanwhile, Edelman must work out how to best act in Lola's defence.
84	8	"Episode 8"	Nicolas Guicheteau	Unknown	28 September 2020
Laure tells Ali that Gilou has infiltrated Cisco's gang. They play for time in their investigation to protect him, but their efforts are jeopardised when Judge Bourdieu orders the arrest of Cisco's son Titi.
85	9	"Episode 9"	Frédéric Jardin	Unknown	5 October 2020
Josephine heads back to Paris with young Youssef, but his brother Souleymane is now in grave danger. Judge Vargas, who was in charge of Gilou's infiltration, decides to cut his losses. What will the consequences be for Gilou?
86	10	"Episode 10"	Frédéric Jardin	Unknown	5 October 2020
On the day of the hold-up, last-minute changes cause chaos, and the police's meticulously planned intervention is thrown into disarray. As the situation becomes more and more dangerous, Laure does all she can to get Gilou to safety. But her options are limited – and very risky.
