= L'État de Grace =

L'État de Grace is a 2006 French mini-series directed by Pascal Chaumeil.

== Plot ==
L'État de Grace is a comedy about power, politics, and the place of women today and their relationships with men. It features the first woman president of France, Grace played by Anne Consigny.

== Cast ==
- Anne Consigny ... Grace Bellanger
- Frédéric Pierrot ... Xavier
- Zinedine Soualem ... Jean-Jacques Chrétien
- Yves Jacques ... Bertrand Saint-Amor
- André Marcon ... Victor Tage
- Martine Chevallier ... Lise
- Marie-Sohna Conde ... Virginie Morelle
- Farida Ouchani ... Amalia Belkassem
- Dominique Thomas ... Pablo Gonzales
- Raphaël Lenglet ... Lionel
- Thierry Godard ... Cyril Tesson
- Michelle Goddet ... Clémence Acera
- Momosse ... Jean-Paul
- Francis Leplay ... Cédric Pierrot
- Ahmed Elkourachi ... Karim Belkassem
- Jérôme Bertin ... Pascal Anvers
- Daniel Martin ... Sébastien Orsini
- Eric Naggar ... Hippolyte Gardon
- Pierre Poirot ... Julien Debarre
- Blandine Pélissier ... Maria Monteuil
- Boris Rehlinger ... Frédéric Castelneau
- Gérard Bôle du Chaumont ... Fabien Dumez
- Christophe Barbier ... Christophe Hétier
- Stéphane Roquet ... Jean-Pierre, envoyé spécial
- Paya Bruneau ... Séverine, envoyée spéciale
- Vladimir Melechtchouk ... Vladimir Zadkine
- Jacques Bondoux ... Gilbert Letaye
- Lucien Jean-Baptiste ... Fred Brago
- Brigitte Tourtchaninoff ... Ruta Kreiviene
- François Clavier ... Colonel Éric Grand-Pierre
- Annick Roux ... Monique Breillat-Sempé
- Valérie Dashwood ... Delphine Aubagne
- Carlo Ferrante ... Marcello
- Jean-Christophe Pagnac ... Jean-Christophe
- Grégory Fitoussi ... Doctor Dan Odelman
- Jézabel Marques ... Sylvie Fontaine
- Nicolas Pignon ... Pierre Antonin
- Joseph Chanet ... M. Tian Congming
- Patrick Bonnel ... Général Jean-Marc Englein
- John Arnold ... Arnaud Brice-Forte
- Emiliano Suarez ... Fernando Portillo
- Jean-Pierre Becker ... Erwan Gessu
- Yoav Krief ... Amine Belkassen
- Océane Drame ... Jamila Belkassem
- Daniel Kenigsberg ... Jean-Yves Montausier
- Hector De Malba ... Nelson Moretti-Bermudez
- Gabrielle Centanini... Yvette Cardinal
- François Berland ... Professeur Éric Alban
- Michel Chaigneau ... Jean- Bernard Buisson
- Danielle Durou ... Jacqueline Maillet (as Danièle Durou)
- Floriant ... Gérald Azzia
- Hélène Alexandridis... Élisabeth Guignard
- Claude Lévèque ... Tristan Chéneaux
- Hervé Falloux ... Fabien Cortez
- Fabien Orcier ... Étienne Garcia-Finel
- Marie-Philomène Nga... Mamadou Macky Kébé
- Pierre Gérard ... Fabrice Étienne
- Malika Alaoui ... Ezina Belkassem
- Denis Ménochet ... The taxi driver
- Pascal N'Zonzi ... The taxi driver
- Philippe Laudenbach ... The server
