= Lagardère (film) =

Lagardere is a two-part 2003 (2005 - expanded version) TV movie, directed by Henri Helman, based on the novel Le Bossu ("The Hunchback") by Paul Féval.

== Cast ==
- Bruno Wolkowitch : Henri de Largardère, le bossu
- Yvon Back : Philippe de Gonzague
- Clio Baran : Aurore de Nevers, adult
- Christian Hecq : Peyrolles
- Frédéric Van Den Driessche : Philippe de Nevers
- Florence Pernel : Inès de Nevers/Caylus
- Jacques Frantz : Cocardasse
- Ticky Holgado : Passepoil
- Priscilla Bescond : Flore
- Julien Guiomar : le Marquis de Caylus
- Isabelle Caubère : Anne
- Pierre Gérard : Le Régent
- Michel Modo : French Ambassador
- Florence Muller : Jeanne
- Michaël Abiteboul : The drunk man
