= Jean-Toussaint Bernard =

French actor and screenwriter

- Born: Bernard; August 8, 1980 (age 45); France
- Occupations: Actor, Scenarist
- Years active: 2003-present
- Known for: On Tour; The Squad; Brèves de comptoir The Tunnel (TV series)

Jean-Toussaint Bernard (August 8, 1980) is a French actor and screenwriter.

== Education ==
He studied at the Conservatoire national supérieur d'art dramatique.

== Theater ==
- 2003: Le Nouvel Appartement de Carlo Goldoni, by Muriel Mayette-Holtz, Studio-Théâtre de la Comédie-Française.
- 2004: Le Balcon ou à peu près (Jean Genet), by Jean-Michel Rabeux, Théâtre du Conservatoire.
- 2005: Songe, Tempête (William Shakespeare), by Georges Lavaudant, Théâtre du Conservatoire.
- 2005: Le Condamné à mort (Jean Genet), by Julie Brochen, Auditorium du Louvres.
- 2006: Histoire vraie de la Perichole (Jacques Offenbach), by Julie Brochen, Aix-en-Provence Festival and théâtre de l'Aquarium.
- 2006: L'Objecteur (Michel Vinaver), by Claude Yersin, Nouveau théâtre d'Angers.
- 2007: Variations / Jean-Luc Lagarce, by Julie Brochen, Théâtre de l'Aquarium.
- 2007: L'Architecte (David Greig), by Matthew Jocelyn, Ateliers du Rhin, CDN de Colmar.
- 2008: Good Canary (Zach Helm), by John Malkovich.
- 2009: On ne payera pas pour l'oxygène (Artistide Tarnagda), mise en scène d'Eva Doumbia, Théâtre des Bernardines.
- 2011: S.A.R.L. faits divers (Benjamin Bellecour and Antoine Durand), by Jonathan Cohen and Benjamin Bellecour, Ciné 13 Théâtre.

== Filmography ==
=== Cinema ===
- 2010: On Tour by Mathieu Amalric.
- 2010: Je pourrais être votre grand-mère, short film by Bernard Tanguy.
- 2013: Brèves de comptoir de Jean-Michel Ribes.
- 2014: J'ai pas envie qu'on se quitte maintenant by Joachim Cohen.
- 2015: The Squad by Benjamin Rocher.
- 2015: Mon amour by Liova Jedlicki.
- 2021: The Accusation by Yvan Attal

=== Television ===
- 2010: Mission sacrée by Daniel Vigne.
- 2010: Dame de cœur by Charlotte Brandström.
- 2010: Bienvenue à Bouchon by Luc Béraud.
- 2010: Dame de pique by Philippe Venault.
- 2011: Dame de carreau by Alexis Lecaye.
- 2012: Un crime oublié by Patrick Volson.
- 2012: Dame de trèfle by Philippe Venault.
- 2012: Dame de sang by Alexis Lecaye.
- 2013: Zygomatiques by Stephen Cafiero.
- 2013: The Tunnel (season 1) by Philip Martin, Thomas Vincent, Udayan Prasad.
- 2013: Dame d'atout by Alexis Lecaye et Camille Bordes-Resnais.
- 2013: Lazy Company (season 2) by Samuel Bodin.
- 2013: France Kbek (season 1) by Jonathan Cohen and Jérémie Galan.
- 2013: Dame de cendres by Patrice Martineau.
- 2014: Dame de feu by Camille Bordes-Resnais.
- 2015: France Kbek (season 2) by Jonathan Cohen and Jérémie Galan.
- 2015: Dame de glace by Camille Bordes-Resnais.
- 2017: Missions by Julien Lacombe (TV series).
- 2017: Robin by Alice Douard.

=== Scenario ===
- 2015: Mon amour by Liova Jedlicki.
