= Jean-Pierre Elkabbach =

French journalist (1937–2023)

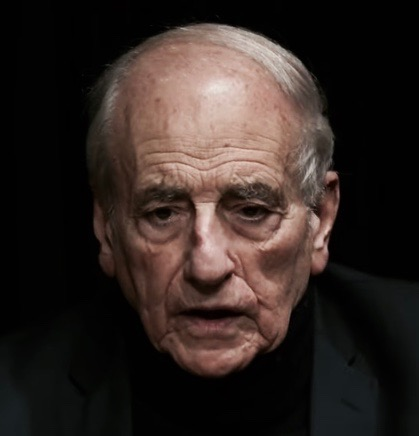
- Elkabbach in 2022
- Born: Haïm Jean-Pierre El Kabbach; 29 September 1937; Oran, French Algeria
- Died: 3 October 2023 (aged 86); Paris, France
- Education: French Press Institute; Sciences Po
- Occupation: Journalist
- Spouse: Nicole Avril
- Children: Emmanuelle Bach

Jean-Pierre Elkabbach (29 September 1937 – 3 October 2023) was a French journalist.

== Biography ==
Elkabbach was born to an Algerian Jewish family in Oran on 29 September 1937, then the prefecture of the département d'Oran in French Algeria. He began his journalistic career in 1960 as a radio correspondent in Algiers, but having taken part in the strikes of May 1968, he was sidelined and sent to Toulouse. Elkabbach would later spend time in Bonn, Germany, before venturing into television news in 1970. From 1993 to 1996 he served as president of France 2 and France 3, from 1999 to 2009 he was president of the television station Public Sénat, and he was at the helm of Europe 1 from 2005 to 2008.

Elkabbach presented Bibliothèque Médicis on Public Sénat, during which he interviewed an eclectic mix of international literati, political leaders, intellectuals, and historians.

Elkabbach was the father of successful actress Emmanuelle Bach. Jean-Pierre Elkabbach died in Paris on 3 October 2023, at the age of 86.

== Works ==
=== Books ===
- Passion et longueur de temps. Éditions Fayard. 1989. ISBN 2-213-02330-1. (with Édouard Balladur)
- Taisez-vous Elkabbach !. Éditions Flammarion. 1992. ISBN 2-08-064421-1. (with Nicole Avril)
- 29 mois et quelques jours. Éditions Grasset. 1997. ISBN 2-246-54341-X.

=== Television ===
- François Mitterrand : conversations avec un président, documentary filmed between April 1993 and June 1994, broadcast on France 2 in May 2001 in five episodes
