= Julie Lescaut =

French police television series

- Created by: Alexis Lecaye
- Starring: Véronique Genest
- Country of origin: France
- No. of episodes: 101 (2014)

Production
- Running time: 83 - 100 minutes

Original release
- Network: TF1 (France), La Une-RTBF (Belgium) and TSR (Switzerland)
- Release: 9 January 1992 – 23 January 2014

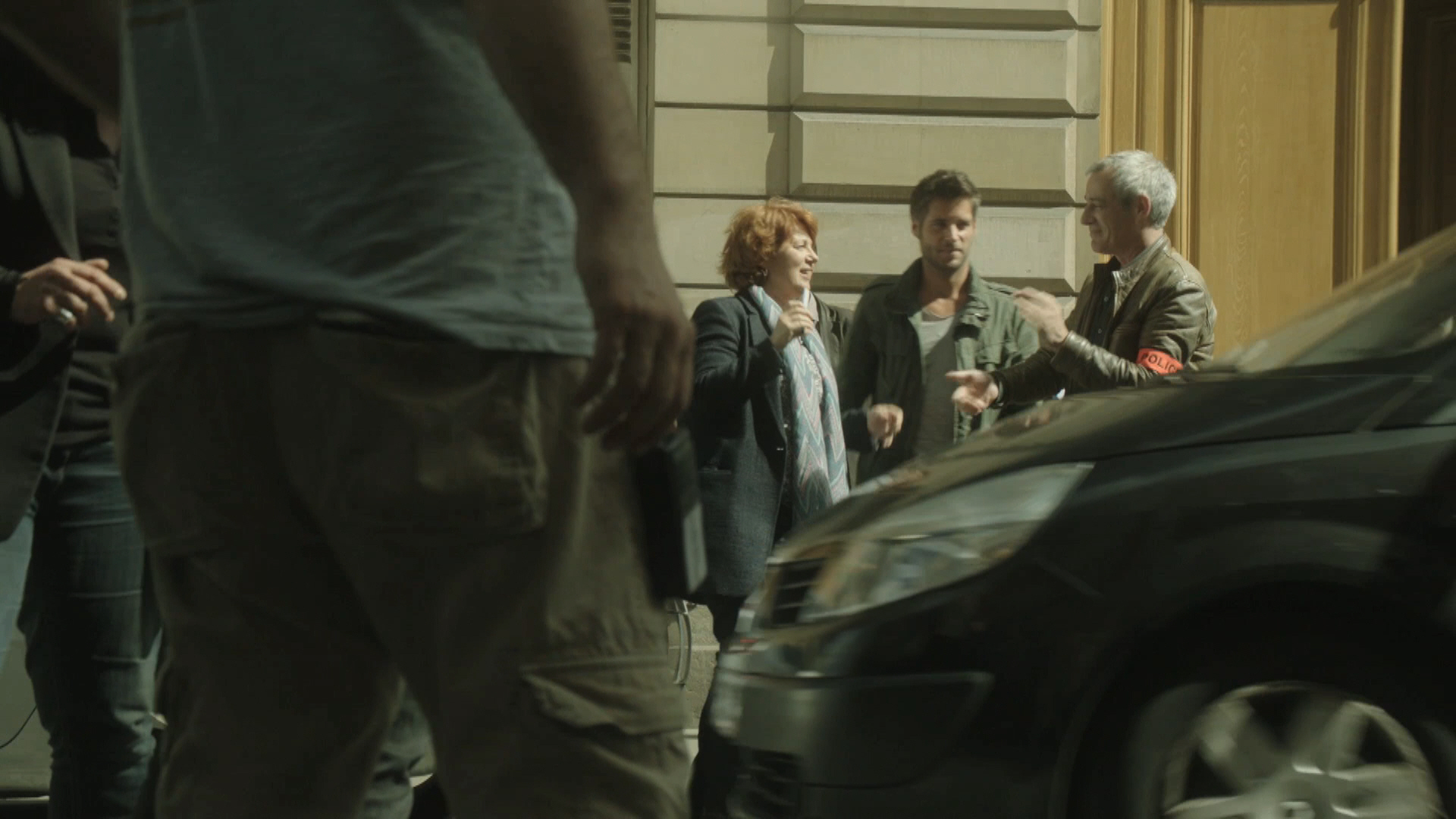
Véronique Genest, Guillaume Gabriel and Alex Waltz. The 101st and final episode of the series "Julie Lescaut" (directed by René Manzor).

Julie Lescaut (French: [ʒyli lɛsko]) is a French police television series created by Alexis Lecaye. It was broadcast from 1992 to 2014 on TF1 (France), La Une-RTBF (Belgium) and TSR (Switzerland). It details the investigations of Police Superintendent Julie Lescaut (played by Véronique Genest) and her team. The show is aired in various other languages, including German, Catalan, Persian, Polish, Slovak, Czech and Japanese (the only subtitled version).

== Recurring characters ==
=== Main characters ===
- Véronique Genest: Police Superintendent Julie Lescaut
- Jennifer Lauret: Sarah, Julie's daughter
- Alexis Desseaux: Detective Motta

==== Secondary ====
- Joséphine Serre: Babou, Julie's daughter (until 2004, and last episode)
- Mouss Diouf: Detective Justin N'Guma
- Renaud Marx: Detective David Kaplan (until 2005)
- Jérôme Anger: Detective Trémois (until 1995)
- Jean-Paul Rouve: Corporal Leveil (until 1998)
- Eriq Ebouaney: Rémi Mertens (2009–11)
- François Marthouret: Paul Lescaut (1993-2000)
- François Dunoyer: Julie's new partner
- Claude Brécourt: Prosecutor
- Jean-Paul Comart: Santi/Delerme
- Nadège Beausson-Diagne
- Mareva Galanter

=== Guest ===
- Agnès Soral
- Alexis Michalik
- Claude Jade
- Albert Delpy
- Alice Pol
- Andrée Damant
- Anne Canovas
- Anne Charrier
- Anne Le Ny
- Arthur Dupont
- Audrey Tautou
- Aurélien Recoing
- Bernard Verley
- Bruno Todeschini
- Carole Franck
- Catherine Hiegel
- Catherine Wilkening
- Claire Nebout
- Delphine Chanéac
- Denis Ménochet
- Didier Flamand
- Élisabeth Margoni
- Elizabeth Bourgine
- Émilie Caen
- Eric Godon
- Éric Prat
- François Berléand
- François Levantal
- Frédérique Cantrel
- Georges Corraface
- Gianni Giardinelli
- Guillaume Delorme
- Hugo Becker
- Isabelle Candelier
- Jacques Boudet
- Jean Benguigui
- Jean Dell
- Jean-Marie Winling
- Judith El Zein
- Julien Courbey
- Laurent Lafitte
- Loïc Corbery
- Marianne Denicourt
- Mata Gabin
- Michèle Moretti
- Myriam Boyer
- Natacha Amal
- Nathalie Boutefeu
- Nicolas Marié
- Pascal Elso
- Pascale Arbillot
- Philippe Bas
- Rufus
- Samir Guesmi
- Sophie Mounicot
- Steve Tran
- Thibault de Montalembert
- Thierry Godard
- Thomas Chabrol
- Valérie Vogt
- Vincent Grass
- Zinedine Soualem

== Directors ==
- Alain Wermus (14 Episodes)
- Josée Dayan (7 Episodes)
- Élisabeth Rappeneau (4 Episodes)
- Caroline Huppert (3 Episodes)
- Charlotte Brandström (2 Episodes)

== See also ==
- List of French television series
