= Spin (TV series) =

French political television drama series

- Also known as: Les Hommes de l'ombre (French)
- Genre: Political thriller Political drama
- Created by: Dan Franck; Frédéric Tellier; Charline de Lépine; Emmanuel Daucé
- Directed by: Jean-Marc Brondolo; Frédéric Tellier; Frédéric Garson
- Starring: Nathalie Baye; Bruno Wolkowitch; Grégory Fitoussi; Clémentine Poidatz; Philippe Magnan
- Composer: Christophe Lapinta
- Country of origin: France
- Original language: French
- No. of seasons: 3
- No. of episodes: 18

Production
- Producers: Jean-François Boyer; Charline de Lépine; Emmanuel Daucé
- Production location: Paris
- Running time: 52 minutes per episode

Original release
- Network: France 2 (France)
- Release: 25 January 2012

Spin (French: Les Hommes de l'ombre - literally The Shadow Men) is a French political television drama series created by Dan Franck, Frederic Tellier, Charline de Lépine and Emmanuel Daucé, and broadcast from 25 January 2012 on France 2.

After the success of the first season in its native France, a second season was commissioned, which premièred on France 2 on 1 October 2014 with 13.5% of the viewing audience. While prime time viewing figures were disappointing, combining those with on-demand numbers led to a more stable audience. A third series was subsequently commissioned. It was broadcast in France in October–November 2016.

In December 2015 it was announced that Spin would air in the UK on More4. The show premiered on 8 January 2016 and the two existing seasons were broadcast consecutively on a weekly basis. The third and final season was broadcast in April–May 2017.

== Synopsis ==
=== Season 1 ===
The President of France, visiting a striking factory in Saint-Étienne in the Loire, east-central France, is killed in a suicide attack. Presidential elections are announced for 35 days later and there is no doubt that the prime minister, Philip Deleuvre (Philippe Magnan), will run for the Élysée. But what few people know is that the Prime Minister knows more than he claims. This grand lie causes a return to business of Simon Kapita (Bruno Wolkowitch), a former spin doctor to the late president. Anxious to preserve the honour of his dead friend and some form of political ethics, this "man of the shadows" sets out to find a candidate who will be able to beat Deleuvre — who is being advised by Kapita's former protégé Ludovic Desmeuze (Grégory Fitoussi).

== Cast ==
Actor	Character	Description	Appearances		
Actor	Character	Description	1	2	3
Bruno Wolkowitch	Simon Kapita	Visage's and later Marjorie's Spin Doctor	Starring	Starring	Starring
Grégory Fitoussi	Ludovic Desmeuze	Deleuvre's and later Carrère's Spin Doctor	Starring	Starring	Starring
Philippe Magnan	Philippe Deleuvre	Desportes' Prime Minister; later Leader of the Opposition	Starring	Starring	Starring
Emmanuelle Bach^{1}	Apolline Vremler	Journalist and ex-wife of Simon Kapita		Starring	Starring
Valérie Karsenti	Apolline Vremler	Journalist and ex-wife of Simon Kapita	Starring		
Yves Pignot	Robert Palissy	Senator; later Marjorie's Minister of the Interior and Prime Minister	Recurring	Starring	Starring
Marianne Fabbro	Juliette Kapita	Simon and Apolline's Daughter; freelance journalist	Starring	Recurring	Starring
Nicolas Marié	Alain Marjorie	President of France	Recurring	Starring	Starring
Carole Bouquet	Elizabeth Marjorie	Marjorie's wife; First Lady of France		Starring	Starring
Nathalie Baye	Anne Visage	Desportes' Secretary of State for Social Affairs and Health	Starring		
Clémentine Poidatz	Valentine		Starring		
Mathieu Barbet	Marc Kajanef	Webmaster	Starring		
Philippe Hérisson	Jean Guénelon	Deleuvre's Chief Cabinet Secretary	Starring		
Abdelhafid Metalsi	Malik Gendre	Head of Presidential Security	Starring		
Aure Atika	Gabrielle Tackichieff	Marjorie's Secretary-General of the Élysée		Starring	
Olivier Rabourdin	Benoît Hussan	Marjorie's Minister of the Interior		Starring	
François Berland	Pascal Diot	Marjorie's Chief Cabinet Secretary		Starring	
Stéphanie Crayencour	Rose Sarfati	Hussan's wife		Starring	
Laurent Lucas	Maxime Beaugendre	Marjorie's Prime Minister			Starring
Rachida Brakni	Clémence Parodi	Marjorie's Secretary of State for Parliamentary Relations			Starring
Aïssatou Diop	Lili		Recurring		
François-Régis Marchasson	Petitjean	Leader of the Parti Du Rassemblement	Recurring		
Smadi Wolfman	Alexandra	Marjorie's Spin Doctor	Recurring		
Sandra Choquet	Claudia		Recurring		
Christiane Millet	Isabelle Desportes	Desportes' wife; First Lady of France	Recurring		
Patrick Harivel		Desportes' Minister of the Interior	Recurring		
Jackee Toto	Jamie		Recurring		
Serge Biavan	Prat	Head of Anti-Terrorism	Recurring		
Cyril Couton		Pollster	Recurring		
François Dunoyer	Pierre Desportes	President of France who is killed in episode 1	Recurring		
Jérémy Bardeau	Arthur Frot			Recurring	
Hervé Pierre		Marjorie's Prime Minister		Recurring	
Elisabeth Commelin	Sonia	Marjorie's Secretary		Recurring	
Lucien Rumiel Braun	Rudolph	Deleuvre's Parliamentary Assistant		Recurring	
Eric Herson-Macarel		Editor of Mediamag		Recurring	
Peter Hudson	Bakian	Businessman and arms dealer		Recurring	
Stefan Godin	Gaillaud	Admiral		Recurring	
Anne Loiret	Annie Vaneck	Director of Directorate-General for External Security			Starring
Marc Pierret	Bataille				Recurring
Anne Benoît	Hélène Sacco	Marjorie's Prime Minister			Starring
Sophie-Charlotte Husson	Anne-Marie Carrère	MP for Hauts-de-Seine and candidate for President			Starring

^{1} In series 1, Valérie Karsenti portrayed Apolline.

== Episodes ==
Season	Episodes	Originally released	
Season	Episodes	First released	Last released
1	6	January 25, 2012	February 8, 2012
2	6	October 1, 2014	October 15, 2014
3	6	October 21, 2016	November 4, 2016

=== Season 1 (2012) ===
No.	Title	Directed by	Written by	Original release date
1	"The Attack" (French: L'attentat)	Unknown	Unknown	January 25, 2012
2	"The Candidate" (French: La candidate)	Unknown	Unknown	January 25, 2012
3	"Aiming for the Centre" (French: La conquête du centre)	Unknown	Unknown	February 1, 2012
4	"The Witness" (French: Le témoin)	Unknown	Unknown	February 1, 2012
5	"The Rally" (French: Le ralliement)	Unknown	Unknown	February 8, 2012
6	"Betrayals" (French: Trahisons)	Unknown	Unknown	February 8, 2012

=== Season 2 (2014) ===
No.	Title	Directed by	Written by	Original release date
1	"The Accident" (French: L'accident)	Unknown	Unknown	October 1, 2014
2	"The War of Nerves" (French: La guerre des nerfs)	Unknown	Unknown	October 1, 2014
3	"Hostages" (French: Otages)	Unknown	Unknown	October 8, 2014
4	"The Spoon of the Devil" (French: La cuillère du diable)	Unknown	Unknown	October 8, 2014
5	"Blackmail" (French: Chantage)	Unknown	Unknown	October 15, 2014
6	"The Exercise of Power" (French: L'exercice du pouvoir)	Unknown	Unknown	October 15, 2014

=== Season 3 (2016) ===
No.	Title	Directed by	Written by	Original release date
1	"Death on the Air" (French: Mort en direct)	Unknown	Unknown	October 21, 2016
2	"Woman in the Shadows" (French: La femme de l'ombre)	Unknown	Unknown	October 21, 2016
3	"Tabloid Politics" (French: Politique People)	Unknown	Unknown	October 28, 2016
4	"Manipulations" (French: Manipulations)	Unknown	Unknown	October 28, 2016
5	"Betrayals" (French: Trahisons)	Unknown	Unknown	November 4, 2016
6	"Game Over" (French: Fin de partie)	Unknown	Unknown	November 4, 2016

== International broadcasts ==
Country	TV network(s)	Broadcast title
Australia	SBS	Spin
Bulgaria	BNT	В сянката на властта
Denmark	DR2	Spin
France	France 2	Les Hommes de l'ombre
Finland		
Germany	SET	Spin – Paris im Schatten der Macht
Greece	ERT	Οι άνθρωποι του παρασκηνίου
Hungary		
United Kingdom	More4	Spin
Islamic Republic of Iran	Ofogh	Men of Shadow
Israel	yes	"Men Of Shadows"

== Recognition ==
Year	Award	Category	Name	Result	Ref
2012	Festival International de Programmes Audiovisuels : FIPA d'or	Meilleure interprétation féminine (séries); Best female actor in a series	Nathalie Baye (season 1)	Won	
2012	Monte-Carlo Television Festival	Prix de la presse - Meilleure série française ("Press award for best French series")	Season 1	Won	
2012	Monte-Carlo Television Festival	Meilleure mini-série ("Best mini-series")	Season 1	Nominated	
2012	Monte-Carlo Television Festival	Meilleur acteur (mini-séries) ("Best actor in a mini-series")	Bruno Wolkowitch (season 1)	Nominated	
2013	Globes de Cristal Awards	Meilleur téléfilm ou série télévisée ("Best TV movie or TV series")	Season 1	Nominated	
2014	La Rochelle TV Fiction Festival	Meilleure série (France) ("Best French series")	Season 2, episode 1	Nominated	
2017	Globes de Cristal Awards	Meilleur téléfilm ou série télévisée ("Best TV movie or TV series")	Season 3	Pending	
