= Emmanuelle Bach =

French actress (born 1968)

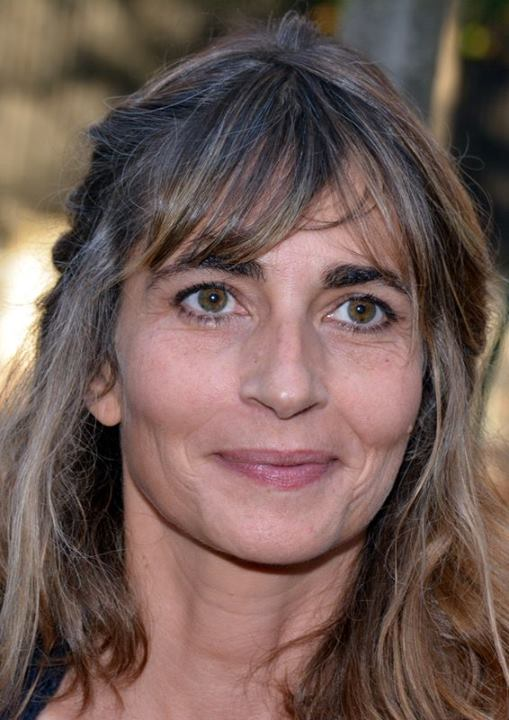
- Bach in 2013
- Born: Emanuelle Anouk El Kabbach; 30 May 1968 (age 58); Paris, France
- Occupations: Film and television actress
- Years active: 1991–present
- Notable work: PJ; Un village français Clem; Spin

Emmanuelle Bach (born Emanuelle Anouk El Kabbach; 30 May 1968) is a French film and television actress.

== History ==
She is the daughter of Holda Trenkle ("Holda Fonteyn") and journalist Jean-Pierre Elkabbach.

At the age of 19, she abandoned her history studies and took dramatic art lessons from Jean-Laurent Cochet. She appeared in her first film in the early 1990s.

From 2008 and 2017, she had a role in the TV series Un village français.

== Filmography ==
=== Cinema ===
- 1991: Les Clés du paradis: a nurse at the psychiatric hospital
- 1994: Coming to Terms with the Dead: the journalist
- 1994: Un Dimanche à Paris: Marie
- 1994: Le fou de la Tour: Sophie
- 1996: Le Retour du chat
- 1997: La Parenthèse by Jean-Louis Benoît: Cécile Moriantes
- 1997: After Sex: Caroline
- 1998: En attendant la neige
- 2002: Les Frères Gravet: Léone Gravet
- 2002: Aurélien: Amandine
- 2013: Le Ballon de rouge (short film) by Sylvain Bressollette: the 38-year-old girl
- 2014: 24 Days by Alexandre Arcady: the examining magistrate

=== Television ===
- 1995–6 : The client (TV series, 3 ep.): Nicole
- 1996: J'ai rendez-vous avec vous (TV film): Sylvie
- 1998: New York Police Blues (TV series, season 6)
- 1999–2007: PJ (TV series, ep. 27 to 127): Captain Agathe Monnier
- 2004: Sauveur Giordano (TV series, ep. "Harcèlements"): Lydia Neuville
- 2005: Vous êtes libre ? (TV film): Audrey
- 2005: Jeff et Léo, flics et jumeaux (series, ep. "Jardin zen"): Marianne Vasseur
- 2006: Avocats et Associés (series, season 9) Crime, Désordre: Captain Agathe Monnier
- 2010: Un bébé pour mes 40 ans by Pierre Joassin (TV film): Natacha Descombes
- 2010: Coup de chaleur (TV film): Claire Noguera
- 2013: Clem (season 3, ep. 8, 9, 10; season 4 ep. 11 & 12; season 5, ep. 16, 19): Vic
- 2013: Enquêtes réservées (TV series, season 6, ep. L'ombre du palais): Nicole Alfonsi
- 2014–6: Les hommes de l'ombre, (seasons 2 and 3): Apolline Vremler
- 2016: Section de recherches (season 10, ep. 10: "L'absente"): Juliette Dantec
- 2008–17: Un village français (TV series, seasons 1 to 7): Jeannine Schwartz, then Chassagne née Decantillon

=== Music videos ===
- Alain Souchon: L'Amour à la machine
