= Cherif (TV series) =

French police television series

- Genre: Crime drama
- Created by: Lionel Olenga; Laurent Scalese; Stéphane Drouet
- Written by: Lionel Olenga; Marine Gacem; Maxime Crupaux; Robin Barataud; Nathalie Hugon and others
- Directed by: Vincent Giovanni; Julien Zidi; Akim Isker; Hervé Brami; Pierric Gantelmi d'Ille
- Starring: Abdelhafid Metalsi; Carole Bianic; Aurore Erguy
- Composers: Christophe La Pinta (season 2 & 3); Hadrien Bongue; Romain Joutard; Raphaël Charpentier (season 1)
- Country of origin: France
- Original language: French
- No. of series: 6
- No. of episodes: 48

Production
- Executive producer: Bertrand Soupey
- Producer: Stéphane Drouet
- Running time: 52 minutes

Original release
- Network: France 2
- Release: October 25, 2013 – 2019

Cherif is a French police television series created by Lionel Olenga, Laurent Scalese and Stéphane Drouet, broadcast since October 25, 2013 on France 2. In 2019, the series was canceled as the main actor (Abdelhafid - Kader) decided to quit.

== Plot ==
Captain Kader Cherif is an unconventional policeman in the Lyon-France police station. With his strange ways he always cracks the mystery set upon him, doesn't leave work much, since he lives across the street from the station. But things change when his new partner, Adeline Briard, shows up. She likes to work by the book and doesn't like Cherif's work ethics and ways. The series falls into everyday situations in Kader's life and a mystery that he solves with his brilliant detective skills and mastermind thinking. And while Adeline is working with what she sees and with what she has on hand, Cherif thinks outside the box, uses his own methods, and manages to solve the case.

== Cast ==
- Abdelhafid Metalsi as Kader Chérif (60 Episodes)
- Greg Germain as Jean-Paul Doucet (60 Episodes)
- François Bureloup as Joël Baudemont (60 Episodes)
- Vincent Primault as Philippe Dejax (60 Episodes)
- Carole Bianic as Adeline Briard (44 Episodes)
- Élodie Hesme as Deborah Atlan (40 Episodes)
- Mélèze Bouzid as Sarah Chérif (34 Episodes)
- Clémence Thioly as Stéphanie Giraud (18 Episodes)
- Frédéric Gorny as Pierre Clément (17 Episodes)
- James Gonin as Gabriel (13 Episodes)
- Tassadit Mandi as Salima Cherif (13 Episodes)
- Arnaud Binard as Pascal Garnier (10 Episodes)

=== Guest ===
- Sonia Rolland as Ludivine Delaunay (Season 1, Episode 3)
- Valérie Karsenti as Anne Delvos (Season 1, Episode 5)
- Philippe Duquesne as M. Médéros (Season 1, Episode 6)
- Nadège Beausson-Diagne as Nathalie Roussel (Season 2, Episode 2)
- Joseph Malerba as Colonel Decroix (Season 2, Episode 4)
- Arthur Jugnot as Cédric Leroy (Season 2, Episode 7)
- Elise Larnicol as Eliane Camara (Season 2, Episode 7)
- Patrick Descamps as Edouard Vasseur (Season 3, Episode 1)
- Delphine Chanéac as Elodie Mansard (Season 3, Episode 4)
- Évelyne Buyle as Céline's mother (Season 3, Episode 6)
- Jean Dell as Léonard Wermeer (Season 3, Episode 9)
- Bruno Lochet as Bertrand Monnier (Season 3, Episode 9 & 10)
- Guilaine Londez as Hélène Sinclair (Season 4, Episode 4)
- Antonio Fargas as Huggy Bear (Season 5, Episode 7)

== Production ==
=== Development ===
In 2010, France 2 called for proposals for a new television series. Lionel Olenga, co-producer along with Laurent Scalese and Stephane Drouet, aimed to create a cop show that was more entertaining. Having worked for the customs for 13 years, he used to listen to TV series music during stakeouts. Cherif does so as well.

In early 2015, the channel renewed the series for a third season due to positive feedback from the second season. Adbdelhafid Metalsi (Kader Cherif) confirmed that on January 30, 2015, that the third season was in the process of being written.

=== Shooting ===
Contrary to the series' usual production methods, it was shot twice, once from October 15 to December 7, 2012 (episodes 1 to 4) and then from February 11 to April 5, 2013 (episodes 5 to 8). The series finale is Season 6, Episode 12, which aired in February 2019.

== Broadcast and Streaming ==
As of July 2022, Series 1 through 6 are available in the United States on the MHz streaming channel.
