= Spiral (TV series) =

French television series

- French: Engrenages
- Created by: Alexandra Clert; Guy-Patrick Sainderichin
- Starring: Caroline Proust; Philippe Duclos; Audrey Fleurot; Thierry Godard; Fred Bianconi; Grégory Fitoussi
- Composer: Stéphane Zidi
- Country of origin: France
- Original language: French
- No. of series: 8
- No. of episodes: 86 (list of episodes)

Production
- Running time: 52 minutes

Original release
- Network: Canal+
- Release: 13 December 2005 – 5 October 2020

Spiral (French: Engrenages, meaning "inescapable series of events") is a French television police procedural and legal drama series comprising eight seasons, following the work and the private lives of police officers, lawyers, and judges at the Palais de Justice in Paris. It was created by Alexandra Clert for the TV production company Son et Lumière.

The first series of eight episodes premiered on Canal+ in France in December 2005, followed by broadcast in the UK on BBC Four during in mid-2006. It was the channel's first French-language drama series, attracting firm critical approval and a loyal audience of around 200,000. The second series, also eight episodes, was broadcast in France starting in May 2008. The third series consisted of 12 episodes and was shown from April 2011. Series four, five, six, and seven each consisted of 12 episodes. The fourth series was broadcast in February 2013, the fifth in late 2014, the sixth in 2017, and the seventh series in February 2019. The eighth and final series of ten episodes was broadcast on BBC Four in the UK during January 2021.

Spiral has been an export success, with sales to broadcasters in more than 70 countries, including Australia, Denmark, Finland, Italy, Japan, Mexico, Portugal, Switzerland, Spain, and the UK. Spiral has received wide-ranging critical acclaim throughout its run, and has been nominated for and won several awards.

== Title ==
The original French title is Engrenages. This word carries various meanings in French. Although it literally translates as either "gears" or "gearing", it is also used in various idioms and the official translation of the title picks up the phrase "a spiral of violence" (un engrenage de violence), though it also carries overtones of "getting caught up in the works" (mettre un doigt dans l'engrenage), "getting some grit in the works" (un grain de sable dans l'engrenage) and even "the cycle of drug abuse" (l'engrenage de la drogue), or "gearing" in the sense of "intensification".

== Premise ==
=== Series 1 (2005–2006) ===
The body of a young Romanian woman is discovered on a Parisian rubbish dump, her face eradicated. As her identity and past life are gradually revealed by the investigating French justice system, it becomes apparent that her story ties to a network of corruption that may touch the people uncovering the truth about her.

=== Series 2 (2008) ===
The story begins with a man burnt to death in the boot of a car on a housing estate.

=== Series 3 (2010) ===
When the mutilated body of a young woman is found on a disused railway track in the North of Paris, near La Villette, Captain Laure Berthaud takes the opportunity to restore her image after her involvement in the death of Mustapha Larbi. She quickly thinks the murderer could be a serial killer, and her intuition is confirmed a few days later by the disappearance of a second young woman with the same physical appearance in the same neighbourhood. Time is running out to avoid new victims but the investigation goes badly: Berthaud and her men make mistakes, losing the confidence of their hierarchy, whilst newspaper articles on the so-called "Butcher of la Villette" increase. Moreover, the prestigious Criminal Brigade, led by Commissioner Vincent Brémont, Berthaud's former supervisor when she was a young police intern, now wants to get back the case.

In the meantime at the Palais de Justice, while investigating an ordinary case of a child attacked by a dog in the wealthy suburb of Villedieu, Judge Roban discovers that the mayor might be involved in a bribery scandal. Prosecutor Machard immediately asks Pierre Clément to use his friendship with the judge to spy on him discreetly, in order to prevent a political scandal: the mayor of Villedieu is a personal friend of the President of France. Upon Clément's refusal, Machard is determined to get rid of this uncooperative subordinate. Meanwhile, Joséphine Karlsson and Szabo continue with their shady transactions.

=== Series 4 (2012) ===
Police Captain Laure Berthaud and her lieutenants, Gilou and Tintin, investigate when, after his homemade bomb accidentally went off, a mortally wounded student is dumped by his accomplices in a Paris wood. Lawyer Joséphine Karlsson is getting herself into dangerous waters defending undocumented immigrants; her colleague, Pierre Clément, surprisingly finds himself representing crime boss, Johnny Jorkal; while Judge Roban returns to the Palais de Justice, sidelined and on the warpath.

As the story unfolds to reveal a group of extremists intent on waging a war against the Parisian Gendarmerie and a dangerous arms trafficking operation, the police and the lawyers begin to turn on each other. Tintin is slightly grazed in the head by a bullet during a raid, is in a coma for a short period and later has PTSD. Roban releases a man accused of rape because Roban believes the man was the victim of a plot to falsely accuse him; one alleged victim of the rapist commits suicide as a result of the release.

Series 4, consisting of 12 episodes, was shot between 22 August and 9 December 2011 and between January and April 2012. It was broadcast in France on Canal+ from 3 September to 8 October 2012. BBC Four screened the series, subtitled "State of Terror," in its Saturday primetime foreign language drama slot from 9 February 2013 with two hour-long episodes a week, broadcast one after the other on Saturday nights.

=== Series 5 (2014) ===
The filming of Season 5 of "Spiral" began on 2 December 2013, and lasted about eight months, producing twelve 52-minute episodes. The series was premièred on Canal+ in France on 10 November 2014, with two episodes shown each evening, though those with a subscription to the on-demand service had access to all twelve episodes at once. Series 5 began airing on BBC Four in the UK on 10 January 2015. The final two episodes were broadcast on 14 February 2015.

=== Series 6 (2017) ===
The series was filmed from May to December 2016 and was broadcast in France on Canal+ from 18 September 2017 and in the UK on BBC Four from 30 December 2017 to 3 February 2018.

=== Series 7 (2019) ===
Filming the twelve episodes began in January 2018 directed by Frédéric Jardin (episodes 1–6) and Jean-Philippe Amar (episodes 7–12). A double homicide in a Chinese restaurant in the 13th arrondissement leads to a wider story of money-laundering networks and governmental corruption. Broadcast commenced in France on 4 February 2019 on Canal+, and in the UK on 12 October 2019 on BBC Four.

=== Series 8 (2021) ===
This series has ten episodes. The examining magistrate Roban (Philippe Duclos) has retired. Lucie Bourdieu (Clara Bonnet) is less experienced and has strained relations with the police. Ali (Tewfik Jallab) takes a regular role. Scenes are set in the new Paris courts in the Batignolles district. Broadcast on BBC Four began in the UK on 2 January 2021.

== Cast ==
- Caroline Proust: Police Captain Laure Berthaud (Commandant – series 7). A skilled Paris criminal police officer who leads an investigative team from a territorial division (2nd DPJ), who break the rules more than French Police normally do. She is known for her energy and tenacity but also for her tough and sometimes borderline methods. Devoted to her work, she is very attached to her men and would do anything to protect them when they make a mistake. Her private life is a mess and she seems unable to build a lasting relationship.
- Grégory Fitoussi: Assistant Prosecutor Pierre Clément. A young prosecutor with a promising career, he believes in his profession and in the integrity of justice. But his success and his righteousness provoke the hostility of his superior, Republic Prosecutor Machard.
- Philippe Duclos: Judge François Roban. An experienced investigating magistrate (juge d'instruction), solitary and hardworking, he knows all the tricks of his trade. Often reproached for his coldness and even cruelty with suspects and witnesses, he attaches a lot of importance to his independence from the executive powers.
- Thierry Godard: Police Lieutenant Gilles "Gilou" Escoffier. Called Lemaire in Series 1. Berthaud's long-time team member. With methods as borderline as his captain's, they often cover each other to escape disciplinary inquiries. Having difficulties enduring the toughness of his work, he has experienced drug abuse.
- Fred Bianconi: Police Lieutenant Frédéric "Tintin" Fromentin (Captain – series 6). Sometimes referred to as Luc Fromentin. Responsible and reasonable, good in proceedings, he is the stable element of Berthaud's group. He generally disapproves of his colleagues' methods and therefore is often torn between straying into illegality and betraying his friends.
- Audrey Fleurot: as Joséphine Karlsson. A clever and highly cynical young lawyer, she is extremely ambitious and always looking for cases that will earn her a maximum of fame and money. She does not hesitate to cross or double-cross to get what she wants.
- Elisabeth Macocco: Marianne, Judge Roban's court clerk (seasons 3, 4, 5)
- Dominique Daguier: Republic Prosecutor Machard (seasons 2, 3, 4, 5)
- Alban Casterman: Judge Wagner (seasons 2, 3, 4)
- Stéphan Wojtowicz: Police Commissioner Aubert, head of Captain Berthaud's division (seasons 2, 3)
- Daniel Duval: Szabo, controversial lawyer and Karlsson's associate (seasons 2, 3)
- Bruno Debrandt: Police Commissioner Vincent Brémont, director of the Criminal Brigade (seasons 3, 4, 5, 6 and 7)
- Nicolas Briançon: Police Commissioner Herville, head of Captain Berthaud's division (seasons 4, 5), Seine-Saint-Denis Divisional Commissioner (season 6)
- Louis-Do de Lencquesaing as Éric Edelman (season 5, 6, 7, 8)

=== Series 1 ===
- Anne Caillon: Marianne Clément, Pierre Clément's wife
- Guillaume Cramoisan: Benoît Faye, businessman and Clément's childhood friend
- Nicolas Silberg: Robert Villequier, entrepreneur involved in pharmaceutical business and Marianne Clément's father
- Scali Delpeyrat: Arnaud Laborde, cabinet counsellor
- Vincent Winterhalter: Vincent Leroy, former lawyer disbarred because of rape conviction
- Mirza Halilovic: Michel "le Roumain", Romanian gangster
- Mélodie Marcq: Alissa, prostitute and police informer
- Stéphane Debac: Paul
- Florence Loiret Caille: Ghislaine Androux, mother, whose baby is killed by the nanny

=== Series 2 ===
- Mehdi Nebbou: Mustapha Larbi, drug dealer
- Samir Guesmi: Farouk Larbi, drug dealer
- Reda Kateb: Aziz, rapper and gangster
- Swann Arlaud: Steph, young police officer intern in Captain Berthaud's group
- Samir Boitard: Police Lieutenant Samy Aroune, specialized in undercover operations (he returns in series 4)
- Michel Bompoil: Robert Bréan, principal private secretary of the Minister of Justice

=== Series 3 ===
- Gilles Cohen: Martin Roban, brother of Judge Roban
- Nicolas Moreau: Didier Courcelles, mayor of Villedieu and friend of the President of the Republic
- Misha Arias de la Cantolla: Ronaldo Fuentes, Mexican illegal immigrant
- Anne Alvaro: Isabelle Ledoré, ex-lover of Judge Roban
- Xavier Robic: Arnaud Ledoré, magistrate in training and son of the previous
- Genti Kame: Niko, Albanian procurer
- Anca Radici: Mila, a prostitute from Niko's network
- Corinne Masiero: Patricia
- Shemss Audat: Nadia, a detective in Berthaud's unit
- Finnegan Oldfield: Dylan

=== Series 4 ===
- Samir Boitard: Police Captain Samy Aroune (also in series 2)
- Jérôme Huguet: Thomas Riffaut, ultra-left activist
- Judith Chemla: Sophie Mazerat, student, activist, and Riffaut's girlfriend
- Amr Waked: Yannis, activist
- Marc Zinga: Moussa Koné, Malian illegal worker
- Jean-Henri Compere: Christophe Vasseur
- Jean-Quentin Chatelain: Jorkal, gangster
- Florence Thomassin: Madame Jorkal, his wife
- Abdelhafïd Metalsi: Bachir Sarahoui, Egyptian smuggler and nightclub owner
- Mustapha Abourachid: Amhad Sarahoui, his brother
- Rony Kramer: Umit Cetin, Kurdish arms dealer
- Anissa Allali: Amina, a police officer from Berthaud's group
- Alban Guyon: Serge, police officer from Berthaud's group
- Pascal Bongard: DCRI Commissioner Catry
- Francis Leplay: Director Lenoir, Chief of the Paris criminal police
- Olivier Pajot: Judge Garnier
- Martine Chevallier: Judge Evelyne Renaud
- Gilbert Thiel: 1st vice-president of the Paris Tribunal (NB: Judge Thiel is an actual anti-terrorist judge who also serves as technical advisor for the show)

=== Series 5 ===
- Anne Benoît: Family court judge
- Fatou N'Diaye: Carole Mendy
- Lise Lamétrie: Madame Delorme

=== Series 6 ===
- Valentin Merlet: Commissioner Arnauld Beckriche

=== Series 7 ===
- Émilie Gavois-Kahn: Sabine
- Mathilde Warnier: Soizic

=== Series 8 ===
- Clara Bonnet: Judge Lucie Bourdieu. An investigating magistrate (juge d'instruction)

== Episodes ==
Series	Episodes	Originally released	
Series	Episodes	First released	Last released
1	8	13 December 2005	3 January 2006
2	8	12 May 2008	2 June 2008
3	12	3 May 2010	7 June 2010
4	12	3 September 2012	8 October 2012
5	12	10 November 2014	15 December 2014
6	12	30 December 2017	3 February 2018
7	12	4 February 2019	11 March 2019
8	10	7 September 2020	5 October 2020

== Broadcast ==
The first series, consisting of eight episodes, was broadcast in the UK on BBC Four starting in April 2007. The second series, also eight episodes, was broadcast in France starting in May 2008, and in the UK on BBC Four starting in September 2009. The third series was broadcast in the UK in April 2011.

Series four, five, six, and seven each consisted of 12 episodes. The fourth series was broadcast in February 2013. The fifth was broadcast in France in late 2014 and in the UK on BBC Four from January 2015. The sixth series was broadcast in 2017. The seventh series was broadcast in France in February 2019.

The eighth and final series of ten episodes was broadcast on BBC Four in the UK during January 2021.

In Australia, the first series was broadcast in 2008 on SBS One, the second series on SBS Two from September 2009 and the third series on SBS Two from mid-2012.

Spiral debuted in North America via Netflix in September 2012, but subsequently dropped it. As of 2025, the series has been aired on MHz+.

== Reception and accolades ==
Spiral has received wide-ranging critical acclaim throughout its run, and has been nominated for and won several awards.

It was nominated at the Globes de Cristal Awards four times, winning Best TV Movie / TV Series in 2007. It was nominated for Best Drama at the BAFTA Awards, and it won the 2015 International Emmy Award for Best Series.

== International broadcast ==
Country	TV Network(s)
Australia	SBS
Bulgaria	bTV, VOYO
Canada	Kodi
Denmark	DR
France	Canal+
Belgium	RTBF
Germany	One
Iran	GEM TV
Ireland	Netflix
Italy	Fox Crime
Japan	AXN Mystery
Mexico	Once TV
Norway	NRK
Switzerland	SF1 and TSR1
United Kingdom	BBC Four
United States	Amazon Prime Video; Netflix; MHz Worldview
Croatia	HRT2
Serbia	RTV
Slovenia	Planet TV
Portugal	RTP 2 and AMC
Spain	AMC
