= Henri Helman =

French director and screenwriter (born 1947)

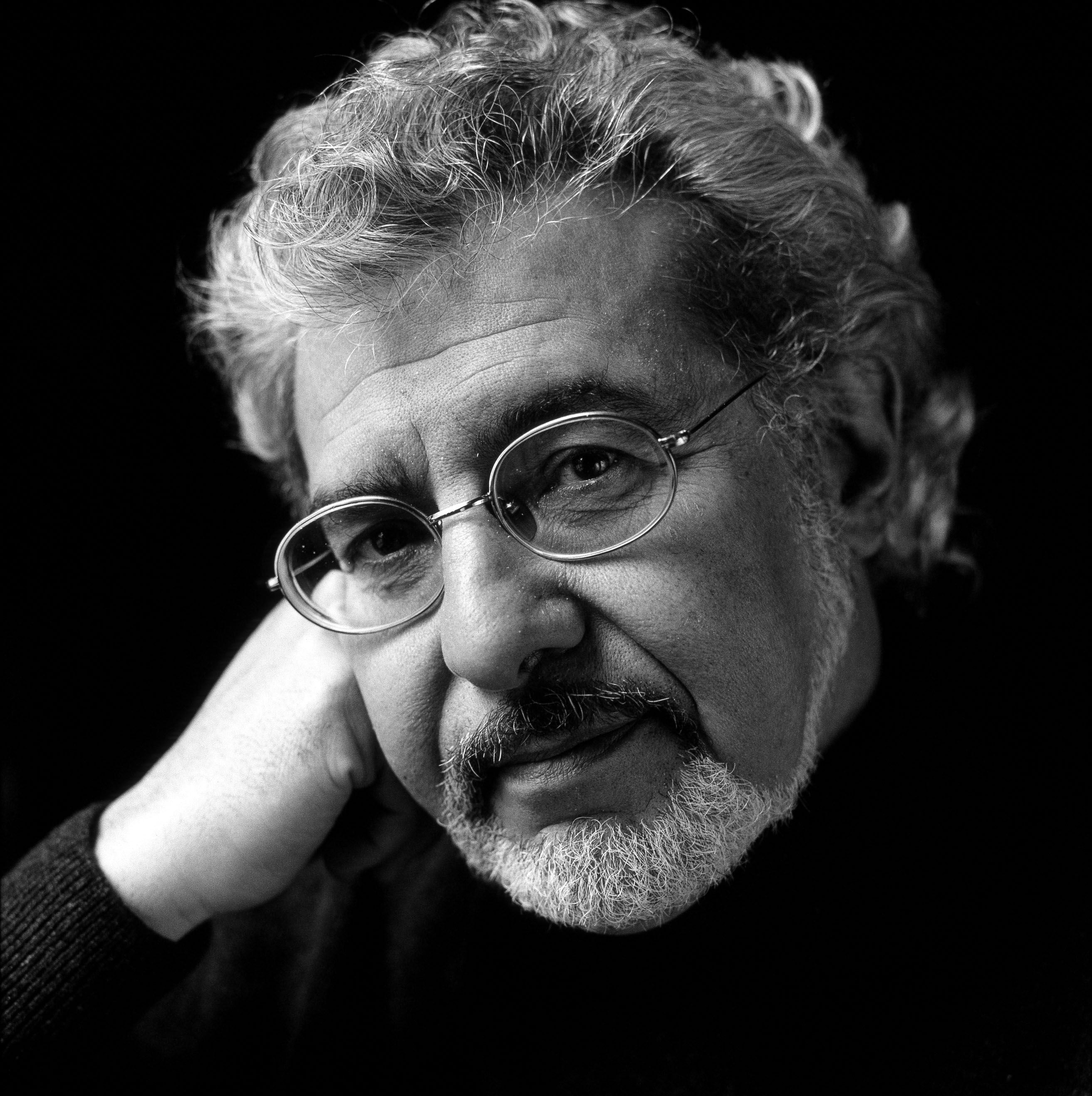
- Portrait of Henri Helman
- Born: 1947 (age 78–79); France
- Occupations: Director, screenwriter
- Years active: 1971 - present

Henri Helman (born 1947) is a French director and screenwriter.

== Filmography ==
Year	Title	Role	Notes
1971	Perched on a Tree	Assistant director	Directed by Serge Korber
1971	Le drapeau noir flotte sur la marmite	Assistant director	Directed by Michel Audiard
1972	Docteur Popaul	Assistant director	Directed by Claude Chabrol
1974	The Marseille Contract	Assistant director	Directed by Robert Parrish
1974	On s'est trompé d'histoire d'amour	Assistant director	Directed by Jean-Louis Bertucelli
1977	Le coeur froid	Director & writer	
1979	Grilles closes	Director	TV movie
1979	Un comédien lit un auteur	Director	TV series (1 episode)
1981	Caméra une première	Director	TV series (1 episode)
1982	Lise et Laura	Director & writer	TV movie
1983	Trois fois rien	Director	Play
1983	Jeu de quilles	Director	TV movie
1984	Where Is Parsifal?	Director	
1991	L'ordinateur amoureux	Director	TV movie
1991	Maxime et Wanda: Une révolution clé en main	Director	TV movie
1991–95	Nestor Burma	Director & writer	TV series (3 episodes)
1994	Rendez-moi ma fille	Director & writer	TV movie
1994	Flics de choc: Le dernier baroud	Director	TV movie
1994	Le JAP, juge d'application des peines	Director	TV series (1 episode)
1995	Le coeur étincelant	Director	TV movie Festival du Film Policier de Cognac - Grand Prix Téléfilm
1995	Vagues de sang	Writer	Directed by Arnaud Sélignac
1996	Flics de choc: La dernière vague	Writer	TV movie directed by Arnaud Sélignac
1996	Commandant Nerval	Director	TV series (2 episodes)
1997	Une vie pour une autre	Director	TV movie
1997	La fille des nuages	Director	TV movie
1998	Théo et Marie	Director & writer	TV movie
1999	Tramontane	Director & writer	TV mini-series
1999–2008	Josephine, Guardian Angel	Director	TV series (4 episodes)
2000	L'institutrice	Director	TV movie 7 d'Or - Audience Vote: Best Movie Made for TV
2000	La double vie de Jeanne	Director	TV movie
2000	Les Cordier, juge et flic	Director	TV series (1 episode)
2001	Méditerranée	Director & writer	TV mini-series
2003	Lagardère	Director	TV movie
2003	Les grands frères	Director	TV movie
2003	Sauveur Giordano	Director	TV series (1 episode)
2004	Menteur! Menteuse!	Director	TV movie
2005	Mes deux maris	Director	TV movie
2005	1905	Director	TV movie
2007	Le piano oublié	Director & writer	TV movie
2007	Commissaire Cordier	Director	TV series (1 episode)
2008	Charlotte Corday	Director & writer	TV movie
2009	La saison des immortelles	Director & writer	TV movie
2009	Cartouche, le brigand magnifique	Director & writer	TV movie
2011	Louis XI, le pouvoir fracassé	Director & writer	TV movie
2012	Simple question de temps	Director & writer	TV movie
2014	La voyante	Director & writer	TV movie
2014	Richelieu, la pourpre et le sang	Director & writer	TV movie
2015	Contre Enquête: Mort d'un héros	Director	TV movie
2016	Le temps d'Anna	Writer	TV movie directed by Greg Zglinski
