= Alexis Lecaye =

French author and script writer (born 1951)

Alexis Lecaye (born August 22, 1951, in Alexandria, Egypt) is a French author and script writer. He also publishes under the pen name Alexandre Terrel and is probably best known for the creation of the long running TV crime series Julie Lescaut.

Lecaye grew up in Lebanon and France. After studying history at university he started working as a script writer for French movies and, later, for the French TV as well. In 1992 he created the TV series Julie Lescaut, which was based on his crime novel by the same name. Since 1980 he has published a string of novels in different genres such as crime fiction, science fiction and children's literature. Some of his books have been translated into other languages, particularly English and German.

For his novel Le Témoin est à la noce he received the Prix du Roman d’Aventures in 1984.
