= List of LGBTQ-related films of 1997 =

This is a list of lesbian, gay, bisexual, transgender or queer-related films released in 1997. It contains theatrically released films that deal with important gay, lesbian, bisexual, transgender or queer characters or issues and may have same-sex romance or relationships as a plot device.

== Films ==
Title	Director	Country	Genre	Cast	Notes
All Over Me	Alex Sichel	United States	Drama	Alison Folland, Tara Subkoff, Cole Hauser, Wilson Cruz, Leisha Hailey, Pat Briggs, Ann Dowd, Gene Canfield, Shawn Hatosy, Vincent Pastore and David Lee Russek	
All the Rage	Roland Tec	United States	Comedy, drama	John-Michael Lander, David Vincent, Jay Corcoran, Paul Outlaw, Merle Perkins, Peter Bubriski and Alan Natale	
Amor de hombre (Love of a Man)	Yolanda García Serrano, Juan Luis Iborra	Spain	Comedy, drama	Loles León, Andrea Occhipinti, Pedro Mari Sanchez and Armando Del Rio	
Any Mother's Son	David Burton Morris	United States	Drama	Bonnie Bedelia, Hedy Burress, Paul Popowich, Fiona Reid, Allan Royal, Shawn Ashmore, Mimi Kuzyk, Peter Keleghan, Barry Flatman, Paul Haddad, Phillip Jarrett, Sada Thompson, Scott Gibson, Cameron Mathison and Michael Gabriel	
Anything Once	Dan Aeberhard	United States	Short, Drama	Michael D. Arenz (credited as Michael Arenz), William Gregory Lee, Traci Burgard (credited as Traci Lee Burgard), Evelyn Valero, Dean Jacobson, Wendy Shapero, Heather Murphy, Claude Knowlton, Chana Marie, Natalie Hays, Brian Willems, Carlos Duarte and Kimberly Klemmer	
As Good as It Gets	James L. Brooks	United States	Romance, comedy, drama	Jack Nicholson, Helen Hunt, Greg Kinnear, Cuba Gooding Jr., Shirley Knight, Jesse James, Skeet Ulrich, Yeardley Smith, Lupe Ontiveros, Harold Ramis, Lawrence Kasdan and Brian Doyle-Murray	
Bent	Sean Mathias	United Kingdom	War, drama	Clive Owen, Lothaire Bluteau, Ian McKellen, Brian Webber II, Nikolaj Coster-Waldau, Mick Jagger, Jude Law, Paul Bettany and Rachel Weisz	
Blue Diary	Jenni Olson	United States	Drama		
Breaking the Surface: The Greg Louganis Story	Steven Hilliard Stern	United States	Drama	Mario López, Michael Murphy, Rosemary Dunsmore, Jeffrey Meek, Megan Leitch, Jonathan Scarfe, Fulvio Cecere, Patrick David, Rafael Rojas III, Bruce Weitz, Gregor Trpin and Greg Louganis	
Bocage, o Triunfo do Amor	Djalma Limongi Batista	Brazil; Portugal	Drama	Victor Wagner, Francisco Farinelli, Viétia Zangrandi (credited as Viétia Rocha), Majô De Castro, Lineu Dias, Eugenia Melo e Castro, Beatriz Beraldo, Cristina Marinho, Ana Maria Nascimento e Silva and Denis Victorazo	aka Bocage, the Triumph of Love
Boogie Nights	Paul Thomas Anderson	United States	Drama	Mark Wahlberg, Julianne Moore, Burt Reynolds, Don Cheadle, John C. Reilly, William H. Macy, Heather Graham, Nicole Ari Parker, Philip Seymour Hoffman, Luis Guzmán, Philip Baker Hall, Thomas Jane, Robert Ridgely, Robert Downey Sr., Nina Hartley, Melora Walters, Alfred Molina and Ricky Jay	
Broadway Damage	Victor Mignatti	United States	Musical, comedy	Mara Hobel, Michael Lucas (actor)|Michael Lucas (credited as Michael Shawn Lucas), Hugh Panaro, Aaron Williams. Alan Filderman, Gary Janetti, Celeste Lecesne, Benim Foster, Jean Loup, Gerry McIntyre, Tyagi Schwartz. Barbara Winters Pinto (credited as Barbara Winters-Pinto), Jonathan Walker and Richard M. Davidson	
Chasing Amy	Kevin Smith	United States	Romance, comedy, drama	Ben Affleck, Joey Lauren Adams, Jason Lee, Dwight Ewell, Jason Mewes, Kevin Smith, Ethan Suplee, Scott Mosier, Casey Affleck, Matt Damon, Brian O'Halloran, Carmen Llywelyn and Guinevere Turner	
Cholera Street	Mustafa Altıoklar	Turkey	Drama, romance, crime	Okan Bayülgen, Müjde Ar, Mustafa Uğurlu, Savaş Dinçel, Burak Sergen, Küçük İskender, Aysel Gürel, Levent Erim, Zafer Algöz, Nilüfer Aydan, Sevda Ferdağ, Zühtü Erkan, Balık Ayhan, Naci Taşdöğen, Emrah Kolukısa, Yeşim Tan, Osman Çağlar, İlhan Kilimci and Hülya Karakaş	
Dakan	Mohamed Camara	Guinea; France	Drama	Mohamed Camara, Cécile Bois, Mamady Mory Camara, Koumba Diakite, Aboucar Touré and Kade Seck	aka Destiny
David Searching	Leslie L. Smith	United States	Drama	Anthony Rapp, Camryn Manheim, Julie Halston, Joseph Fuqua, David Courier, Michael Rupert, Stephen Spinella, John Cameron Mitchell, David Drake, LaChanze, Kathleen Chalfant, Susan Bruce, Craig Chester, Brenda Cummings and Christopher Duva	
Defying Gravity	John Keitel	United States	Drama	Daniel Chilson, Niklaus Lange, Don Handfield, Linna Carter, Seabass Diamond, Lesley Tesh, Ryan Tucker, Erika Cohen, Laura Fox, Kevin P. Wright, Matt Steveley, Steven Burrill and Renee Kelly (credited as Renee Eloise)	
Der Schrei der Liebe	Matti Geschonneck	Germany	Drama	Jürgen Prochnow, Eva Mattes, Matthias Schloo, Katharina Schüttler, Sontje Peplow and Luk Piyes	aka The Cry of Love and made as a TV Movie
Dry Cleaning	Anne Fontaine	France	Drama	Miou-Miou, Charles Berling, Stanislas Merhar	aka Nettoyage à sec
The Full Monty	Peter Cattaneo	United Kingdom	Comedy	Robert Carlyle, Mark Addy, William Snape, Steve Huison, Tom Wilkinson, Paul Barber, Hugo Speer, Lesley Sharp, Emily Woof, Deirdre Costello, Paul Butterworth, Dave Hill, Bruce Jones, Andrew Livingston and Vinny Dhillon	
Hamam	Ferzan Ozpetek	Italy; Turkey; Spain	Romance, drama	Alessandro Gassman, Francesca d'Aloja, Carlo Cecchi, Halil Ergün, Serif Sezer, Mehmet Günsür, Basak Köklükaya, Alberto Molinari, Zozo Toledo, Ludovica Modugno, Zerrin Arbas, Necdet Mahfi Ayral, Murat Ilker and Alper Kul	aka Steam: The Turkish Bath
The Hanging Garden	Thom Fitzgerald	United Kingdom; Canada	Romance, drama	Chris Leavins, Troy Veinotte, Kerry Fox, Sarah Polley, Joel Keller, Peter MacNeill, Seana McKenna, Christine Dunsworth, Joan Orenstein, Heather Rankin and Ashley MacIsaac	
Happy Together	Wong Kar-wai	Hong Kong	Romance, drama	Leslie Cheung, Tony Chiu-Wai Leung (credited as Tony Chiu Wai Leung), Chen Chang and Gregory Dayton	aka Chun gwong cha sit
Hayseed	Josh Levy, Andrew Hayes	Canada	Comedy	Jamie Shannon, Deborah Theaker, Scott Thompson, Mark McKinney	
Heads or Tails (J'en suis!)	Claude Fournier	Canada	Comedy	Roy Dupuis, Patrick Huard, Charlotte Laurier, Albert Millaire, Normand Lévesque, Guy Nadon, France Castel, Arielle Dombasle, Sophie Faucher, Nanette Workman, Jacques Languirand, Micheline Lanctôt, Jean-Guy Bouchard, Dan Bigras, Martin Thibodeau, Claude Rajotte, Paul Buissonneau, Annie Dufresne, Paul-Antoine Taillefer, Louis Champagne, Marie-Anne Larochelle, Xavier Dolan-Tadros, Maude Guérin, Jacynthe René, Julien Bessette, Patrice Robergeau, Martin David Peters, Luc D'Arcy, Jean Charest, Luc Charpentier and Yanek Gadzala	
Hold You Tight	Stanley Kwan	Hong Kong	Romance, drama	Chingmy Yau, Sunny Chan, Eric Tsang, Lawrence Ko, Sandra Ng Kwan Yue and Tony Rayns	
I Think I Do	Brian Sloan	United States	Comedy	Alexis Arquette, Christian Maelen, Lauren Vélez, Tuc Watkins, Jamie Harrold, Guillermo Díaz, Maddie Corman, Marianne Hagan, Elizabeth Rodriguez, Patricia Mauceri, Marni Nixon, Arden Myrin and Lane Janger	
In & Out	Frank Oz	United States	Comedy	Kevin Kline, Tom Selleck, Joan Cusack, Matt Dillon, Debbie Reynolds, Wilford Brimley, Gregory Jbara, Shalom Harlow, Shawn Hatosy, Zak Orth, Bob Newhart, Lauren Ambrose, Alexandra Holden, Deborah Rush, Lewis J. Stadlen, J. Smith-Cameron, Kate McGregor-Stewart, Debra Monk, Ernie Sabella, John Cunningham, Gus Rogerson, Dan Hedaya, Joseph Maher, William Parry, William Duell, Richard Woods, Kevin Chamberlin, Wally Dunn, Larry Clarke, June Squibb, Becky Ann Baker, Selma Blair, Adam LeFerve, Bill Camp, Whoopi Goldberg, Glenn Close and Jay Leno	
In the Gloaming	Christopher Reeve	United States	Drama	Glenn Close, Bridget Fonda, Annie Starke, Whoopi Goldberg, Robert Sean Leonard, Will Reeve and David Strathairn	
It's in the Water	Kelli Herd	United States	Comedy	Keri Jo Chapman, Teresa Garrett, Derrick Sanders, Timothy Vahle, Barbara Lasater, Nancy Chartier, Beverly May, Kathy Morath, Matthew Tompkins (credited as Matthew S.Tompkins), John Hallum, Larry Randolph, Susan Largo, Liz Mikel, Dion Culberson and John Addington	
Kiss Me, Guido	Tony Vitale	United States	Comedy	Nick Scotti, Anthony Barrile, Anthony DeSando, Craig Chester, Domenick Lombardozzi, Molly Price, Christopher Lawford, David Deblinger, John Tormey, Antonia Rey, Jennifer Esposito, Anthony Vitale, Frankie Dellarosa, Rebecca Waxman and Tony Ray Rossi	
La fin de la nuit	Étienne Faure	France	Short, drama	Bambou, Sébastien Roch, Vincent von Kappf, Jocelyn Quivrin, Jean-Michel Verner, Jean Hervé, Sophie Chilot, Michel Derlique, Hiron Guinguin, Marianne Carabin, Valérie Henriet and Yoann Sover	11 mins long
Latin Boys Go to Hell	Ela Troyano	United States	Romance, comedy, drama, horror	Irwin Ossa, John Bryant (credited as John Bryant Davila), Jenifer Lee Simard, Alexis Artiles, Mike Ruiz, Anne Iobst (credited as Annie Iobst), Dashia Imperiale (credited as Dashia), Norma Maldonado, Jehad Nga, Guinevere Turner, Rebecca Sumner Burgos, Umberto González (credited as Umberto Gonzales), Yvonne Washington, Reynier Molenaar and Iris Prado Salas (credited as Iris Prado Salas)	
Leather Jacket Love Story	David DeCoteau	United States	Drama	Sean Tataryn, Christopher Bradley	
Licensed to Kill	Arthur Dong	United States	Documentary	Homophobic murderers; Raymond Childs, Donald Aldrich, Corey Burley, William Cross, Kenneth Jr. French, Jay Johnson and Jeffrey Swinford	Awarded 'Best Documentary Director Award' at the Sundance Film Festival
Love and Death on Long Island	Richard Kwietniowski	United Kingdom; Canada	Drama	John Hurt, Jason Priestley, Fiona Loewi, Sheila Hancock, Harvey Atkin, Gawn Grainger, Elizabeth Quinn, Maury Chaykin, Linda Busby, Bill Leadbitter, Anne Reid (credited as Ann Reid), Danny Webb (credited as Daniel Webb), Andrew Barrow, Dean Gariss and Robert McKewley	
Love! Valour! Compassion!	Joe Mantello	United States	Romance, comedy, drama	Jason Alexander, Stephen Spinella Stephen Bogardus, Randy Becker, John Benjamin Hickey, Justin Kirk and John Glover	
Ma vie en rose	Alain Berliner	France; Belgium; United Kingdom	Comedy, drama	Georges Du Fresne, Michèle Laroque, Jean-Philippe Écoffey, Hélène Vincent, Daniel Hanssens, Laurence Bibot, Jean-François Gallotte, Julien Rivière, Gregory Diallo, Erik Cazals De Fabel, Cristine Barget, Delphine Cadet, Raphaelle Santini, Marine Jolivet, Anne Coesens and Vincent Grass	
The Man I Love	Stéphane Giusti	France	Romance, drama	Jean-Michel Portal, Marcial Di Fonzo Bo, Mathilde Seigner and Vittoria Scognamiglio	aka L'Homme que j'aime
Mandragora	Wiktor Grodecki	Czech Republic	Drama	Miroslav Caslavka, David Svec, Pavel Skrípal, Kostas Zerdolaglu, Miroslav Breu, Jirí Kodess, Karel Polisenský, Richard Toth, Jiri Pachman, Pavel Kocí, Jitka Smutná, Jirí Kaftan, Bretislav Farský, Michell Turchetti and Tomas Petrak	
Martín (Hache)	Adolfo Aristarain	Spain; Argentina	Drama	Federico Luppi, Juan Diego Botto, Eusebio Poncela, Cecilia Roth, Ana María Picchio (credited as Ana Maria Picchio), Sancho Gracia, José María Sacristán (credited as José M. Sacristán), Will More (credited as Joaquin A. Colmenares), Ángel Amorós (credited as Angel Amoros), Kojun Notsu, Esther Herrera, Marisa Cabezón (credited as Marisa Cabezon), Enrique Liporace, Claudia Gallegos and Leonora Balcarce	
Midnight in the Garden of Good and Evil	Clint Eastwood	United States	Crime, drama, mystery	Kevin Spacey, John Cusack, Jack Thompson, Irma P. Hall, Jude Law, Alison Eastwood, Paul Hipp, The Lady Chablis, Kim Hunter, Geoffrey Lewis, Bob Gunton, Richard Herd, Leon Rippy, Sonny Seiler, Dorothy Loudon and Michael Rosenbaum	
My Best Friend's Wedding	P. J. Hogan	United States	Romantic comedy	Julia Roberts, Dermot Mulroney, Cameron Diaz	
Navalha na Carne (Razor in the Flesh)	Neville de Almeida	Brazil	Drama	Vera Fischer, Carlos Loffler, Jorge Perugorría, Carlinhos Brown, Isabel Fillardis, Maria Lúcia Godoy, Marcelo Saback, Guará Rodrigues, Rafael Molina, Carlinhos de Jesus, Paulo Moura, Pedro Aguinaga, Gilda Nery and Paulo César Peréio	
Nowhere	Gregg Araki	United States; France	Comedy, drama, sci-fi	James Duval, Rachel True, Nathan Bexton, Chiara Mastroianni, Debi Mazar, Kathleen Robertson, Joshua Gibran Mayweather, Jordan Ladd, Christina Applegate, Sarah Lassez, Guillermo Díaz (billed as Guillermo Diaz), Jeremy Jordan, Alan Boyce, Jaason Simmons, Ryan Phillippe, Heather Graham, Scott Caan, Thyme Lewis, Mena Suvari, Beverly D'Angelo, Charlotte Rae, Denise Richards, Teresa Hill, Kevin Light, Traci Lords, Shannen Doherty, Rose McGowan, John Ritter, Christopher Knight, Eve Plumb, Lauren Tewes, David Leisure, John Enos III, Nicolette Gato, Brian Buzzini, Aaron Smith, Sara Jane, Tre Temperilli (billed as Tres Trash Temperilli), Devon Odessa, Staci Keanan (billed as Stacy Keanan), Gibby Haynes, Keith Brewer, Derek Brewer (the Brewer twins), Stephane Sednaoui, Petro Nicholas, Peter Alexander, Brian Heinberg and Travis Blue	
Peoria Babylon	Steven Diller	United States	Comedy	David Drake, Ann Cusack	
Preaching to the Perverted	Stuart Urban	United Kingdom	Comedy	Guinevere Turner, Tom Bell, Christien Anholt	
Pride Divide	Paris Poirier	United States	Documentary		
A River Made to Drown In	James Merendino (credited as Alan Smithee)	United States	Drama	Richard Chamberlain, Michael Imperioli, Ute Lemper, James Duval, Austin Pendleton, Talia Shire, Mike Starr, Richard Riehle, Michael Saucedo, James Karen, Michael Kearns, Michael O'Hagan, Lewis Arquette, Paul Marius and Jon Powell	
Schizophreniac: The Whore Mangler	Ron Atkins	United States	Exploitation	John Giancaspro	
Shopping for Fangs	Quentin Lee, Justin Lin	United States; Canada	Horror	Radmar Agana Jao	
The Jackal	Michael Caton-Jones	United States	Drama	Bruce Willis, Richard Gere	
The Twilight of the Golds	Ross Kagan Marks	United States	Drama	Jennifer Beals, Brendan Fraser	Based on play of the same name by Jonathan Tolins
Uncut	John Greyson	Canada	Comedy, drama	Michael Achtman, Matthew Ferguson, Damon D'Oliveira, Maria Reidstra, Alexandra Webb, Helene Ducharme, Daniel MacIvor, David Roche and Shaftiq Ettienne	
Violet's Visit	Richard Turner	Australia	Comedy, drama	Caleb Packham, May Lloyd, David Franklin, Graham Harvey, Paul Selgren and Rebecca Smart	
Wilde	Brian Gilbert	United Kingdom; Germany; Japan	Drama	Stephen Fry, Jude Law, Tom Wilkinson, Jennifer Ehle, Gemma Jones, Judy Parfitt, Michael Sheen, Vanessa Redgrave, Zoë Wanamaker, Ioan Gruffudd, Albert Welling and Orlando Bloom	Biopic of Oscar Wilde
