= List of Guinean films =

This is an alphabetical list of films produced or filmed in Guinea.

== A ==
- Allah Tantou (1991).

== B ==
- Ballon d'or, Le (1994)
- Be kunko (2005)
- Blanc d'ébène (1992)
- Bongo's Jinx (1986)

== C ==
- Chemin du combattant, Le (1983)
- Choisis-toi un ami... (1996)
- Cafard, le (1981)

== D ==
- Dakan (1997)
- Denko (1993)
- David Achkar, Une Étoile filante (1998)

== E ==
- Enfant noir, L' (1994)

== F ==
- Fleuve, Le (2003)
- Funérailles de Kwame Nkrumah, Les (1972)

== G ==
- God's Will (1989)

== H ==
- Hafia, triple champion d'Afrique (1978)
- Huit et vingt (1967)
- Hyrde diama (1971)

== I ==
- I.T. - Immatriculation temporaire (2001)
- Il va pleuvoir sur Conakry (2007)

== K ==
- Konorofili (ou anxiété) (2000)

== M ==
- Mathias, le procès des gangs (1997)

== N ==
- Naitou l'orpheline (1982)
- 1993 Nuit blanche (1993)

== O ==
- Ouloukoro (1983)
- Onzième Commandement, long-métrage, Le (1998)
- Oriental, L' (1982)
- Opus 1, (1985)

== P ==
- Paris selon Moussa (2003)

== R ==
- Ragazzi (1991)

== S ==
- Sergent Bakary Woolen, Le (1966)
- Sourire du serpent, le (2007)

== T ==
- Trace de Kandia, le (2015)

== U ==
- Un matin bonne heure (2006)

== W ==
- Waps, (1988)
