= Chez Maupassant =

2007–2011 anthology television series

- Genre: Drama
- Created by: Gérard Jourd'hui; Gaëlle Girre
- Based on: short stories by Guy de Maupassant
- Country of origin: France
- Original language: French
- No. of seasons: 3
- No. of episodes: 24

Production
- Running time: 12 × 30 minutes; 12 × 60 minutes

Original release
- Network: France 2
- Release: 6 March 2007 – 18 May 2011

Chez Maupassant is a French anthology television series based on short stories by Guy de Maupassant. Created by Gérard Jourd'hui and Gaëlle Girre, it ran on France 2 in three seasons in 2007, 2008 and 2011. It consists of a total of 24 episodes of which half are 60 minutes long and half are 30 minutes. The first series averaged more than seven million viewers, which made it an unexpected success.

== Episodes ==
=== Season 1 ===
1. "Histoire d'une fille de ferme", directed by Denis Malleval
2. "La Parure", directed by Claude Chabrol
3. "L'Héritage", directed by Laurent Heynemann
4. "Deux amis", directed by Gérard Jourd'hui
5. "Le Père Amable", directed by Olivier Schatzky
6. "Hautot père et fils", directed by Marc Rivière
7. "Miss Harriet", directed by Jacques Rouffio
8. "Toine", directed by Jacques Santamaria

=== Season 2 ===
1. "Le Rosier de Madame Husson", directed by Denis Malleval
2. "L'Ami Joseph", directed by Gérard Jourd'hui
3. "Aux Champs", directed by Olivier Schatzky
4. "Le petit fût", directed by Claude Chabrol
5. "Ce Cochon de Morin", directed by Laurent Heynemann
6. "Une soirée", directed by Philippe Monnier
7. "La Chambre 11", directed by Jacques Santamaria
8. "Au bord du lit", directed by Jean-Daniel Verhaeghe

=== Season 3 ===
1. "Boule de suif", directed by Philippe Bérenger
2. "Mon oncle Sosthène", directed by Gérard Jourd'hui
3. "Yvette", directed by Olivier Schatzky
4. "Le Cas de Madame Luneau", directed by Philippe Bérenger
5. "L'Assassin", directed by Laurent Heynemann
6. "En famille", directed by Denis Malleval
7. "Une partie de campagne", directed by Jean-Daniel Verhaeghe
8. "Le Vieux", directed by Jacques Santamaria
