= Arnaud Giovaninetti =

French actor (1967–2018)

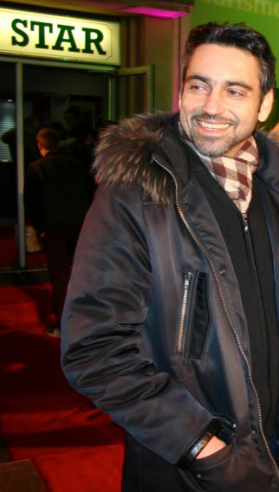

Arnaud Giovaninetti (3 July 1967 – 25 January 2018) was a French actor.

His father Reynald was a composer. Born in Amiens in 1967, Arnaud Giovaninetti was raised in Amiens and attended the Conservatoire à rayonnement régional de Marseille and CNSAD. He was married to actress Judith d'Aleazzo. In 1988, Giovaninetti was awarded the Louis Jouvet Prize. He died at the age of 50 on 24/25 January 2018. Cause of death was initially reported to be a heart attack, but may also have been suicide. His passing was a "shock" to actress Cécile Bois who starred in Candace Renoir with him.

== Selected filmography ==
- The Lover (1992)
- La Rivière Espérance (1995)
- To Have (or Not) (1995)
- Children of the Century (1999)
- Lovely Rita, sainte patronne des cas désespérés (2003)
- Au secours, j'ai 30 ans ! (2004)
- Dalida (2005)
- Lettres de la mer rouge (2006)
- Candice Renoir (2013-2018)
