= The Law of ... =

French drama television series

- Country of origin: France
- No. of seasons: 4
- No. of episodes: 12

Production
- Running time: 140 minutes

Original release
- Network: France 3 (France); La Une (Belgium); RTS Un (Switzerland)
- Release: March 8, 2014 – present

The Law of ... is a French drama television series. It has been distributed since 2014 on France 3 (France) and on Eurochannel in other territories like the United States, Latin America and some European countries.

== Plot ==
The Investigations of a lawyer for 3 Episodes.

Conceived as a three-episode miniseries, Barbara’s Law is one of the most praised television endeavors taken in France in recent years. In this production, Barbara, a lawyer by the book, does not get any rest until she is sure justice has triumphed in every case she takes; her only condition is the existence of doubt on her client’s guilt!

Also conceived as a three-episode miniseries, Alexandre’s Law is, like its prequel, one of the most praised television endeavors undertaken in France in recent years. In this production, Alexandre, a successful lawyer who faces more difficult cases in court.

== Casting ==
- Josiane Balasko : Lawyer Barbara Malo (S1)
- Gérard Jugnot : Lawyer Alexandre Laurent (S2)
- Daniel Prévost : Lawyer Simon Varlet (S3)
- Richard Anconina : Lawyer Christophe Vitari (S3)
- Zabou Breitman : Lawyer Pauline (S3)
- Victoria Abril : Lawyer Gloria (S4)
- Jean-Pierre Darroussin : Lawyer Julien Meunier (S4)
- Charlotte de Turckheim : Lawyer Valérie (S4)
- Sandrine Bonnaire : Lawyer Marion (S5)
- Pascal Elso : Doctor Bernard (S5)

== Season 1 (2014-2015) ==
=== Episode 1 : Le coupable idéal ===
- Director : Didier Le Pêcheur
- Writer : Céline & Martin Guyot
- Original Air Date : March 8, 2014
- Casting : Josiane Balasko (Lawyer Barbara Malo), Olivier Claverie (Lawyer Bertrand Deslandes), Cécile Rebboah (Camille), Joseph Malerba (Olivier Landry), Antoine Hamel (Rémy Lenoir), Jean-Marie Winling (Lawyer Solal), Nathalie Blanc (Florence Prodi), Vanessa Guide (Sandra Landry), Sophie Fougère (Karine Lafarge), Tiphaine Haas (Amandine Ryan), Franck Beckmann (Patrick Ryan), Stéphane Blancafort (Alex Prodi), Philippe Suberbie (Monsieur Morlot), Elie Tertois (Jérémy Morlot), Mickaël Dumoussaud (Quentin Salomé), ...
- Plot : Olivier Landry, a butcher by profession, is accused of the murder of Alex, a former sportsman who has an affair with his wife, Sandra. He claims his innocence. Her lawyer being gone, it is Barbara Malo who takes over the file ...

=== Episode 2 : Parole contre parole ===
- Director : Didier Le Pêcheur
- Writer : Céline & Martin Guyot
- Original Air Date : September 6, 2014
- Casting : Josiane Balasko (Lawyer Barbara Malo), Olivier Claverie (Lawyer Bertrand Deslandes), Cécile Rebboah (Camille), Carole Brana (Carole Valloux), Nicolas Gob (Philippe Sambin), Dominique Guillo (Pierre Consigny), Ophélia Kolb (Sarah Mayet), Virginie Kotlinski (Solange Consigny), Antoine Monier (Benjamin Vial), ...
- Plot : Pierre Consigny, head of a press group, decided to stand as a candidate for the legislative elections. But one of his young and pretty assistants accuses him of having raped her. The case seems lost because Consigny defends himself badly and retaliates too aggressively. Counselor Barbara Malo, a lawyer a bit cynical and rather gruff, will plead this case as the charges accumulate against her client ...

=== Episode 3 : Illégitime défense ===
- Director : Didier Le Pêcheur
- Writer : Céline & Martin Guyot
- Original Air Date : March 31, 2015
- Casting : Josiane Balasko (Lawyer Barbara Malo), Olivier Claverie (Lawyer Bertrand Deslandes), Cécile Rebboah (Camille), Natacha Lindinger (Nadège Langevin), François Marthouret (Didier Fishmann), Éric Naggar (Edouard Langevin), Gauthier Battoue (Paul Langevin), Lucie-Cerise Bouvet (Aurore Langevin), Yasmin Bau (Patrick Chauvin), ...
- Plot : Nadège Langevin accuses herself of the murder of her lover but her version of the facts involves far too many inconsistencies ...

== Season 2 (2015-2016) ==
=== Episode 1 : Comme des frères ===
- Director : Claude-Michel Rome
- Writer : Céline & Martin Guyot
- Original Air Date : September 22, 2015
- Casting : Gérard Jugnot (Lawyer Alexandre Laurent), Valeria Cavalli (Hélène Laurent), Héléna Soubeyrand (Karine), Sara Martins (Sonia Dubois), François Duval (Raphaël Menaud), Pierre Langlois (Simon Laurent), Yann Babilée (Henry Masson), Antoine Basler (Franck Mangin), Françoise Lépine (Marina Pilsky), Steve Brohon (Cyril Lavaux), Sofiia Manousha (Assia), Renaud Leymans (Marc Reinier), Laurence Badie (Madame Timbaut), Laurence Cordier (Lieutenant Weil), ...
- Plot : Lawyers, Alexandre Laurent and Raphaël Menaud are the best friends of the world since their childhood. One day, Alexander finds the body of his friend, victim of a murder ...

=== Episode 2 : L'amour ne suffit pas ===
- Director : Claude-Michel Rome
- Writer : Céline & Martin Guyot
- Original Air Date : February 9, 2016
- Casting : Gérard Jugnot (Lawyer Alexandre Laurent), Valeria Cavalli (Hélène Laurent), Héléna Soubeyrand (Karine), Clémentine Poidatz (Eléonore Vauthier), Grégori Derangère (Benoît Vauthier), Jeanne Bournaud (Laurence Velle), Astrid Veillon (Catherine Pacaut), Emmanuel Quatra (Christina Pacaut), Cédric Delsaux (Thierry Laval), Fleur Lise Heuet (Corinne), ...
- Plot : A brilliant physician is accused of the murder of his wife's lover. Alexander defends his client, who claims his innocence ...

=== Episode 3 : Le portrait de sa mère ===
- Director : Philippe Venault
- Writer : Céline & Martin Guyot
- Original Air Date : February 16, 2016
- Casting : Gérard Jugnot (Lawyer Alexandre Laurent), Valeria Cavalli (Hélène Laurent), Héléna Soubeyrand (Karine), Hande Kodja (Julia / Isabel Del Sol), Anne Loiret (Monique Payen), Patrick Pineau (Arnaud Payen), François Marthouret (Edouard Morel), Eleonore Seguin (Armelle Payen), Amaury de Crayencour (Franck Lecauze), Brice Carrois (Bastien Evrard), Eric Le Roch (Charles Verclas), Célia Catalifo (Sandra Verane), ...
- Plot : Alexander defends Julia, a woman who reminds him of an old love ...

== Season 3 (2016-2017) ==
=== Episode 1 : Simon's Law: The Man in Black ===
- Director : Didier Le Pêcheur
- Writer : Céline & Martin Guyot
- Original Air Date : October 4, 2016
- Casting : Daniel Prévost (Lawyer Simon Varlet), Nicolas Gob (Philippe), Chloé Stefani (Laure), Geneviève Mnich (Christine), Jeanne Rosa (Fabienne), Marilou Aussilloux (Flora), Pierre Poirot (Berthier), Nicolas Jouhet (Lacour), Pierre Laplace (Desplan), ...
- Plot : Simon Varlet is a brilliant lawyer, but also a cynical person, more sensitive to the amount of his fees than to the justice or to the respect of ethics. Excessively overwhelmed, his baroness commits him to defend a young priest accused of killing one of his parishioners. Little concerned by the affair and allergic to religions as to any form of ideal, Simon is persuaded that his client is guilty. He accepts, however, to plead the acquittal before the Assize Court, in the absence of incontestable evidence. But an unexpected event leads the lawyer to reconsider his point of view on this story ...

=== Episode 2 : La ligne blanche ===
- Director : Jacques Malaterre
- Writer : Céline & Martin Guyot
- Original Air Date : October 11, 2016
- Casting : Richard Anconina (Lawyer Christophe Vitari), Noémie Merlant (Katya Valle), Didier Flamand (Charles Devaux), Virginie Desarnauts (Christine), Marie Zidi (Clémentine), Antoine Oppenheim (Marc Gidoin), Rémi Bichet (Karl), Nathalie Cerda (Claire Brugier), Luc Palun (Frédéric Brugier), Julien Béramis (Richard Tchanke), ...
- Plot : Christophe Vitari, a renowned lawyer, heads a successful firm, working in particular as a consultant for the Devaux group, a leading company in the paper industry. When Katya, a young executive of the company, is suspected of having killed Frédéric Brugier, the director of a group factory, Devaux charges Christophe to ensure his defense. His request results less from a form of altruism than from his desire to be informed in real time of the developments of the investigation. Indeed, this case seriously taints the image of the company, and the stakes of its outcome are enormous for the career of Devaux ...

=== Episode 3: Pauline's Law: Mauvaise graine ===
- Director : Philippe Venault
- Writer : Céline & Martin Guyot
- Original Air Date : May 2, 2017
- Casting : Zabou Breitman (Lawyer Pauline), Serge Riaboukine (Alain), Pierre Cassignard (Christophe), Marilyne Canto (Catherine), Olivier Saladin (Lorrenzi), Laurent Natrella (Jacques), Laurent Schilling (Paul), Marjorie de Larquier (Estelle), Fabienne Périneau (Françoise), Géraldine Naliato (Melissa), ...
- Plot : After her divorce, Pauline later embraced her career as a lawyer. She passes the competition and finds a trainee position in a small cabinet in Angoulême. But, more concerned with equity than with the application of the law, it enshrines failures. Pauline was then assigned to defend a farmer accused of arson and murder, all of which he accuses, starting with his attitude and his family. The clumsy advocate is not going to rely on appearances ...

== Season 4 (2017-2018) ==
=== Episode 1: Gloria's Law: The Devil's Advocate ===
- Director : Didier Le Pêcheur
- Writer : Céline & Martin Guyot
- Original Air Date : Upcoming
- Casting : Victoria Abril (Lawyer Gloria), Julien Baumgartner (Frédéric Andro), Jean-Claude Adelin (Marc), Andréa Ferréol (Countess de la Tour), ...
- Plot : Gloria, a legendary lawyer who has distinguished herself in the defense of personalities of the Middle with success while multiplying the breaches of the code of the code of ethics, nicknamed "The lawyer of the devil" is retired from business. Her daughter Salome, a brilliant lawyer, defends Kevin, a marginal, accused of a particularly odious murder committed on a sixteen-year-old girl, Samantha. During the investigation of the case, Salome dies in a motorcycle accident. Or that is what the police believe. Gloria Mendoza, intimately convinced that there is a link between Samantha's murder and her daughter's death, will resume the case ...

=== Episode 2 : La Loi de Julien ===
- Director : Christophe Douchand
- Writer : Céline & Martin Guyot
- Original Air Date : Upcoming
- Casting : Jean-Pierre Darroussin (Lawyer Julien Meunier), Thomas Jouannet (Cyril Delamarche), Claudia Cardinale (Irène Delamarche), Hélène de Fougerolles (Séverine Delamarche), ...
- Plot : A well-known penalist lawyer, full of righteousness and infinite devotion, Julien devotes a genuine cult to Irene Delamarche, the generous and wealthy businesswoman who adopted her on the death of her parents. This explains why when Cyril, Irene's "legitimate" son, is accused of murdering his young mistress - Sveta - Julien hurries to defend his "false brother", hoping to get his acquittal and free himself Thus partly from the debt to which he is indebted to his adoptive mother.

=== Episode 3 : Tous coupables ===
- Director : Thierry Binisti
- Writer : Céline & Martin Guyot
- Original Air Date : Upcoming
- Casting : Charlotte de Turckheim (Lawyer Valérie), Bruno Wolkowitch (Paul), Kahina Carina (Malika), Joseph Malerba (Yanis), Franck Beckmann (Jérôme), Alice Raucoules (Delphine), ...
- Plot : A talented lawyer, Valérie still behaves, at the age of fifty, as a rebellious teenager lined with an inveterate player. She takes a cunning pleasure in frequenting and defending notorious truands ... If she does not care about her reputation, her daughter, Delphine, takes a very critical look at her way of exercising. Wounded by her reproaches, Valerie decides to "redeem" herself in her eyes by defending a good father, Paul, accused without proof of having killed the dealer responsible for the death by overdose of his teenage daughter. A golden record to allow him to regain the esteem of the press, the public (and Delphine ...) in which the lawyer enthusiastically enters, convinced that she will have no trouble in pleading 'Acquittal ... But the abduction of his daughter at his home by a mysterious abductor will upset the story ...

== Ratings ==
=== Season 1 ===
Episodes	Date	Ratings (in millions)	Percentage	Rank	Ref
1	March 8, 2014	3,300,000	14,3 %	2	
2	September 6, 2014	2,710,000	13,1 %	2	
3	March 31, 2015	3,603,000	14,4 %	2	

=== Season 2 ===
Episodes	Date	Ratings (in millions)	Percentage	Rank	Ref
1	September 22, 2015	3,240,000	13,3 %	2	
2	February 9, 2016	3,800,000	15,1 %	2	
3	February 16, 2016	3,911,000	14,9 %	2	

=== Season 3 ===
Episodes	Date	Ratings (in millions)	Percentage	Rank	Ref
1	October 4, 2016	2,929,000	12,1 %	3	
2	October 11, 2016	3,065,000	13,2 %	2	
3	May 2, 2017	2,615,000	10,3 %	4	

Légende :

Green : highest
Red : lowest
