= To Have (or Not) =

1995 romantic drama film

- Directed by: Laetitia Masson
- Screenplay by: Laetitia Masson
- Produced by: Georges Benayoun; Francois Cuel
- Starring: Sandrine Kiberlain; Arnaud Giovaninetti
- Cinematography: Caroline Champetier
- Edited by: Yann Dedet; Babeth Si Ramdane
- Release date: 1995
- Language: French

To Have (or Not) (French: En avoir (ou pas)) is a 1995 French romantic drama film written and directed by Laetitia Masson, at her feature film debut. It premiered at the 52nd Venice International Film Festival.

== Cast ==
- Sandrine Kiberlain as Alice
- Arnaud Giovaninetti as Bruno
- Roschdy Zem as Joseph
- Laetitia Palermo as Hélène
- Didier Flamand as the recruiter
- Mehdi Belhaj Kacem as the writer
- Nathalie Villeneuve as Christelle
- Lise Lamétrie as Annette
- Coralie Trinh Thi as the prostitute
- Daniel Kiberlain as Alice's father
- Claire Denis as Alice's mother

== Release ==
The film premiered at the 52nd edition of the Venice Film Festival, in the Window on Images sidebar.

== Reception ==
For this film Sandrine Kiberlain won the César Award for Best Female Revelation.

Variety's critic David Stratton described the film as a "engaging", and wrote: "To Have (Or Not) has the authentic feel of being in touch with the problems and concerns of today’s youth". Stephen Holden from The New York Times referred to it as a "prickly realist film" that is "superbly acted". Time Out also praised the film, describing it as "well observed, intelligently written, and finally quite moving".
