= Minka (film) =

1995 Guinean film

Minka is a 1995 short film by Guinean director Mohamed Camara treating the controversial subject of child suicide.
