= Alexandre Varga =

French actor (born 1976)

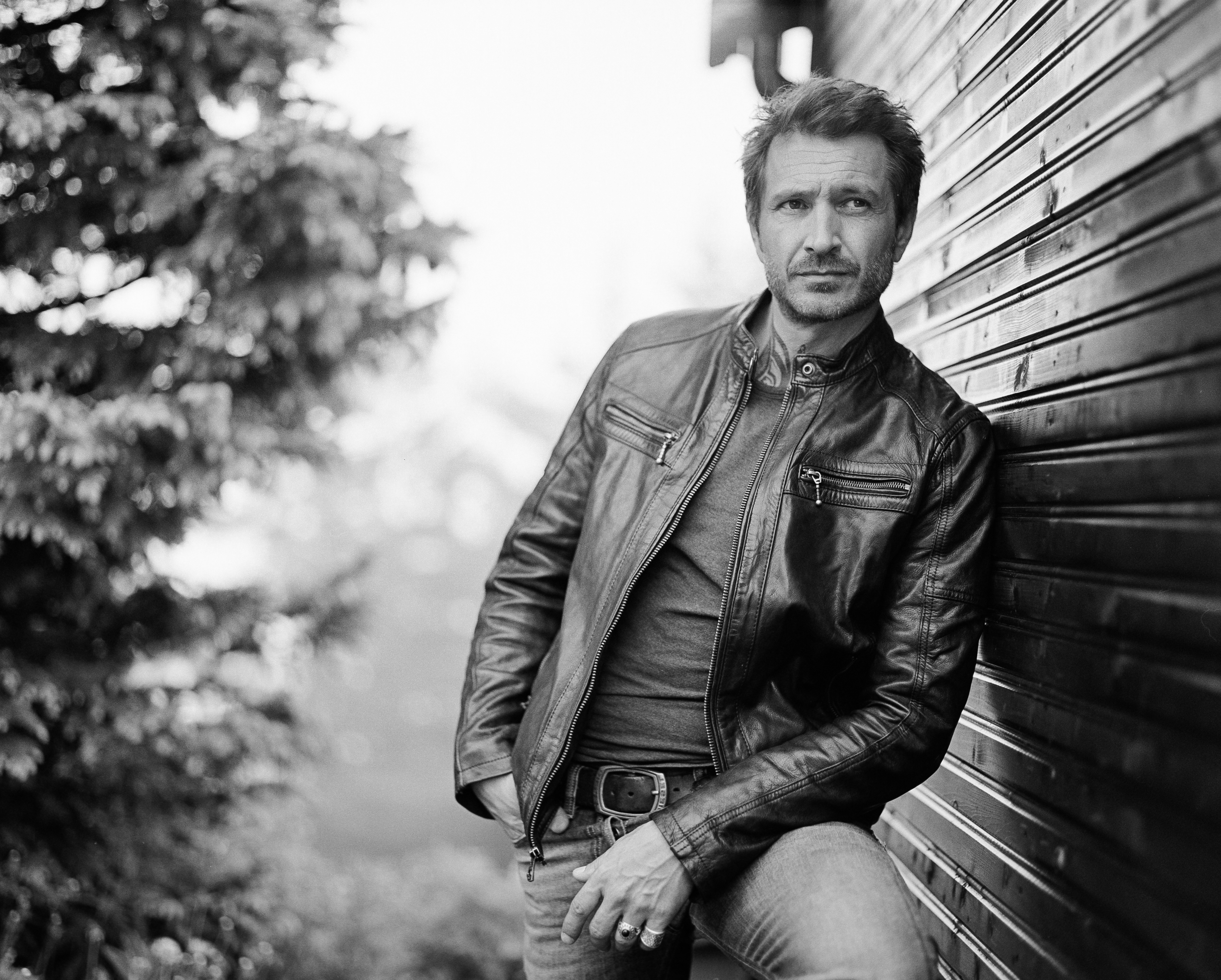
- Alexandre Varga (2018)
- Born: 7 December 1976 (age 48); Metz, France
- Occupation: Actor
- Years active: 2002–present

Alexandre Varga (born 7 December 1976) is a French actor.

== Biography ==
Thanks to his parents' work, Alexandre Varga traveled a lot in his childhood (Congo, Morocco, India, Greece). He studied acting in Belgium at 17 years and decided at 20 years to live in Paris to become an actor.

He began his career in films (Les 11 commandements, L'Été d'Olga) and series television (Sous le soleil, The Sopranos). Since 2007, he had recurrent roles in many French series television : Alice Nevers : Le juge est une femme, Candice Renoir, Cassandre.

== Filmography ==
=== Films ===
- 2002 : L'Été d'Olga by Nina Grosse
- 2004 : Les 11 commandements by François Desagnat et Thomas Sorriaux

=== Short ===
- 2003 : Blues Stop by Alexandre Kyriakidis : Joseph
- 2010 : Palak Panner by Sébastien Carfora : Sébastien Dufresne
- 2014 : Stalemate by Lou De Bausset : Pierre Bilderberg

=== Television ===
- 2009 : L'Ombre d'un flic : Igor
- 2010 : Un mari de trop : Grégoire de Rougemont
- 2011 : L'Amour en jeu : Alex
- 2015 : On se retrouvera : Gabriel

=== Serie TV ===
- 2003-2005 : Sous le soleil
- 2006 : SOS 18 (Season 3, Episode 4) : Alexandre
- 2006 : Sœur Thérèse.com (Season 5, Episode 5) : Olivier Jacques
- 2006 : The Sopranos (Season 6, Episode 11 Cold Stones) : Michel
- 2007 : Duval et Moretti (Season 1, Episode 13) : doctor
- 2007 - 2013 : Alice Nevers : Le juge est une femme (Seasons 7 to 11) : Mathieu Brémont
- 2007 : Sous le soleil (Season 13, Episode 36 & 37) : thief
- 2008 : La vie est à nous (Season 1) : Jérôme Cramerr
- 2008 : Section de recherches (Season 3, Episode 9) : Dubois
- 2008 : R.I.S, police scientifique (Season 4, Episode 12) : Victor Barel
- 2008 : Avocats et Associés (Season 11, Episode 4) : Lionel
- 2008 : Sous le soleil (Season 13, Episode 14) : Jacques Mercier
- 2011 : Josephine, Guardian Angel (Season 13, Episode 58 Liouba) : Laurent Pasquier
- 2012 : Camping Paradis (Season 3, Episode 6) : Pierre
- 2012 : Enquêtes réservées (Season 5) : Max Leterrier
- 2012 : Le Sang de la vigne (Episode La Robe de Margaux) : Antoine Rinetti
- 2013 : Nos chers voisins : Alex's cousin
- 2013-2014 and 2017 : Candice Renoir (Season 1 et 2 et guest Season 5) : Hervé Mazzani
- 2014 : Camping Paradis (Season 6, Episode 1) : Olivier
- 2015 : Nina (TV series) (Season 1, Episode 2) : Dr Delacroix
- 2015 -.... : Cassandre, série : Pascal Roche
- 2017 : Camping Paradis (Season 9, Episode 4 : Famille nombreuse, famille heureuse) : Stan
- 2019 : Josephine, Guardian Angel (Season 19, Episode 92 : L'incroyable destin de Rose Clifton) : Terrence Wyatt
