= Moe n' Joe =

- The Sopranos episode
- Episode no.: Season 6 Episode 10
- Directed by: Steve Shill
- Written by: Matthew Weiner
- Cinematography by: Alik Sakharov
- Production code: 610
- Original air date: May 14, 2006
- Running time: 53 minutes

Episode chronology
← Previous "The Ride"	Next → "Cold Stones"
- The Sopranos season 6

"Moe n' Joe" is the 75th episode of the HBO original series The Sopranos and the 10th of the show's sixth season. Written by Matthew Weiner and directed by Steve Shill, it originally aired on May 14, 2006.

== Starring ==
- James Gandolfini as Tony Soprano
- Lorraine Bracco as Dr. Jennifer Melfi
- Edie Falco as Carmela Soprano
- Michael Imperioli as Christopher Moltisanti
- Dominic Chianese as Corrado Soprano, Jr. *
- Steven Van Zandt as Silvio Dante
- Tony Sirico as Paulie Gualtieri
- Robert Iler as Anthony Soprano, Jr. *
- Jamie-Lynn Sigler as Meadow Soprano
- Aida Turturro as Janice Soprano Baccalieri
- Steven R. Schirripa as Bobby Baccalieri
- Vincent Curatola as Johnny "Sack" Sacrimoni
- Frank Vincent as Phil Leotardo
- Joseph R. Gannascoli as Vito Spatafore
- Toni Kalem as Angie Bonpensiero

* = credit only

=== Guest starring ===
- Sharon Angela as Rosalie Aprile
- John Bianco as Gerry Torciano
- Denise Borino as Ginny Sacrimoni
- Cara Buono as Kelli Lombardo Moltisanti
- Carl Capotorto as Little Paulie Germani
- John "Cha Cha" Ciarcia as Albie Cianflone
- Miryam Coppersmith as Sophia Baccalieri
- John Costelloe as Jim "Johnny Cakes" Witowski
- Danielle Di Vecchio as Barbara Giglione
- Patrick Holder as Earl Bretanoux
- Will Janowitz as Finn DeTrolio
- Brianna and Kimberly Laughlin as Domenica Baccalieri
- Jeffrey M Marchetti as Peter "Bissell" LaRosa
- Angelo Massagli as Bobby Baccalieri, Jr.
- Lou Martini Jr. as Anthony Infante
- Cristin Milioti as Catherine Sacrimoni
- Adam Mucci as Eric DiBenedetto
- Louis Mustillo as Sal Vitro
- Arthur Nascarella as Carlo Gervasi
- William Russ as Paul Calviac
- Caitlin Van Zandt as Allegra Sacrimoni-DiBenedetto
- Maureen Van Zandt as Gabriella Dante
- Ed Vassalo as Tom Giglione
- Brad Zimmerman as Ron Perse
- Rebecca Wisocky as Rene Cabot Moskowitz
- Tony Cucci as Dominic "Fat Dom" Gamiello
- Daniel Ahearn as Elliot
- Jason Betts as Ron
- Antony Hagopian as Emmerich
- Chris McGarry as Pat
- Guy Paul as Jeep Owner
- Joe Forbrich as Federal Marshal
- Qadir Forbes as Kid #1
- Daveed Ramsay as Kid #2
- Alex Mitchell as Kid #3
- Matthew 'Matlok' Rullan as Kid #4
- Brian Gilbert as Kid #5
- Kate Buddeke as Nora Minter
- Sal Di Piazza as Bookie

== Synopsis ==
Knowing that a plea agreement with the FBI would involve the confiscation of most of his assets, Johnny sends his brother-in-law Anthony Infante to ask Tony to convince two businessmen in New Orleans, with whom Johnny is a silent partner, to sell their company so he can get his share. Tony reluctantly agrees, but only one of the pair is willing to sell, and he does not press the matter.

During Ginny's birthday celebration, Janice admires her and Johnny's house. Tony proposes to Johnny that he will guarantee his partners in New Orleans will sell their company; in exchange, Johnny will sell his house at a discount to Janice and Bobby. Johnny, with few options, agrees. Johnny learns from his lawyer he will have to enter an allocution. In an agonizing decision, he accepts the plea deal. He receives a fifteen-year sentence, forfeits $4.1 million in assets, and admits in court that he was a member of a New York faction of the Mafia. This is met with anger and contempt by the members of his family.

Carmela again pressures Tony to meet with the building inspector and have the stop order lifted on her spec house. Busy with the project, Carmela has less time for shopping, cooking, and spending time with her family; she is not there to comfort Meadow, who is distressed by her souring relationship with Finn. Tony prevaricates, telling Carmela that the building inspector cannot be persuaded and that she should consider selling the spec house.

Janice accuses Tony of being unfair to her and Bobby. She claims that he blames them for his being shot by Junior and that he ridicules Bobby and does not promote him, even though he is Tony's brother-in-law. In therapy with Dr. Melfi, Tony speaks of resentments dating from childhood and admits he is mistreating Janice as revenge; Melfi suggests that her "misery" reminds him of his mother. When Tony obtains the house for her, Janice is overcome with gratitude.

While making collections in a dangerous section of Newark, Bobby is mugged by a gang of African-American youths. After they take his money and gun, one of them fires it into the pavement in front of him, sending concrete fragments into his right eye. Paulie calls Tony to deliver the news, and reveals that he is having radiotherapy for early-stage prostate cancer.

In New Hampshire, Vito, who now lives with Jim, admits that he left a family and a job in "contracting" in New Jersey. He gets a job as a handyman and wins admiration in the town by assisting the firefighter team in a rescue operation. Vito and Jim declare their love for each other. However, Vito grows discontented with the slow pace of his new life, and one morning, while Jim is still asleep, he leaves. Drinking vodka from the bottle, Vito rounds a corner on a country road and crashes into a parked Jeep Wagoneer. When the owner refuses to take cash as compensation and starts walking to his home to call the cops, Vito murders him and drives away. Driving back to New Jersey, he slowly drives through his old neighborhood, stopping briefly in front of Satriale's before speeding off.

== Deceased ==
- Jeep owner: Shot in the back of the head by Vito while walking to his house in an attempt to call the police after Vito damaged his truck.

== Final appearance ==
- "Moe n' Joe" marks the final appearance of the character Finn DeTrolio, Meadow's then-boyfriend. The couple later break up and Finn is only mentioned in future episodes.

== Production ==
- This episode marks the first time we see Tony getting the newspaper at the end of his driveway this season. The "newspaper shot" is usually featured in the first episode of each season.
- Following a love scene between Vito and Jim, the director cuts to the image of a train entering a tunnel (Bobby's Lionel) and later Vito sawing wood, metaphors for sexual intercourse.

== Music ==
- The song played in the Dartford bar where Vito, Jim, and the firefighters are drinking is "I Love This Bar," by Toby Keith.
- The song played as Vito makes dinner for Jim is "That's Amore," by Dean Martin.
- The song played on Vito's car radio as he crashes into the civilian's Jeep Wagoneer is "My Way," by Frank Sinatra.
- The song played over the end credits is "Let It Rock" by Chuck Berry. It is about hard work on a railroad as a train is headed down the tracks.

== Reception ==
Television Without Pity graded the episode with an A−. The scene of Vito crashing into a man's car and shooting the man to death showed Vito "symbolically killing his life in New England, and also showing that he has no trouble slipping right back into his old patterns," wrote the reviewer.

For The Star-Ledger, Alan Sepinwall found that the episode gave multiple characters including Johnny, Tony, Vito, and Paulie "a moment or two at center stage before that final curtain" and praised the acting of Curatola as Johnny. Boston Globe critic Matthew Gilbert found Janice's crying to be darkly humorous and the episode to have "strong suspicions about her role in the series’ endgame".
