= Mouss Diouf =

French-Senegalese actor, comedian and humorist

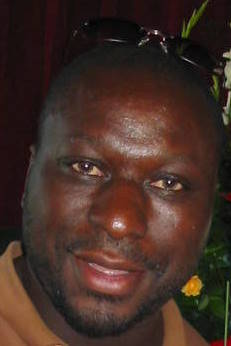
- Born: 28 October 1964; Dakar, Senegal
- Died: 7 July 2012 (aged 47); Marseille, France
- Occupation: actor

Pierre Mustapha "Mouss" Diouf (28 October 1964 – 7 July 2012) was a French-Senegalese actor, comedian and humorist.

== Acting career ==
Born in Dakar, Diouf was known for his lead role in The Beast (La bête) and as Baba in Asterix & Obelix: Mission Cleopatra.

== Filmography ==
- 1968 : Mandabi
- 1985 : Parole de flic
- 1985 : Billy Ze Kick
- 1987 : Lévy et Goliath
- 1987 : Mon bel amour, ma déchirure
- 1989 : L'union sacrée
- 1989 : Trouble
- 1989 : 5150
- 1990 : Au-delà de la vengeance
- 1990 : Coma dépassé
- 1991 : Loulou Graffiti
- 1991 : Les époux ripoux
- 1991 : Toubab bi
- 1991 : On peut toujours rêver
- 1991 : Les secrets professionnels du Dr Apfelglück
- 1992 : Loulou Graffiti
- 1993 : Toxic Affair
- 1993 : Coup de jeune
- 1995 : Les anges gardiens
- 1996 : Les 2 papas et la manman
- 1996 : Le plus beau métier du monde
- 1997 : Tortilla et cinéma
- 1997 : Une femme très très très amoureuse
- 2001 : Philosophale
- 2002 : Au loin... l'horizon
- 2002 : Asterix & Obelix: Mission Cleopatra
- 2002 : The Race
- 2003 : Méprise et conséquences
- 2003 : Les grands frères
- 2005 : La famille Zappon
- 2007 : Ali Baba et les 40 voleurs
- 2007 : Le sourire du serpent
- 2009 : L'absence
- 2009 : The Beast (La bête)

=== Television series ===
- "Navarro" (1991)
- "Berlin Lady" (1991)
- "Julie Lescaut" (1992-2006)
- "Inspecteur Médeuze" (1993)
- "Le Lyonnais" (1993)
- "Acapulco H.E.A.T." (1993)
- "H" (2000)
- "Kelif et Deutsch à la recherche d'un emploi" (2003)

== Death ==
He died on 7 July 2012 from complications of a stroke.
