= Candice Renoir =

French television series

- Starring: Cécile Bois; Raphaël Lenglet; Yeelem Jappain; Ali Marhyar; Nathalie Boutefeu
- Country of origin: France
- Original language: French
- No. of seasons: 11
- No. of episodes: 96

Production
- Running time: 52 min

Original release
- Network: France 2
- Release: 19 April 2013 – present

Candice Renoir is a French crime television series created by Solen Roy-Pagenault, Robin Barataud and Brigitte Peskine and aired since 19 April 2013 on France 2. The show was canceled after the 11th season. In Australia and Europe, the series were released by Acorn TV.

== Plot ==
Candice Renoir is a mother of four children. She has taken a ten-year leave of absence from her job as a police detective in Paris and has spent this time as a stay-at-home mom, traveling with the family for her husband's jobs in, among others, the United States, Mexico and Singapore. After her marriage fails due to her husband's infidelity, Candice resumes her job as an investigator. She has called in favors and has landed the job of head of the small criminal investigations division (fr: Brigade de Sûreté Urbaine (BSU)) of the Police Commissariat in Sète (Hérault), a Mediterranean seaside resort town, near Montpellier.

From the moment she arrives at the Police in Sète she is at odds with the local chief of police Commissary Yasmine Attia - as Candice's appointment was made on instruction by the Police HQ in Paris - but also with Captain Dumas, the person who feels he lost the job as a result of her appointment. Attia had promised Dumas the position of head of the BSU and he acted in this assignment for a month before Major Renoir's arrival, relegating him to her deputy, much to his frustration and the frustration of the rest of the team.

Renoir's ten-year career gap has also left some gaps in her knowledge of more recent police procedures, which initially lands her in trouble. In addition, her bubbly personality and soft, at times motherly, behavior, unconventional in a criminal police detective, makes her subordinates call her 'Barbie doll' behind her back, but her unique approach brings results and quickly earns her their respect.

== Cast ==
Some officer ranks of the French National Police are styled after the French Army, but are unrelated as the employees are civil servants. To underline the difference these are sometimes translated into English as Police Commander, Police Captain, Police Lieutenant (or alternatively Major of Police, Captain of Police, Lieutenant of Police) etc.

- Cécile Bois as Candice Renoir, Police Commander (Commandant de Police) and a mother of four children, who experiences family and work troubles along her way.
- Raphaël Lenglet as Antoine Dumas, Police Captain (Capitaine de Police), who turned Police Commissary (Commissaire de Police) in Season 6.
- Clara Antoons as Emma Renoir, Candice's eldest daughter
- Etienne Martinelli as Jules Renoir, Candice's eldest son
- Alexandre Ruscher as Léo Renoir, a son of Candice, who is also a twin of Martin
- Paul Ruscher as Martin Renoir, a son of Candice and a twin of Léo
- Aude Forget as Laurette (season 1), Candice's housekeeper
- Alix Poisson as Pascale Ibarruri (seasons 1–2), head of Forensic Identity squad
- Arnaud Giovaninetti as Laurent Renoir (seasons 1–2; guest, season 6), Candice's first husband, in divorce
- Alexandre Varga as Hervé Mazzani (seasons 1–2; guest, season 5), Candice's first boyfriend after a divorce with Laurent
- Mhamed Arezki as Jean-Baptiste Medjaoui (seasons 1–2; guest, seasons 3 & 10), Police Sergeant Major
- Samira Lachhab as Yasmine Attia (seasons 1–3) Police Commissary
- Gaya Verneuil as Chrystelle Da Silva (seasons 1–5), Police Lieutenant (Lieutenant de Police)
- Stéphane Blancafort as David Canovas (seasons 2–4; guest, season 5), Police Commander and a member of BRI. He and Candice had a relationship before his death in season 4
- Delphine Rich as Aline Jego (seasons 2–5), a leader of Forensic Identity squad, who succeeded and replaced Ibarruri
- Ali Marhyar as Mehdi Badhou (season 3–present), Police Sergeant Major (Brigadier-Chef de Police)
- Nathalie Boutefeu as Sylvie Leclerc (season 4–present), Police Commander, turned Police Commissary in late season 4
- Olivier Cabassut as Armand Marquez (seasons 3–4, 7–present), Police Lieutenant, from Season 7 Police Captain
- Yeelem Jappain as Valentine Atger (season 5–present), Police Lieutenant
- Benjamin Baroche as Max Francazal (seasons 5–7), Candice's second husband, in divorce
- François-Dominique Blin as Franck Davenne (season 6), Police Superintendent (Brigadier-Chef de Police)
- Christopfer Ntakabanyura: Ismael Ndongo (guest, season 8; main, season 9–present), Police Lieutenant

== Series overview ==
Season	Episodes	Originally released		Average viewers (millions)
Season	Episodes	First released	Last released	Average viewers (millions)
1	8	April 19, 2013	May 10, 2013	3.81
2	10	April 18, 2014	May 16, 2014	4.58
3	10	May 15, 2015	June 19, 2015	4.42
4	10	May 6, 2016	June 3, 2016	4.66
5	10	April 28, 2017	May 26, 2017	4.60
6	10	April 27, 2018	May 25, 2018	4.70
7	10	April 19, 2019	May 17, 2019	4.35
8	10	April 17, 2020	October 2, 2020	5.35
9	10	September 27, 2021	January 21, 2022	5.03
10	6	May 20, 2022	June 10, 2022	TBA
11	2	December 30, 2022	November 1, 2023	TBA

== International broadcasts ==
In 2020, Polish commercial television channel Polsat started production of their own version of Candice Renoir called Komisarz Mama.

== See also ==
- List of French television series
