= Valeria Cavalli =

Italian actress and model

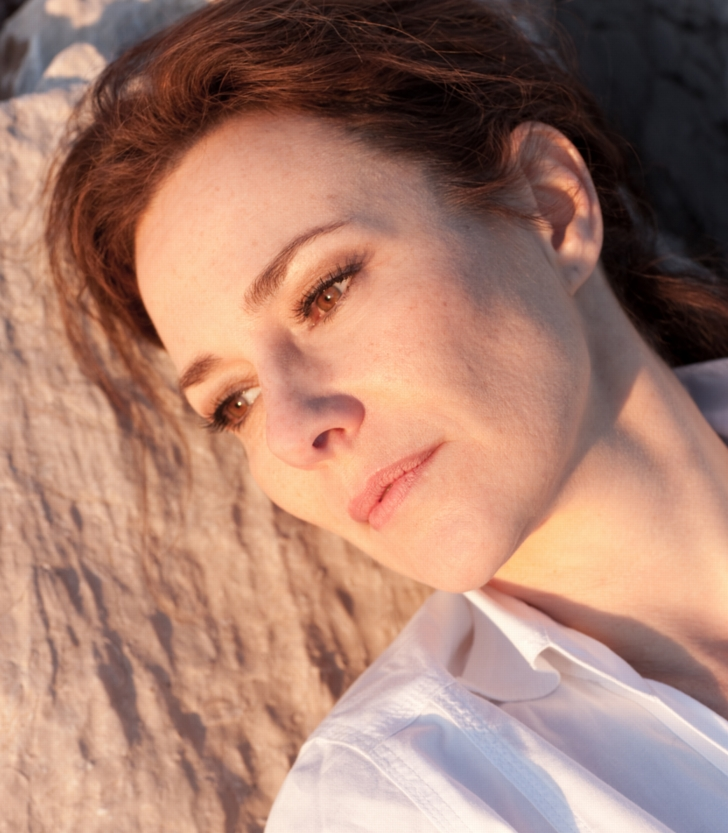
- Cavalli in 2009
- Born: 1 November 1959 (age 67); Turin, Italy
- Occupations: Actress; model
- Years active: 1980–present

Valeria Cavalli (born 1 November 1959) is an Italian actress and model.

== Selected filmography ==
Film
Year	Title	Role	Notes
1982	Bomber	Claudia	
1983	A Blade in the Dark	Katia	
1983	Thunder Warrior	Sheela	
1984	Warriors of the Year 2072	Susan	
1984	Summer Games	Teodora Theodoli, aka Teo	
1990	Everybody's Fine	Tosca	
1993	Mario, Maria and Mario	Maria Boschi	
1997	Double Team	Dr. Maria Trifioli	
2001	Va savoir	Ines	
2001	Calmi Cuori Appassionati	Giovanna	
2007	A Girl Cut in Two	Dona Saint-Denis	
2007	The Mother of Tears	Marta	
2011	A Gang Story	Janou Vidal	
2013	Le Passé	Valeria	
2015	A Perfect Man	Hélène Fursac	
2022	The Hummingbird	Luisa's mother	

TV
Year	Title	Role	Notes
1995	Joseph	Asenath	
1995	Highlander	Dominique	Season 4
2000	Joséphine, ange gardien	Hannah	TV series (1 Episode : "Pour l'amour d'un ange")
2003	Mother Teresa of Calcutta	Drane	
2005	Pope John Paul II	Teresa	
2005	Shadows in the Sun	Amalia	
2006-2008	Carabinieri	Sara de Nittis	
2008	Coco Chanel	Elisabeth Ducrot	
2009	Nebbie e delitti	Benedetta Rivalta	TV series (1 Episode : "Ragazzi di buona famiglia")
2009	Kaamelott	Aconia Minor	
2016	The law of Alexandre	Hélène Laurent	TV mini-series
