= Josephine, Guardian Angel =

French television series

- Created by: Laurent Chouchan; Philippe Niang; Michel Lengliney
- Starring: Mimie Mathy
- Country of origin: France
- No. of seasons: 23
- No. of episodes: 95

Production
- Running time: 90 minutes

Original release
- Network: TF1 (France); La Une / RTBF (Belgium); RTS Un (Switzerland); Séries+ (Canada); TV3 (Spain); La7 (Italy); STB (Ukraine); Aspara (Cambodia); PAD (Vietnam); Nowa TV (Poland); France Channel (United States)
- Release: 15 December 1997 – present

Joséphine, Guardian Angel (Joséphine, ange gardien) is a French television series. It has been aired since 1997 on TF1 (France).

== Plot ==
Joséphine Delamarre (Mimie Mathy) is a guardian angel that Heaven sends to earth. With her psychological insight, ability of persuasion and her magical powers, she manages to help people who have problems. She appears at the beginning of each mission; when the mission is completed, she disappears by snapping her fingers.

== Episodes ==
=== Season 1 - Pilot (1997) ===
| No. | Title | Directed by | Written by | Original release date | France viewers (millions) |
|---|---|---|---|---|---|
| 1 | "Le Miroir aux enfants" | Philippe Niang | Dominique Baron | 15 December 1997 | 6.98 |
Joséphine is helping Alice (Tessa Szczeciniarz), a 9-year-old figure skating girl. She would like to stop the competition but her mother does not want to listen.

=== Season 2 (1998) ===
| No. | Title | Directed by | Written by | Original release date | France viewers (millions) |
|---|---|---|---|---|---|
| 2 | "L'Enfant oublié" | Nathalie Alquier | Alain Bonnot | 26 January 1998 | 7.45 |
Joséphine is helping Emma (Jessica Lecucq), 10, who lost her brother after a truck accident. While waiting for her mother to get better, Emma lives with her maternal grandparents. But Emma wants to go home.
| 3 | "Le Tableau noir" | Marie-Luce David | Laurent Dussaux | 7 December 1998 | 8.22 |
Joséphine is helping a French teacher (Joséphine Delamarre) in a suburban high school. She will have to restore his taste for life and teaching after the death of his wife.

=== Season 3 (1999) ===
| No. | Title | Directed by | Written by | Original release date | France viewers (millions) |
|---|---|---|---|---|---|
| 4 | "La Part du doute" | Éric Taraud | Dominique Baron | 25 January 1999 | 7.49 |
Joséphine helps Simon (Jean-Yves Berteloot) to try to remove all the suspicions and rumors that weigh on himself from the murder of his brother.
| 5 | "Une mauvaise passe" | Christine Miller & Pierre Joassin | Pierre Joassin | 14 June 1999 | 7.80 |
Joséphine comes to the aid of Véronique (Olivia Brunaux), who is crushed under the debts of her husband. Having no money left, she eventually fell into prostitution, working on the streets of Brussels. Between good and bad dating, Joséphine will do everything possible to make her client return to the right path.
| 6 | "Une nouvelle vie" | Éric Taraud | Philippe Monnier | 30 August 1999 | 6.65 |
Joséphine comes to the aid of Pierre Castignac (Didier Bienaimé), who became amnesic after a car accident. Pierre thinks he is called by another name and he learns with loss and crash that he is married to a woman and that he is the father of a child. However, he and his wife are ready to divorce. Joséphine tries to find out the real reasons for Pierre's sudden loss of consciousness. What he will learn from his previous life is going to be a real shock to him.
| 7 | "Une santé d'enfer" | Marie-Hélène Saller & Hélène Woillot | Henri Helman | 8 November 1999 | 7.08 |
Joséphine is helping Camille Monin (Élisabeth Vitali), a 35-year-old bachelor, an occupational physician, has been fighting for years to ban DH4, a solvent she has repeatedly found toxic effects on the health of workers. Neither the labor inspectorate, nor the businessmen, nor even the workers, want to acknowledge the gravity of the situation. Joséphine decides to be hired as a worker to help Camille.

=== Season 4 (2000) ===
| No. | Title | Directed by | Written by | Original release date | France viewers (millions) |
|---|---|---|---|---|---|
| 8 | "Une famille pour Noël" | Jean-Luc Seigle | Nicolas Cuche | 26 February 2000 | 7.82 |
Joséphine helps Sandrine (Stéphanie Pasterkamp), a teenager who comes to spend Christmas with her little brother Julien (Adrien François) and her father, Martin (Jean-Michel Dupuis). But Martin lives with a man and Sandrine wants more than ever to gather her parents.
| 9 | "Le Combat de l'ange" | Chantal Renaud | Laurence Katrian | 8 May 2000 | 7.31 |
Joséphine is helping Armelle Langlois (Éva Darlan), who has been a member of the "Connaissance et Harmonie" sect for 3 years (after her husband's death). Because of this, she completely abandons her children, 19-year-old Simon (Philippe Bizari) and 15-year-old Chloé (Julie Durand).
| 10 | "Des Cultures différentes" | Françoise Pasquini & Jean-Paul Demure | Philippe Monnier | 9 October 2000 | 6.87 |
Joséphine comes to the aid of François (Jean-Claude Adelin), who has just taken over the farm of his father (Bernard Verley), who had to retire. He decides to reorient production and embark on organic farming. Joséphine arrives as a housekeeper, to help and appease the young man, overwhelmed by his new activity. Indeed, Mathilde (Hélène de Saint-Père), the pregnant wife of the new farmer, can less and less assist him in the tasks of the farm. Tensions arise insidiously within the couple. To top it all off, Francois no longer communicates with his father Pierre, insisting on wanting to assume everything. Omar (Mandiaye Ba), a small African wounded in the war, allied himself with Joséphine, hoping to see Francois solve his problems.
| 11 | "Pour l'amour d'un ange" | Lorraine Lévy | Denis Malleval | 4 December 2000 | 6.34 |
Joséphine helps Baltus (François-Régis Marchasson), an opera singer who has cancer and can not sing anymore. Little by little, they fall in love but Joséphine loses her powers because an angel can't fall in love. She begins to have several burns, because love is a feeling too strong for her... Joséphine then appeals the ex of Baltus, Hannah (Valeria Cavalli), who will try to reconquer him.

=== Season 5 (2001) ===
| No. | Title | Directed by | Written by | Original release date | France viewers (millions) |
|---|---|---|---|---|---|
| 12 | "Romain et Jamila" | Marie-Hélène Saller & Hélène Woillot | Jacob Berger | 12 February 2001 | 6.25 |
Joséphine comes to the aid of Jamila (Sonia Mankaï) who marries a Frenchman (Yannick Soulier), Romain, against the advice of her father who forbids her to see him again.
| 13 | "La Tête dans les étoiles" | Lorraine Levy, Didier Lacoste, Françoise Pasquini & Jean-Paul Demure | Denis Malleval | 14 April 2001 | 5.97 |
Joséphine comes to the aid of Jérôme Brunet (Georges Du Fresne), a 16-year-old high school student who lives with his younger brother on the shipyard of Charles (Christian Rauth), their father. Since the accidental death of their mother, Jerome accumulates the failures. So much so that his father dropped his arms and thought of taking him out of the school to take him to the yard with him.
| 14 | "La Fautive" | Isabelle de Botton & Sophie Deschamps | Laurent Dussaux | 1 October 2001 | 5.48 |
Joséphine comes to help Brigitte (Natalia Dontcheva), locked up in prison which must be released in a few days. She will help her reconnect with her family and son who have abandoned her.
| 15 | "La Comédie du bonheur" | Nicolas Cuche & Eric Taraud | Dominique Baron | 5 November 2001 | 6.26 |
Joséphine comes to help Sandra (Emma Colberti), who has everything to be happy. Yet, in full ceremony of her marriage, she says "no" to her marriage and runs away. Joséphine must find the reason of this refusal.

=== Season 6 (2002) ===
| No. | Title | Directed by | Written by | Original release date | France viewers (millions) |
|---|---|---|---|---|---|
| 16 | "La Vérité en face" | Lorraine Lévy & Didier Lacoste | André Chandelle | 11 March 2002 | 6.82 |
Joséphine comes to the aid of François (François Caron), a former alcoholic who has made several detoxification cures. His last one was eight months ago. One evening, he relapsed and jeopardized his career as a teacher and his couple.
| 17 | "Paillettes, claquettes et champagne" | Nicolas Cuche & Eric Taraud | Nicolas Cuche | 15 April 2002 | 5.75 |
Joséphine helps Alfrédo Paoli (Alain Doutey) put together a new show to save his cabaret Les folies d'Alfredo.
| 18 | "La Plus Haute Marche" | Nicole Jamet & Marie-Anne Le Pezennec | David Delrieux | 14 October 2002 | 7.40 |
Joséphine comes to the aid of Aurelie (Laura Granier), a gymnast whose father refuses her to persevere in this way. The angel then discovers a pitiless sporting environment. On the day of the selections for the French championship, Aurélie is accused of sabotaging the equipment of her rival, Eve (Margaux Caput).
| 19 | "Nadia" | Isabelle de Botton & Sophie Deschamps | Laurent Dussaux | 25 November 2002 | 7.89 |
Joséphine helps Nadia (Juliette Junot), a young Maghrebian woman who is under the influence of a couple (Béatrice Agenin and Yves Lambrecht) who uses her as a slave. Joséphine will help Nadia out of her slavery and rediscover the freedom and joy of living.

=== Season 7 (2003) ===
| No. | Title | Directed by | Written by | Original release date | France viewers (millions) |
|---|---|---|---|---|---|
| 20 | "Le Stagiaire" | Virginie Boda | Stéphane Kurc | 20 January 2003 | 9.47 |
Joséphine helps Jennifer (Julie Dray), a young high school mom, to take care of her baby. But the young woman is bothering to take care of Laetitia, her child. Joséphine must also train Gabriel (Gabriel Le Normand), a future guardian angel.
| 21 | "Le Compteur à zéro" | Laurence Dubos & Quentin Lemaire | Henri Helman | 17 March 2003 | 8.88 |
Joséphine take care of Marc (Jean-Pierre Michael), a car washer in a garage, and teach him to learn reading and to reconnect with his wife.
| 22 | "Belle à tout prix" | Nicolas Cuche & Eric Taraud | Patrick Malakian | 5 October 2003 | 9.03 |
Joséphine is helping Noémie (Mélisandre Meertens) who has just been chosen between more than 300 candidates to join a famous model agency in Paris. The young provincial is feverish at the idea of "climbing" for the first time in the capital. She decides to meet Rodolphe Klein (Frédéric van den Driessche), great photographer, but the task is going to be tough and difficult because Klein is the father of Noémie.
| 23 | "Sens dessus dessous" | Marie-Hélène Saller & Hélène Woillot | David Delrieux | 27 October 2003 | 9.85 |
Joséphine helps Pauline (Lucie Jeanne), talented stylist, victim of sexual harassment by her superior (Boris Terral), Joséphine must help her leave the society where she works and create her own.

=== Season 8 (2004) ===
| No. | Title | Directed by | Written by | Original release date | France viewers (millions) |
|---|---|---|---|---|---|
| 24 | "Un frère pour Ben" | Nicole Jamet & Marie-Anne Le Pezennec | Philippe Venault | 26 January 2004 | 10.12 |
Joséphine helps Lazlo (Brieuc Quiniou), a street kid. She will allow him to find a family and a brother, Benji (Antoine Nguyen). Everyone tells Joséphine that it's impossible for Lazlo to change. Only impossible is not part of Joséphine's vocabulary.
| 25 | "Tous en chœur" | Thierry Beauvert | Patrick Malakian | 15 March 2004 | 8.39 |
Joséphine helps the priest Flaubert (Thierry Neuvic) to restore L'Assomption de Marie, a fresco of the parish of the village. During a singing rehearsal, the statue of the Virgin Mary begins to weep tears of blood. The mayor plans to revitalize the economy of the region thanks to this event.
| 26 | "Enfin des vacances !..." | Virginie Boda & Nathalie Mars | Henri Helman | 27 September 2004 | 8.94 |
Joséphine helps Gaspard (Jerry Lucas) on the island of Reunion to discover his father Denis (Philippe Bas), and release Carole (Judith El Zein), Gaspard's mother, accused of embezzlement.
| 27 | "Sauver Princesse" | Anita Rees & Rémy Tarrier | Philippe Monnier | 25 October 2004 | 9.97 |
Joséphine comes to the aid of Princess, a mare destined to slaughter in a stud farm, but also to the farm owner who has suffered from uneasiness since the death of her son.

=== Season 9 (2005) ===
| No. | Title | Directed by | Written by | Original release date | France viewers (millions) |
|---|---|---|---|---|---|
| 28 | "Robe noire pour un ange" | Florence Philipponnat | David Delrieux | 10 January 2005 | 7.99 |
Joséphine helps Stéphane Ferré (Damien Dorsaz), so that he will return with his children who no longer want to see him because of their grandfather.
| 29 | "Trouvez-moi le prince charmant !" | David Lang & Lionel Cherki | Sylvie Ayme | 28 February 2005 | 8.80 |
Joséphine helps Marion (Inbar Meyer), a little girl who desperately tries to find a new husband for her mother.
| 30 | "Le Secret de Julien" | Hélène Woillot & Marie-Hélène Saller | Jean-Marc Seban | 28 August 2005 | 8.03 |
Joséphine helps Julien (Jérôme Hardelay) show his father that he is not made for studies and that he should leave him free to make his own choices.
| 31 | "Noble cause" | Anita Rees | Philippe Monnier | 31 October 2005 | 7.12 |
Joséphine helps Axel (Hubert Benhamdine) and his family, whose elder brother wants to sell the family property because of an old rancor and unspoken.

=== Season 10 (2006) ===
| No. | Title | Directed by | Written by | Original release date | France viewers (millions) |
|---|---|---|---|---|---|
| 32 | "La Couleur de l'amour" | Florence Philipponnat | Laurent Lévy | 20 February 2006 | 8.07 |
Joséphine helps Thomas (Philippe Caroit) to open his eyes on how his mother (Geneviève Mnich) and friends treat Aminata (Esse Lawson), the woman he is going to marry.
| 33 | "De toute urgence !" | Gioacchino Campanella | Vincent Monnet | 10 April 2006 | 7.84 |
Joséphine helps Bertrand (Xavier Deluc) to get him out of the emergencies he chained the guards and manages the service, without knowing how to delegate. She will also show him that his companion Rebecca (Delphine Sérina), does not like the opposite of Jeanne (Catherine Wilkening), former friend of fac.
| 34 | "Un passé pour l'avenir" | Marie-Hélène Saller | Philippe Monnier | 29 May 2006 | 8.84 |
Joséphine helps Nina (Audrey Dana), who has been trying for two years to have a child with her husband Paul (Jean-Philippe Bèche) unsuccessfully. It is Joséphine who will discover the family secret which is the cause of the psychological blockade of Nina.
| 35 | "Coupée du monde" | Hélène Woillot | Vincent Monnet | 9 October 2006 | 8.34 |
Joséphine comes to the aid of Geneviève Beaumont (Hélène Vincent), a homeless woman, to get out of the street and to have her family back with her.
| 36 | "Remue-ménage" | Gilles Vernet | Laurent Lévy | 4 December 2006 | 9.36 |
Joséphine helps Tania Fournier (Macha Méril), a former singer. She lives in an old building whose owner wants to expel all the tenants in order to earn more money. And to add to her misfortune, the neighbor of the top is a modern singer who happens to be the son of the owner.
| 37 | "L'Ange des casernes" | Anita Rees | Luc Goldenberg | 5 March 2007 | 11.15 |
Joséphine is helping Camille (Katty Loisel), an 18-year-old girl who is EVAT (Engaged Volunteer of the Army) without the knowledge of her parents who think she is in the UK for an internship. She intends to remain in the army, but her superior does everything to dissuade her, even endangering her during the exercises.

=== Season 11 (2007) ===
| No. | Title | Directed by | Written by | Original release date | France viewers (millions) |
|---|---|---|---|---|---|
| 38 | "Ticket gagnant" | Emmanuelle Choppin | Pascal Heylbroeck | 27 August 2007 | 8.67 |
Joséphine is helping Antoine (Laurent Ournac), a young factor who has just won 7 million euros in the Lotto. He will soon learn that so much money does not attract only good things.
| 39 | "Profession menteur" | Florence Philipponnat | Sylvie Ayme | 5 November 2007 | 9.23 |
Joséphine comes to the aid of Frederic Duval (Bruno Debrandt), who apparently doesn't need help. But she soon realizes that appearances are deceiving, because Frederic has been unemployed for 8 months but has not told his wife (Anne Charrier). Delicate mission to re-establish the truth.
| 40 | "Paris-Broadway" | David Lang & Lionel Cherki | Patrick Malakian | 18 February 2008 | 8.56 |
Joséphine comes to the aid of Olympe (Claire Pérot), who goes from casting to casting without ever getting a role because she is paralyzed by stage fright. And this time, it is in the musical Paris-Broadway, directed by Christopher Montfort (Franck Jolly), that she wants to enter. Once again, the trac paralyzes her. However, Joséphine is there to give her a second chance to win this role.
| 41 | "Les deux font la paire" | Marie-Hélène Saller | Laurent Lévy | 31 March 2008 | 7.26 |
Joséphine helps Fred (Jérémie Chaplain), a professional poker cheater. But the mission will prove delicate because every thousand years, each angel must be inspected, and it is Joséphine's turn. And the archangel inspector, Mathias (Thierry Heckendorn), is not the most optimistic.
| 42 | "Le secret des templiers" | Éric Taraud | Philippe Monnier | 21 April 2008 | 7.68 |
Joséphine helps Eléonore (Annabelle Hettmann) in the Middle Ages, a young woman who is at the origin of the curse weighing on all her descendants.
| 43 | "Sur les traces de Yen" | Hélène Woillot | Patrick Malakian | 25 August 2008 | 7.93 |
Joséphine is helping a couple who can not have children in Thailand. The day they learn they can adopt a baby, Yen, they discover that their baby has been entrusted to another couple.

=== Season 12 (2008) ===
| No. | Title | Directed by | Written by | Original release date | France viewers (millions) |
|---|---|---|---|---|---|
| 44 | "Le Festin d'Alain" | Emmanuelle Choppin | Philippe Monnier | 29 September 2008 | 7.15 |
Joséphine is helping Alain Rougier (Jérémie Covillault) to restore his taste for cooking and not to take care of derivatives, as well as to reconcile with his sister.
| 45 | "Au feu la famille !" | Marie Du Roy & Pierre Monjanel | Henri Helman | 27 October 2008 | 7.93 |
Joséphine comes to help Michel (Jean-Michel Tinivelli), who has just received an anonymous letter, denouncing that his daughter (Armonie Sanders) is not his, but another, because his wife (Marina Golovine) had an affair just before their wedding.
| 46 | "Police blues" | Anita Rees | Michel Hassan | 9 February 2009 | 7.70 |
Joséphine is helping Nicolas Vannier (Yvon Back), a police commander who finds himself in a delicate situation: his son (Julien Vannier) is suspected of having assaulted a policeman and is obliged both to cover him and to protect a ripoux colleague who is also the godfather of his son.
| 47 | "Les Braves" | Emmanuelle Chopin | Jean-Marc Seban | 6 April 2009 | 8.12 |
Joséphine is helping Michaël (Kevin Antoine), a young man particularly talented for rugby, and member of the MRC club. Unfortunately, he doesn't get along with the coach and the team. Joséphine will try to convince the coach.
| 48 | "Les Majorettes" | Emmanuelle Chopin | Philippe Monnier | 5 October 2009 | 7.33 |
Joséphine helps the "Sirens" troupe and their director, to set up a new show in order to defeat the band formed by her sister, who has returned to the area to take revenge. This will bring out a painful subject.
| 49 | "Le Frère que je n'ai pas eu" | Marie Du Roy & Pierre Monjanel | Pascal Heylbroeck | 2 November 2009 | 7.84 |
Joséphine helps Vincent (Bruno Slagmulder) to regain his confidence and that he can operate again. His half-brother (Tewfik Jallab), of whom he did not know the existence, comes from Brazil to touch his share of inheritance, which challenges the plans of Vincent.
| 50 | "Joséphine fait de la résistance" | David Lang & Lionel Cherki | Jean-Marc Seban | 8 February 2010 | 8.47 |
Joséphine comes to the aid of Antoine Duroc (Samuel Theis), who is accused of betrayal by the son of one of his former Resistance friends. Joséphine returns in the second world war, twice, to investigate and discover the true traitor in order to wash the honor of her client, who was a member of a resistance network led by Guillaume Servier (Fabrice Deville).
| 51 | "L'Homme invisible" | Emmanuelle Choppin | Jean-Marc Seban | 5 April 2010 | 6.75 |
Joséphine is helping Yann (Arthur Jugnot), future great searcher, who must overcome his shyness to express himself and assume his choices because everyone takes advantage of him.
| 52 | "Ennemis jurés" | Hélène Woillot | Christophe Barbier | 10 May 2010 | 7.84 |
Joséphine is helping Antoine Blondel (Jean-Luc Reichmann), a farmer who is at war with his neighbor (Jean-Yves Berteloot) who, as a major consumer of plant protection products, is threatening the bio label of Antoine's farm. Joséphine will discover that it is not just a story of fields.
| 53 | "Marie-Antoinette" | Nelly Alard | Philippe Monnier | 20 September 2010 | 5.82 |
Joséphine helps the actress Laura Calle (Liane Foly), who hides the existence of her daughter Amelie (Léa Durand) for fourteen years. When her daughter was sent back from her boarding school in Switzerland after a runaway, Laura was convinced by Joséphine to bring her daughter back to Paris, where she shot a film in which she plays the role of Marie Antoinette. The girl suffers from not knowing her father, because Laura has always hidden him from her, and is not ready to tell her the truth.
| 54 | "Chasse aux fantômes" | David Lang & Lionel Cherki | Jean-Marc Seban | 25 October 2010 | 8.26 |
Joséphine helps Rebecca (Cécilia Cara), the rich heiress, from MacAlistair Castle in Scotland. Her mission is to protect her. Her entourage thinks that she is unstable and that internment is the best solution. Indeed, Rebecca says she sees the ghost of her deceased father.
| 55 | "Un bébé tombé du ciel" | Marie Du Roy & Pierre Monjanel | Pascal Heylbroeck | 21 February 2011 | 8.18 |
Joséphine helps Charlotte (Victoria Grosbois), a 19-year-old mother overwhelmed by a baby named Amandine, whom she raises alone while working and continuing her studies. Her daughter's custody may be withdrawn because she took him to the spa where she works and left her alone in the boiler room. The manager wants to fire her for that reason. But Charlotte's lies do not help Joséphine to discover all the truths of her problem.
| 56 | "Tout pour la musique" | David Lang & Lionel Cherki | Jean-Marc Seban | 11 April 2011 | 7.12 |
Joséphine helps Juliette (Alice Isaaz), a young teenager who, at 15, is already a virtuoso violinist. Juliette inherited the talent of her father, who died when he became a renowned concertist. She would have everything to be happy, but she is confronted with the hostility of her fellow musicians, while her parents, mother and father-in-law find it difficult to understand. Joséphine will become a violinist to try to unravel the situation.

=== Season 13 (2009) ===
| No. | Title | Directed by | Written by | Original release date | France viewers (millions) |
|---|---|---|---|---|---|
| 57 | "Un petit coin de paradis" | Emmanuelle Choppin | Pascal Heylbroeck | 29 August 2011 | 6.32 |
Joséphine helps Sophie (Clara Huet). She is a young athlete of high level who begins as an animator in the Marmara Club, superb holiday club located in Morocco. Everything is paradisiacal ... Except Eric (Sébastien Knafo), who runs the club with an iron fist and who accepts badly to be imposed this new employee by the Parisian management. He is determined to try everything to make Sophie crack.
| 58 | "Liouba" | Emmanuelle Choppin | Philippe Monnier | 31 October 2011 | 6.62 |
Joséphine is helping a young Russian woman named Anna (Lara Menini) who decides to be a surrogate mother for a young couple (Anne-Charlotte Pontabry and Alexandre Varga), whose wife can not have children. But what Joséphine dreads, from the moment of the birth of the little one, will unfortunately happen. At the birth of Liouba, the first name that Anna gave to her protégée, she escapes with the baby, without money and without a home. Joséphine will try to have Anna take care of the child but the couple, who declares Liouba as their own daughter, will do everything to get her back.
| 59 | "Suivez le guide" | Marie Luce David & Ivan Piettre | Pascal Heylbroeck | 13 February 2012 | 7.02 |
Joséphine is helping four Parisian tourists. She finds herself in the shoes of a tourist guide, who gives appointments to groups of visitors at the top of the Eiffel Tower and then accompanies them in their discovery of Paris. The guardian angel discovers in amazement that, this time, her mission will concern four people. She must, corn a small group of provincials in the capital. First problem: her mission will last four days. Second problem: one of her clients does not seem to be at the rendez-vous and no one knows where he is. From Notre-Dame Cathedral to the Champs-Elysées, through the Grand Hotel, Joséphine has to identify and solve the problems of these four tourists.
| 60 | "Une prof" | Emmanuelle Choppin | Patrick Volson | 9 April 2012 | 7.26 |
Joséphine is helping Fanny (Dounia Coesens), a young professor of modern literature who begins her career, and who has a class difficult to manage. The troubles begin with Lucie (Océane Loison), a student who suffers from seeing Alex (Daniel Cohen-Seat), the boy she is in love with, ignore her. One day, the girl complains to her mother, the delegate of the parents, that Fanny physically assaulted her.
| 61 | "Un monde de douceur" | Marie-Hélène Saller & Ivan Piettre | Pascal Heylbroeck | 27 August 2012 | 5.48 |
Joséphine helps Gilles (Hubert Benhamdine), who never dared to confess to his parents that he had abandoned his studies of commerce to follow his vocation as a photographer in Paris and that he did not want to take over the family business.
| 62 | "Yasmina" | David Lang & Lionel Cherki | Sylvie Ayme | 1 October 2012 | 4.88 |
Joséphine is helping young Yasmina (Nailia Harzoune) at "Privela", a huge multinational, to sponsor her candidacy. She's a Maghrebian who grew up in the suburbs of Paris, and does not quite have the profile of the managers usually recruited by this world leader in perfumery and beauty products. Yasmina prefers to lie about her origins, inventing a father who worked in import-export and a childhood in the shadow of the Champs-Élysées. Joséphine encourages her to tell the truth. What our guardian angel ignores is that it is not the last of her client's lies. With Yasmina, Joséphine will go from surprises to surprises.

=== Season 14 (2012) ===
| No. | Title | Directed by | Written by | Original release date | France viewers (millions) |
|---|---|---|---|---|---|
| 63 | "Le Cirque Borelli" | David Lang & Lionel Cherki | Jean-Marc Seban | 25 February 2013 | 6.89 |
Joséphine helps Jules (Bertrand Degrémont), young director of the circus Borelli, traumatized by the death of his father, a trapezist like him. Since then, Jules has been apprehensive about going back to trapeze, his profession and his passion. During this delicate mission, Joséphine will also try to unravel a stormy affair since the circus is the victim of multiple accidents. What happened at the Borelli Circus?
| 64 | "En roue libre" | Florence Philipponnat | Philippe Proteau | 22 April 2013 | 6.88 |
Joséphine helps Christophe Giovanni (Philippe Caroit), who found himself in a wheelchair following a road accident. Since then, he spends his life doing nothing, and stays at home, under the eyes of his daughter, Paola (Laurie Dupont), who can no longer bear to see him sink every day a little more. Paola decides to call in a personal assistant for her father, and sees in Joséphine the ideal candidate. During this time, Christophe will have the opportunity to resume his former craft, interior designer. But Joséphine's task proved difficult: Christophe did not want to make any effort. Joséphine has a mission: to convince him that even if he is paralyzed for life, he has still beautiful days to live and a family that loves him.
| 65 | "Pour la vie" | Marie-Luce David & Ivan Piettre | Pascal Heylbroeck | 3 June 2013 | 5.90 |
Joséphine helps Camille (Romane Portail), a photographer hired to take pictures of a wedding. During the ceremony, Camille realizes that the groom is none other than her ex-fiancé.
| 66 | "De père en fille" | Marie Du Roy | Jean-Marc Seban | 30 September 2013 | 5.10 |
Joséphine is helping Victor (Christian Rauth), a former professional swindler, to reconcile with his daughter (Julie-Anne Roth), whom he has not seen in fifteen years. But the latter does not believe in this redemption and sees this reconciliation with a bad eye.
| 67 | "Les Anges" | Marie-Luce David & Ivan Piettre | Pascal Heylbroeck | 21 October 2013 | 6.98 |
Joséphine is helping Simon (Victor Quilichini), a young astronautic-loving boy, who lost his father before the latter was able to fulfill his ultimate promise: to take him to a shuttle take-off at the Kourou Space Center in French Guiana, where he was born. Claire (Lorie Pester), his mother, would wholeheartedly want to realize this dream, but she has just lost her job... In order to raise the money needed for the trip, an alternative solution is offered to the former singer Claire: participate in a choir competition to be held soon. Joséphine must help Claire regain confidence in her so that she and her choir have a chance to win the €10,000 prize.
| 68 | "Restons zen" | David Lang & Lionel Cherki | Jean-Marc Seban | 17 February 2014 | 5.55 |
Joséphine helps Bastien (Cyrille Swierkosz). Parachuted at Europ Assistance, Joséphine discovers that she must go immediately to Thailand to have Louis Mercier (Matteo Capelli), a doctor wrongly suspected of drug trafficking, released. It is only there that she learns that she is assigned a second client: Romane (Caroline Guerin), a young woman who has fled to Thailand in order to free herself from the incessant control of her father. While trying to help her two clients, Joséphine discovers she has a third: Boon-mee (Sarawut Rummayan), the 7-year-old son of her Thai guide and performer, who has to undergo an emergency operation if he wants survive ... Will she find a doctor able to perform this complex and delicate operation?
| 69 | "Tango" | Emmanuelle Choppin | Philippe Proteau | 24 February 2014 | 5.81 |
Joséphine is helping Maria-Sol Jimenes (Natalia Dontcheva), a teacher of tango with an immense talent that lies to her 17-year-old son about his origins.
| 70 | "Double foyer" | Florence Philipponnat | Pascal Heylbroeck | 10 March 2014 | 6.40 |
Joséphine helps Julie (Delphine Rollin), who seems to be in conflict with her husband, Franck (Laurent Olmedo).

=== Season 15 (2014) ===
| No. | Title | Directed by | Written by | Original release date | France viewers (millions) |
|---|---|---|---|---|---|
| 71 | "Le sourire de la momie" | David Lang & Lionel Cherki | Jean-Marc Seban | 27 October 2014 | 6.14 |
Joséphine helps Louise (Gaëla Le Devehat), a talented young Egyptologist who begins studying the Neferet mummy. The discovery of the cobra nesting in its sarcophagus suggests that this mummy is evil. In addition, many mysterious events accompany the research. Joséphine wonders if she is there to help Louise protect herself from a supernatural creature, and receives the support of Mathis (Stéphane Metzger), the archaeologist who discovered this mummy, and who fell under the spell of Louise. Joséphine will need patience to convince Louise not to lock herself in the work and to open herself to the love that Mathis proposes to her.
| 72 | "Les Boloss" | Manon Dillys & Sébastien Le Délézir | Philippe Proteau | 3 November 2014 | 6.04 |
Joséphine is helping Jeanne (Coline Beal), a schoolgirl who has recently failed in school. Watching in a junior high school, Joséphine must understand what is going on in Jeanne's life. Jeanne is harassed by her classmates, Joséphine is going to help the girl reintegrate into her college.
| 73 | "Légendes d'Armor" | Marie Lefebvre & Thomas Perrier | Christophe Barbier | 2 February 2015 | 6.06 |
Joséphine helps the Lozach family, restaurateurs whose daughter, Morgane (Paola Valentin), has disappeared for several days in Brittany, in Ploumenech. At a market on the port, the boat of the Lozach arises empty, which spreads disturbing rumors of curse throughout the village. Joséphine discovers that Marie (Marie Bunel) and Bertrand Lozach (Eric Boucher) have already lost a daughter, Elodie (Fanny Bihan), 5 years earlier, during a race at sea. She will have to manage this affair by having her powers disturbed.
| 74 | "Tous au zoo" | Marie-Luce David & Ivan Piettre | Stéphane Kopecky | 9 February 2015 | 6.31 |
Joséphine is helping Clara Lorenz (Chloé Lambert), a single mother who decided to settle temporarily with her two children in the ancestral zoo of her father, who died a few months ago. Clara has to face both the collapse of the zoo, the teenage crisis of her son and the bad memories of her childhood that beset her everywhere. During her mission, Joséphine will have to accommodate Spartacus, a new client who is a little particular.

=== Season 16 (2015) ===
| No. | Title | Directed by | Written by | Original release date | France viewers (millions) |
|---|---|---|---|---|---|
| 75 | "Belle mère, belle fille" | Guila Braoudé & Vincent Robert | Jean-Marc Seban | 2 November 2015 | 4.72 |
Joséphine helps a dance-ballet teacher (Aurore Delplace) who encounters many difficulties with the young girl and the mother of the chosen one of her heart (Antoine Legendre), as she prepares to settle down for good with him.
| 76 | "Papa est un chippendale" | Alice Chegaray-Breugnot & Pascale Méméry | Pascal Heylbroeck | 12 October 2015 | 5.13 |
Joséphine is helping Thomas (Jules Dousset), a dad who raises his 8-year-old son alone, Max (Titouan Bouzard), who has dyslexia. He practices chippendale at Lipstick, a trendy nightclub, but does not assume his job. He makes his loved ones believe he is a firefighter. Having become a choreographer at the Lipstick, Joséphine will have to help Thomas to assume himself as he is in the eyes of all. She will also have to open his eyes on the sentimental life that he forbids himself.
| 77 | "Dans la tête d'Antoine" | Eric Eider & Ivan Piettre | Stephan Kopecky | 14 December 2015 | 4.95 |
Joséphine helps Antoine (Gil Alma), who faints during a training session. But Antoine is victim of an accident. He rises unconscious to the surface. He was immediately taken in charge and taken to the hospital. Joséphine sees the firemen arrive and she learns that he has sunk into a coma. She then understands her mission: to help her family cope with this ordeal. She must also discover why Antoine does not wake up. The father seems to be stuck in his coma, although his condition is stabilized. This forces Joséphine to snap her fingers and appear in his head.
| 78 | "Carpe Diem" | France Corbet & Maïa Muller | Emmanuel Rigaut | 4 January 2016 | 5.28 |
Joséphine helps Francois Spontini (Alexandre Brasseur), owner of a hairdressing salon. Weakened by the death of his father, and facing financial problems, François seems to have lost the taste for life and thinks he has missed the chance of his life, namely directing Atlante.com, an online sales site reputed, with his best friend Jerome (Serge Gisquière). He gradually moved away from his wife Amélie (Sara Mortensen) and son Ivan (Ivan Spontini), who no longer know how to help him. In order to make him understand that he is already leading the life he has always dreamed of, Joséphine is experimenting with a completely new method: she forwards François in a parallel dimension, in which he is at the head of Atlante.com with Jerome and married to a seductive lawyer. But appearances are often misleading and this dream life is not as idyllic as it looks...
| 79 | "Je ne vous oublierai jamais" | Emmanuel Patron, Armelle Patron, Eric Eider & Ivan Piettre | Stéphane Kopecky | 25 April 2016 | 4.90 |
Joséphine helps Anne Maleval (Emma Colberti) in the Middle Ages. Finally, everything seems to suggest ... Her costume, the knight armed with a club that threatens her, until she hears the ringing of her cell phone. It is actually in the middle of the medieval spectacle of Provins. Joséphine immediately notices that Anne is very stressed especially when it comes to Gaston (Alain Doutey), her father. She did not hesitate to sacrifice all her life to take care of her father. Joséphine questions the meaning of this devotion. Anne actually seems to be trying to forgive herself for something. Joséphine is overwhelmed because she has a second client: Mathis (Eythan Solomon), a kid who lives in the house next to Gaston's. Mathis did not speak for six months. It is not a medical or psychological problem... His father is totally lost and doesn't know what to do.

=== Season 17 (2016) ===
| No. | Title | Directed by | Written by | Original release date | France viewers (millions) |
|---|---|---|---|---|---|
| 80 | "Le secret de Gabrielle" | France Corbet & Maïa Muller | Stéphane Kopecky | 23 August 2016 | 5.55 |
Joséphine is helping Gabrielle Chamant (Brigitte Fossey). When Joséphine arrives, Gabrielle is shocked: she has just learned that the child she gave birth when she was 16 is alive and well, contrary to what was announced to her. Joséphine has only one solution to solve this mystery: to return in 1962, in the boarding school of young girls of Gabrielle. Joséphine finds herself plunged among the young girls of the sixties, between their dreams of free women and their rising loves.
| 81 | "Enfants, mode d'emploi" | Cécile Leclere & Cécile Lugiez | Denis Thybaud | 26 October 2016 | 4.52 |
Joséphine helps Zoé (Émilie Caen) get an unexpected promotion: organize the wedding of Stan (David Baiot), a star of the song. But the young bachelor suddenly "inherits" two children: Pauline (Natacha Krief), 15, and Fleur Stella Trotonda(), 9, the orphans of her elder sister who died with her husband in a car accident. A rock and roll mission for Joséphine. Between the whims of a star and the conflicts of Pauline during adolescence, she must help her client to reveal herself, assuming her new responsibilities, professional and family.
| 82 | "La parenthèse enchantée" | Stéphanie Tchou Cotta, Ivan Piettre, Éric Eider & Sylvie Coquart | Philippe Proteau | 10 April 2017 | 5.53 |
Joséphine helps Sandra (Camille Claris), a young single mother, whom she surprises at night in the huge toy store where she works. Seeking to preserve her daughter Zoé (Élina Solomon), 6, since she lost her dwelling, she made him believe that it was their new home ... Joséphine discovers that the young woman conceals her illiteracy. Helped by Olivier (Yoann Denaive), the eternal student who does not want to settle down and Clémence (Nicole Gueden), an old nostalgic lady of her old house, Joséphine will help Sandra to get out of this bad pass.
| 83 | "Sur le cœur" | Sylvie Audcoeur, Mirabelle Kirkland, Manon Dillys & Sébastien Le Délézir | Stéphane Kopecky | 3 April 2017 | 5.31 |
Joséphine helps Charline (Ingrid Chauvin), a mother and lawyer who is used to handling everything. If only to palliate the actions of her husband Marc (Arnaud Gidoin) fervent defender of animals, and the epidermal behavior of their two teenagers, Roxane (Juliette Pi) and Justine (Cosima Bevernaege). But everything wavers when she learns that she has breast cancer ... Failing to cope with this news, Charline decides to hide it from her family.
| 84 | "T'es ki toi ?" | Guila Braoudé & Vincent Robert | Thierry Petit | 29 August 2017 | 4.33 |
Mélanie (Axelle Dodier), a dyslexic teenager, goes through a sorrow of love and struggles to keep up with the rhythm in school. An unexpected news comes to add to the list of her grievances: she is an adopted child. All her landmarks collapse suddenly and her life tilts. Stepped up by Joséphine, Mélanie decides to ask the social services for the name of her biological mother. This decisive encounter upsets her: her mother, who looks like her, also suffers from dyslexia.

=== Season 18 (2017) ===
| No. | Title | Directed by | Written by | Original release date | France viewers (millions) |
|---|---|---|---|---|---|
| 85 | "La femme aux gardénias" | France Corbet, Maïa Muller & Gioacchino Campanella | Stephan Kopecky | 16 October 2017 | 4.78 |
Joséphine helps Garance Martin (Juliet Lemonnier), a centenary who has just died ... A first for our angel who met during the small ceremony Camille (Ambre Pietri), the great-granddaughter of Garance. Joséphine and Camille discover that Garance, who was a maid at Cabrières Castle in the 1920s, was suspected of the murder of Henri de Fonvielle (Fabian Wolfrom), a genius of painting killed during a hunting party. For Camille, it's simply impossible: Garance cannot be a murderer! Joséphine, has only one solution to discover what happened at the field of Cabrières: return in 1926.
| 86 | "Le mystère des pierres qui chantent" | Gaëlle Baron, Aude Marcle & Julie Sellier | Thierry Petit | 23 October 2017 | 5.25 |
Joséphine helps Gabriel (Gary Mihaileanu), an angel trainee, in the middle of a summer camp of a new kind: the young teenagers present in this summer camp will have to be disconnected the time of their holidays. Laptops, computers and other connected tools will give way to real, natural relationships. Joséphine, meanwhile, will struggle to carry out her missions with Gabriel, his trainee. The young man, a big fan of love stories, thinks he is Cupid and uses his magic in his own way... Unlike Joséphine who tends to think before acting, he acts before thinking.
| 87 | "Un pour tous" | Marie-Luce David & Gioacchino Campanella | Thierry Petit | 26 February 2018 | 4.98 |
Joséphine helps Jules (Zack Groyne), 17, passionate about rock climbing, but he is forced to put his dreams aside to make a living in order to support his brothers and sisters after the death of their parents.
| 88 | "Trois campeurs et un mariage" | France Corbet & Maia Muller | Philippe Proteau | 12 March 2018 | 6.52 |
Joséphine helps Tom Delorme (Laurent Ournac). He is concierge of a beautiful hotel / casino and welcomes his two friends, Xavier (Patrick Guérineau) and André (Thierry Heckendorn), who have come to see the wedding of Ariane (Jennifer Lauret), Tom's ex-girlfriend. Arthur (Olivier Solivérès), the happy fiancé, looks like almost exactly like Tom... but with a few extra pounds. For Xavier and André, it is obvious that Ariane did not totally forget Tom. Reinforced impression by the future bride, who seems febrile and hesitant at 24 hours of the ceremony. Tom comes to wonder if he is not yet in love with Ariane. An unprecedented situation for Joséphine facing this confusion of feelings, which is further complicated when she discovers with Tom, Xavier and Andrew that the friendly Arthur is, in fact, already married...

=== Season 19 (2018) ===
| No. | Title | Directed by | Written by | Original release date | France viewers (millions) |
|---|---|---|---|---|---|
| 89 | "Graines de chef" | Marie-Luce David & Mathieu Gleizes | Denis Thybaud | 22 October 2018 | 4.23 |
Chloe (Jeanne-Marie Ducarre) is 20 years old and she decided to participate in a big national cooking contest.
| 90 | "1998-2018, Retour vers le futur" | France Corbet | Stephan Kopecky | 12 November 2018 | 3.74 |
While Joséphine, for once on vacation, is fishing with Christian Karembeu, Ismael (Omar Meftah), her former trainee, comes to find her in disaster. He made a huge mistake by returning to the past of his former clients, the Gazovski family. He changed something that changed their lives. If our angel does not help him, he will lose his wings ! Today, Stanislas (Benjamin Brenière) and Nina Gazovski (Murielle Huet Des Aunay) are no longer married and their son, little Maxime, no longer exists ! When Joséphine and Ismael go back to Stan and Nina's past, during the 1998 FIFA World Cup, they realize that Gabriel has made the meeting of his clients fall apart. Worse, this is another student who took Stan's place in Nina's life ! From then on, the mission of Joséphine and Ishmael is simple: make them fall in love. Only problem, they hate each other.
| 91 | "Un Noël recomposé" | Marie Vinoy, Thomas Perrier & Gioacchino Campanella | Philippe Proteau | 18 December 2018 | 3.88 |
Following her recent divorce, Florence (Lisa Martino) is about to spend her first Christmas without her children. A separation that makes her lose all taste in life... Seeing this, Joséphine manages to bring her into her ex in-laws. However, Florence did not think to meet there the new companion of his ex, nor to discover that his ex has accepted a job in the south and that he will settle there. She will also learn that her eldest son wants to follow him and put 800 kilometers between them ! Joséphine must go out of her way to rebuild this family on the verge of implosion since a divorce that blew all its bearings. A mission in the shape of a star above the Christmas tree: make Christmas a magical Christmas ... But above all, she will give Florence back afloat, make her regain her confidence and help her come to terms with her son, to reconnect with his passion for his former profession of pastry chocolate and why not, to believe again in love.
| 92 | "L'incroyable destin de Rose Clifton" | Aurélie Bargème & Virginie Parietti | Stephan Kopecky | 8 April 2019 | 4.48 |
In the nineteenth century, in the Wild West, Joséphine helps a young widow (Charlie Nune) to take the direction of a saloon.
| 93 | "Enfin libres !" | Maia Muller | Thierry Petit | 26 August 2019 | 3.4 |

=== Season 20 (2019) ===
| No. | Title | Directed by | Written by | Original release date | France viewers (millions) |
|---|---|---|---|---|---|
| 94 | "L'esprit d'Halloween" | Alexandra Echkenazi, France Corbet & Thomas Perrier | Christophe Barraud | 28 October 2019 | 3.2 |
| 95 | "Disparition au lycée" | Florence Combaluzier & Jean Marc Dobel | Stephan Kopecky | 19 October 2019 | 4.9 |
| 96 | "Trois anges valent mieux qu’un !" | France Corbet, Thomas Perrier & Gioacchino Campanella | Philippe Proteau | 26 October 2019 | TBA |
| 97 | "Mon fils de la lune" | Alexandra Echkenazi & Thomas Perrier | Stephan Kopecky | 28 December 2020 | TBA |
| 98 | "Haute couture" | Christine Rouxel & Alysse Hallalli | Nicolas Herdt | 13 September 2021 | TBA |

== Awards ==
Mimie Mathy has received the 7 d'Or for Favorite Actress in a Fictional Series three times, in 1998, 2000 and 2003. In 2003, the series also received a 7 d'Or for Favorite TV Series.

== See also ==
- List of French television series
