= Cold Stones =

- The Sopranos episode
- Episode no.: Season 6 Episode 11
- Directed by: Tim Van Patten
- Written by: Diane Frolov; Andrew Schneider; David Chase
- Cinematography by: Phil Abraham
- Production code: 611
- Original air date: May 21, 2006
- Running time: 56 minutes

Episode chronology
| ← Previous "Moe n' Joe" | Next → "Kaisha" |
- The Sopranos season 6

"Cold Stones" is the 76th episode of the HBO series The Sopranos and the 11th of the show's sixth season. Written by Diane Frolov, Andrew Schneider, and David Chase, and directed by Tim Van Patten, it originally aired on May 21, 2006.

== Starring ==
- James Gandolfini as Tony Soprano
- Lorraine Bracco as Dr. Jennifer Melfi
- Edie Falco as Carmela Soprano
- Michael Imperioli as Christopher Moltisanti
- Dominic Chianese as Corrado Soprano, Jr. *
- Steven Van Zandt as Silvio Dante
- Tony Sirico as Paulie Gualtieri
- Robert Iler as A.J. Soprano
- Jamie-Lynn Sigler as Meadow Soprano
- Aida Turturro as Janice Soprano Baccalieri *
- Steven R. Schirripa as Bobby Baccalieri
- Frank Vincent as Phil Leotardo
- Sharon Angela as Rosalie Aprile
- Joseph R. Gannascoli as Vito Spatafore
- Dan Grimaldi as Patsy Parisi

* = credit only

=== Guest starring ===
- Drea de Matteo as Adriana La Cerva
- John Bianco as Gerry Torciano
- Elizabeth Bracco as Marie Spatafore
- Ron Castellano as Terry Doria
- John Costelloe as Jim "Johnny Cakes" Witowski
- Tony Cucci as Dominic "Fat Dom" Gamiello
- Louis Gross as Perry Annunziata
- Geraldine LiBrandi as Patty Leotardo
- Arthur Nascarella as Carlo Gervasi
- Vinnie Orofino as Bryan Spatafore
- Lenny Venito as James "Murmur" Zancone
- Frank Borrelli as Vito Spatafore, Jr.
- Paulina Gerzon as Francesca Spatafore
- Vincent Piazza as Hernan O'Brien
- Emily Wickersham as Rhiannon
- Nathalie Walker as Lori
- Alexandre Varga as Michel
- Michel Winogradoff as Head Waiter
- Clyde Baldo as Photographer
- Anne Assante as Caterina Cella
- Doug Rand as Gendarme

== Synopsis ==
Carmela discovers that A.J. was fired from his job at Blockbuster and has kept this a secret for three weeks. Tony watches as A.J. types on a chatroom and giggles; disgusted, he tells Dr. Melfi that he hates his son. She points out that Tony wishes his mother had protected him as Carmela protects A.J. Tony finds A.J. a construction job and gently encourages him to "do good". But when A.J. resists him, Tony smashes the windshield of A.J.'s car, warning, "Don't put me to the test." Meadow tells her parents she is moving to California to be with Finn.

Carmela visits Paris with Rosalie. She reacts to the ancient city with emotional intensity and reflectiveness. In a dream she sees Adriana walking her dog in the gardens of the Palais-Royal; a gendarme says in English, "Your friend—someone needs to tell her she's dead."

Vito unexpectedly approaches Tony at a mall and tries to convince him he is not really homosexual. He asks to buy his way back into the crew, proposing to run a business in Atlantic City involving prostitution and methamphetamine trafficking. Tony brings up the offer with Silvio, Christopher, and Paulie, who disapprove. Vito has a reunion lunch with his family, telling his children that he has been working as an undercover spy in Afghanistan and that they must never speak about his return. He phones Jim, who totally rebuffs him.

Tony has already had a business dispute with Phil, who is now the acting boss of the Lupertazzi family. When they meet again, Phil is angry to learn that Vito is back in town. Tony decides that he can't keep protecting Vito and begins planning his murder. However, when Vito returns that night to his motel room, he is attacked by New York mobsters Fat Dom Gamiello and Gerry Torciano, who knock him down and duct-tape his mouth. Vito mutely pleads for his life as Phil comes out of the closet and watches Dom and Gerry beat him to death with pool cues.

Tony understands that Phil is sending a message, that he can kill one of Tony's capos and Tony cannot do anything about it. He decides to hit back at Phil financially, noting that he has "a wire room in Sheepshead Bay."

While Sil and Carlo are at Satriale's, Dom arrives to make a payment and starts making crude jokes about Vito. When he begins to joke that Carlo and Vito were involved romantically, Sil and Carlo impulsively attack and kill him. Tony shows up, sees what has happened, and wordlessly exits, leaving Sil and Carlo to deal with the corpse.

When Vito's murder is reported in the newspaper, Francesca and Vito, Jr. learn about their father's occupation and homosexuality.

== Title reference ==
- "Cold Stones" could refer to the ruins, the statues, and the old buildings that Carmela sees in Paris.
- "Cold Stones" could also refer to AJ's new construction job, which he begins in winter.
- "Cold Stones" could also refer to the "cold balls" or courage Sil and Carlo had in killing Fat Dom.

== Final appearances ==
- Jim Witowski – Owner of a local diner in Dartford, New Hampshire, and Vito's ex boyfriend.

== Deceased ==
- Vito Spatafore: Beaten to death with a pool cue by Dominic "Fat Dom" Gamiello and Gerry Torciano on orders from Phil Leotardo.
- Dominic "Fat Dom" Gamiello: Stabbed to death by Carlo Gervasi while being held by Silvio Dante in the back room of Satriale's.

== Production ==
- During the shoot in Paris, Edie Falco had the flu which rendered her voice almost inaudible. Sharon Angela had difficulty reacting to Carmela's dialogue when filming the scenes, and Carmela's lines had to be replaced in post-production with Falco recording them only once she had gotten well, already back in the U.S.
- Sharon Angela is billed in an individual credit during the opening sequence for the only time. For other episodes, she is paired with another cast member. This may be due to her key role in this episode.
- The motel where Vito is beaten to death was filmed on location at the former Howard Johnson's motor lodge in Fort Lee, New Jersey.
- Carmela believes that Adriana left Christopher but her dream suggests that Adriana is dead. In Season 2, Tony's dream reveals the truth about Big Pussy working with the FBI, and in Season 5 a dream indicates that he will need to kill his cousin, Tony Blundetto.
- The Star-Ledger article reporting Vito's death contains more text than was read out by Vito Jr. to his sister. DVD freeze frame reveals that the same paragraphs are just repeated over and over with the exception of the last. The final paragraph is unique and mentions that the owner of the Fort Lee Motel where Vito is murdered is a Fort Lee resident named Miriam Shapiro who was unavailable for comment.
- Former series regular Drea de Matteo makes her final appearance as Adriana La Cerva in this episode.

== Music ==
- "Summer Rain" by Gritty Kitty plays as Vito and Marie Spatafore talk while their kids skate at the Rockefeller Center.
- "Ouvre Les Yeux" by PM (from their 2000 album Les Petits Chefs), a French rap group from the Paris suburbs, plays during the first scene in Paris.
- "Knights in White Satin" by Giorgio Moroder is played while Tony is in the Bada Bing!
- "Back In Black" by AC/DC is playing on the car radio while Tony is receiving fellatio from a stripper while driving. That song was followed immediately by Lynyrd Skynyrd's "Simple Man" as Tony speaks to Vito on the phone.
- The melody to "La Vie En Rose" is hummed by Rosalie as she consoles Carmela at the Gallo-Roman baths.
- The ringtone of "Fat Dom"'s phone is Für Elise by Ludwig van Beethoven.
- "Home" by Persephone's Bees plays at the beginning of the credits.
- "As Time Goes By" from Casablanca plays through the rest of the closing credits. The city of Paris plays an important role in both Casablanca and this episode. This particular rendition is sung by Dooley Wilson.

== Reception ==
Television Without Pity graded "Cold Stones" with an A, praising the opening scene for showing that Cinderella Man is "the movie Carmela would rent right now" and the "jackassitude" of A.J. Alan Sepinwall of The Star-Ledger called the scene of Tony smashing the windshield of A.J.'s car "one of James Gandolfini's finest moments" and found this episode to have the most flashbacks among any Sopranos episode, adding: "The sins of the past are catching up with everyone, and the future is cloudy at best."
