= Kaisha (The Sopranos) =

- The Sopranos episode
- Episode no.: Season 6 Episode 12
- Directed by: Alan Taylor
- Written by: Terence Winter; David Chase; Matthew Weiner
- Cinematography by: Alik Sakharov
- Production code: 612
- Original air date: June 4, 2006
- Running time: 59 minutes

Episode chronology
← Previous "Cold Stones"	Next → "Soprano Home Movies"
- The Sopranos season 6

"Kaisha" is the 77th episode of the HBO television drama series The Sopranos and the 12th episode of the sixth season. It served as the midseason finale to the first part of Season 6, which HBO broadcast in two parts. The episode was written by executive producer Terence Winter, series creator/executive producer David Chase and co-executive producer Matthew Weiner, and directed by longtime series director Alan Taylor, and originally aired in the United States on June 4, 2006, with nearly nine million viewers. However, this episode became the least viewed season finale of any Sopranos season, and critical reception was mixed.

== Starring ==
- James Gandolfini as Tony Soprano
- Lorraine Bracco as Dr. Jennifer Melfi
- Edie Falco as Carmela Soprano
- Michael Imperioli as Christopher Moltisanti
- Dominic Chianese as Corrado Soprano, Jr.
- Steven Van Zandt as Silvio Dante
- Tony Sirico as Paulie Gualtieri*
- Robert Iler as Anthony Soprano, Jr.
- Jamie-Lynn Sigler as Meadow Soprano*
- Aida Turturro as Janice Soprano Baccalieri
- Steve Schirripa as Bobby Baccalieri
- Frank Vincent as Phil Leotardo
- Ray Abruzzo as Little Carmine Lupertazzi

* = credit only

=== Guest starring ===
- Julianna Margulies as Julianna Skiff
- Tom Aldredge as Hugh De Angelis
- Gregory Antonacci as Butch DeConcini
- Denise Borino as Ginny Sacrimoni
- Cara Buono as Kelli Lombardo Moltisanti
- Max Casella as Benny Fazio
- Geraldine LiBrandi as Patty Leotardo
- Arthur Nascarella as Carlo Gervasi
- Dania Ramirez as Blanca Selgado
- Matt Servitto as Agent Harris
- Suzanne Shepherd as Mary De Angelis
- Lenny Venito as James "Murmur" Zancone
- Angelo Massagli as Bobby Baccalieri, Jr.
- Miryam Coppersmith as Sophia Baccalieri
- John "Cha Cha" Ciarcia as Albie Cianflone
- John Bianco as Gerry Torciano
- Taleb Adlah as Ahmed
- Donnie Keshawarz as Muhammad
- Patty McCormack as Liz La Cerva
- Jeffrey M Marchetti as Peter "Bissell" LaRosa
- Brianna and Kimberly Laughlin as Domenica Baccalieri
- Aasif Mandvi as Dr. Abu Bilal
- Arabella Field as Amy
- Matilda Downey as Yaryna
- Anthony Garcia as Teenager #1
- Kelvin Santos as Teenager #2
- Jonathan Marino Cuellar as Teenager #3
- Kadin and Kobi George as Hector Selgado
- Samuel Smith as Orderly
- Eric Zuckerman as Scott

== Synopsis ==
Carlo disposes of Fat Dom's head in a sewer drain in Connecticut, while Benny blows up Phil's wire room. By chance, Phil is walking towards the place with a woman when it explodes, and they are blown onto their backs.

At a sit-down mediated by Little Carmine, Phil and Tony agree to end hostilities. However, things go wrong when Carmine thoughtlessly mentions Phil's murdered brother Billy; Phil, enraged, insults Tony and Carmine before storming off. Phil then discusses his next step with his capos Gerry, Butchie DeConcini, and Albie Cianflone. When Phil rejects Butchie's suggestion to kill Tony, Butchie suggests picking "somebody over there." Later, Agent Harris quietly tells Tony that his sources in the FBI are saying that someone in his organization may be in danger of retaliation by the Lupertazzi family.

Phil has a heart attack. At first, Tony finds joy in his misfortune but later surprises the New York mobsters by visiting Phil at the hospital. Tony shares with Phil the spiritual knowledge that came to him in his coma, tells him to take his time recovering and enjoy his grandchildren and the good things in life, and says that later there will be enough for everyone. Phil is left emotional by the scene, silently tearing up.

Tony completes the Jamba Juice deal and tries to revive his relationship with Julianna, only to learn that she is now Christopher's comare, having met him at an AA meeting. The two relapse into drug use, telling themselves that they can integrate the drugs into their lives. Chris tells Tony and the crew he is seeing a black girl named Kaisha, who he prefers not to introduce to them. Eventually, he tells Tony the truth in order to prevent him from finding out that he is using drugs again. Tony acts indifferent, but to Dr. Melfi he expresses his anger that his reward for marital fidelity is Chris's relationship with the woman he desired for himself.

Carmela is thinking about Adriana again because of her dream in Paris, and because her mother, Liz La Cerva, has tried to kill herself in despair. Carmela wants Tony to hire a private investigator to track Adriana down; he tells Silvio to lean on the building inspector so that she can work again on the spec house. When the stop order is lifted, Carmela immediately realizes that it is Tony's work and thanks him profusely. She throws away the detective agency's business card.

Bobby visits Junior Soprano at his mental care facility and returns his Christmas gift, an envelope of money, saying he cannot accept it after Junior shot Tony. Junior says that he is "mounting [his] case" with the help of an ex-lawyer, another patient in the institution.

At the construction site, A.J. meets Blanca Selgado, a Dominican woman who works in the office; she is 10 years older than him and has a toddler named Hector. On their first date, while they watch television in her apartment, a group of young men begin playing loud music outside, waking Hector. She says her ex-boyfriend used to beat the youths. A.J. resolves the dispute by bribing them with a Gary Fisher mountain bike given by his parents. He and Blanca then have sex.

The Baccalieris, DeAngelis, and Moltisantis join the Sopranos at their home for Christmas Eve, although Meadow has stayed in California. A.J. arrives with Blanca and Hector. His parents welcome her but, aside, murmur their reservations. Carmela takes Tony's hand; the Christmas tree is piled high with gifts; Christmas music is playing; almost the entire extended family is gathered, it seems, peacefully.

== First appearances ==
- Blanca Selgado: A.J.'s new Dominican girlfriend.
- Butch DeConcini: a Lupertazzi family capo who is in favor of most aggressive action against the Jersey crime family, such as the murder of someone close to Tony or Tony himself.

== Production ==
- "Sentimental Journey" was the working title for this episode.
- The episode is dedicated to the director John Patterson, who directed every season finale for the first five seasons and worked regularly on the series, but died after its fifth season.
- The exploding storefront is an actual location in the Queens neighborhood of Ridgewood on Fresh Pond Road (one of the two main local shopping streets).

== Music ==
- The episode opens and closes with The Rolling Stones song "Moonlight Mile."
- "Precious" by Pretenders plays when A.J. gets Blanca's phone number at the bar.
- The three street youths play the Latin hip-hop songs "Culo" and "Toma" by Pitbull.
- The opening theme music to Alfred Hitchcock's Vertigo by Bernard Herrmann is played during the montage of Chris and Julianna using heroin again and watching the movie at the theater.
- The song playing at the Bada Bing! when Tony learns of Phil's heart attack is a version of "The Little Drummer Boy" by Joan Jett and the Blackhearts.
- Frank Sinatra's "The Christmas Waltz" as well as his version of "Silent Night" is playing during the episode's final moments.

== Reception ==
The episode had an estimated 8.9 million viewers on its premiere, the fewest viewers for any season finale of the series in contrast to the season 4 finale that had over 12 million. Los Angeles Times critic Scott Collins noted: "...disappointed fans singled out the Sunday finale as particularly uneventful."

Critics also had mild reviews of the episode. Television Without Pity graded the episode with a B. The review was critical of the scene of A.J. at Blanca's apartment, namely that A.J. peacefully giving up his bike to make loiterers leave was unbelievable and Blanca sounded "weird" by saying that A.J. shared a birthday with Jesse Ventura. Regarding the final scene of the Soprano family Christmas party, Television Without Pity compared it to a "dream sequence" and observed a "weird, awkward tableau of the new Soprano family."

For The Star-Ledger, Alan Sepinwall called the episode "meandering, closure-light" and lacking in plot or character development. Lisa Schwarzbaum of Entertainment Weekly remarked that the episode was "[n]ot so much a season finale as a graceful recapitulation of themes before a six-month intermission".

Internal medicine physician Marc Siegel fact-checked the medical scenes of this episode for the Los Angeles Times, explaining that Valerian tea cannot substitute for cough medicine.
