= Mama Keïta =

Guinean filmmaker (born 1956)

- Mama Keïta
- Born: 6 August 1956 (age 70); Dakar, Senegal
- Citizenship: Guinean and French
- Education: law study at Université de Paris-I
- Occupations: Film director, screen writer and film producer
- Writing career
- Notable works: Ragazzi (1991), Le onzième commandement (1998), L'Absence (2009)

Mama Keïta (also Mama Kéïta and Mama Keita, born in 1956) is a Guinean screen writer, film director, and film producer. After studying law at the Paris 1 Panthéon-Sorbonne University, he started out as a screen writer, but in 1981 turned to directing short films and in 1991 his first feature film Ragazzi.

== Filmography ==
Keïta's films include:

Year	Film	Genre	Role	Duration (min)
1981	Le Cafard	Short	Film director	
1982	L'Oriental	Short	Film director	
1985	Opus 1	Short	Film director	
1988	Waps	Short	Film director	
1991	Ragazzi	Romantic comedy feature	Film director, screen writer, co-producer	85 m
1993	1993 Nuit blanche	Short	Film director	
1996	Choisis-toi un ami...	Drama fiction feature	Film director	90 m
1997	Le Onzième Commandement (11ème commandement, Le)	Fiction feature	Film director, screen writer	80 m
1998	David Achkar, Une Étoile filante	Portrait documentary	Film director	21 m
2003	Le Fleuve	Comedy feature	Film director	90 m
2004	Le Transfert	Short	Film director	
2004	Sur la route du fleuve	Documentary	Film director	52 m
2007	Le sourire du serpent	Thriller feature	Film director, screen writer	90 m
2009	L'Absence	Drama feature	Film director, screen writer, producer	84 m
2009	One More Vote for Obama	Drama short	Director	14 m
2009	One More Vote for Obama, part of Afrique vue par… (L’)	Drama short compilation	Director	100 m in total
2011	Le Bonheur d'Elza by Mariette Monpierre	Drama feature	Screen writer, co-producer	79 m
2019	A des Miles du paradis	Documentary feature, portrait of Miles Davis	Film director, screen writer, producer	100 m

== Awards ==
Keïta's films won the following distinctions:

Film	Festival	Award
Choisis-toi un ami..., 1996	49th Locarno Film Festival 1996	CICAE Jury Prize
Le Fleuve, 2002	Festival Paris Cinéma 2003	Prix de la Presse
L’Absence, 2009	FESPACO 2009 (Burkina Faso)	Best Screenplay
