= Stéphane Blancafort =

French actor and director

- Born: May 6, 1970 (age 55)
- Occupations: Actor, director
- Notable work: Vilaine; Mea Culpa; Tandem; Candice Renoir; Cassandre

Stéphane Blancafort (born 6 May 1970) is a French actor and director.

== Biography ==
Stéphane Blancafort discovered theatre because of his mother and sport because of his father, both of whom were teachers. He was highly engaged in sport, but eventually turned to theatre and, in 1991, joined the Conservatoire de Montpellier, and later the Conservatoire de Bordeaux.

In 1996, Blancafort created a theatre company, known as Le théâtre du Gaucher, in Pau, Pyrénées-Atlantiques. He directed scenes from several pieces, including those of Pierre Beaumarchais, Yasmina Reza, and Marcel Pagnol.

He has also had a career in television, in series like Plus belle la vie and Mafiosa, and in cinema with his work in Mea Culpa and Vilaine.

In 2014, he received a recurring role on the television series Candice Renoir as the character David Canovas, and in 2016 he was cast for the role of Captain Paul Marchal in Tandem. Together, the series have amassed over 5,000,000 television views.
