= Le sourire du serpent =

- Directed by: Mama Kéïta
- Screenplay by: Mama Kéïta
- Produced by: Renaissance Productions
- Starring: Valentina Sauca, Mouss Diouf, Karim Seghair
- Cinematography: Rémi Mazet
- Edited by: Miriame Chamekh
- Music by: Miriame Chamekh
- Release date: 2006
- Running time: 84'
- Countries: France; Guinea

Le sourire du serpent is a 2006 French film.

== Synopsis ==
A cold winter night. A gloomy, dimly-lit street in the outskirts of the city, surrounded by old factories. It is getting late, and Marion, a prostitute who works just outside the city, decides to go back downtown. But she is unable to, the last bus doesn't arrive, its driver has been murdered. She is about to lose patience when Adama, a man in his thirties, reaches the bus stop. Both are trapped in this no man's land. The danger lurking in the dark shatters their nerves. Could Adama, an illegal immigrant, be the killer?
