= Mohamed Camara (film director) =

Guinean film director and actor

- Born: 1959 (age 66–67); Conakry, Guinea
- Other name: Mohamed Kamara
- Citizenship: Guinean
- Education: Atelier Blanche Salant
- Occupations: film director, actor
- Years active: 1986–present
- Known for: his performance as Ousmane in French in Action
- Awards: Grand Jury Award for Outstanding Foreign Narrative Feature at L.A. Outfest

Mohamed Camara (French pronunciation: [mɔ.a.mɛd kamaʁa]; born 1959 in Conakry) is a Guinean film director and actor based in France. He studied at the Atelier Blanche Salant in Paris. He has explored controversial topics in his films such as incest (Denko), child suicide (Minka) and homosexuality (Dakan). 1997's Dakan has been called the first film on homosexuality by a Black African.

Camara has won several international awards for his films, including the Grand Jury Award for Outstanding Foreign Narrative Feature at L.A. Outfest for Dakan.

In North America, Camara is perhaps best known for his performance as Ousmane in the wildly popular educational series French in Action.

== Filmography ==
=== Actor ===
Year	Film
1988	The House of Smiles
1994	Neuf mois
1997	100% Arabic
1997	Dakan

=== Director ===
Year	Film
1993	Denko
1994	Minka
1997	Dakan
