= Cécile Bois =

French actress

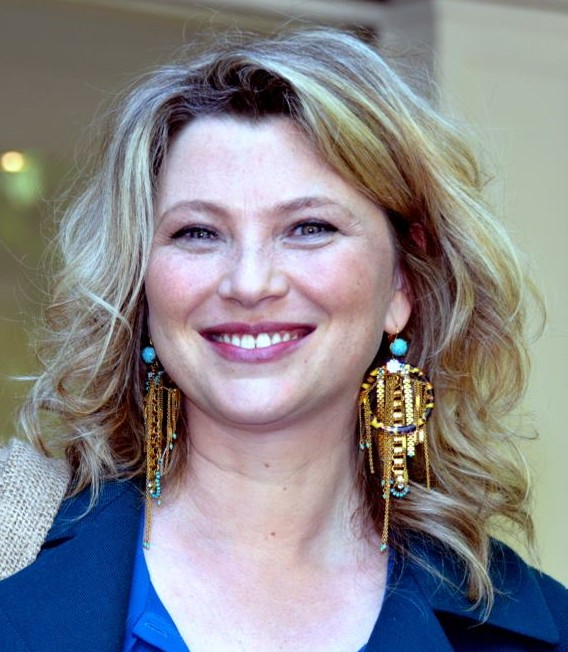
- Cécile Bois in April 2016
- Born: Cécile Bois; 26 December 1971 (age 54); Lormont, France
- Education: Conservatoire de Bordeaux
- Occupation: Actress
- Years active: 1989–present
- Spouse: Jean-Pierre Michaël (m. 2016)
- Children: 2

Cécile Bois (born 1971) is a French TV, stage, and film actress. She came to national attention when she was cast, aged 24, in the title role of Robert Hossein's play Angélique, Marquise des Anges. In recent years, she is most known for her turn in the title role on the French TV crime drama, Candice Renoir.

== Early life and education ==
Cécile Bois was born in Talence and grew up in Lormont, Bassens, and Bordeaux. Her father was a teacher and her mother worked as an adviser for the Ministry of Youth and Sports, and Bois has a younger sister.

Bois wanted to be an actress since the age of 4. While at school Bois joined an amateur theatre troupe. The following year she entered the Conservatoire de Bordeaux, which she subsequently left to join another theatre group named "Le théâtre en vrac".

At age 19 Bois moved to Paris and began training at l'École de la rue Blanche. It was during this time that she met her future agent Chafika.

== Career ==
Bois came to national attention playing Angélique in Robert Hossein's 1995 play Angélique, Marquise des Anges, based on the novels by Anne Golon. She performed the role in 130 appearances at the Palais des Sports.

Bois has starred in films such as Germinal, Dakan, Ça n'empêche pas les sentiments, Lucky Punch, le montreur de boxe, and Le roi danse, but she is best known for her television roles. She starred as Agnes in the TV series Navarro, as the female lead in the 2007 TV film Agatha contre Agatha. and alongside Bruno Wolkowitch and Florence Pernel in the 2010 television film Le Désamour, which was directed by Daniel Janneau for France 3.

Bois is best known for playing the title role in the France 2 detective drama-comedy series Candice Renoir, which aired from 2013 to 2023.

Bois also played the lead role in the television drama series Gloria, a French remake of the 2017 Welsh series Keeping Faith, released on 17 February 2022. In 2025 she started starring in the new France 2 TV comedy drama Made in France.

== Personal life ==
Since 2016 Bois has been in a relationship with fellow actor Jean-Pierre Michaël, with whom she has two daughters.

== Filmography ==
=== Cinéma ===
- 1992: Promenades d'été
- 1993: Germinal
- 1993: La Place d'un autre
- 1995: Lucky Punch, le montreur de boxe
- 1996: Dakan
- 1998: Ça n'empêche pas les sentiments
- 2000: Le roi danse
- 2000: Le Roman de Lulu
- 2001: La Grande Vie !
- 2004: Les Mots bleus
- 2005: Une belle histoire
- 2009: Trésor
- 2023 : Like a Prince

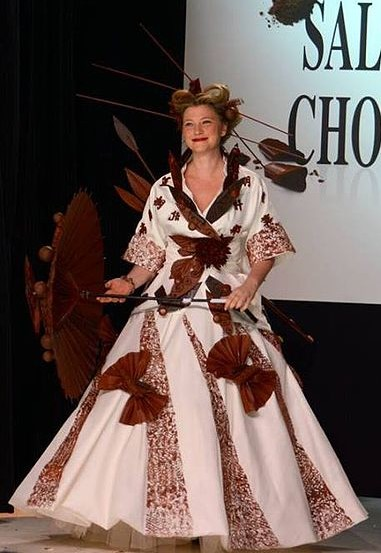
Cécile Bois in 2013, at the Salon du Chocolat fashion show.

=== Television ===
- 1993: Le Chasseur de la nuit
- 1995: Navarro
- 1995: Fils de flic
- 1996: Les Alsaciens ou les Deux Mathilde
- 1997: Une soupe aux herbes sauvages
- 1997: La Maison d'Alexina
- 1998: La Femme de l'Italien
- 1998: Les monos (1 episode)
- 2000: Maigret as Miss Vague (1 episode)
- 2001: Résurrection
- 2001: Mathieu Corot as Diane (1 episode)
- 2002: Femmes de loi as Vanessa (1 episode)
- 2003: Une place parmi les vivants as Sabine
- 2003: Je serai toujours près de toi as Guilaine
- 2003: Joséphine, ange gardien as Sandrine (2 episode)
- 2004: Ariane Ferry as Ariane Ferry
- 2005: Sauveur Giordano as Caroline Lucas (1 episode)
- 2005: Une famille formidable as Marie-Sophie (1 episode)
- 2006: Agathe contre Agathe as Agathe Verdier
- 2006: Tombé du ciel as Florence
- 2006: Marie Besnard, l'empoisonneuse as Maître Chantal Jacquemin
- 2007: Adresse inconnue as Isabelle Chanbrier(1 episode)
- 2007: La vie à une as Elisa Moncea
- 2007: Camping Paradis as Julie (1 episode)
- 2007: Cellule Identité as Frédéric
- 2009: Vive les Vacances ! as Cécile (6 episodes)
- 2009: Aveugle, mais pas trop as Ninon
- 2009: Alice Nevers, le juge est une femme as Stéphanie Moreau (1 episode)
- 2010: Le Désamour as Charlotte
- 2010: Accusé Mendès France as Epouse lepretr
- 2011: Merci Patron as Nikki
- 2013-present: Candice Renoir as Candice Renoir
- 2014: Richelieu, la Pourpre et le Sang as Anne d'Autriche
- 2015: Envers et contre tous as Audrey
- 2017: Meurtres à Sarlat as Claire Dalmas (1 episode)
- 2022: Gloria
- 2023: Drops of God
- 2023: Goût du Crime (Taste of Crime)
- 2025: Made in France

== Stage ==
- 1990: Zapping, solitude, parloir
- 1991: Volpon
- 1995: Angélique, marquise des anges
- 2001: La Souricière d'Agatha Christie
- 2008: Les Demoiselles d'Avignon
