= Denko =

- Directed by: Mohamed Camara
- Written by: Mohamed Camara
- Produced by: Dominique Andreani
- Cinematography: Mathieu Vaudepied
- Edited by: Agnes Bruckert
- Music by: Mamady Mansare
- Production company: Movimento Productions
- Release date: 1993
- Running time: 18 minutes
- Countries: Guinea; France

Denko is a 1993 short drama film directed by Guinean film maker Mohamed Camara. The story involves incest between a mother and son. The film won the Grand Prix at the Clermont-Ferrand International Short Film Festival, the award for Best Short film at the Fribourg International Film Festival and the Golden Danzante award at the Huesca Film Festival.

== Synopsis ==
Mariama and her blind son Bilaly are shunned by their neighbours. When Mariama rescues an albino man, Samba, from drowning, she discovers that he is a healer and can cure her son's blindness. In order for him to do this, Mariama must commit incest with Bilaly.
