= Roland Tec =

American writer and movie director

Roland Tec is an American writer and movie director. His 1997 film All the Rage is widely considered a hallmark of the Queer Indie Film Movement of the '90s for what was then its unprecedented critical view of A-list gay male culture of perfection.

== Biography ==
=== Early life and education ===
Tec was raised in Westport, Connecticut, by his Jewish-Polish and Holocaust-survivor parents Leon and Nechama Tec. His father was a child psychiatrist. His mother is a sociology professor at the University of Connecticut at Stamford and the author of Defiance: The Bielski Partisans, which was later adapted into the 2008 film Defiance.

As a student at Harvard and Brandeis, Tec studied music composition with composers Eric Chasalow, David Lewin, John Corigliano, and Peter Lieberson.

=== Career ===
Prior to his work in film, Tec was the founder and artistic director of New Opera Theatre Ensemble, a Boston-based improvisational opera company which mounted new work in such venues as The Boston Public Library and The Charles Hayden Planetarium at Museum of Science, Boston.

All the Rage was seen by John Tilley at the 1997 Los Angeles gay and lesbian film festival, Outfest, and brought to Mike Thomas, who with Marcus Hu had founded Strand Releasing.

Prior to his work in film, Tec had several of his musical compositions performed, among them operas, vocal music and chamber music.

After his move to New York City in 2000, Tec continued his work in theatre, mounting shows such as Bodily Function, which was produced at The Culture Project, and The Wreck Behind Us at the Duplex.

In 2007, Tec co-produced Edward Zwick's film Defiance, an adaptation of the book by the same name written by Tec's mother.

Tec's film We Pedal Uphill is a tapestry of Post-9/11 America, released in 2008 by Cinevolve Studios.

== Filmography ==
- 1995: Hooking Up, composer, director, producer, writer
- 1997: All the Rage, composer, director, producer, writer
- 2001: Monsoon Wedding, New York Production Liaison
- 2008: We Pedal Uphill, composer, director, producer, writer
- 2008: Defiance, co-producer
