= All the Rage (1997 film) =

- Film poster
- Directed by: Roland Tec
- Written by: Roland Tec
- Produced by: sashanna forbes
- Starring: John-Michael Lander
- Narrated by: unknown
- Cinematography: Gretchen Widmer
- Edited by: Jon Altschuler
- Music by: Paul Outlaw; Roland Tec
- Distributed by: Strand Releasing
- Release date: June 11, 1997
- Running time: 105 minutes
- Country: United States
- Language: English
- Budget: 100000

All the Rage is a 1997 American film by New York City-based writer Roland Tec. It was released theatrically in the U.S., was widely reviewed in numerous publications and continues to be a top-grossing film among gay-themed titles on Netflix and Amazon.

All the Rage had its world premiere at the Castro Theatre during the San Francisco International Film Festival of 1997, after which it was released theatrically in the U.S. by Jour de Fete, a division of Rialto Pictures. In 2001, Strand Releasing brought the film out on DVD; in 2003, it was released internationally by Media Luna, GHB.

Hailed by Los Angeles Times film critic Kevin Thomas as "One of the sharpest, sexiest and most amusing satires of gay life and values ever filmed," it is widely considered a hallmark of the Queer Independent Film movement of the late 1990s. This unique aspect of the film was highlighted in one of its first reviews by Dennis Harvey, who wrote about the film for Variety.

The film features music by a number of indie artists, including Merle Perkins, who recorded the song "Military Man".

== Principal cast ==
Actor	Role
John-Michael Lander	Christopher Bedford
David Vincent	Stewart
Jay Corcoran	Larry
Paul Outlaw	Dave
Merle Perkins	Susan
Peter Bubriski	Tom
Alan Natale	Kenny
