= Denis Malleval =

Film director from France

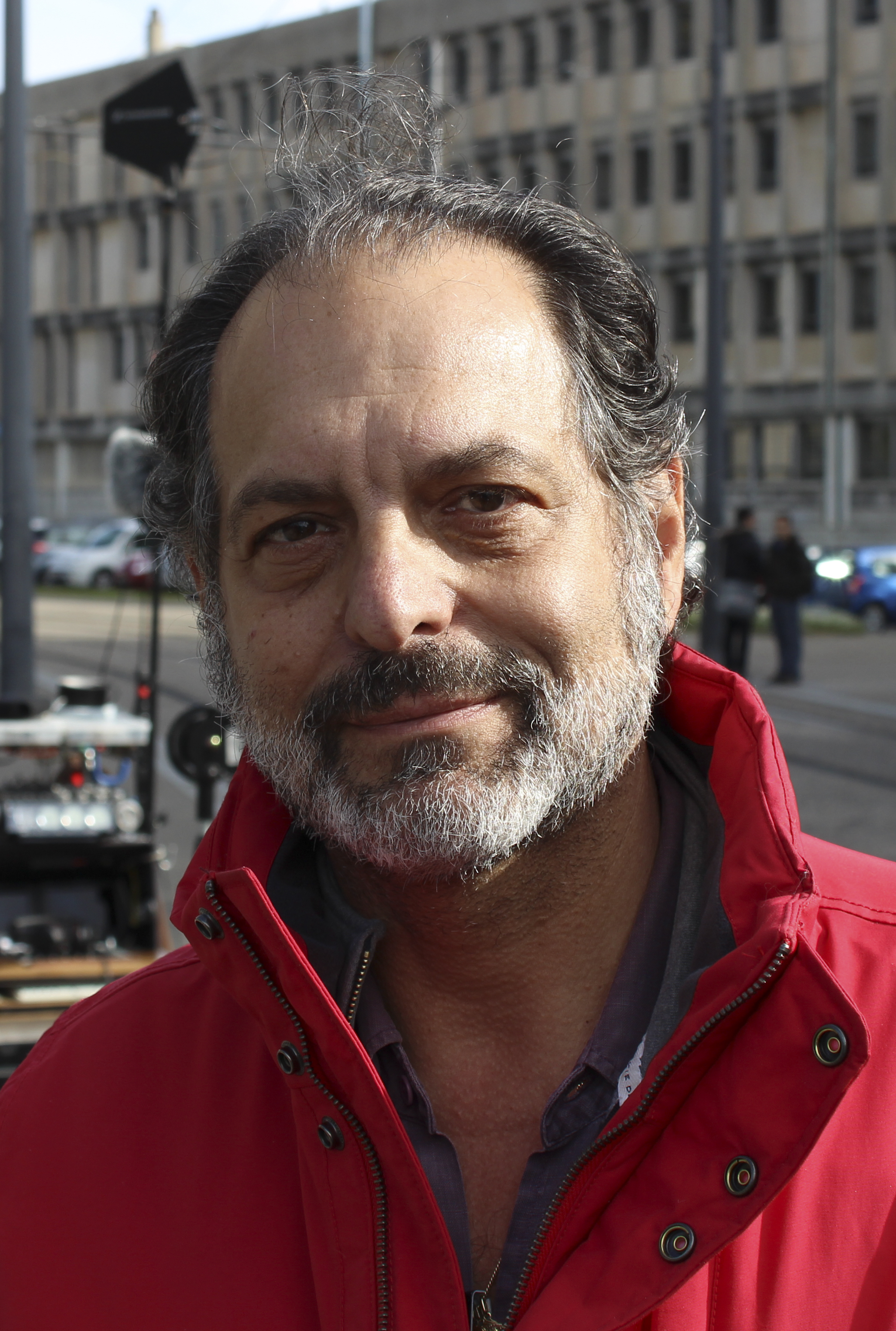
Denis Malleval (2015)

Denis Malleval is a French film director.

== Films ==
- 2012: Against Their Will, TV film
- 2014: La Boule noire, TV film, adapted from Georges Simenon's psychological drama novel with the same name
- 2025: Mort sur terre battue [Death on the Clay Court], French-Belgian TV crime drama film

== Awards ==
- 2015: Luchon TV Festival: Best Director Award for La Boule noire
- 2015: Société des Auteurs et Compositeurs Dramatiques Prize for TV film director
