= BUMIDOM =

French governmental agency, 1963 to 1982

BUMIDOM (Bureau pour le développement des migrations dans les départements d’outre-mer, French for "Office for development of migrations within overseas departments") was a French governmental agency between 1963 and 1982 in charge of emigration of the inhabitants of French overseas departments to Metropolitan France.

== Prelude ==
After World War II, French colonies fell on hard times, with rising birth rates and increasing unemployment, thus many young people were unemployed. On March 19, 1946, the Loi de la départementalisation (Law of Departmentalization) passed, making the colonies of Guadeloupe, Martinique, Reunion and French Guiana overseas departments of France, thus giving the inhabitants French citizenship and equal rights to people living in Metropolitan France. However, for many people, little changed.

There was also an attempt of repopulating the rural departments. In particular, the department of Creuse in Central France, that in its peak had as much at 287,000 residents, saw its population fall below 200,000 after World War II and continued to decline, as approximately 3,000 young people headed for larger cities each year for better employment opportunities. Thus, between 1962 and 1984, more than 2,000 children - some orphans, others not - were forcibly removed from their homes in Reunion and taken to metropolitan France to repopulate declining rural areas, with the department of Creuse receiving the majority of the children, dubbed "enfants de la Creuse" (Creuse Children).

By 1982, with the French economy beginning to stall, the BUMIDOM program was halted, prioritizing family reunification over the recruitment of new workers.

The treatment of the "Creuse Children" went largely unnoticed until the early-2000s, when some sued the French state.

The BUMIDOM experience was depicted in director Christian Faure's television movie Le rêve français "The French Dream", that premiered on France 2 in March 2018. In addition, author Jessica Oublié, daughter of a Martiniquan father and a Guadeloupean mother, penned the graphic novel "Péyi an nou" ("Our Country" in Creole) in 2017.
