= Chefs (TV series) =

2015 French TV series

- Created by: Arnaud Malherbe; Marion Festraëts
- Starring: Clovis Cornillac; Hugo Becker; Nicolas Gob; Joyce Bibring; Zinedine Soualem; Annie Cordy; Juliette Noureddine; Robin Renucci; Anne Charrier
- Country of origin: France
- No. of seasons: 2
- No. of episodes: 14

Production
- Running time: 55 minutes

Original release
- Network: France 2 (France)
- Release: February 11, 2015 – 2016

Chefs is a French drama television series that aired on France 2 (France) in 2015–16.

== Plot ==
Every year Le Chef (English: The Chef), owner of the restaurant Le Paris, and a figure in French cuisine incorporates a young offender on probation into his team. Romain, just released from prison, arrives in this new world where gastronomy and excellence mix. After a difficult integration, he shows a real talent for cooking and climbs the ranks.

== Characters ==
- Clovis Cornillac : Le Chef
- Hugo Becker : Romain
- Nicolas Gob : Yann
- Joyce Bibring : Charlène
- Zinedine Soualem : Karim
- Annie Cordy : Léonie (Season 1)
- Juliette Noureddine : Angélique (Season 1)
- Robin Renucci : Monsieur Edouard
- Anne Charrier : Delphine
- Étienne Chicot : Walter
- Philippe Nahon : Marcel (Season 2)
- Agustín Galiana : Esteban (2 Episodes)
- Jean Bediebe : Souleimane
- Max Morel : Lucien
- Anthony Pho : Woo
- Laurent Ménoret : JC
- Myriam Boyer : Mother Guy (Season 2)
- Philippe Laudenbach : The Grand Master of the Circle (Season 2)
- Laura Malvarosa : Romain'mother
- Jean-Louis Sbille : the notary (1 episode)
- Kait Tenison : Madame Bogrov (1 Episode)
- Stéphane Boucher : Robert (1 Episode)

== Awards ==
The series received the Best Series Award, the People's Choice Award for a TV Series and the Most Promising Actors for Hugo Becker at the 2015 Festival des créations télévisuelles de Luchon.

== Ratings ==
Episodes	Date	Ratings (in millions)	Percentage	Rank	Ref
1	11 February 2015	4,313,000	16,5 %	1	
2	11 February 2015	4,130,000	17,7 %	1	

Légende :

Green : highest
Red : lowest
