= Audrey Fleurot =

French actress (born 1977)

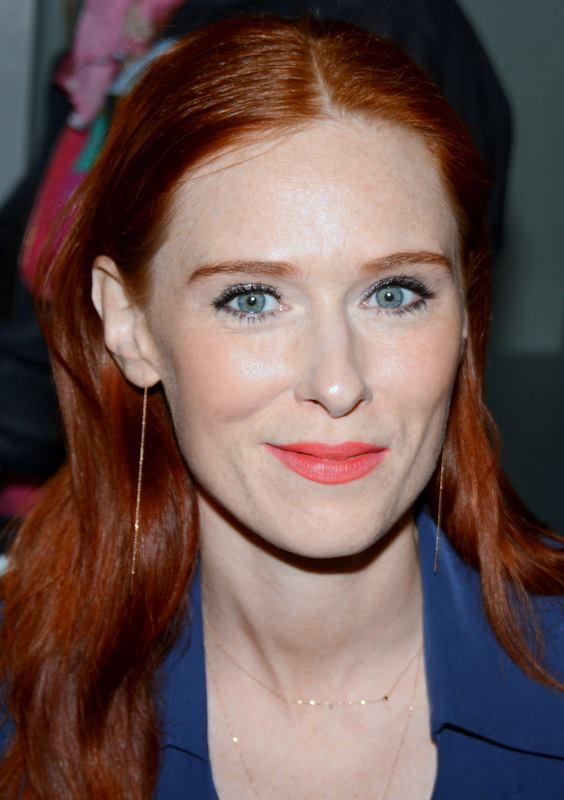
- Fleurot in February 2014
- Born: 6 July 1977 (age 48); Mantes-la-Jolie, France
- Education: Paris 1 Panthéon-Sorbonne University; École nationale supérieure des arts et techniques du théâtre, Lyon
- Occupation: Actress
- Years active: 2000–present
- Partner: Djibril Glissant
- Children: 1

Audrey Fleurot (French pronunciation: [odʁe fløʁo]; born 6 July 1977) is a French actress. She has appeared as Lady of the Lake in Kaamelott, Joséphine Karlsson in Spiral and Hortense Larcher in Un village français. In 2011, she played Magalie in the film The Intouchables.

== Early life and education ==
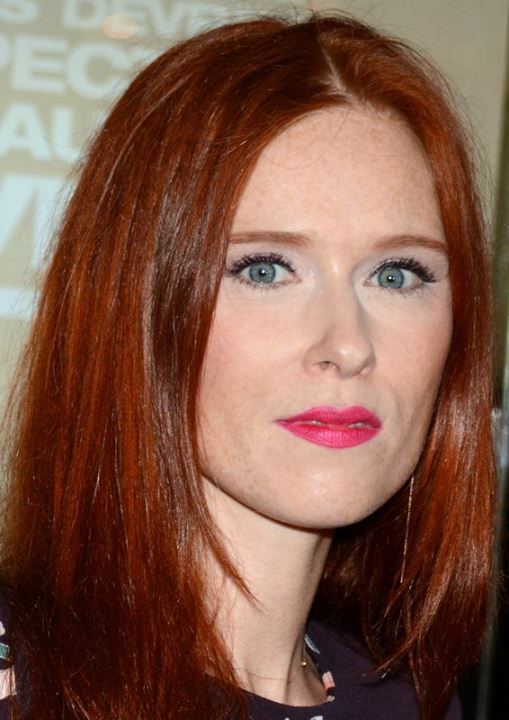
Audrey Fleurot in October 2013

Fleurot was born on 6 July 1977 in Mantes-la-Jolie, west of Paris. She is the only child of a firefighter and Comédie-Français troupe actor, and a mother who worked as a nursery nurse.

After studying at the Lycée Lamartine in Paris, where she passed an A3 theatre baccalaureate, Fleurot studied at the University of Paris I - Panthéon Sorbonne (UFR Arts plastiques et sciences de l'art) from 1995 to 1997, then graduated from the École nationale supérieure des arts et techniques du théâtre in Lyon in 2000.

== Career ==
Initially, Fleurot pursued a career in theatre but gained widespread recognition in the fields of television and film. In 2001, she appeared in the music video for Sully Sefil's song J'voulais, portraying the role of a bank robber's girlfriend.

Four years later, she rose to prominence in her breakout role, when she played the Lady of the Lake in Kaamelott, and as the ambitious lawyer Joséphine Karlsson in the widely popular police drama, Spiral (fr: Engrenages). She also played the role of Hortense Larcher, the mayor's wife, in Un village français.

She was featured in an interview conducted by Christophe Chabert in Act II of the documentary film Aux sources de Kaamelott. This documentary was produced between 2006 and 2010, servicing as a companion piece to the "Six Books" DVD collection of the popular TV series.

In 2011, her career included an appearance in the Woody Allen film Midnight in Paris, though Fleurot was disappointed that her part was largely cut during editing. In the same year, she played a supporting role in the French film The Intouchables, which went on to be an international success.

In 2015, she appeared in the first season of Call My Agent!, playing herself.

In 2018, she was named a Knight of the Order of Arts and Letters.

In 2019, she starred in the mini-series Le Bazar de la Charité, which aired on TF1 and Netflix.

== Personal life ==
She is in a relationship with actor-director Djibril Glissant. They have a son, born in late 2015.

== Theatre ==
Year	Title	Author	Director
2000	Une seconde sur deux	Sarah Fourage	Marie-Sophie Ferdane
2001	Don Juan Comes Back From the War	Ödön von Horváth	Richard Brunel
2002	Turcaret	Alain-René Lesage	Gérard Desarthe
2002	Le Voyage de monsieur Perrichon	Eugène Labiche	Laurent Pelly
2003	Vendre !	Laurent Pelly & Agathe Mélinand	Laurent Pelly
2003	The Rising Tide of Insignificance	Cornelius Castoriadis	Emmanuel Daumas
2004	L'Échange	Paul Claudel	Emmanuel Daumas
2005	Le Roi nu	Evgueni Schwarz	Laurent Pelly
2006	A Dream Play	August Strindberg	Laurent Pelly
2008–2010	The Liar	Carlo Goldoni	Laurent Pelly
2012	Miss Julie	August Strindberg	Robin Renucci
2014	Un dîner d'adieu	Matthieu Delaporte & Alexandre de la Patellière	Bernard Murat
2016–2018	Le Tartuffe	Molière	Luc Bondy

== Filmography ==
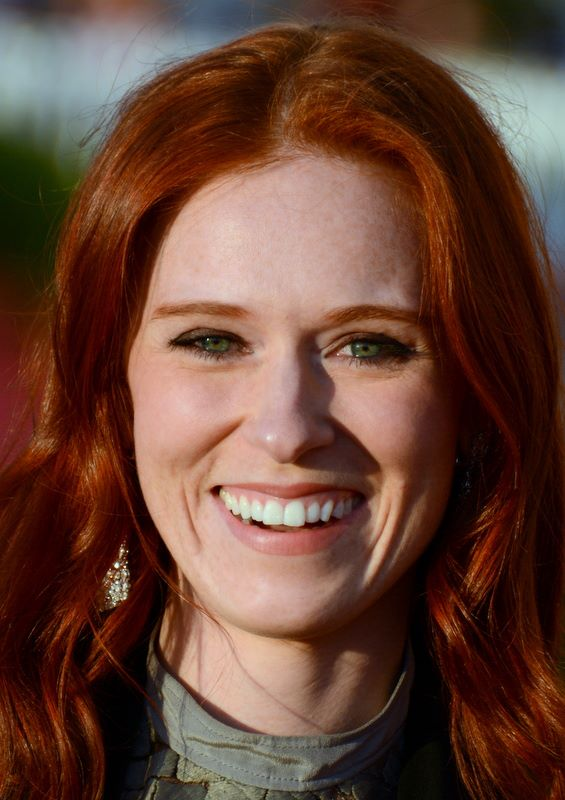
Audrey Fleurot in June 2013

Year	Title	Role	Director	Notes
2002	Froid comme l'été	Marine	Jacques Maillot	TV movie
2004	Les seins de ma prof d'anglais	Marie	Olivier Bardy	Short
2004–2009	Kaamelott	Lady of the Lake	Alexandre Astier	TV series (31 episodes)
2005	La bonne copine	Charlotte	Nicolas Cuche	TV movie
2005–2020	Spiral	Joséphine Karlsson	Jean-Marc Brondolo, Frédéric Jardin, ...	TV series (64 episodes); Nominated - ACS Award for Best Actress (2018)
2006	Une simple histoire d'amour	Laurence Duval	Jean-Luc Mathieu	Short
2006	Femmes de loi	Gaëlle Lemercier	Sylvie Ayme	TV series (1 episode)
2006	Diane, femme flic	Rose Levenne	Marc Angelo	TV series (1 episode)
2007	Two Worlds	Boubs	Daniel Cohen	
2007	Fort comme un homme	Inès	Stéphane Giusti	TV movie
2007	Greco	Madeleine Giardinelli	Philippe Setbon	TV series (1 episode)
2007	P.J.	Valérie Perrache	Thierry Petit & Gérard Vergez	TV series (2 episodes)
2007–2010	Équipe médicale d'urgence	Emma	Étienne Dhaene	TV series (3 episodes)
2008	Leur morale... et la nôtre	The TV Star	Florence Quentin	
2008	Bébé	The midwife	Clément Michel	Short
2008	Le nouveau monde	Sophie	Étienne Dhaene	TV movie
2008	Flics	Sartet	Nicolas Cuche	TV series (3 episodes)
2009	La sainte Victoire	The inspector	François Favrat	
2009	La reine et le cardinal	Duchess of Longueville	Marc Rivière	TV movie
2009	Le bourgeois gentilhomme	Dorimène	Christian de Chalonge	TV movie
2009	L'amour aller-retour	Marie	Eric Civanyan	TV movie
2009	Éternelle	Svetlana Jankova	Didier Delaître	TV mini-series
2009–2017	Un village français	Hortense Larcher	Jean-Philippe Amar, Philippe Triboit, ...	TV series (68 episodes); Nominated - ACS Award for Best Actress (2015); Nominated - ACS Award for Best Actress (2016)
2010–12	Affaires étrangères	Camille Joubert	Vincenzo Marano	TV series (4 episodes)
2010–13	Tango	Joana Larsen	Nicolas Herdt & Philippe Venault	TV series (3 episodes)
2011	The Intouchables	Magalie	Éric Toledano and Olivier Nakache	
2011	The Women on the 6th Floor	Bettina de Brossolette	Philippe Le Guay	
2011	Delicacy	Ingrid	David & Stéphane Foenkinos	
2011	Midnight in Paris	Partygoer	Woody Allen	
2011	La vie en miettes	Clara	Denis Malleval	TV movie
2011	Zak	Karen	Arthur Benzaquen & Fabrice Laffont	TV series (2 episodes)
2012	F.B.I. Frog Butthead Investigators	The President	Olivier Baroux & Kad Merad	
2013	Queens of the Ring	Jessica / Calamity Jess	Jean-Marc Rudnicki	
2013	Fonzy	Elsa	Isabelle Doval	
2013	La confrérie des larmes	Claire Foczensky	Jean-Baptiste Andrea	
2013	La fleur de l'âge	Marion Cappelaro	Nick Quinn	
2013	Pop Redemption	Martine Georges	Martin Le Gall	
2013	La vraie vie des profs	Madame Oufkir	Emmanuel Klotz & Albert Pereira-Lazaro	
2013	Le débarquement	Various	Renaud Le Van Kim	TV series (1 episode)
2014	Les Gazelles	Sandra	Mona Achache	
2014	French Women	Sophie	Audrey Dana	
2014	Belle comme la femme d'un autre	Olivia / Agathe	Catherine Castel	
2014	Notre Faust	The Temptress	Elsa Blayau & Chloé Larouchi	Short
2015–2018	Call My Agent!	Herself	Antoine Garceau & Marc Fitoussi	TV series (2 episodes)
2016	The Canterville Ghost	Aliénor de Canterville	Yann Samuell	
2016	L'idéal	Valentine Winfeld	Frédéric Beigbeder	
2017	Peur sur la Base	Odessa Berken	Laurence Katrian	TV movie
2017	Witnesses	Catherine Keemer	Hervé Hadmar	TV series (8 episodes)
2018	La Fête des mères	Anne	Marie-Castille Mention-Schaar	
2018	Safe	Zoé Chahal	Julia Ford, Daniel O'Hara, ...	TV mini-series
2019	À cause des filles ..?	Bénédicte	Pascal Thomas	
2019	Divorce Club		Michaël Youn	Post-Production
2019	Le Bazar de la Charité	Adrienne de Lenverpré	Alexandre Laurent	TV mini-series
2020	The Bank	Monica Marchand	Joachim Levy	TV series Pre-Production
2021	HPI	Morgane Alvaro	Stéphane Carrié, Alice Chegaray-Breugnot & Nicolas Jean	TV series Nominated - ACS Award for Best Actress (2021); Nominated - ACS Award for Best Actress (2022)
2021	Kaamelott: The First Chapter	Lady of the Lake	Alexandre Astier	
2022	Women at War	Marguerite de Lancastel	Alexandre Laurent	TV mini-series
2024	Bon Entendeur and Nicoletta - Fio Maravilha	P92	Edie Blanchard	Dancer in Music Video
