= Nicolas Gob =

Belgian actor (born 1982)

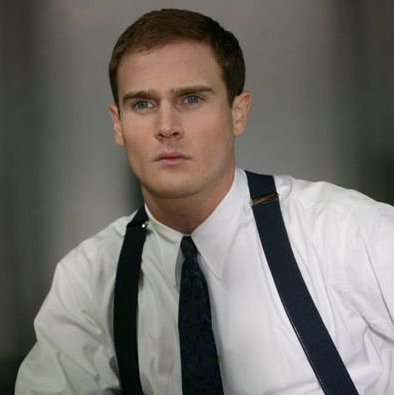
- Born: 29 October 1982 (age 43); Brussels, Belgium
- Occupation: Actor
- Years active: 2001–present
- Known for: Les Bleus; Un village français Chefs

Nicolas Gob (born 29 October 1982) is a Belgian actor who has worked extensively in television, both in serials and films made for TV. He has also appeared in several feature films.

His work in television serials includes 35 episodes in the role of Kévin Laporte in Les Bleus and 43 episodes as Jean Marchetti in Un village français as well as the role of Yann in Chefs. He also starred in the 2014 fantasy film Beauty and the Beast.

== Filmography ==
=== Cinema ===
Year	Title	Role	Director	Notes
2003	Waterloo		Benjamin Viré	Short
2004	Des plumes dans la tête		Thomas De Thier	
2006	Stormforce	Tigris Sailor	Hans Herbots	
2006	Girlfriends	Pierre	Sylvie Ayme	
2008	Home Sweet Home	Edwin	Didier Le Pêcheur	
2009	La cicatrice		Benjamin Viré	
2009	Snapshot		Jérémie Renier & Fabien Ruyssen	Short
2009	Si gentil	Alex	Christophe De Groef & Christian Mahieu	Short
2010	Cannibal	Max	Benjamin Viré	
2010	Camping 2	Policeman	Fabien Onteniente	
2010	Noir océan	Mayer	Marion Hänsel	
2013	Zone		Benjamin Viré	
2014	Une histoire banale	Fabrice	Audrey Estrougo	
2014	Beauty and the Beast	Maxime	Christophe Gans	
2016	Jailbirds	Marcus	Audrey Estrougo	
2016	Cézanne and I	Édouard Manet	Danièle Thompson	
2016	Solitaires. Le bal des sauvages		Benjamin Viré	
2019	The Shiny Shrimps	Matthias Le Goff	Maxime Govare & Cédric Le Gallo	
2022	La revanche des Crevettes Pailletées	Matthias Le Goff	Maxime Govare & Cédric Le Gallo	

=== Television ===
Year	Title	Role	Director	Notes
2001	Les Monos	Victor lookalike	Luc Boland	TV series (1 episode)
2002	Un paradis pour deux		Pierre Sisser	TV movie
2002	La vie comme elle vient	The life guard	Edwin Baily	TV movie
2004	Mon vrai père	Olivier	Dominique Ladoge	TV movie
2004	Un fils sans histoire	Sasha	Daniel Vigne	TV movie
2004	À cran, deux ans après	Julien	Alain Tasma	TV movie
2005	A Love to Hide	Jacques Lavandier	Christian Faure	TV movie
2005	Procès de famille	Lucas Danjou	Alain Tasma	TV movie
2005	3 femmes... un soir d'été	Jeff	Sébastien Grall	TV mini-series
2006	Élodie Bradford	Éric	Régis Musset	TV series (1 episode)
2006-10	Les Bleus	Kévin Laporte	Didier Le Pêcheur, Christophe Douchand, ...	TV series (35 episodes)
2007	Chat bleu, chat noir		Jean-Louis Lorenzi	TV movie
2007	Ondes de choc	Jérôme Lecoq	Laurent Carcélès	TV mini-series
2007-08	Merci, les enfants vont bien !	Benjamin	Stéphane Clavier	TV series (10 episodes)
2008	Sa raison d'être	Bruno	Renaud Bertrand	TV movie
2009-2016	Un village français	Jean Marchetti	Jean-Philippe Amar, Philippe Triboit, ...	TV series (55 episodes)
2011	Affaires étrangères	Fab	Vincenzo Marano	TV series (1 episode)
2013	Mortel été	Erik	Denis Malleval	TV movie
2013	La balade de Lucie	Bruno	Sandrine Ray	TV movie
2013	Les Dames	Jean-René Montereau	Philippe Venault, Alexis Lecaye, ...	TV series (2 episodes)
2014	The law of Barbara	Philippe Sambin	Didier Le Pêcheur	TV series (1 episode)
2015	Nina	Tomer	Nicolas Picard	TV series (1 episode)
2015	Candice Renoir	Fred	Nicolas Picard	TV series (1 episode)
2015	Le sang de la vigne	Arthur Salacrou	Aruna Villiers	TV series (1 episode)
2015-16	Chefs	Yann	Arnaud Malherbe & Clovis Cornillac	TV series (14 episodes)
2016	La promesse du feu	Damien Le Guen	Christian Faure	TV movie
2016	The law of Simon	Philippe Sambin	Didier Le Pêcheur	TV series (1 episode)
2017	Quand je serai grande... je te tuerai	Marc Guerin	Jean-Christophe Delpias	TV mini-series
2017-24	L'Art du crime	Antoine Verlay	Elsa Bennett, Hippolyte Dard, ...	TV series (22 episodes)
2018	The Chalet	Sébastien Genesta	Camille Bordes-Resnais	TV mini-series
2018	Sous la Peau	Vidal	Didier Le Pêcheur	TV mini-series
2019	Le Pont des Oubliés	Fred Roos	Thierry Binisti	TV movie
2019	La promesse de l'eau	Damien Le Guen	Christian Faure	TV movie
2019	Meurtres à Belle-Île	Thomas Keller	Marwen Abdallah	TV movie
2022	De miel et de sang	Fred Carrel	Lou Jeunet	TV movie
2022	Le Meilleur d'Entre Nous	Achille Salvi	Floriane Crépin	TV mini-series
2022	Le Trou	Nico	Benjamin Viré	TV series (10 episodes)
2023	La fille de l'assassin	Patrick	Carole Kornmann	TV movie
2023	Meurtres sur la Côte fleurie	Clément Royan	Gabriel Aghion	TV movie
2024	Rivière perdue	Victor Ferrer	Jean-Christophe Delpias	TV series (6 episodes)

== Awards and nominations ==
Year	Award	Nominated work	Result
2005	Luchon International Film Festival - Best Young Actor	A Love to Hide	Won
2008	Luchon International Film Festival - Best Actor	Sa raison d'être	Won
