= Louise Monot =

French actress and model (born 1981)

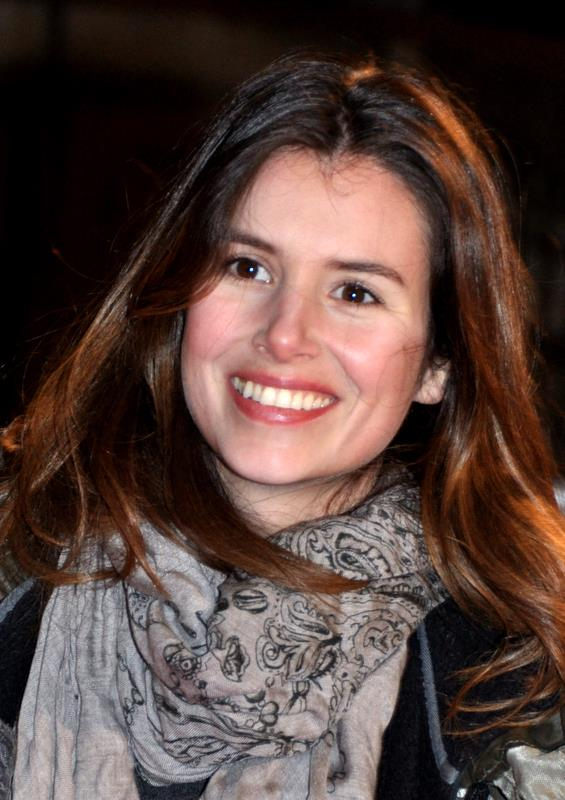
- Louise Monot at 2013 César Awards
- Born: 30 December 1981 (age 44); Paris, France
- Occupations: Actress, model
- Years active: 2000 - present
- Children: 2

Louise Monot (French: [lwiz mɔno]; born 30 December 1981) is a French actress and model. Known as the face of the French cosmetics company Bourjois, she is also known for portraying one of the schoolgirls, Marine Lavor, on the television series, La vie devant nous. Monot also appeared in the film OSS 117: Lost in Rio.

She is a cast-member on the Amazon Studios science fiction drama series, The After.

== Personal life ==
She has been in a relationship with French actor Samir Boitard since 2014. In October 2016, they announced they were expecting their first child via social networks. Their first daughter, Lila, was born in 2016. Their second daughter Selma was born in September 2020.

== Theater ==
| Year | Title | Author | Director | Notes |
|---|---|---|---|---|
| 2004-06 | Brooklyn Boy | Donald Margulies | Michel Fagadau | Théâtre des Champs-Élysées |

== Filmography ==
| Year | Title | Role | Director | Notes |
|---|---|---|---|---|
| 2000 | Un homme en colère | Vanessa | Didier Albert | TV series (1 episode) |
| 2000 | Les Cordier, juge et flic | Laetitia | Alain Wermus | TV series (1 episode) |
| 2001 | Des parents pas comme les autres | Olympe | Laurence Katrian | TV movie |
| 2001 | Famille d'accueil | Romane | Alain Wermus (2) | TV series (1 episode) |
| 2002 | La ligne noire | Zoé | Jean-Teddy Filippe | TV mini-series |
| 2002 | Louis la brocante | Martha | Michel Favart | TV series (1 episode) |
| 2002 | La vie devant nous | Marine Lavor | Vincenzo Marano | TV series (7 episodes) |
| 2003 | La deuxième vérité | Charlie | Philippe Monnier | TV movie |
| 2003 | Le Bleu de l'océan | Julie Delcourt | Didier Albert (2) | TV mini-series |
| 2003 | Le grand patron | Audrey | Emmanuel Gust | TV series (1 episode) |
| 2004 | À poil ! | The actress | Emmanuelle Bercot | Short |
| 2004 | Nos vies rêvées | Juliette Tuille / Scarlett | Fabrice Cazeneuve | TV movie |
| 2005 | A Love to Hide | Sarah Morgenstern | Christian Faure | TV movie Luchon International Film Festival - Best Young Actress |
| 2006 | I Do | Maxine | Éric Lartigau | |
| 2006 | Hell | Victoria | Bruno Chiche | |
| 2006 | Ange de feu | Lola Sorel | Philippe Setbon | TV movie |
| 2007 | Tatt av kvinnen | Mirlinda | Petter Næss | |
| 2007 | L'avare | Mariane | Christian de Chalonge | TV movie |
| 2007 | La prophétie d'Avignon | Estelle Esperanza | David Delrieux | TV mini-series |
| 2008 | The Last Deadly Mission | Blandine | Olivier Marchal | |
| 2008 | Béthune sur Nil | Cathy Vaillant | Jérôme Foulon | TV movie |
| 2008 | Scénarios contre les discriminations | Cécile Morin | Artus de Penguern | TV series (1 episode) |
| 2009 | OSS 117: Lost in Rio | Dolorès Koulechov | Michel Hazanavicius | |
| 2009 | J'attendrai | Aurore Magloire | Christelle Raynal | Short |
| 2009 | Myster Mocky présente | | Jean-Pierre Mocky | TV series (1 episode) |
| 2010 | Little White Lies | Léa | Guillaume Canet | |
| 2010 | Pièce montée | Nathalie | Denys Granier-Deferre | |
| 2010 | Mademoiselle Drot | Bénedicte Drot de Fézinzac | Christian Faure (2) | TV movie |
| 2010 | Sable noir | Florianne | Benjamin Holmsteen | TV series (1 episode) |
| 2011 | Jouer avec le feu | | Florian Desmoulins | Short |
| 2012 | La banda Picasso | Marie Laurencin | Fernando Colomo | |
| 2012 | Plan de table | Marie | Christelle Raynal (2) | |
| 2013 | Girl on a Bicycle | Cécile Laurent | Jeremy Leven | |
| 2013 | Murders at Saint-Malo | Gwenaële Garrec | Lionel Bailliu | TV movie |
| 2014 | The After | Gigi Generau | Chris Carter | TV movie |
| 2014 | Le général du roi | Constance | Nina Companeez | TV movie |
| 2014 | Où es-tu maintenant ? | Caroline Delmas | Arnaud Sélignac | TV movie |
| 2015 | Pour être deux | The girl | Emilie & Sarah Barbault | Short |
| 2015 | Malaterra | Elisabeth Viviani | Jean-Xavier de Lestrade & Laurent Herbiet | TV mini-series |
