= Moute =

Moute is a surname. Notable people with the surname include:

- Marie Mouté (born 1983), Swiss-French actress
- Roger Moute a Bidias (born 1995), Cameroonian basketball player
- Luc Mbah a Moute (born 1986), Cameroonian basketball player
