= Guillaume Delorme =

French actor

Guillaume Delorme (born 31 May 1978 in France) is a French actor.

== Theater ==
In 2005, Delorme replaced Aurelien Wiik in the play The Amazons. Delorme began playing Brice - a trainee Lieutenant Gerard Bonaventure - since the episode broadcast on 12 September 2007.

== Filmography ==
Year	Title	Role	Director	Notes
2002-06	La vie devant nous	Barthélémy Berger	Vincenzo Marano	TV series (19 episodes)
2003	Dock 13	Antoine	Sylvie Ayme, Franck Buchter & Frédéric Demont	TV series
2003	Action Justice	Guillaume	Alain Nahum	TV series (1 episode)
2003	La faucheuse	The man	Vincenzo Marano & Patrick Timsit	Short
2004	Maigret	Guillaume	Claudio Tonetti	TV series (1 episode)
2005	Julie Lescaut	Robin Curtis	Bernard Uzan	TV series (1 episode)
2006	Aller-retour dans la journée	Julien	Pierre Sisser	TV movie
2007	Élodie Bradford	Le Garrec	Olivier Guignard	TV series (1 episode)
2007	Commissaire Cordier	Paulo	Henri Helman	TV series (1 episode)
2007	Un château en Espagne	Enrique Marquès	Isabelle Doval	
2007	Louis la brocante	Damien	Patrick Marty	TV series (1 episode)
2007-10	Sœur Thérèse.com	Brice Malory	Various	TV series (9 episodes)
2008	Commissaire Valence	Franck Bessueille	Franck Apprederis	TV series (1 episode)
2009	La vie est à nous	Alex	Laura Muscardin, Patrick Grandperret & Luc Pagès	TV series (15 episodes)
2009	Romy	Alain Delon	Torsten C. Fischer	TV movie
2010	Demain je me marie	Yannick	Vincent Giovanni	TV movie
2011	En attendant Longwood	Gaspard Gourgaud	Thomas Griffet	
2011	Section de recherches	Bruno Tardieu	Eric Le Roux	TV series (1 episode)
2012	Joséphine, ange gardien	Guillaume Devigny	Sylvie Ayme (2)	TV series (1 episode)
2016	Roommates Wanted	Sébastien	François Desagnat	
2016	Le correspondant		Jean-Michel Ben Soussan	
2016	War & Peace	French Sentry	Tom Harper	TV mini-series

In the series The Life In Front Of Us (French title La Vie Devant Nous), Delorme played the role of Bartholomew, a disk jockey who is more interested in the world by night than school.
