= Last Resort (TV series) =

American military drama television series

- Genre: Drama; Military; Action; Adventure
- Created by: Shawn Ryan; Karl Gajdusek
- Starring: Andre Braugher; Scott Speedman; Daisy Betts; Camille De Pazzis; Dichen Lachman; Daniel Lissing; Sahr Ngaujah; Autumn Reeser; Jessy Schram; Robert Patrick
- Composer: Robert Duncan
- Country of origin: United States
- Original language: English
- No. of seasons: 1
- No. of episodes: 13

Production
- Executive producers: Karl Gajdusek; Marney Hochman; Shawn Ryan; Kevin Hooks; Martin Campbell
- Producer: Jean Higgins
- Production location: Oahu, Hawaii
- Cinematography: Rohn Schmidt; Krishna Rao
- Editors: Amy M. Fleming; Erik Presant; Justin Krohn; Kevin Casey; Angela M. Catanzaro; J. Kathleen Gibson
- Running time: 42 minutes
- Production companies: Big Sun Productions; MiddKid Productions; Sony Pictures Television

Original release
- Network: ABC
- Release: September 27, 2012 – January 24, 2013

Last Resort is an American military drama television series that aired on ABC from September 27, 2012, to January 24, 2013. The series was created by Shawn Ryan and Karl Gajdusek, and produced by Sony Pictures Television. On November 16, 2012, ABC announced that the series would not be picked up for another season, and the show finished with its original 13 episodes.

== Plot ==
When the crew of the U.S. Navy Ohio-class ballistic missile submarine, the USS Colorado (SSBN-753), (Note: In 2008, the U.S. Navy awarded a construction contract for a Virginia class attack submarine to be called USS Colorado. The official naming ceremony was in April 2012.) pick up a U.S. Navy SEAL team off Pakistan's coast, the Colorado receives an order to launch nuclear ballistic missiles at Pakistan.

Colorado's Commanding Officer, Captain Marcus Chaplin (Andre Braugher), asks for confirmation of the firing order because the orders were received through a legacy Cold War secondary communication channel, only to be used in the event that Washington, D.C., has already been destroyed. After confirming Washington's continued existence and refusing to fire the missiles until the command is sent through the proper system, Chaplin is relieved of command by the Deputy Secretary of Defense William Curry (Jay Karnes), and the Colorado's second in command, Lieutenant Commander Sam Kendal (Scott Speedman), is given command instead. When Kendal also questions the orders and asks for confirmation, the vessel is fired upon by the Virginia-class attack submarine USS Illinois (SSN-786). Two nuclear missile strikes are subsequently made on Pakistan by other U.S. submarines.

Realizing they have been declared enemies of their own country, the Colorado seeks refuge on the island of Sainte Marina (a fictional French island located in the Indian Ocean) and commandeer a NATO communications and early missile warning facility. When a pair of B-1 bombers is sent to attack the submarine and island, Chaplin launches a Trident nuclear missile towards Washington, D.C., to impress upon the national leadership that he's serious. The B-1s turn away at the last minute, but Chaplin (who has altered the missile's final target coordinates) allows the missile to visibly overfly Washington, D.C., and explode 200 miles (320 km) beyond in the open Atlantic, the explosion clearly visible from both Washington and New York City. Via a television feed to the media, he then declares a 200-mile exclusion zone around Sainte Marina.

Now, the crew must find a way to prove their innocence and find out who in the U.S. government has set them up, so they can finally return home.

As the series progresses, Chaplin finds himself having to become a reluctant ally with China, while trying to keep his own crew, led by Chief of the Boat Joseph Prosser (Robert Patrick), from rebelling against him. He must also combat the schemes of the local drug lord Julian Serrat (Sahr Ngaujah). The series also follows the efforts of Kylie Sinclair (Autumn Reeser), a weapons designer back home who allies with Christine Kendal (Jessy Schram), the wife of the Colorado's XO, to discern the truth behind the nuclear attack on Pakistan and the Colorado's fugitive status. An ongoing subplot involves a Navy SEAL named James King (Daniel Lissing) who, wracked with guilt over his role in the events leading to the nuking of Pakistan, cultivates a romance with one of the island's residents (Dichen Lachman) while surreptitiously aiding the XO.

The series concludes with a series of mutinies, ending with the Colorado destroyed with Chaplin still on board, the surviving crew returning home to the United States, the President assassinated, and the full story made public when Kylie Sinclair arranges for proof of the President and his administration's traitorous activities to be handed over to the press.

== Cast and characters ==
=== Main ===
- Andre Braugher as Captain Marcus Chaplin, Captain of the USS Colorado who questioned orders to fire nuclear weapons and promptly was declared a fugitive. He is a widower who lost his wife Angela to cancer; he has two sons, one of which he is estranged from and the other, Jeffrey, was a Marine who was killed in action the week prior to "Captain". At the end of the series, CAPT Chaplin went down with his ship, scuttling the Colorado to keep it out of the hands of the Chinese.
- Scott Speedman as the Executive Officer (XO), Lieutenant Commander Sam Kendal
- Daisy Betts as Lieutenant Grace Shepard, boat's navigator and daughter of Rear Admiral Arthur Shepard (a longtime friend of Captain Chaplin). An Annapolis graduate and sexual assault survivor, LT Shepard remains loyal to CAPT Chaplin and the Colorado up until its destruction. At one point, she had a one-night stand with SO1 King.
- Robert Patrick as Command Master Chief Petty Officer Joseph "Joe" Prosser, Chief of the Boat (COB) of the USS Colorado. He attempted to mutiny against CAPT Chaplin in order to return home, but was double-crossed by his own men who sought to sell the Colorado.
- Camille De Pazzis as Sophie Girard, French commander of the NATO Communications Facility. She is romantically pursued by Julian Serrat while harboring her own feelings for LCDR Kendal.
- Dichen Lachman as Tani Tumrenjack, owner of Sainte Marina Bar, with whom SO1 King strikes up a relationship.
- Daniel Lissing as Special Warfare Operator 1st Class James King, a United States Navy SEAL who was on the mission in Pakistan that went south. While on Sainte Marina, he occasionally found himself working with the Colorado crew, particularly LT Shepard (with whom he had a one-night stand) and LCDR Kendal.
- Sahr Ngaujah as Julian Serrat, the local despot on Sainte Marina
- Autumn Reeser as Kylie Sinclair, a Washington lobbyist for her family's weapons manufacturing company
- Jessy Schram as Christine Kendal, wife of Lieutenant Commander Sam Kendal

=== Recurring ===
- Michael Ng as Chief Sonar Technician Cameron Pitts
- Jessica Camacho as Petty Officer 1st Class Pilar Cortez, a member of the crew who is later revealed to CAPT Chaplin to be an embedded CIA operative put in place just in case a nuclear sea captain goes rogue.
- Will Rothhaar as Petty Officer 3rd Class Josh Brannan, a crew member who serves as CAPT Chaplin's inside man during a crew mutiny; he is killed protecting the Captain.
- Daniel Bess as the Communications Officer, Lieutenant Chris Cahill
- Michael Mosley as Senior Chief Nuclear Machinist's Mate Hal Anders, the senior nuclear engineer aboard the Colorado until he is relieved of duty and dismissed from service for raping a native girl. He later leads a mutiny with the end goal of selling the Colorado to the Chinese and is shot dead by CAPT Chaplin.
- Michael King as Petty Officer 2nd Class Kevin Hawkes, a sailor aboard the Colorado who deserted the ship, returned, and was party to Hal Anders' mutiny.
- Omid Abtahi as NATO surveillance technician Nigel
- Bruce Davison as Rear Admiral Arthur Shepard, Lieutenant Grace Shepard's father
- Jay Karnes as Deputy Secretary of Defense, later promoted to Secretary of Defense William Curry
- Ernie Hudson as Speaker of the House Conrad Buell
- Jay Hernandez as U.S. government lawyer Paul Wells
- Gideon Emery as CIA operative Booth
- David Rees Snell as Special Warfare Operator 1st Class Barry Hopper, a member of SO1 King's SEAL Team who made his way stateside to provide proof of the conspiracy.
- Chin Han as Chinese envoy Zheng Min
- Michael Gaston as Bennett Sinclair, Kylie's industrialist father
- Tyler Tuione as Chief, Tani's father
- Kasim Saul as Seaman Lawrence

== Development and production ==
ABC greenlit the pilot in January 2012, allowing filming to begin. The show was filmed in Oahu, Hawaii, and produced by Sony Pictures Television. Thirteen episodes were ordered, and on October 19, 2012, ABC ordered two additional scripts for the series.

On November 16, 2012, ABC announced that they would not be taking on Last Resort for a full season, but would air the 13 episodes that had been produced. They also passed on producing the two additional scripts that had been ordered.

On November 21, 2012, the producers revealed they had been given sufficient notice of the network's cancellation plans so they could "tweak" the final episode to function as a series finale and give the fans some closure.

== Episodes ==
| No. | Title | Directed by | Written by | Original release date | US viewers (millions) |
|---|---|---|---|---|---|
| 1 | "Captain" | Martin Campbell | Karl Gajdusek & Shawn Ryan | September 10, 2012 (online); September 27, 2012 (ABC) | 9.31 |
Marcus Chaplin is the Captain of the USS Colorado, the most powerful nuclear submarine ever built. When ordered to fire four nuclear missiles at Pakistan, he defies protocol and demands confirmation. Consequently, the USS Illinois fires on the Colorado, and the Colorado bottoms out and is left for dead. As a false flag pretext for war, the U.S. blames Pakistan for the attack, leading to a nuclear strike against Pakistan. The presumed-dead crew of the Colorado take control of the island of Sainte Marina where there is a NATO radar installation. Chaplin threatens to launch his missiles at any country, including the U.S., that attacks his ship. To prove his resolve, he fires a missile, supposedly targeted at Washington D.C.; in reality, Chaplin had set it to fly over Washington and it detonates above the ocean. Meanwhile, the local despot Serrat kidnaps two of the Colorado's crew.
| 2 | "Blue on Blue" | Kevin Hooks | Karl Gajdusek | October 4, 2012 | 8.00 |
More than twenty American warships are approaching the perimeter around the island. Chaplin activates the Perseus stealth device that makes the sub undetectable and launches an unarmed torpedo at the Illinois to warn them off. XO Sam Kendal intercepts a ground assault by Russian Spetsnaz while in the U.S. his wife is pressured to make him surrender. Joseph Prosser tells Chaplin and the crew that the recent death of his son is affecting his judgment.
| 3 | "Eight Bells" | Michael Offer | Eileen Myers | October 11, 2012 | 6.89 |
Prosser is given parole and is released from the brig to help find three crew members. Serrat has captured them and demands Chaplin pick up cargo from a ship outside the perimeter for their release. The Colorado makes the hazardous mission, but returns late, so Serrat kills one of the men. Sophie Girard decides to aid the Colorado during their mission, which causes her to miss her ride off the island. Back in the U.S., Admiral Shepard asks Kylie Sinclair to find the source of the missile launch order. The only set of blueprints and all data relating to the Perseus stealth device are stolen from the safe in Sinclair's apartment.
| 4 | "Voluntold" | Steven DePaul | Patrick Massett & John Zinman | October 18, 2012 | 7.06 |
Chaplin and Kendal learn that the U.S. government will charge them with treason. Many of the crew are unhappy, so Chaplin tells them they can choose to stay with him or return to the US. Some crewmembers have been sent orders to kill Chaplin and seize the boat. One crewman attempts to shoot Chaplin, and Petty Officer Brannan later uses a grenade to take the control room. When he is put in contact with Secretary of Defense Curry and ordered to sink the sub, he instead gives the grenade to Chaplin. Serrat is looking for valuable rare earths on the island. In the U.S., Kendal's wife has had her income cut off and is hounded by the press; Sinclair realizes that the stolen disk of Perseus data also contains the course of the Colorado prior to the attack on Pakistan.
| 5 | "Skeleton Crew" | Michael Offer | David Wiener | October 25, 2012 | 6.53 |
Secretary of Defense Curry arrives at Sainte Marina to negotiate with Chaplin and Kendal. Meanwhile, part of the sonar array protecting the island fails, allowing vessels to approach undetected. Lieutenant Shepard is forced to pilot the submarine to repair the array with King and Girard's help. When navy subs have a chance to sink the Colorado, Admiral Shepard shoots Curry and kills his adviser to prevent the firing order. In Washington, Sinclair finds herself cornered and seeks the alliance of Kendals's wife, Christine, to help her uncover the government conspiracy.
| 6 | "Another Fine Navy Day" | Christopher Misiano | Ron Fitzgerald | November 8, 2012 | 5.98 |
The island's water supply is dosed with a hallucinogen, BZ, that shortly renders most of the island's population and the sub's crew unconscious. Serrat is seen working with the unknown attackers who are intent on kidnapping one of the SEALs. Kendal awakens and partners with King to thwart the attackers while Chaplin and his crew are imperiled when a fire breaks out on board and they are disoriented by the BZ. Seeing hallucinations of his son, Jeffrey as a young boy, the Captain succumbs to sleep. However he is revived by an unknown individual who had also restored the sub's oxygen levels and stole Chaplin's launch key.
| 7 | "Nuke It Out" | Michael Offer | Nick Antosca & Ned Vizzini | November 15, 2012 | 5.68 |
Chaplin investigates his crew to find out who sabotaged the sub and stole his launch key, increasing tensions. Conflict is also renewed with Serrat, the local organized crime leader, as he assisted in the BZ attack, and also because his men have been dealing drugs to the crew, with serious consequences for Prosser. Meanwhile, the surviving SEAL from the BZ attack tells Kendal that there is a faction in Washington that wants to see the Colorado crew become a symbol of resistance against the current administration, with a promise of amnesty for the crew, but only if Chaplin is removed from command. Back in the U.S., Christine Kendal and Sinclair work together to expose the truth of what is happening to the Colorado in the national media.
| 8 | "Big Chicken Dinner" | Gwyneth Horder-Payton | Julie Siege | November 29, 2012 | 5.20 |
Chaplin organizes a feast for the crew and the islanders in celebration of the two cultures. The morning after the feast, things go bad when an essential crew member is accused of raping one of the island's women. Meanwhile, Kendal and the captured SEAL search for the mole's hidden communication system.
| 9 | "Cinderella Liberty" | Lesli Linka Glatter | Morenike Balogun | December 6, 2012 | 5.44 |
When a ship containing the family members of the crew is captured by Pakistani commandos, Chaplin and Lieutenant Shepard must make a decision to use the sub's weapons to destroy an Indian invasion force that is threatening to attack Pakistan or watch their families die. Meanwhile, the mission of the Navy SEALs is revealed, as we learn that Hopper was ordered by the Secretary of Defense to plant evidence that Pakistan was building weapons of mass destruction. King and Hopper are forced to kill two innocent men before Hopper is shot, leading to the events of the pilot.
| 10 | "Blue Water" | Billy Gierhart | Eileen Myers & Julie Siege | December 13, 2012 | 4.94 |
Kendal and King leave the island to try to rescue Kendal's wife, Christine. Meanwhile, a man representing China offers much needed aid and supplies to the crew. Prosser returns and tries to keep his injury and addiction a secret from everyone. Chaplin decides that he can't afford to keep crewmen in the brig; they are released, but two men are flogged as an example.
| 11 | "Damn the Torpedoes" | Clark Johnson | Patrick Massett & John Zinman | January 10, 2013 | 5.81 |
The U.S. Navy sends a destroyer to intercept the Chinese supply ship, forcing Chaplin to act. Sinclair reveals the President's treachery, regarding the false evidence of briefcase nukes in Pakistan, to the Speaker of the House, as Admiral Shepard and a small group of leaders plan a coup d'etat. Cortez reveals to Chaplin that she had been drawing a second paycheck from the CIA since college, and now refuses to carry out an order to kill him. Serrat makes a deal with the Chinese to exploit the island's rare earth elements.
| 12 | "The Pointy End of the Spear" | Paris Barclay | Ron Fitzgerald | January 17, 2013 | 5.07 |
A battle of alliances ensues as Chaplin receives news from Admiral Shepard about the planned coup in the U.S. Still reeling from the belief that his wife is dead, Kendal is torn between his loyalty to Chaplin, a growing concern with the Chinese intentions, fear that the coup d'etat is not the way to move forward. Prosser's mutiny team covertly sinks a Chinese supply ship as it approaches shore. It is revealed that Chaplin has a man, Brannan, inside Prosser's mutiny team. The Speaker announces to the House that he had been planning to join the coup, followed seconds later by his suicide and the uncovering of most of the conspirators. Sinclair learns that her father is supporting the President in his treachery, and he protects her from being named a conspirator in exchange for her joining the President's efforts.
| 13 | "Controlled Flight Into Terrain" | Michael Offer | Karl Gajdusek & David Wiener | January 24, 2013 | 5.48 |
When Prosser's mutiny is co-opted by those planning to sell the Colorado to the Chinese, Chaplin makes one final stand as he retakes the conn and makes the ultimate sacrifice to ensure the boat does not become anybody's tool in the complicated world situation. Sinclair plays along with her father and the President, showing her loyalty by killing her lover, while she arranges for Kendall's wife to be returned to the US. She then reveals the proof of the President's treachery before assassinating him.

== International broadcast ==
In Canada, the show was simsubbed on Global. Sony's AXN channel aired the show in Asia from October 2, 2012. Within Oceania, Australia aired the series on the Seven Network from February 20, 2013, and debuted in New Zealand on Four on May 14, 2014. Last Resort aired in the United Kingdom and Ireland by Sky1 from October 30, 2012.

== Home video release ==
| Episodes | Originally aired | | DVD release dates | | |
| Episodes | Series premiere | Series finale | Region 1 | Region 2 | Region 4 |
|---|---|---|---|---|---|
| 13 | September 27, 2012 | January 24, 2013 | July 2, 2013 | July 1, 2013 | July 4, 2013 |

== Reception ==
=== Critical response ===
On Rotten Tomatoes, the series has an approval rating of 79% with an average score of 7.3 out of 10 based on 42 reviews. The website's critical consensus is, "Last Resort is a top-notch conspiracy thriller, with cinema-quality production and riveting action sequences." On Metacritic, the series has a score of 74 out of 100 based on 31 critics, indicating "generally favorable reviews".

=== Accolades ===
| Award | Category | Recipient(s) | Episode | Result |
|---|---|---|---|---|
| Visual Effects Society Awards | Outstanding FX and Simulation Animation in a Commercial or Broadcast Program | Matt Von Brock, Bruce Coy, Junaid Farooq, Aldo Ruggiero | "Captain" | Nominated |
| Visual Effects Society Awards | Outstanding Compositing in a Broadcast Program | Matt Von Brock, Jason Fotter, Aldo Ruggiero, Brian Williams | "Captain" | Nominated |

== Cancellation and future plans ==
In an interview on Kevin Pollak's Chat Show, Shawn Ryan expressed disappointment but acknowledged that the cancellation of Last Resort was not a huge surprise. He said, "Our ratings had been on the cusp, or really below the cusp, for a few weeks now. It didn't come as a huge shock." He pointed out the tough competition, stating, "We're up against The Big Bang Theory, The X Factor, NFL games... it's a brutal time slot." He also explained the strategic placement of the show in the 8 p.m. Thursday slot, stating, "They thought [Last Resort] was a big, bold concept that would attract people." However, he added, "The addition of weekly NFL games... may not have been fully accounted for."

Regarding the future of the series, Ryan revealed that they had ambitious plans for the second half of the season. The last nine episodes were set to shift from survival to exploring how the island became a symbol for a certain group of people. New characters, such as Marcus's surviving son, would have played key roles. Ryan mentioned, "We had definite plans on where we were going to go," with storylines like Christine's rescue and the discovery of valuable minerals on the island. These developments would have expanded the narrative into more complex territory.

Andre Braugher also expressed his frustration with Last Resort's abrupt cancellation, saying, “It ended abruptly, and we had to scramble to create order where none existed.” While disappointed, he added, “Better to end like that than just be told to go home and leave it incomplete.” He also acknowledged, “I had a lot of hopes for that series, but it never came together as it should have.”
