= Julie de Bona =

French actress

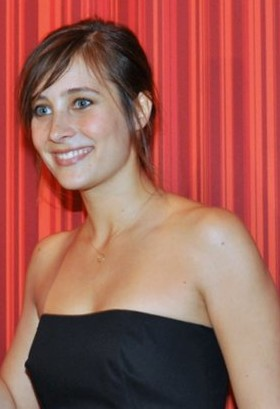
- Julie de Bona in 2011
- Born: 7 December 1980 (age 45); France
- Occupation: Actress
- Years active: 2002–present

Julie de Bona (French pronunciation: [ʒyli də bɔna]; born 7 December 1980) is a French actress.

== Life and career ==
Julie has Italian and Vietnamese ancestry. Her father is a computer scientist and her mother is a seamstress.

She was enrolled in the faculty of biochemistry when she decided at 19 years to take a year off to try theater. She followed the course of the Montpellier Conservatory before beginning her career in the theater café and then started her first small roles in television fiction.

Very discreet about her private life, Julie de Bona announces on her Instagram account on August 13, 2018, the birth of her first child, without indicating the identity of the father.

== Filmography ==
Year	Title	Role	Director	Notes
2002	Zone Reptile		Jérôme de Missolz	TV movie
2002	La vie devant nous	Éloïse	Patrick Grandperret & Yvan David	TV series (3 episodes)
2003	Fixion		Fouad Benhammou	
2004	Un souvenir pour la vie	The girl	Eric Mahe	Short
2005	Quand les anges s'en mêlent...	The deadly glare	Crystel Amsalem	
2005	T'as d'beaux yeux, tu sais!		Jean-Pierre Malignon	Short
2005-07	Sœur Thérèse.com	Sister Florence	Williams Crépin, Alain Schwartzstein, ...	TV series (6 episodes)
2006	Days of Glory		Rachid Bouchareb	
2006	Demain la veille	Anna	Julien Lecat & Sylvain Pioutaz	Short
2006	Boulevard du Palais	Elsa Leiris	Philippe Venault	TV series (1 episode)
2006-14	Une famille formidable	Christine Grenier	Joël Santoni & Alexandre Pidoux	TV series (10 episodes)
2007	Je déteste les enfants des autres	Sofia	Anne Fassio	
2007	La légende des 3 clefs	Vanessa	Patrick Dewolf	TV mini-series
2007	Le tuteur	Hermine	Jean Sagols	TV series (1 episode)
2009	Cyprien	Amandine	David Charhon	
2009	Quand passe le bus	The young lady	Chloé Micout	Short
2010	Camping 2	Pauline	Fabien Onteniente	
2010	Les princes de la nuit	The operator	Patrick Levy	
2010	Chambre 27	The woman	Alberto Bimbocci	Short
2010	Au bas de l'échelle	Alicia	Arnauld Mercadier	TV movie
2011	Beur sur la ville	Alice Gassier	Djamel Bensalah	
2011	L'ombre d'un homme	Alice	David Dang	Short
2011	Oh Merde !	The woman	Aliocha Itovich & Guillaume Ducreux	Short
2011	Gérald K Gérald	Symphonia	Élisabeth Rappeneau	TV movie
2011	L'amour en jeu	Mathilde	Jean-Marc Seban	TV movie
2012-16	La Smala s'en mêle	Wanda	Didier Grousset, Thierry Petit, ...	TV series (7 episodes)
2012	Valse favorite	Lucie	Deborah Helpert	Short
2012	Talons aiguilles & bottes de paille	Vanessa	Bruno Bontzolakis, Philippe Dajoux, ...	TV series (26 episodes)
2013	Né quelque part	Audrey	Mohamed Hamidi	
2013	La vie comme elle vient	Clémence	Arnaud Sadowski	Short
2013	VDM		Fouad Benhammou	TV series (1 episode)
2014	Maintenant ou jamais	Louise's mother	Serge Frydman	
2014	La Vallée des Mensonges	Laura	Stanislas Graziani	TV movie
2014	La crèche des hommes	Juliette	Hervé Brami	TV movie
2014	La voyante	Claire	Henri Helman	TV movie
2014-15	Ma pire angoisse	Noémie	Vladimir Rodionov	TV series (7 episodes)
2015	Arès		Jean-Patrick Benes	
2015	Un parfum de sang	Elodie Versini	Pierre Lacan	TV movie
2015	Nina	Juliette	Éric Le Roux	TV series (1 episode)
2016	Qui sème l'amour...	Julie	Lorenzo Gabriele	TV movie
2016	Le secret d'Elise	Julie	Alexandre Laurent	TV mini-series
2017	Dehors, tu vas avoir si froid		Arnaud Sadowski	
2019	Le Bazar de la Charité	Rose Rivière	Alexandre Laurent	TV mini-series
2022	Women at War	Mother Superior Agnès	Alexandre Laurent	TV mini-series
2022	L'école de la vie	Alexandra Delage	Slimane-Baptiste Berhoun, Elsa Bennett and Hippolyte Dard	TV mini-series
2024	Le Comte de Monte-Cristo	Victoria	Matthieu Delaporte, Alexandre de La Patellière	

== Theater ==
Year	Title	Author	Director	Notes
2002	La queue du Diable	Christian Dob	Christian Dob	Theatre du Grand Mélo
2002-03	État critique	Michel Lengliney	Éric Civanyan	Theatre Fontaine
2004	J’veux pas être seul(e)	Thomas Le Douarec	Thomas Le Douarec	Theatre de Trévise
2005-06	Dernier Rappel	Josiane Balasko	Josiane Balasko	Théâtre de la Renaissance
2007-08	Puzzle	Woody Allen	Sébastien Azzopardi	Théâtre du Palais-Royal
2008-09	The Imaginary Invalid	Molière	Georges Werler	Théâtre de la Porte Saint-Martin
2015	Énorme !	Neil LaBute	Marie-Pascale Osterrieth	Théâtre de la Clarté
