= Cannibal (2010 film) =

- Film poster
- Directed by: Benjamin Viré
- Written by: Benjamin Viré
- Produced by: Eloi Gérard
- Starring: Nicolas Gob; Helena Coppejans; Eric Godon; Philippe Nahon; Micky Molina
- Cinematography: Raphaël Kolacz
- Edited by: Benjamin Viré
- Music by: Philippe Malempré; David Minjauw
- Production company: Plot Point Productions
- Distributed by: Shoreline Entertainment
- Release date: October 2, 2010
- Running time: 103 minutes
- Country: Belgium
- Language: French

Cannibal is a 2010 Belgian horror film written and directed by Benjamin Viré. It stars Nicolas Gob, Helena Coppejans, and Eric Godon.

== Plot ==
Max, agoraphobic, lives as a recluse in the woods. While playing golf, he stumbles upon an unconscious and bloody young woman whom he brings home. She runs away one evening and he follows her. He then discovers that she seduces men, then eats them, after having had sex with them. He covers up his misdeeds as best he can and a relationship between fear and tenderness sets in between them, until she is kidnapped. He decides to find her, whatever the ordeals...

== Cast ==
- Nicolas Gob as Max
- Helena Coppejans as Bianca
- Jean Collard as Alex
- Eric Godon as Le Gitan
- Pierre Nisse as Cuneyt
- Jonathan Demurger as Jannot
- Micky Molina (Miguel Molina) as Hubert
- Philippe Nahon as The father
- Fatih Cam as Fatih
- Sayat Puzant as Sayat
- Cédric Tabala as Cristiano
- Mounir Tinani as Samuel
- Marilyn Capel as Sandrine
- Benjamin Ramon as Dimitri
- Hugues Hausman as The brother
- Anaël Snoek as The step-sister
- Frederic Guillaume as Sam
- Nathan Germanus as Arnaud
- Youri Garfinkiel as Tom
- Cuneyt Nerovalias Young Turk

== Accolades ==
=== Nominated ===
- 2010 Festival International du Film Francophone de Namur: Youth Jury Emile Cantillon Award: Best Feature Film - Benjamin Viré
- 2010 Raindance Film Festival: Jury Prize: Best Debut Feature - Benjamin Viré (director)
- 2011 MOTELx - Festival Internacional de Cinema de Terror de Lisboa: International Competition: Room Service - Benjamin Viré
- 2011 Singapore International Film Festival: Director in Focus - Benjamin Viré
