= Sœur Thérèse.com =

- Genre: Legal drama
- Created by: Michel Blanc
- Starring: Dominique Lavanant; Martin Lamotte
- Composer: Charles Court
- Country of origin: France
- Original language: French
- No. of seasons: 10
- No. of episodes: 21

Production
- Running time: 90 minutes

Original release
- Network: TF1
- Release: September 30, 2002 – May 16, 2011

Sœur Thérèse.com is a French televised legal drama that ran on TF1 from September 30, 2002, until May 16, 2011, and was created by Michel Blanc. Since June 20, 2012, the show has been broadcast on NT1 and on TV5Monde. The series was filmed partially in the Saint-Julien-le-Pauvre Church in Paris and the Royal Abbey of St. Vincent in Senlis. The series reached a peak audience of 9.9 million viewers in 2004, but it slowly began to lose viewers until its end in 2011.

== Premise ==
Sister Thérèse is a police officer-turned nun. Her ex-husband Gérard Bonaventure, who serves as the local police lieutenant, often asks for Sister Thérèse's help in solving murder cases, and she does so with the full support of the convent's Mother Superior, who is a fan of crime fiction. In most episodes of the show, Sister Thérèse solves the crime using creative or unconventional methods, such as tracking counterfeit T-shirt sales or finding a cadaver while on a religious pilgrimage. The series also introduces plot twists, like Sister Thérèse having temporary amnesia and introducing her previously-unknown twin sister.

The series also focuses on the interaction between the convent and the police force that comes as a result of Sister Thérèse's cooperation with Gérard. Gérard's assistant Gabriel uses his visits to the convent as a means to see Sister Clémence and, later on, Sister Florence. Gérard's intern Brice similarly falls in love with one of the nuns, Sister Suzanne. Gérard's partner on the police force, Lucie, does not appreciate Sister Thérèse's interference in the team's crime-solving work.

The nuns also must deal with Jacky Roche, their scheming landlord, who wants to take back his property. To help in paying their rent, the nuns manufacture duvets, which they then sell on the website www.soeurtherese.com. Most episodes end with a running gag in which Sister Thérèse refuses to continue cooperating with Gérard and Gérard misidentifies her website as soeurtherese.fr.

== Cast and characters ==
- Dominique Lavanant as Sister Thérèse (Juliette, before joining the convent), the nun who solves crimes and also runs the convent's duvet-selling website
- Martin Lamotte as Gérard Bonaventure, Sister Thérèse's ex-husband and the city's police lieutenant
- Édith Scob as the Mother Superior, who encourages Sister Thérèse's involvement in solving crimes due to her own love of crime novels
- Sébastien Knafo as Gabriel Lambert, Gérard's assistant
- Guillaume Delorme as Brice Malory, Gérard's intern, who replaces Gabriel
- Ariane Séguillon as Lucie, Gérard's partner on the police force
- Philippe Khorsand as Jacky Roche, the landlord who wants to reclaim his property from the convent
- Taïra Borée as Sister Marie-Myriam
- Julie de Bona as Sister Florence
- Marie Denarnaud as Sister Clémence
- Maria Ducceschi as Sister Suzanne
- Christian Pereira as Delvaux, colleague and enemy of Gérard Bonaventure, Lucie's ex-husband
- Gérard Caillaud as Mazaud, police chief

=== Guest ===
- Anne Benoît as Catherine Bayard
- Arthur Dupont as Dimitri Blondel
- Francine Bergé as The reverend
- Francis Perrin as Alain Carlier
- Guillaume de Tonquédec as Bertrand Tardy
- Loïc Corbery as Lionel Mestayer
- Lucien Jean-Baptiste as Moussa Trabendo
- Marie-Christine Adam as Madame Poivre
- Mata Gabin as The judge
- Nicolas Vaude as Rémy Couty
- Pascal Elso as Rosset
- Stéphane Debac as Denis Perrin
- Valérie Vogt as Le Balto's Boss
- Lizzie Brocheré as Inès Martin

== Production ==
Christian Faure has directed 2 Episodes of the TV Series.
