= Women at War (TV series) =

Franco-Belgian miniseries

- Created by: Cécile Lorne, Camille Treiner
- Directed by: Alexandre Laurent
- Starring: Audrey Fleurot Julie de Bona Camille Lou Sofia Essaïdi
- Original language: French
- No. of episodes: 8

Production
- Producer: Iris Bucher
- Production location: France
- Production company: Quad Drama
- Budget: 20 million euros.

Original release
- Network: TF1; Netflix
- Release: September 11, 2022

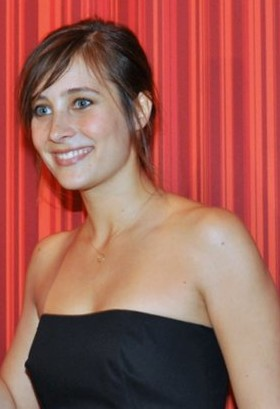
Julie de Bona at the French Cinema Golden Stars ceremony

Women at War (French: Les Combattantes) is an eight-episode Franco-Belgian historical miniseries created by Cécile Lorne and Camille Treiner and directed by Alexandre Laurent, which originally aired on Radio Télévision Suisse's RTS1, followed by RTBF's La Une and then TF1 in September 2022.

It has been available on Netflix since October 2022 for French viewers and January 2023 internationally. The series has appeared among the Netflix top 10 shows in 58 countries the following week.

== Synopsis ==
In 1914, during the very first month of WW1, the destinies of four women intersect in the small town of Saint-Paulin, in the Franco-German border area of the Vosges: Marguerite de Lancastel, a mysterious Parisian sex worker; Caroline Dewitt, propelled to the head of the family factory; Mother Agnès, Mother Superior of a requisitioned convent turned into a military hospital; and Suzanne Faure, an abortionist nurse on the run.

== Cast ==
- Brothel
  - Audrey Fleurot: Marguerite de Lancastel, looking for someone on the Vosges frontlines
  - Yannick Choirat: Marcel Dumont, the brothel owner
  - Florence Loiret Caille: Yvonne Dumont, Marcel's sister
  - Eden Ducourant : Juliette, Marcel's "favorite"
  - Emmanuelle Bouaziz: Florence
  - Juliette Poissonnier: Alice
  - Lilea Le Borgne: Solange
  - Laure Franquès: Catherine
  - Candice Pauilhac: Odile
  - Bérénice Ouedraogo: Irène
- Convent
  - Julie de Bona: Mother Superior Agnès
  - Camille Lou: Suzanne Faure, nurse at the Pitié-Salpêtrière Hospital, a former abortionist, accused of murder
  - Tom Leeb: Major Joseph Duvernet, military surgeon
  - Laurent Gerra: Abbé Vautrin
  - Marie Mallia: Sister Geneviève
  - Maëva Dambron: Sister Clarence
  - Bélinda Portoles: Sister Bélinda
- Truck Factory
  - Sofia Essaïdi: Caroline Dewitt, Victor's wife.
  - Sandrine Bonnaire: Éléonore Dewitt, mother of Charles and Victor.
  - Grégoire Colin: Charles Dewitt
  - Lionel Erdogan: Victor Dewitt, the factory owner
  - Stacy Grewis Belotti: Madeleine Dewitt, Victor and Caroline's daughter
  - Michaël Vander-Meiren: Jean
  - Aurélie Boquien: Denise
  - Catherine Artigala: Germaine
- French Army
  - Tchéky Karyo: General Duvernet
  - Maxence Danet-Fauvel: Lieutenant Colin de Renier
  - Édouard Eftimakis: Lieutenant Léon Duvernet
  - Mikaël Mittelstadt: Gustave, known as Gus
  - Thomas Salsmann: Brief
  - Jérémy Wulc: Lieutenant Passembec
  - Hervé Sogne: Colonel Keller
  - Samuel Giuranna: Colonel Lehmann
  - Nicolas Van Beveren: Captain Maurice Delille
- Others
  - Romane Portail: Jeanne Charrier
  - Vincent Rottiers: Lucien Charrier
  - Cassiopée Mayance: Claudine Charrier
  - Pascal Houdus: Till von Hoffstaten
  - Maximilien Poullein: Karl, German aviator negotiating with the French double agent
  - Jean-Michel Noirey: President Raymond Poincaré
  - Noam Morgensztern (of Comédie-Française) : Louis Compoing, the Parisian detective hunting Suzanne Faure
  - Théo Costa-Marini : adjudant Bernard Bergeret, of the Saint-Paulin gendarmerie
  - Ulysse Mengue : commandant Clovis Dudillot, of the Saint-Paulin gendarmerie

== Reception ==
On the review aggregator website Rotten Tomatoes, 83% of 6 critics' reviews are positive, with an average rating of 6.0/10.

Joel Keller wrote in his review on Decider: "STREAM IT. Women At War starts a bit dry, but by the end of its first episode, viewers can see that the drama will start to be amped up, beyond the violence inherent in war."

Kayleigh Dray wrote for Stylist: "Reactions to the series have been largely positive, with many praising its complex female characters, excellent twists and turns, and unflinching ability to portray 'the true horrors of World War I, both on the field and off of it.' Others, meanwhile, have thanked producers for adopting a non-exploitative approach when weaving the stories of the four women at its center. And plenty have piled praise on cinematographers for all of those incredible panoramas of the war-ravaged French countryside, too."

== See also ==
- Le Bazar de la Charité
- Women in World War I
- Marthe Richard
- Nicole Girard-Mangin
- Marie Marvingt
- Louise de Bettignies
- Amélie Rigard
- Munitionette
