= Camille De Pazzis =

French actress

- Born: 9 March 1978 (age 47); France
- Occupation: Actress
- Years active: 2000–present

Camille De Pazzis is a French actress most famous for starring in the French series La vie devant nous. She is also a face of Lancôme.

She has co-starred in the American television series Last Resort and The Following. In 2015, De Pazzis was cast as Annie in the third and final season of Hemlock Grove.

== Filmography ==
Film roles
Year	Title	Role	Notes
2001	Gamer	Nina	
2006	Quand j'étais chanteur	Jenifer	
2007	Mister Lonely	Nun 2	
2008	Le premier jour du reste de ta vie	Moïra	English title: The First Day of the Rest of Your Life
2009	Le missionnaire	Maria	
2010	Comme les cinq doigts de la main	Camille	
2012	The Zigzag Kid	Zohara	

Television roles
Year	Title	Role	Notes
2000	Nestor Burma		1 episode
2002	La vie devant nous	Ines	6 episodes
2003	La deuxième vérité	Lucie Forest	TV movie
2003	Les enquêtes d'Éloïse Rome	Domino	Episode: "Le protecteur"
2005	Quai n° 1	Karen	Episode: "Surenchère"
2006	Alex Santana, négociateur	Valérie	Episode: "Guet-apens"
2009	La vie est à nous	Marion	18 episodes
2009	Pigalle, la nuit	Amandine	4 episodes
2010	Nicolas Le Floch	La Satin	2 episodes
2012	Last Resort	Sophie Girard	Main role, 13 episodes
2014	The Following	Gisele	Recurring role, 6 episodes
2015	Hemlock Grove	Annie Archambeau	Main role, season 3
2016	Agents of S.H.I.E.L.D.	Anon	Episode: "The Singularity"
