= Sofia Essaïdi =

French-Moroccan singer and actress

Sofia Essaïdi صوفيا السعيدي
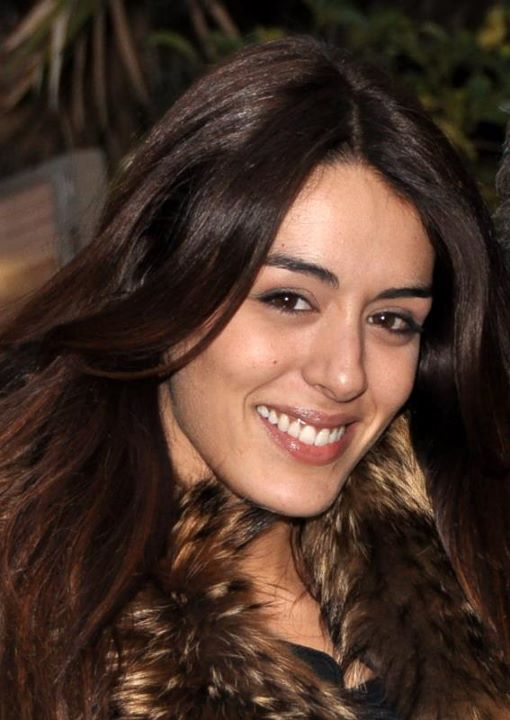
- Essaïdi in January 2012 at the NRJ Music Awards ceremony

Background information
- Born: 6 August 1984 (age 42); Casablanca, Morocco
- Origin: Moroccan-French
- Genres: French pop R&B
- Occupations: Singer, actress
- Years active: 2003–present
- Labels: Mercury; Universal Music
- Website: sofia-web.com

Sofia Essaïdi (Arabic: صوفيا السعيدي; born 6 August 1984) is a French-Moroccan singer and actress. She was born in Casablanca, to a Moroccan father, Lhabib Essaïdi, and a French mother, Martine Adeline Gardelle.

== Career ==
From 30 August to 13 December 2003, she participated in the show Star Academy France's third season, becoming a semi-finalist. She eventually finished second to Elodie Frégé.

From 12 March to 7 August 2004, she participated in the Star Academy tour, going to Morocco, and Papeete, Tahiti, where she celebrated her 20th birthday. She released her first album called Mon cabaret. Later, she starred in the musical Cléopâtre, la dernière reine d'Égypte choreographed by Kamel Ouali which opened in "le Palais des Sports" in Paris on 29 January 2009.

== Discography ==
=== Album ===
Year	Information	Charts position		
Year	Information	FR	SWI	BEL
2005	Mon cabaret: Studio album; Released: 22 August 2005; Format: CD, digital download	41	100	46
2008	Cléopâtre, la dernière reine d'Égypte: Soundtrack; Released : 25 August 2008	11	25	32

=== Singles ===
Year	Title	Charts position			Album
Year	Title	FR	SWI	BEL	Album
2004	"Roxanne"	20	34	13	Mon Cabaret
2005	"Mon cabaret"	–	–	–	Mon Cabaret
2005	"Après l'amour" (Digital single only)	–	–	–	Mon Cabaret
2008	"Femme d'aujourd'hui" (Musical comedy Cléopâtre)	8	94	27	Cléopâtre, la dernière reine d'Égypte
2008	"Une autre vie" (& Florian Etienne) (Musical comedy Cléopâtre)	–	–	–	Cléopâtre, la dernière reine d'Égypte
2009	"L'accord" (& Christopher Stills) (Musical comedy Cléopâtre)	7	–	–	Cléopâtre, la dernière reine d'Égypte
2009	"Bien après l'au-delà" (Musical comedy Cléopâtre)	–	–	–	

=== Guest Vocals ===
- 2004 "Et si tu n'existais pas" (with Toto Cutugno)
- 2007 "Il n'y a plus d'après" (with Tomuya)
- 2010 "If" (As one of the artists of Collect If Aides 25 Ans)
- 2010 "La voix de l'enfant" (with Natasha St Pier & Bruno Solo)

== Awards ==
- 2009 – NRJ Music Awards : Francophone Group/Duo of the Year ( She was one of the artists who starred in the musical Cléopâtre)
- 2010 – NRJ Music Awards : Francophone Female Artist of the Year
- 2010 – Les jeunes talents de l'année: On 12 February 2010 she won Best Actress at Les jeunes talents de l'année 2009 (Young Talents of the Year 2009)

== Filmography ==
Year	Title	Role	Director	Notes
2005	Iznogoud	Belbeth	Patrick Braoudé	
2009–2012	Aïcha	Aïcha	Yamina Benguigui	TV series (4 episodes)
2012	La clinique de l'amour!	Jennifer Gomez	Artus de Penguern & Gábor Rassov	
2014	Mea Culpa	Myriam	Fred Cavayé	
2015	Up & Down	Leïla	Ernesto Oña	TV movie
2017	Murders in Auvergne	Aurélie Lefaivre	Thierry Binisti	TV movie
2018	Insoupçonnable	Leila Baktiar	Christophe Lamotte & Frédéric Garson	TV series (9 episodes)
2019	Kepler(s)	Alice Hadad	Frédéric Schoendoerffer	TV series (6 episodes)
2020	La Promesse	Sarah Castaing	Anne Landois	TV series (6 episodes)
2022	Nostalgia	Arlette	Mario Martone	
2022	Women at War	Caroline DeWitt	Alexandre Laurent	TV mini-series (8 episodes)

== Theatre ==
Year	Title	Role	Location	Notes
2009–2010	Cléopâtre, la dernière reine d'Égypte	Cleopatra	Palais des Sports	National / Belgium / Switzerland Tour
2018–2019	Chicago	Velma Kelly	Théâtre Mogador	First French-language production
