= A Love to Hide =

- Screenplay by: Pascal Fontanille; Samantha Mazeras
- Directed by: Christian Faure
- Starring: Jérémie Renier; Charlotte de Turckheim; Bruno Todeschini; Michel Jonasz; Louise Monot; Nicolas Gob
- Music by: Charles Court
- Country of origin: France
- Original language: French

Production
- Producers: François Aramburu; Laetitia Bartoli; Pascal Fontanille
- Cinematography: Svetlana Ganeva
- Editor: Jean-Daniel Fernandez-Qundez
- Running time: 102 minutes

Original release
- Network: France 2
- Release: 7 March 2005

A Love to Hide (French title: Un amour à taire) is a 2005 French film made for television, directed by Christian Faure. It is loosely based on the book Moi, Pierre Seel, déporté homosexuel by Pierre Seel.

== Plot summary ==
The story is set in France during the Second World War.

A young Jewish girl, Sarah, attempts to escape persecution by the Third Reich after witnessing her parents and sister being brutally killed by a smuggler who betrays them during an attempt to flee to England. Traumatized, she is taken in by her childhood friend Jean, a gay man who is secretly involved in a relationship with his lover, Philippe.

For a time, they remain safe thanks to Jean’s plan to pass Sarah off as a Christian employee at his laundromat under the name Yvonne. However, a poor decision by Jean’s troublesome brother, Jacques, leads to Jean being falsely accused of having an affair with a German officer. As a result, Jean is arrested and sent to a Nazi labor camp.

== Cast ==
- Jeremie Renier as Jean Lavandier
- Charlotte de Turckheim as Marcelle Lavandier
- Bruno Todeschini as Philippe
- Michel Jonasz as Armand Lavandier
- Louise Monot as Sarah Morgenstern
- Nicolas Gob as Jacques Lavandier
- Olivier Saladin as Breton
- Yulian Vergov as Johann Von Berg

== Production ==
A Love to Hide is the second film of director Christian Faure dealing with homosexuality. He had previously directed Just a Question of Love (2000), a made-for-television film chronicling a love story between two young men.

This is one of few films about the deportation of homosexuals during World War II. (Also see Bent.) A Love to Hide is loosely based on the book Moi, Pierre Seel, déporté homosexuel by Pierre Seel published in 1994.

== Reception ==
The Variety Magazine felt the film was sometimes "over-rigged in script and direction" but nonetheless gave a positive review.
