= Le Bazar de la Charité =

French television drama miniseries

- Genre: Drama
- Written by: Catherine Ramberg; Karin Spreuzkouski
- Directed by: Alexandre Laurent
- Starring: Audrey Fleurot; Julie de Bona; Camille Lou
- Music by: François Liétout
- Country of origin: France
- Original language: French
- No. of episodes: 8

Production
- Producer: Iris Bucher
- Cinematography: Jean-Philippe Gosselin

Original release
- Network: TF1
- Release: November 2019 – December 2019
- Network: Netflix
- Release: 26 December 2019

Le Bazar de la Charité ('The Bonfire of Destiny') is a French drama television miniseries, that debuted on Netflix on 26 December 2019, after airing on French free-to-air channel TF1 during November–December 2019.

== Plot ==
Le Bazar de la Charité begins with the depiction of a true event, the fire at the Bazar de la Charité in Paris, 4 May 1897, in which 126 people died. Planning to visit the bazaar is Adrienne de Lenverpré (Audrey Fleurot), an upper-class woman who seeks to escape from her marriage to her tyrant husband, Marc-Antoine de Lenverpré (Gilbert Melki), a candidate for the President of the Senate. While Adrienne's niece, Alice de Jeansin, along with her close confidant and maidservant, Rose Rivière, attend the bazaar the fire breaks out. Adrienne, who had entered the event earlier but left to meet her paramour, realizes to her horror that she, too, could have been inside. From there the plot revolves around the aftermath of the conflagration and the lives of the three women.

== Cast ==
- Audrey Fleurot as Adrienne de Lenverpré
- Julie de Bona as Rose Rivière
- Camille Lou as Alice de Jeansin
- Gilbert Melki as Marc-Antoine de Lenverpré
- Josiane Balasko as Madame Huchon
- Antoine Duléry as Auguste de Jeansin
- Florence Pernel as Mathilde de Jeansin
- Théo Fernandez as Julien de la Ferté
- Victor Meutelet as Victor Minville
- François-David Cardonnel as Hugues Chaville
- Stéphane Guillon as Célestin Hennion
- Aurélien Wiik as Jean Rivière

== Cast gallery ==
Distribution of principal actors.

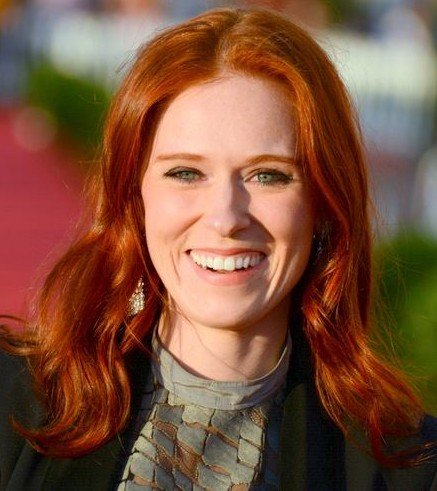
Audrey Fleurot

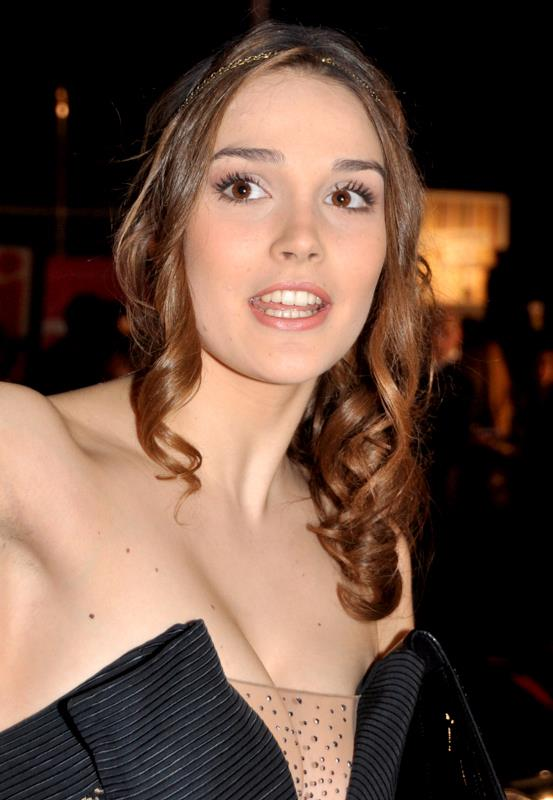
Camille Lou

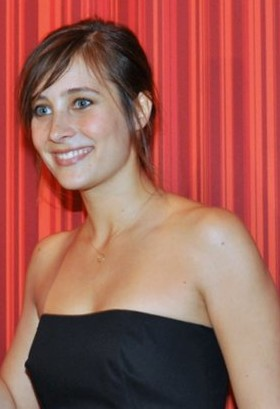
Julie de Bona

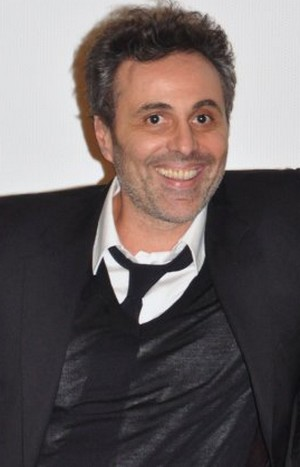
Gilbert Melki

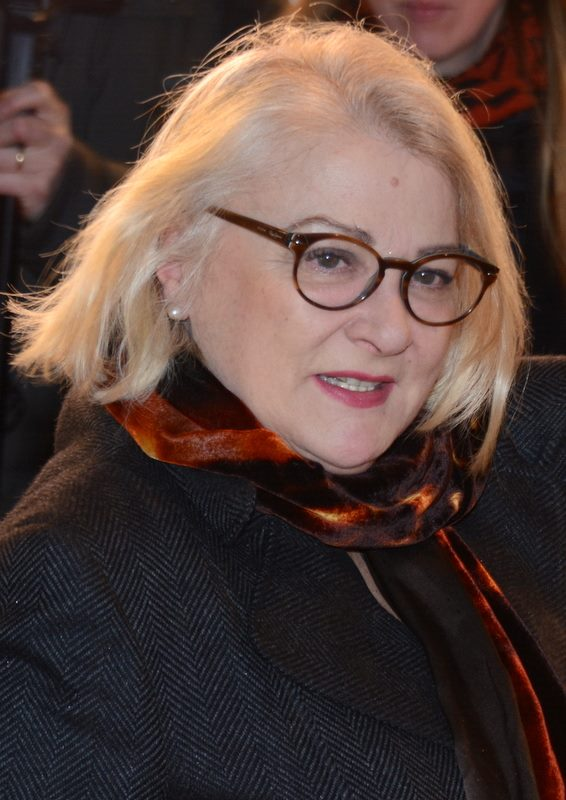
Josiane Balasko

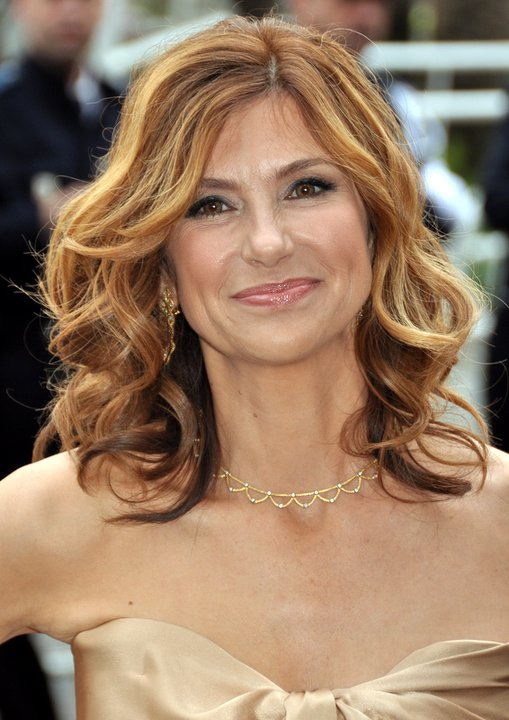
Florence Pernel

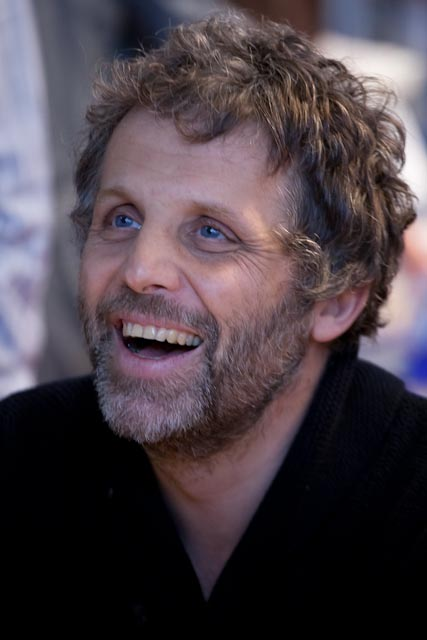
Stéphane Guillon

== See also ==
- Women at War (TV series)
