= The Prey (2011 film) =

- Film poster
- French: La proie
- Directed by: Éric Valette
- Written by: Laurent Turner; Luc Bossi
- Produced by: Luc Bossi
- Starring: Albert Dupontel; Alice Taglioni
- Cinematography: Vincent Mathias
- Edited by: Fabrice Rouaud; Christophe Pinel
- Distributed by: StudioCanal
- Release date: 13 April 2011 (France)
- Running time: 102 minutes
- Country: France
- Language: French
- Budget: $10.4 million
- Box office: $3.1 million

The Prey (French: La proie) is a 2011 French action thriller directed by Éric Valette, written by Laurent Turner and Luc Bossi, and starring Albert Dupontel as an escaped criminal who must outwit a dogged cop (Alice Taglioni) while he attempts to rescue his daughter (Jaïa Caltagirone) from a serial killer (Stéphane Debac).

== Plot ==
After a successful heist, Franck Adrien and his partner are convicted and sent to prison. Adrien is the only one who knows the location of the stash, and he refuses to tell both his wife and his partner. However, despite his initially aloof relationship with Jean-Louis Maurel, Adrien comes to trust his cellmate and saves him from a savage beating by Russian mobsters. When Adrien's former partner puts him in the prison hospital, Maurel visits Adrien. Although Adrien does not trust Maurel enough to reveal the location of his stash, Adrien gives Maurel a hint to pass along to Anna, Adrien's wife, as Maurel is being released early due to his alleged victim recanting her charges of rape.

Adrien's peace of mind is ruined when Manuel Carrega, a member of the National Gendarmerie, visits him and requests information on Maurel, whom he insists is a serial killer and rapist. When the Russian mobsters ambush Adrien in retaliation for his earlier intervention, Adrien overpowers both them and a corrupt guard, and he escapes from the prison by using the guard's uniform. While Adrien attempts to check on his family, he encounters Claire Linné, a rising star who has been reassigned to capture him. Gambling that she will not shoot an unarmed man, Adrien flees her custody and attempts to locate his family. Unable to find them, he checks his stash, where he finds his wife's corpse hidden.

Using a cell phone, Adrien briefly makes contact with Maurel, who assures him that his daughter Amélie is safe – but only so long as Adrien stays away, as Christine, Maurel's wife, desires a child. Desperate, Adrien sneaks into Carrega's house and forces him at gunpoint to help him track down Maurel. Carrega reveals that he was dismissed from the Gendarmerie due to his obsession with Maurel, but, using his remaining contacts, he is able to find Maurel's last location. Meanwhile, Linné has come under increasing pressure to recapture Adrien now that Maurel has framed him. She hesitates once again when she finds Adrien at Carrega's house, and she is demoted to desk duty. Adrien does not escape unscathed, and he is shot in the side when Carrega returns to rescue him.

Carrega is critically injured when he breaks a police barricade, and he urges Adrien to abandon him. Adrien tracks Maurel on foot, and Linné researches Adrien, Carrega, and Maurel, whom she comes to believe is responsible for a recent rape. Her superior mocks her "feminine intuition" and refuses to investigate Maurel, so Linné confronts him alone. Adrien and Linné converge on Maurel's house at the same time, and Linné chooses to trust Adrien over Maurel during a standoff. Maurel wounds Linné and chases after Adrien, who has escaped with Amélie. Before Maurel can finish off Adrien, Linné kills Maurel. However, the father of one of Maurel's victims shoots Adrien in the mistaken belief that Adrien is the rapist. Adrien falls off a cliff and disappears. In the epilogue, Amélie receives a letter that is implied to be from her father.

== Cast ==
- Albert Dupontel as Franck Adrien
- Alice Taglioni as Claire Linné
- Stéphane Debac as Jean-Louis Maurel
- Natacha Régnier as Christine Maurel
- Sergi López as Manuel Carrega
- Caterina Murino as Anna Adrien
- Zinedine Soualem as Lucciani
- Lucien Jean-Baptiste as Alex
- Serge Hazanavicius as Lafay
- Jean-Marie Winling as Pascaud
- Jaïa Caltagirone as Amélie
- Claire Bouanich as Melissa
- Hugo Becker as The hitchhiker

== Release ==
The Prey was released in France on 13 April 2011. Cohen Media Group released La Proie in the United States on 6 June 2013, where it grossed $13,959.

== Reception ==
As of June 2020, the film holds a 70% approval rating on review aggregator website Rotten Tomatoes, based on 23 reviews with an average rating of 6.05 out of 10. Metacritic, which assigns a normalized score, rated it 58/100 based on 12 reviews. Xan Brooks of The Guardian rated it 2/5 stars and called it derivative of The Fugitive, Seven, and Tell No One. Manohla Dargis of The New York Times called it a "ridiculously diverting" film that "shouldn't work yet does." Robert Abele of the Los Angeles Times called it "a model of breathless efficiency". David Fear of Time Out New York rated it 3/5 stars and wrote that the film does not fully exploit star Dupontel's charisma in such a derivative story. Anna Smith of Time Out London wrote that the film's derivative and increasingly unbelievable script causes it to degenerate into a Jason Statham or Steven Seagal style B movie. Tom Dawson of Total Film rated it 2/5 stars and called it a clichéd, ludicrous thriller. Justin Chang of Variety wrote, "Anchored by Albert Dupontel's impressive turn, this giddily implausible crime yarn barrels ahead with a propulsive sense of energy." Jordan Mintzer of The Hollywood Reporter described the film as having "a flawed script and a barrage of action film clichés."

== Remake ==
Steven Spielberg is attached to a possible American remake. Le Figaro named Liam Neeson and Jason Statham as possible stars.
