= The Canterville Ghost (2016 film) =

- Film poster
- Le Fantôme de Canterville
- Directed by: Yann Samuell
- Screenplay by: Yves Marmion
- Based on: "The Canterville Ghost"; 1887 short story by Oscar Wilde
- Produced by: Yves Marmion
- Starring: Audrey Fleurot; Michaël Youn; Michèle Laroque; Lionnel Astier
- Cinematography: Antoine Roch
- Edited by: Yann Samuell
- Music by: Matthieu Gonet
- Production companies: Les Films du 24; Umedia
- Distributed by: UGC Distribution (France)
- Release dates: 29 January 2016 (Gérardmer); 6 April 2016 (France)
- Running time: 92 minutes
- Countries: France; Belgium
- Language: French
- Budget: $14 million
- Box office: $1.9 million

The Canterville Ghost (original title: Le Fantôme de Canterville) is a 2016 French-Belgian family comedy film directed and edited by Yann Samuell. The film is based on a 1887 short story of the same name by Oscar Wilde.

== Plot summary ==
Set deep in the legendary landscapes of Brittany, the ghost of Aliénor de Canterville is condemned to haunt her ancestral castle and drive away every newcomer who dares take up residence. She fulfils this mission flawlessly, aided by Gwilherm, her loyal servant. Everything changes, however, when the Otis family — fleeing life in Paris — purchase the castle. Aliénor is dismayed to find she cannot frighten this twenty-first-century family: the children mock her openly and the parents remain entirely oblivious to her presence. Only fifteen-year-old Virginia Otis, moved by the ghost's plight, sets out to free Aliénor from the curse that binds her.

== Cast ==
- Audrey Fleurot as Aliénor de Canterville
- Michaël Youn as Gwilherm
- Michèle Laroque as Elisabeth Otis
- Lionnel Astier as Alain Otis
- Mathilde Daffe as Virginia Otis
- Julien Frison as Erwan
