= The After =

2014 American science fiction drama pilot

- Genre: Science fiction; Drama; Mystery
- Created by: Chris Carter
- Starring: Sharon Lawrence; Adrian Pasdar; Jamie Kennedy; Aldis Hodge; Jaina Lee Ortiz; Andrew Howard; Louise Monot; Arielle Kebbel; Sam Littlefield
- Theme music composer: John Debney
- Country of origin: United States
- Original language: English
- No. of episodes: 1

Production
- Producer: Cyrus Yavneh
- Cinematography: Nelson Cragg
- Running time: 54 mins

Original release
- Release: February 6, 2014

The After is an American science fiction drama pilot created by Chris Carter for Amazon Studios. Along with Bosch, the premiere episode was one of two drama pilots Amazon released online in February 2014. Viewers were allowed to offer their opinions about the pilot before the studio decided whether or not to place a series order.

The pilot was ordered in August 2013 and made available for free online viewing beginning on February 6, 2014. On March 12, Amazon ordered The After to series. The first season would have consisted of eight episodes, released in four two-hour installments. On January 5, 2015, Amazon canceled the show without shooting another episode beyond the pilot.

== Premise ==
Although story elements were kept mostly under wraps, Amazon described the series as a post-apocalyptic drama centered on eight strangers who must work together in order to survive in a violent, unpredictable new world.

== Cast ==
- Aldis Hodge as Dee
- Andrew Howard as McCormack
- Arielle Kebbel as Tammy
- Jamie Kennedy as Dave
- Sharon Lawrence as Francis
- Sam Littlefield as Dark Shadow
- Louise Monot as Gigi
- Jaina Lee Ortiz as Marly Muñoz
- Adrian Pasdar as Wade

== Production ==
The After was first announced in August 2013, breaking creator Chris Carter's 11-year absence from television after the conclusion of The X-Files. The pilot was originally made available on Amazon on February 6, 2014 and viewers were able to assess the final product and offer feedback before the studio made a final decision about a series pick-up. The After subsequently received an eight episode order for the first season, which would have premiered in February 2015.

Carter stated that he hoped the series would run for a total of 99 episodes, and that he used Dante Alighieri's epic poem The Divine Comedy (which features exactly 99 cantos) as his model for the show. In January 2015, Amazon Studios cancelled the order of the series.

Following the show's abrupt cancellation, Carter said: "It might have taken us 11 years to make 99 episodes, in my mind. But I wanted to do The Inferno or, as I should say, all of Dante. That was my approach: to try to mimic the 99 cantos. It was a tough sell. It was eight characters in hell, basically. I think that’s the reason we parted ways." He also cited creative differences with Amazon's executives saying: "With "The After" I wanted to do Dante, I wanted to do the "Inferno" and it's not a genre piece and so what's scary to people is if it's something they don't recognize. If it's something new or something original. And of course when something original works, then everyone wants to copy it. But if you're trying to do something that no one's ever seen before it's frightening. And I can understand that."

During The X-Files revival promotion, Carter said: "I think there was just a difference of opinion about the direction of the show. It was a hard sell from the beginning. It was eight characters in hell, and I really didn’t do a bible for the show because I wanted to discover what that was about. It was a hard sell, and it would have been an investment for them, if they were going to do eight episodes, of $40 million. I can understand their reluctance, and I still think I had eight great episodes."

Roy Price, Amazon's chief also said a similar statement about the show: "Not everything works out. It wasn't the money. It was a tough concept, and hard to crack. Who knows, maybe it will come together one day?"
