= Stéphane Debac =

French actor

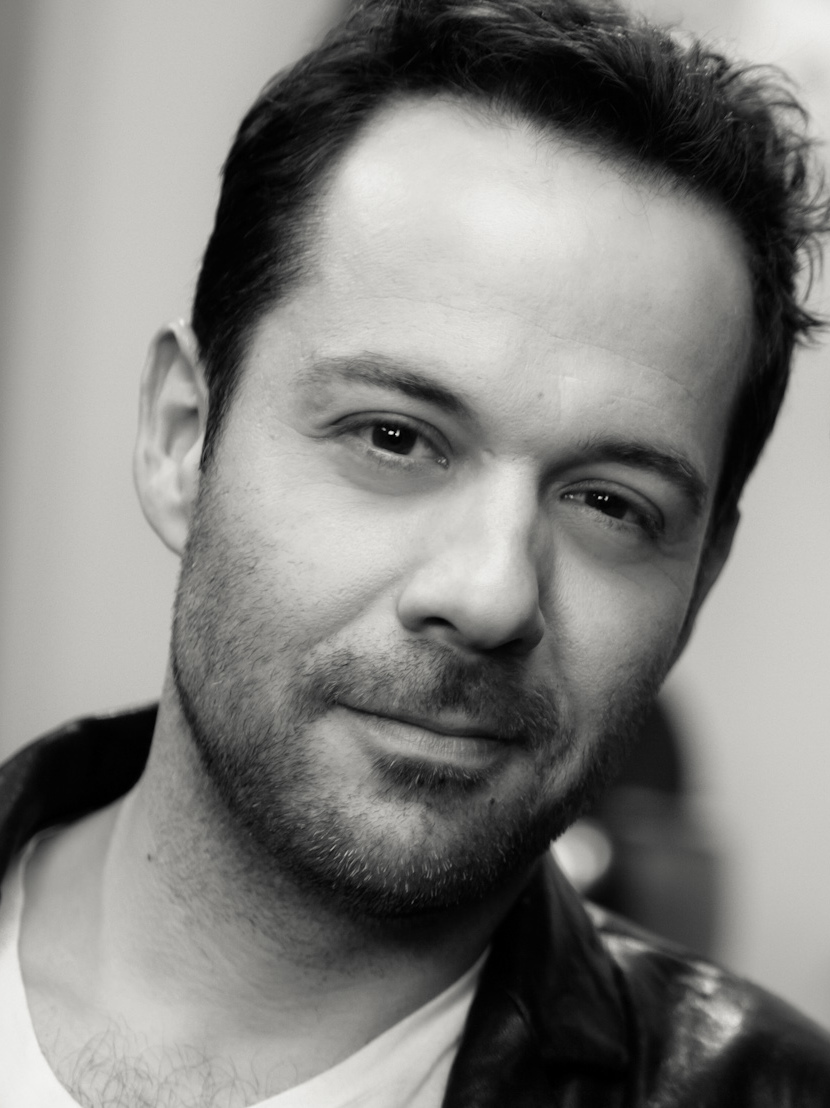
- Debac in 2011
- Born: 23 October 1973 (age 52); Lyon, France
- Occupation: Actor
- Years active: 1999-present

Stéphane Debac (born 23 October 1973) is a French actor, best known for his acting debut as Jerome for South Korean Dogme 95 film Interview (2000), and played as 'Albert Mulveau' in the French TV series Résistance.

== Career ==
He was born on 23 October 1973 in Lyon, France. Debac has appeared in several French films.

== Filmography ==
Year	Title	Role	Director	Notes
2000	Interview	Jerome	Daniel H. Byun	
2002	Vérité oblige	Stéphane Brenner	Claude-Michel Rome	TV series (1 episode)
2003	Toute ma vie j'ai rêvé...	Lolo	Jean-Christophe Barc	Short
2003	Clémence	A party man	Pascal Chaumeil	TV movie
2003	Blague à part		Pascal Chaumeil (2)	TV series (1 episode)
2004	L'incruste	Sandra	Alexandre Castagnetti & Corentin Julius	
2004	Dans la tête du tueur	Jérémie Nordais	Claude-Michel Rome (2)	TV movie
2005	Spiral	Paul	Pascal Chaumeil (3)	TV series (1 episode)
2006	Comedy of Power	The cop	Claude Chabrol	
2006	Capitaine Casta	Poirier	Joyce Buñuel	TV movie
2006	L'affaire Villemin	Judge Bertrand	Raoul Peck	TV mini-series
2007	Mr. Bean's Holiday	Traffic Controller	Steve Bendelack	
2007	A Girl Cut in Two	Antoine Volte	Claude Chabrol (2)	
2007	La 17ème marche	Le Nerd	Karim Adda	Short
2007	Les Fiches Safari		Carole Lambert	Short
2007	Sœur Thérèse.com	Denis Perrin	Vincenzo Marano	TV series (1 episode)
2007	Alice & Charlie	Julien Dernot	Julien Seri	TV series (1 episode)
2007	La commune	Alexandre Vincent	Philippe Triboit	TV series (6 episodes)
2008	Paris 36	The Social Services Inspector	Christophe Barratier	
2008	The Happening	French Bicyclist	M. Night Shyamalan	
2008	Modern Love	Jérôme	Stéphane Kazandjian	
2008	Des obsèques de principe	Henri	Philibert Bacot	Short
2008	Palizzi	Cyril	Stéphane Debac	TV series (4 episodes)
2009	Rose et noir	Myosothis	Gérard Jugnot	
2009	Une nuit qu'il était à se morfondre...	Nanosh	Cyril Paris	Short
2009	Aveugle mais pas trop	Alfred	Charlotte Brandström	TV movie
2009	Vénus & Apollon	Ruibert	Pascal Lahmani	TV series (1 episode)
2010	Djinns	Durieux	Hugues & Sandra Martin	
2010	Les Edelweiss	Philippe	Stéphane Kappes	TV series (1 episode)
2011	La Croisière	Diego	Pascale Pouzadoux	
2011	The Prey	Jean-Louis Maurel	Eric Valette	
2013	Girl on a Bicycle	Francois	Jeremy Leven	
2013	Loulou, l'incroyable secret	Tom	Eric Omond	
2014	Dans la forêt lointaine	Marsand	Ronan Tronchot	Short
2014	Resistance	Albert Mulveau	Miguel Courtois, David Delrieux, ...	TV mini-series
2014	Une famille formidable	The scammer	Alexandre Pidoux	TV series (1 episode)
2015	The Disappearance	Mathias Tellier	Charlotte Brandström (2)	TV mini-series
2015	The Bureau	Jérome	Mathieu Demy, Hélier Cisterne, ...	TV series (3 episodes)
2016	Don't Tell Her	David	Solange Cicurel	
2016	Dans l'ombre du tueur	Arthur Moreau	Eric Valette (2)	TV mini-series
2017	Le serpent aux mille coupures	Jean-François Neri	Eric Valette (3)	
2017	To Each, Her Own	Eric Taieb	Myriam Aziza	TV movie
