= Un village français =

French television drama series

- Created by: Frédéric Krivine; Philippe Triboit; Emmanuel Daucé
- Starring: Robin Renucci; Audrey Fleurot; Marie Kremer; Francis Renaud; Nicolas Gob and others
- Country of origin: France
- Original languages: French; German
- No. of seasons: 7
- No. of episodes: 72

Production
- Running time: 42–55 minutes

Original release
- Network: France 3
- Release: 4 June 2009 – 30 November 2017

Un village français (A French Village) is a French television drama series created by chief writer Frédéric Krivine and principal director Philippe Triboit, with the assistance of historical consultant Jean-Pierre Azéma. It is set in Villeneuve, a fictional commune in the Jura in German-occupied France during the Second World War, and represents, according to the New York Times, "the first major French television series seriously to address collaboration during the Nazi occupation in World War II."

The series was first broadcast on France 3 in June 2009, and has also been shown in Belgium, Switzerland and Canada on TV5 Monde and on MBC in South Korea. In the USA it has been shown on the French language entertainment network TV5MONDE, the MHz Choice streaming service (through Amazon Prime) and Hulu, or for free on some PBS stations. As of February 2025, the series is streaming in the United Kingdom on ITVX under the title The Line.

It is noteworthy that this series inspired Star Wars, specifically season 2 of the series Andor.

== Synopsis ==
In June 1940, German military forces invade the fictional village of Villeneuve, near the French-Swiss border in the department (province) of Jura, France. The village is put into disarray by the occupying German military, which quickly takes control of all aspects of Villeneuve life, including the subjugation of the local government and police. During the invasion, many residents are either killed or wounded, but the survivors attempt to rebuild from the carnage and try to make sense of the German occupation and the new order that has descended upon their village.

Over the course of the series, viewers witness the evolution of main characters and a variety of minor and recurring characters, as they resist, adapt or collaborate to varying degrees with the occupying German forces with a strong Gestapo presence. The series also presents the perspective of an SS officer, Heinrich Müller, a German who investigates acts of resistance and helps to administer and enforce German rule in the village, as the series's main antagonist.

Stories are set almost exclusively in and around Villeneuve at locations like the school, private residences, police headquarters, German military and SS headquarters, brothel, government offices, local businesses, and surrounding farms and countryside.

Both main and supporting characters' individual loyalties, friendships, morals, and family ties are routinely put to the test as a result of greed, hunger, violence, antisemitism, power struggles, and unseen events occurring during World War II as the village's resources and manpower are increasingly diverted towards supporting the German war effort.

All political dissent and resistance by the occupied villagers is brutally repressed by certain members of the Villeneuve police, the newly formed Milice and the Gestapo, which uses coercion, torture and murder to achieve their goal of a subdued populace they view as inferior. The Gestapo and German military leaders also engage in rounding up the village's Jewish population for deportation to foreign ghettos and concentration camps by putting pressure upon the local police and political leaders to meet strict Jewish deportation quotas.

Other story lines focus upon the formation and coalescence of disparate French resistance groups in the area including the local communist party, resistance fighters, French Forces of the Interior, police sympathetic to the cause and a ragtag group of inexperienced fighters hiding in the surrounding wooded areas, primarily disaffected youths fleeing the German policy of Service du travail obligatoire, a forced labour program that provides manpower for factories based in Germany. In season 6 (1944), after the Allies liberate Paris, the French resistance makes contact with members of the US Army working behind enemy lines and begins to cooperate directly with the Allies to help sabotage German military operations.

== Cast members ==
=== Main cast (in alphabetical order) ===
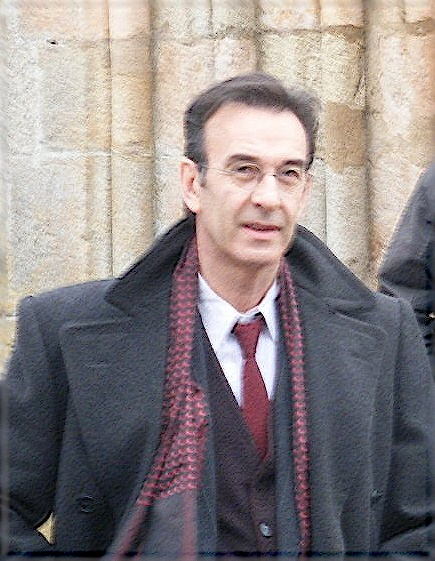
Robin Renucci, in costume as Daniel Larcher.

Actor	Role	Duration
Emmanuelle Bach	Jeannine Schwartz	Season 1–7
Patrick Descamps	Henri De Kervern	Season 1–4, 6-7
Nade Dieu	Marie Germain	Season 1–6
Audrey Fleurot	Hortense Larcher	Season 1–7
Nicolas Gob	Jean Marchetti	Season 1–7
Thierry Godard	Raymond Schwartz	Season 1–7
Marie Kremer	Lucienne Borderie	Season 1–7
Francois Loriquet	Jules Beriot	Season 1-7
Robin Renucci	Daniel Larcher	Season 1–7
Fabrizio Rongione	Marcel Larcher	Season 1–5
Richard Sammel	Heinrich Müller	Season 2–7

=== Recurring cast (in alphabetical order) ===
Actor	Role	Duration
Laurent Bateau	Albert Crémieux	Season 3–4
Bernard Blancan	Anselme	Season 4–7
Nathalie Cerda	Madame Morhange	Season 1–4
Cyril Couton	Servier	Season 1-7
Cyril Descours	Yvon	Season 3
Armelle Deutsch	Natacha	Season 1
Amandine Dewasmes	Marguerite	Season 5
Constance Dollé	Suzanne Richard	Season 1–7
Maxim Driesen	Gustave Larcher	Season 1–7
Dan Herzberg	Lorrain Germain	Season 1–2
Martin Loizillon	Antoine	Season 5–7
Axelle Maricq	Rita de Witte	Season 4, 6-7
Annie Mercier	Edith	Season 4
Maëva Pasquali	Émilie	Season 2–3
Francis Renaud	Jacques	Season 1
Philippe Résimont	Philippe Chassagne	Season 4–6
Laura Stainkrycer	Sarah	Season 1–4
Samuel Theis	Kurt Wagner	Season 1–3, 6

=== Guest (in alphabetical order) ===
Actor	Role	Duration
Grégory Gadebois	Garnier	1 Episode

== Production ==
Jean-Philippe Amar directed 23 episodes, Philippe Triboit directed 16 episodes, Patrice Martineau directed 13 episodes, Jean-Marc Brondolo directed 12 episodes, and Olivier Guignard directed the 6 first episodes of the TV series.
