= Girl on a Bicycle (film) =

2013 film by Jeremy Leven

- Theatrical release poster
- Directed by: Jeremy Leven
- Written by: Jeremy Leven
- Produced by: Quirin Berg; Max Wiedemann
- Starring: Vincenzo Amato; Nora Tschirner; Paddy Considine; Louise Monot; Stéphane Debac
- Cinematography: Robert Fraisse
- Edited by: Michael Trent
- Music by: Craig Richey
- Production company: Wiedemann & Berg Filmproduktion
- Distributed by: Warner Bros. Pictures
- Release date: 7 March 2013
- Running time: 96 minutes
- Country: Germany
- Language: English

Girl on a Bicycle (German: Liebe und andere Turbulenzen; "Love and Other Turbulence") is a 2013 English-language German independent romantic comedy written and directed by Jeremy Leven, produced by Quirin Berg and Max Wiedemann, and starring Vincenzo Amato, Nora Tschirner, Paddy Considine, Louise Monot, and Stéphane Debac. Girl on a Bicycle was filmed in Munich, Bavaria, Germany, and Paris, France.

== Plot ==
Paolo, an Italian who drives a Paris tour bus, has just proposed to his true love, German stewardess, Greta, when a young French beauty, Cécile pulls up beside his bus on her bicycle – and, in short order, Paolo, following some very bad advice from his friend, Derek, finds himself with a German fiancée, a French "wife", two Australian children who call him "Papa", and his life upside-down.

== Cast ==
- Nora Tschirner as Greta
- Vincenzo Amato as Paolo
- Paddy Considine as Derek
- Louise Monot as Cecile
- Christine Citti as Dominique
- Stéphane Debac as Francois
- Chiara de Luca as Police woman

== Production ==
Girl on a Bicycle is written and directed by Jeremy Leven (screenwriter of The Notebook), and produced by Quirin Berg and Max Wiedemann (producers of The Lives of Others). It was filmed in Munich and Paris.

== Release ==
Warner Bros. Pictures released the film in Germany in Spring 2013. In June 2013, Monterey Media bought the United States distribution rights and has released the film in the United States in Fall 2013.

Girl on a Bicycle was selected to screen at the following film festivals:

- 2013 Austin Film Festival
- 2013 Ft Lauderdale International Film Festival
- 2013 Daytona Beach Film Festival
- 2014 Sedona Film Festival

== Reception ==
On review aggregator website Rotten Tomatoes, Girl on a Bicycle has an approval rating of 8% based on 12 reviews, with an average rating of 3.30/10. On Metacritic, the film has a weighted average score of 32 out of 100 based on 10 reviews, indicating "generally unfavorable reviews".

Tom Long of The Detroit News have said that "Stupidity is an international condition. How reassuring", while Odie Henderson of RogerEbert.com gave it a half star and said that "[the film] may be the worst romantic comedy I have ever seen, and this is not hyperbole".

According to Sheri Linden of Los Angeles Times, the film is "more of a foolish plod than a weightless rollick".
