= The Singularity (Agents of S.H.I.E.L.D.) =

- Agents of S.H.I.E.L.D. episode
- Episode no.: Season 3 Episode 18
- Directed by: Garry A. Brown
- Written by: Lauren LeFranc
- Cinematography by: Allan Westbrook
- Editing by: Eric Litman
- Original air date: April 26, 2016
- Running time: 43 minutes

Guest appearances
- John Hannah as Holden Radcliffe; Axle Whitehead as James / Hellfire; Camille De Pazzis as Anon; Adrian Pasdar as Glenn Talbot; Alicia Vela-Bailey as Alisha Whitley

Episode chronology
← Previous "The Team"	Next → "Failed Experiments"
- Agents of S.H.I.E.L.D. season 3

"The Singularity" is the eighteenth episode of the third season of the American television series Agents of S.H.I.E.L.D. Based on the Marvel Comics organization S.H.I.E.L.D., it follows Phil Coulson and his team of S.H.I.E.L.D. agents as they attempt to defeat Hive. It is set in the Marvel Cinematic Universe (MCU) and acknowledges the franchise's films. The episode was written by Lauren LeFranc, and directed by Garry A. Brown.

Clark Gregg reprises his role as Coulson from the film series, and is joined by series regulars Ming-Na Wen, Brett Dalton, Chloe Bennet, Iain De Caestecker, Elizabeth Henstridge, Henry Simmons, and Luke Mitchell.

"The Singularity" originally aired on ABC on April 26, 2016, and according to Nielsen Media Research, was watched by 3.22 million viewers.

== Plot ==
S.H.I.E.L.D. scrambles to repair the damage Daisy Johnson did to the base, while Phil Coulson, who sustained a leg injury, resolves to defeat Hive and save Daisy. Leo Fitz, Jemma Simmons and Lincoln Campbell determine that the effect of Hive's infection will prevent those Inhumans he controls from being sedated. Realizing Alisha Whitley would be a powerful asset to Hive, Coulson, Melinda May and Lincoln visit her, where Coulson orders Lincoln to wear a vest that will self-destruct if he is infected, after which May chastises him for his hypocrisy. Lincoln speaks with Alisha, only to find she has already been infected and has gone with Hive, leaving her duplicates to attack them. After he unintentionally causes Alisha's duplicates to die, Coulson orders Lincoln to stay out of the field until they have a cure for Hive's infection.

Hive and Daisy approach James, revealing they know he has another Kree artifact connected to the orb, which Hive describes as the only thing that can destroy him. They induce his Terrigenesis, giving him the ability to explosively charge objects (in a similar manner to an Extremis combustion), and Hive enthralls him, learning he buried the companion artifact beneath his home. Daisy's use of her seismokinetic powers to unearth the artifact attracts the attention of S.H.I.E.L.D., and Coulson and May arrive to find the Inhumans already gone, along with the artifact. The hut is destroyed by a planted bomb, but Coulson protects himself and May with an energy shield projected from his robotic hand.

Meanwhile, Fitz, Simmons and Alphonso "Mack" Mackenzie decide to seek out Holden Radcliffe, who was in charge of Transia's work against invasive organisms, before he was fired for his transhumanist beliefs. While continuing to discuss how to proceed with their relationship, Fitz and Simmons infiltrate a transhumanist social club to find Radcliffe, under the guise of geneticists wanting to sell him eye prosthetic technology based on those used for Project Deathlok. Upon meeting Radcliffe they reveal their true intentions and ask for his help to devise a cure for Hive's infection, but they are interrupted by the arrival of Hive himself and his Inhuman allies. Alisha abducts Radcliffe, while Daisy subdues Fitz with her powers and warns him of her vision of an agent's death, wanting S.H.I.E.L.D. to stop trying to combat Hive, and avoid that future from coming to pass. Mack narrowly escapes James, and Hive approaches Simmons, speaking to her as Will Daniels, using his memories, only for her to shoot him and escape, after deriding him for trying to be someone he murdered. The three agents reconvene at a hotel, where Fitz and Simmons finally consummate their relationship.

Under Coulson's direction, Glenn Talbot and the Advanced Threat Containment Unit (ATCU) use information Gideon Malick provided before his death to neutralize what is left of Hydra, with the exception of the forces commanded by Hive.

In an end tag, Hive brings Daisy, Radcliffe, Alisha, and James (who has chosen the moniker "Hellfire") to a town he bought with Malick's money. Seeking to make Earth "the home Inhumans deserve", he reveals his intention to recreate the original Kree experiments and convert the entire human race into Inhumans, with Radcliffe's medical and scientific help.

== Production ==
=== Development ===
In April 2016, Marvel announced that the eighteenth episode of the season would be titled "The Singularity", to be written by Lauren LeFranc, with Garry A. Brown directing.

=== Casting ===
In April 2016, Marvel revealed that main cast members Clark Gregg, Ming-Na Wen, Brett Dalton, Chloe Bennet, Iain De Caestecker, Elizabeth Henstridge, Nick Blood, Adrianne Palicki, Henry Simmons, and Luke Mitchell would star as Phil Coulson, Melinda May, Hive, Daisy Johnson, Leo Fitz, Jemma Simmons, Lance Hunter, Bobbi Morse, Alphonso "Mack" Mackenzie, and Lincoln Campbell, respectively. It was also revealed that the guest cast for the episode would include Axle Whitehead as James, John Hannah as Holden Radcliffe, Alicia Vela-Bailey as Alisha, Adrian Pasdar as Brigadier General Glenn Talbot, Alexander Wraith as Agent Anderson, Camille De Pazzis as Anon and Rudy Dobrev as bartender. Vela-Bailey, Wraith, and Dobrev did not receive guest star credit in the episode. Whitehead, Vela-Bailey, Pasdar, and Wraith reprise their roles from earlier in the series. Blood and Palicki do not ultimately appear.

=== Filming ===
For the episode's opening long take shot, the cameraman wore a wire rig usually reserved for actors and stunt doubles so he could be maneuvered around and above the set.

== Broadcast ==
"The Singularity" was first aired in the United States on ABC on April 26, 2016.

== Reception ==
=== Ratings ===
In the United States the episode received a 1.0/3 percent share among adults between the ages of 18 and 49, meaning that it was seen by 1.0 percent of all households, and 3 percent of all of those watching television at the time of the broadcast. It was watched by 3.22 million viewers.
