= La vie devant nous =

French television series

- Created by: Vincenzo Marano
- Starring: Gianni Giardinelli; Marie Mouté; Samuel Perche; Louise Monot; Camille De Pazzis; Elodie Yung
- Country of origin: France
- No. of episodes: 52

Production
- Running time: 60 minutes

Original release
- Network: TF1, TF6, NT1
- Release: July 6, 2002 – 2003

La vie devant nous was the most popular teenage drama in France about a group of high school friends growing up, falling in love, fighting, dealing with troubles, exploring their sexuality and more.

== Cast ==
- Gianni Giardinelli : Stanislas de Courbel
- Marie Mouté : Alizé Guillaume
- Louise Monot : Marine Lavor
- Samuel Perche : Constant de Courbel
- Camille De Pazzis : Ines Guérin
- Guillaume Delorme : Barthélémy Berger
- Caroline Berg : Mme Lavalette
- Stéphane Boucher : M. Moreau
- Chad Chenouga : M. Salmi
- Edgar Givry : M. Antoine de Courbel
- Xavier Lafitte : Gaël Venturi
- Micaelle Mee-Sook : Mère de Jade
- Anne-Marie Pisani : La voyante
- Myriam Roussel : Mme Marie Berger
- Alice Taglioni : Irène
- Élodie Yung : Jade Perrin
- Delphine Chanéac : Pauline
- Marine Danaux : Adèle
- Sophie Michaud : Mme de Courbel
- Xavier Laurent: Mathias Granier
- Daniel Russo: Daniel
- Julie de Bona: Éloïse
- Nadège Beausson-Diagne

== Crew ==
- Creator : Vincenzo Marano
- Executive Producer: Hugues Nonn
- Production: Adélaïde Productions

== Episodes ==
1. Les rebelles
2. Marine
3. Stan baby-sitter
4. Harcèlement
5. L'adoption
6. Le producteur
7. Comme un grand
8. Poudre aux yeux
9. Bac blanc
10. Confusions
11. Le retour
12. Voyance
13. Meilleurs vœux
14. Le film
15. Concours de circonstances
16. Saint-Valentin
17. Le fait accompli
18. Place blanche
19. Le Bulletin
20. Liaison interdite
21. Un jeu cruel
22. Partir, revenir
23. Usurpation d'identité
24. La maladie de Barthe
25. Rien ne sert de courir
26. Vérité ou mensonge
27. Sous location
28. Pour le meilleur et pour le pire
29. Arrestation
30. La vie continue
31. Tout un roman
32. La journée de la femme
33. Dérapage
34. Révolte
35. Machination
36. Révisions
37. Une semaine mouvementée
38. L'épreuve de français
39. Rentrée
40. Échec et mat
41. Duelles
42. Le mal par le mal
43. Crise d'identité
44. Au pied du mur
45. Censure
46. Un homme de cœur
47. L'arnaque
48. Tel père, tel fils
49. Star système
50. Ma mère
51. Trahison
52. Les lauréats
