= Marie Mouté =

French actress (born 1983)

- Born: Marie Mouté; France
- Years active: 2002–present

Marie Mouté (also billed as Moute) is a Swiss-French actress best known for starring in the French TV-series La vie devant nous, from 2002 to 2006.

== Career ==
Marie Mouté started her career by starring the French TV series La vie devant nous, following the life of young teenagers in an upscale high school in Paris.

Mouté has led other French mini-series such as Le temps meurtrier in 2004,Chez Maupassant in 2007, le Gendre ideal 2 in 2009.

She also appeared in several film features, including And Then it Breaks (directed by Anne Dudek and Leslie Porter, 2006), Travaux, on sait quand ça commence...(directed by Brigitte Rouan, 2005, English title: Housewarming), Comme les cinq doigts de la main directed by Alexandre Arcady in 2010

Since 2012, she stars a new cop show Mongeville for France 3 public French television network.

In 2013, she was cast to play Gerard Depardieu's daughter in Welcome to New York directed by Abel Ferrara which follows the incidents leading up to the 2011 New-York hotel maid scandal that marred the former International Monetary Fund chief Dominique Strauss-Kahn's career and political aspirations.

== Filmography ==
| Year | Title | Role | Notes |
|---|---|---|---|
| 2014 | Welcome to New York | Sophie Devereaux | dir: Abel Ferrara |
| 2013 | Mongeville 2,3 | Lieutenant Axelle Ferrano | TV series- France 3- Filming |
| 2012 | Mongeville 1 | Lieutenant Axelle Ferrano | TV series- France 3- Filming |
| 2011 | Drole de famille 2 | Alice | TV mini-series- France 2 |
| 2010 | Comme les cinq doigts de la main | Irene Stano | dir: Alexandre Arcady |
| 2009 | Drole de famille | Alice | TV mini-series- France 2 |
| 2009 | Le gendre ideal 2 | Pauline | TV mini-series -TF1 |
| 2008–2009 | La vie est a nous | Judith | TV series- TF1- (7 episodes) |
| 2008–2009 | Oscar | | Theatre play - international tour |
| 2007 | La chambre 11 | Mademoiselle Juliette | TV collection- Chez Maupassant -France 2 -(1 episode) |
| 2006 | And then it breaks | Carine | dir: Leslie Porter |
| 2005 | Joséphine, ange gardien | Juliette | TV series- TF1 - (1 episode : "Noble cause") |
| 2005 | Le temps meurtrier | Marie Mazaye | TV mini-series -France3 |
| 2003 | Housewarming | Julie | dir: Brigitte Rouan- selection - Cannes Film Festival 2005 Directors' Fortnight |
| 2003 | La deuxieme verite | Axelle | TV mini-series -France3 |
| 2002–2006 | La vie devant nous | Alize Guilaume | TV series -TF1- (52 episodes) |

== Theatre ==
Mouté played in the famous theatre comedy Oscar by Claude Magnier in 2008 and 2009. The production toured in France, Switzerland, Belgium and Tunis. The play received good reviews by the Palais des Festivals et des Congrès which host arts and festivals in Cannes, where it played in the Theatre Debussy season 2008/2009.
