= Robin Renucci =

French actor and film director

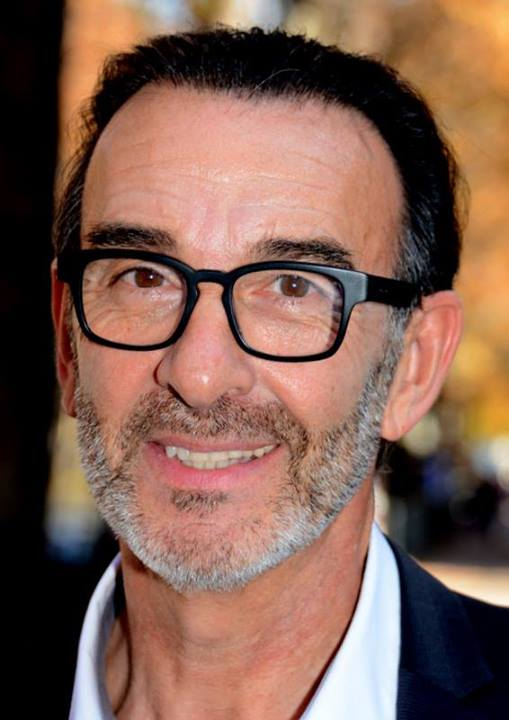
- Born: 11 July 1956 (age 68); Le Creusot, Saône-et-Loire, France
- Occupation(s): • Actor • Screen director
- Years active: 1981–present

Robin Renucci (born 11 July 1956, in Le Creusot, Saône-et-Loire) is a French film and television actor and film director.

== Acting filmography ==
- Eaux profondes (1981) : Ralph
- Les Misérables (1982) : Courfeyrac
- Invitation au voyage (1982) : Gérard
- Escalier C (1984)
- La baston (1985) : René Levasseur
- Masks (1987) : Roland Wolf
- The King's Whore (1990) : Charles de Luynes
- Credit Bonheur (1996) : Paul Choquet
- Children of the Century (1999) : François Buloz
- The Dreamers (2003) : Father
- Arsène Lupin (2004) : Duke of Dreux-Soubise
- Comedy of Power (2006) : Philippe Charmant-Killman
- Dolce Fine Giornata (2019)
- Leonardo (2021) : Piero da Vinci
- Jeanne du Barry (2023) : Dumousseaux

== Television-acting work ==
| Year | Title | Genre | Role | Program type | Notes |
|---|---|---|---|---|---|
| 1996 | Maigret in Finland | drama | Prof. Jean Duclos | television series | |
| Since 2009 | Un village français | drama | Daniel Larcher | television series | |

== Directing filmography ==
| Year | Title | Genre | Notes |
|---|---|---|---|
| 1998 | La femme d'un seul homme | | television film |
| 2007 | Sempre vivu! | | |
