= Christian Faure (director) =

French screenwriter and film director

- Born: 1954; Grignols, Dordogne, France
- Occupation(s): Screenwriter, director
- Years active: 1983–present

Christian Faure (born 1954) is a French screenwriter and film director.

== Filmography ==
Year	Title	Role	Notes
1983	La palombière	Assistant director	Directed by Jean-Pierre Denis
1986	Mauvais Sang	Assistant director	Directed by Leos Carax
1987	Field of Honor	Writer	Directed by Jean-Pierre Denis
1990	Vincent & Theo	Assistant director	Directed by Robert Altman
1991	Dingo	Assistant director	Directed by Rolf de Heer
1991	Série rose	Director	TV series (1 episode)
1994	C'est mon histoire	Director	TV series (1 episode)
1994	Coup de chien	Director	TV movie
1994	Coeur à prendre	Director	TV movie
1994	Ferbac	Director	TV series (1 episode)
1996	Loin des yeux	Director	TV movie
1997	L'enfant perdu	Director	TV movie
1997	L'enfant du bout du monde	Director & writer	TV movie
1998	L'instit	Director	TV series (1 episode)
1998	Fugue en ré	Director	TV movie
2000	Suite en ré	Director	TV movie
2000	Just a Question of Love	Director & writer	TV movie
2001	Les boeuf-carottes	Director	TV series (2 episodes)
2002	La mort est rousse	Director	TV movie
2003	Sœur Thérèse.com	Director	TV series (2 episodes)
2003	T'as voulu voir la mer...	Director	TV movie
2004	Courrier du coeur	Director	TV movie
2005	A Love to Hide	Director	TV movie
2005	Le piège du Père Noël	Director	TV movie
2006	The Poisoner	Director	TV movie
2008	Papillon noir	Director	TV movie Luchon International Film Festival - Best Director
2008	Les hauts murs	Director & writer	
2009	La liste	Director & writer	TV movie
2010	Fais danser la poussière	Director	TV movie Luchon International Film Festival - Audience Award
2010	Mademoiselle Drot	Director	TV movie
2011	Le monde à ses pieds	Director	TV movie
2012	Paradis amers	Director	TV movie
2013	3 Femmes en colère	Director & writer	TV movie
2014	Au nom des fils	Director & writer	TV movie
2014	La loi	Director	TV movie Nominated - Globes de Cristal Award for Best Television Film or Television Series; Nominated - Monte-Carlo Television Festival - Best Television Film
2016	La promesse du feu	Director	TV movie
2019	La promesse de l'eau	Director	TV movie
