= List of LGBTQ-related films of 2000 =

This is a list of lesbian, gay, bisexual, transgender or queer-related films released in 2000. It contains theatrically released films that deal with important gay, lesbian, bisexual, transgender or queer characters or issues and may have same-sex romance or relationships as a plot device.

== Films ==
| Title | Director | Country | Genre | Cast | Notes |
|---|---|---|---|---|---|
| 101 Rent Boys | Fenton Bailey, Randy Barbato | United States | Documentary | | |
| 101 Reykjavík | Baltasar Kormákur | Iceland | Comedy | Victoria Abril, Hilmir Snær Guðnason and Hanna María Karlsdóttir | |
| Before Night Falls | Julian Schnabel | United States | Drama | Javier Bardem, Olivier Martinez, Johnny Depp and Héctor Babenco | Biopic of Reinaldo Arenas, based on his autobiography and the documentary Havana by Jana Boková |
| Benjamin Smoke | Jem Cohen; Peter Sillen | United States | Documentary | | Benjamin Smoke was an American singer-songwriter who fronted the Atlanta, Georgia bands Smoke and the Opal Foxx Quartet. He was a radical, gay rock 'n' roll performer, the documentary spans 10 years of his life. |
| Between Two Women | Steven Woodcock | United Kingdom | Drama | Barbara Marten, Andrina Carroll and Andrew Dunn | |
| Big Eden | Thomas Bezucha | United States | Romance, drama | Arye Gross, Eric Schweig, Tim DeKay, Louise Fletcher, Corinne Bohrer, George Coe and Nan Martin | |
| Billy Elliot | Stephen Daldry | United Kingdom; France | Comedy, drama | Julie Walters, Gary Lewis, Jamie Bell, Jamie Draven, Stuart Wells and Adam Cooper | |
| Borstal Boy | Peter Sheridan | United Kingdom; Ireland | Romance, drama | Shawn Hatosy, Danny Dyer, Lee Ingleby, Michael York, Eva Birthistle, Mark Huberman, Ian McElhinney and Ronnie Drew | Based on the autobiographical novel of the same name by Brendan Behan |
| A Boy Named Sue | Julie Wyman | United States | Documentary | | This is the transition of Theo, a young adult, raised female, involved in a lesbian relationship, who undergoes various stages of a sex reassignment surgery (including a mastectomy and hormone therapy) to become male. |
| The Broken Hearts Club: A Romantic Comedy | Greg Berlanti | United States | Romance, comedy, drama | Zach Braff, Dean Cain, Andrew Keegan, Nia Long, Mary McCormack, Matt McGrath, Timothy Olyphant, Billy Porter, Justin Theroux, Ben Weber and John Mahoney | |
| Burnt Money | Marcelo Piñeyro | Argentina | Crime, thriller | Leonardo Sbaraglia, Eduardo Noriega, Pablo Echarri, Leticia Brédice, Ricardo Bartis, Dolores Fonzi and Carlos Roffé | a.k.a. Plata quemada; based on the novel of the same name by Ricardo Piglia |
| Chuck & Buck | Miguel Arteta | United States | Comedy, drama | Mike White, Chris Weitz, Lupe Ontiveros, Beth Colt and Paul Weitz | |
| Common Ground | Donna Deitch | United States | Drama | Brittany Murphy, Jason Priestley, Steven Weber, Jonathan Taylor Thomas, Edward Asner and James LeGros | |
| Confusion of Genders | Ilan Duran Cohen | France | Romance, comedy, drama | Pascal Greggory, Nathalie Richard, Julie Gayet, Alain Bashung, Cyrille Thouvenin, Vincent Martinez and Marie Saint-Dizier | |
| Daughters of the Sun | Maryam Shahriar | Iran | Drama | Altinay Ghelich Taghani, Soghra Karimi, Zahra Mohammadi and Habib Haddad | |
| Drôle de Félix | Olivier Ducastel, Jacques Martineau | France | Comedy, drama | Sami Bouajila, Patachou, Ariane Ascaride, Pierre-Loup Rajot, Charly Sergue and Maurice Bénichou | aka The Adventures of Felix |
| Eban and Charley | James Bolton | United Kingdom; United States | Drama | Brent Fellows, Gio Black Peter, Nolan V. Chard and Ron Upton | |
| En malas compañías | Antonio Hens | Spain | Short, comedy | Israel Rodríguez, Pablo Puyol, Antonio Álamo, Juan Carlos Rubio and Juanma Lara | aka. In Bad Company, named in English as Doors Cut Down |
| Family Pack (Que faisaient les femmes pendant que l'homme marchait sur la lune?) | Chris Vander Stappen | Belgium, Canada, France, Switzerland | Drama | Marie Bunel, Hélène Vincent, Mimie Mathy, Tsilla Chelton, Macha Grenon, Christian Crahay, Emmanuel Bilodeau | |
| Forbidden Fruit | Sue Maluwa-Bruce | Germany; Zimbabwe | Romance, drama | | Short |
| Get Your Stuff | Max Mitchell | United States | Comedy, drama | Cameron Watson, Anthony Meindl, Elaine Hendrix, Patience Cleveland, Grady Hutt, Blayn Barbosa and Kimberly Scott | |
| The Girl | Sande Zeig | United States; France | Romance, drama | Claire Keim, Agathe De La Boulaye, Cyril Lecomte and Sandra Nkake | |
| If These Walls Could Talk 2 | Jane Anderson, Martha Coolidge, Anne Heche | United States | Romance, drama | Vanessa Redgrave, Chloë Sevigny, Michelle Williams, Sharon Stone and Ellen DeGeneres | |
| The Iron Ladies (Satree lek) | Youngyooth Thongkonthun | Thailand | Comedy | Jesdaporn Pholdee, Sahaphap Tor, Chaicharn Nimpulsawasdi, Giorgio Maiocchi, Ekachai Buranapanit, Kokkorn Benjathikoon, Shiriohana Hongsopon, Phomsit Sitthijamroenkhun, Sutthipong Sitthijamroenkhun and Anucha Chatkaew | Based on a true story of a gay/transgender volleyball team. |
| Johnny Greyeyes | Jorge Manzano | Canada | Drama | Gail Maurice, Columpa Bobb | |
| The Journey of Jared Price | Dustin Lance Black | United States | Romance, comedy, drama | Corey Spears, Josh Jacobson, Rocki Cragg, Steve Tyler | |
| Just a Question of Love | Christian Faure | France; Belgium | Drama | Cyrille Thouvenin, Stéphan Guérin-Tillié, Éva Darlan, Danièle Denie and Idwig Stéphane | |
| Km. 0 | Yolanda García Serrano, Juan Luis Iborra | Spain | Romance, comedy, drama | Mercè Pons, Carlos Fuentes, Elisa Matilla, Alberto San Juan, Silke, Tristán Ulloa, Jesús Cabrero, Concha Velasco, Miquel García Borda, Víctor Ullate, Jr., Cora Tiedra, Georges Corraface, Roberto Álamo and Armando del Río | |
| The Law of Enclosures | John Greyson | Canada | Drama | Sarah Polley, Brendan Fletcher, Diane Ladd, Sean McCann | Based on the novel by Dale Peck |
| The Legend of Rita | Volker Schlöndorff | Germany | Romance, drama | Bibiana Beglau, Nadja Uhl, Martin Wuttke, Harald Schrott, Mario Irrek, Alexander Beyer and Jenny Schily | |
| Marlene | Joseph Vilsmaier | Germany; Italy | Biography, drama, musical | Katja Flint, Herbert Knaup, Heino Ferch, Hans Werner Meyer, Christiane Paul, Suzanne von Borsody and Armin Rohde | Biopic of German actress Marlene Dietrich |
| Mercy | Damian Harris | United States | Mystery, thriller | Ellen Barkin, Wendy Crewson, Peta Wilson, Karen Young, Julian Sands, Stephen Baldwin, Beau Starr and Marshall Bell | Based on the novel of the same name by David L. Lindsey |
| The Monkey's Mask | Samantha Lang | Australia | Crime, thriller | Susie Porter, Kelly McGillis, Abbie Cornish and Marton Csokas | |
| Murderous Maids | Jean-Pierre Denis | France | Crime, drama | Sylvie Testud, Julie-Marie Parmentier, Isabelle Renauld, François Levantal, Dominique Labourier, Jean-Gabriel Nordmann, Marie Donnio and Nadia Barentin | a.k.a. Les blessures assassines; based on the novel L'affaire Papin by Paulette Houdyer, which chronicles the true story of sisters Christine and Léa Papin |
| The Next Best Thing | John Schlesinger | United States | Romance, comedy, drama | Rupert Everett, Madonna, Benjamin Bratt, Michael Vartan, Josef Sommer and Lynn Redgrave | |
| Nico and Dani | Cesc Gay | Spain | Romance, comedy, drama | Fernando Ramallo, Jordi Vilches, Marieta Orozco, Esther Nubiola and Chisco Amado | |
| Once in a Lifetime | Susanne Bier | Denmark; Sweden | Musical, comedy, drama | Helena Bergström, Jonas Karlsson, Björn Kjellman, Thomas Hanzon and Sissela Kyle | |
| Our Lady of the Assassins | Barbet Schroeder | Spain; France; Colombia | Romantic, crime, drama | Germán Jaramillo, Anderson Ballesteros, Juan David Restrepo and Manuel Busquets | aka La virgen de los sicarios |
| Paragraph 175 | Rob Epstein, Jeffrey Friedman | United Kingdom; Germany; United States | Documentary | | Narrated by Rupert Everett |
| The Perfect Son | Leonard Farlinger | Canada | Drama | Colm Feore, David Cubitt, Chandra West, John Boylan and Juan Chioran | |
| The Phantom | João Pedro Rodrigues | Portugal | Drama | Ricardo Meneses, Beatriz Torcato and Andre Barbosa | aka O Fantasma |
| Presque rien | Sébastien Lifshitz | France; Belgium | Romance, drama | Jérémie Elkaïm, Stéphane Rideau and Dominique Reymond | a.k.a. Come Undone and Almost Nothing |
| Punks | Patrik-Ian Polk | United States | Comedy, music | Seth Gilliam, Dwight Ewell, Jazzmun and Renoly Santiago | |
| Red Dirt | Tag Purvis | United States | Romance, drama | Dan Montgomery Jr., Aleksa Palladino, Walton Goggins, Karen Black, Peg O'Keef, Glenn Shadix, Virgil Cunningham and Jo-Ann Robinson | |
| Stardom | Denys Arcand | Canada; France | Drama, comedy | Jessica Paré, Victoria Snow, Jessica Mackenzie, Macha Grenon, Joanne Vannicola, Charles Berling, Sophie Lorain and Dan Aykroyd | |
| The Sea | Agustí Villaronga | Spain | Drama | Roger Casamajor, Bruno Bergonzini, Antònia Torrens, Hernán González, Juli Mira, Simón Andreu and Ángela Molina | a.k.a. El mar; based on a novel by Blai Bonet |
| Sordid Lives | Del Shores | United States | Comedy | Bonnie Bedelia, Delta Burke, Leslie Jordan, Beau Bridges, Beth Grant and Olivia Newton-John | Based on Shores' play of the same name, which includes elements of his real life |
| Things You Can Tell Just by Looking at Her | García Rodrigo | United States | Romance, drama | Glenn Close, Cameron Diaz, Calista Flockhart, Kathy Baker, Amy Brenneman, Valeria Golino, Holly Hunter, Matt Craven, Gregory Hines and Miguel Sandoval | |
| Together | Lukas Moodysson | Sweden; Denmark; Italy | Comedy, drama | Lisa Lindgren, Michael Nyqvist, Emma Samuelsson, Sam Kessel, Gustaf Hammarsten, Jessica Liedberg and Ola Rapace | |
| Urbania | Jon Matthews | United States | Drama, thriller | Dan Futterman, Paige Turco, Samuel Ball, Josh Hamilton, Matt Keeslar and Alan Cumming | Co-written by Daniel Reitz, based on his play Urban Folk Tales |
| Water Drops on Burning Rocks | François Ozon | France | Drama | Bernard Giraudeau, Malik Zidi, Ludivine Sagnier and Anna Levine | Based on Rainer Werner Fassbinder's play Tropfen auf heisse Stene |
| What's Cooking? | Gurinder Chadha | United Kingdom; United States | Comedy, drama | Joan Chen, Julianna Margulies, Mercedes Ruehl, Kyra Sedgwick, Alfre Woodard, Maury Chaykin, Estelle Harris, Dennis Haysbert, Lainie Kazan, Victor Rivers and Douglas Spain | |
| Woman on Top | Fina Torres | United States | Romance, comedy | Penélope Cruz, Murilo Benício, Harold Perrineau Jr. and Mark Feuerstein | |
| Wonder Boys | Curtis Hanson | United States | Comedy, drama | Michael Douglas, Tobey Maguire, Frances McDormand, Katie Holmes, Rip Torn and Robert Downey Jr. | Based on the novel by Michael Chabon |
| Dude, Where's My Car? | Danny Leiner | United States | Comedy, science-fiction | Ashton Kutcher and Seann William Scott | Based on real events |
| But I'm a Cheerleader | Jamie Babbit | United States | Romance | Natasha Lyonne, Clea DuVall, Michelle Williams, RuPaul, Eddie Cibrian, Melanie Lynskey, Cathy Moriarty, Dante Basco | |
