= In a Dark Place =

- Directed by: Donato Rotunno
- Written by: Peter Waddington (screenplay)
- Based on: The Turn of the Screw by Henry James
- Produced by: Andreas Bajohra; Eddy Géradon-Luyckx; Bob Portal; Jan H. Vocke
- Starring: Leelee Sobieski; Tara Fitzgerald; Christian Olson; Gabrielle Adam; Graham Pountney; Jonathan Fox
- Cinematography: Jean-François Hensgens
- Edited by: Joseph Pisano; Simon Reglar
- Music by: Adam Pendse
- Distributed by: Arsenal Pictures; First Look International
- Release date: 2006
- Running time: 95 min.
- Countries: United Kingdom; Luxembourg
- Language: English
- Budget: $5,000,000

In a Dark Place is a 2006 horror film version of Henry James' 1898 novella The Turn of the Screw. Unlike most previous adaptations, it is set in the present day instead of the late 19th century.

== Plot summary ==
Anna Veigh is an art teacher who seems too involved in her students' private lives. She is called into the headmaster's office and chastised for (once again) attempting to be an "art therapist" rather than an art teacher. The headmaster makes inappropriate advances, touching her leg and putting his arm around her as he informs her that she is on "the wrong track". Later, the headmaster calls and leaves a message on her answering machine, revealing that she has been fired and something has occurred in the office that he wishes to "keep secret." He informs her that he has found her a job as a nanny that pays very well.

The next day, she attends an interview for the job and is hired on the spot by the wealthy and mysterious Mr. Laing to become the nanny for his niece and nephew — two wealthy young orphans — whilst he is away on business. It seems a perfect escape for her, a welcome change.

Her new workplace is Bly House, a remote country estate with beautiful grounds and a small resident staff. Miles and Flora, the children, seem sweet and charming, if a little strange, and Anna thinks that she has really 'landed on her feet' after the rigours of her previous job. The only fly in the ointment is the frosty estate manager, Miss Grose, who seems remote and unfriendly to the new arrival.

Anna soon begins to make disquieting discoveries. Miles, the boy, has been expelled from his school for reasons the headmaster will not discuss beyond saying other parents have complained of his influence. Anna hears whispers through the night, often leading towards Flora's bedroom. Anna then learns that her predecessor in the job, one Miss Jessel, drowned in a lake on the property. Her lover, Mr. Quint, hanged himself in Bly House shortly thereafter. The children continue to commit devilish-seeming acts that lead her to question the children. To add to her unease, Anna catches glimpses of unknown, sinister figures lurking in the grounds, but nobody else admits to seeing them.

Anna confronts Miss Grose with her suspicions about the intruders and is surprised to learn that Miss Grose had hated Mr. Quint for stealing her lesbian lover, Miss Jessel. The figures Anna describes are unmistakably those of Miss Jessel and Mr. Quint, but these former employees have been dead for some time. Anna has recurring daydreams concerning her abuse as a child, and she soon suspects that Mr. Quint and Miss Jessel may have physically abused Miles and Flora as well.

As Anna's ghost sightings and fears for the children's safety become more pronounced, Miss Grose begins to doubt Anna's sanity and fires her from her post. As Anna reveals some affection for the estate manager, Miss Grose reconsiders and begins to kiss Anna passionately. While they later sleep together that evening, it is apparent on Anna's face that she is shocked by the estate manager's physical attention and feels that she is again being abused, just as when she was a child. It seems as if Anna is being sexually abused by every character in the movie, highlighting her disturbing childhood.

Eventually, the children grow more and more fearful and sullen around Anna. Anna has hallucinations about having multiple threesomes and foursomes, and therefore her emotional breakdown continues, and Miss Grose once again tells her to leave. Anna frequently visits the lake Miss Jessel had supposedly drowned in, yet tells the children not to go there. She seems possessed and has frequent sightings of Miss Jessel there. It is unclear what is happening after some strange behaviour on the children's and Anna's part. That evening, Flora has a severe fear-induced asthma attack and is taken away by ambulance, never to be seen again. Miles runs away, and before accompanying Flora to the hospital, Miss Grose makes Anna promise to call her as soon as Miles is found.

Anna finds and chases the frightened Miles around the estate, believing only she can rescue him from the ghosts' attentions. As she corners him at the lake where Miss Jessel drowned, Miles, in a sense, 'walks the plank', slowly forcing himself into the water and drops from the log into the shallow creek-like puddle where Miss Jessel's previous body parts had been shown. There is no struggle, and he drowns. Anna tells him that he will now be free of his suffering and that what happened between them will remain a secret. It is suggested that Anna had been physically abusing Miles and Flora just as she had been abused as a child herself, but the truth is, no one knows whether she is insane and imagining these images or being harassed by ghostly figures. Then, without any real explanation or even implication, her face suddenly turns into herself as a little girl and says, "I'm the only one." The viewer is left questioning whether her mind was the 'dark place', or if the house was truly haunted.

== Cast ==
- Leelee Sobieski as Anna Veigh
- Tara Fitzgerald as Miss Grose
- Christian Olson as Miles
- Gabrielle Adam as Flora
- Graham Pountney as Mr. James
- Jonathan Fox as Mr. Laing
- Thomas Sanne as Headmaster
- Patrick Dechesne as Quint
- Gintare Parulyte as Miss Jessel
- Cleo Rotunno as Small girl (young Anna)
