= Cyrille Thouvenin =

French actor (born 1976)

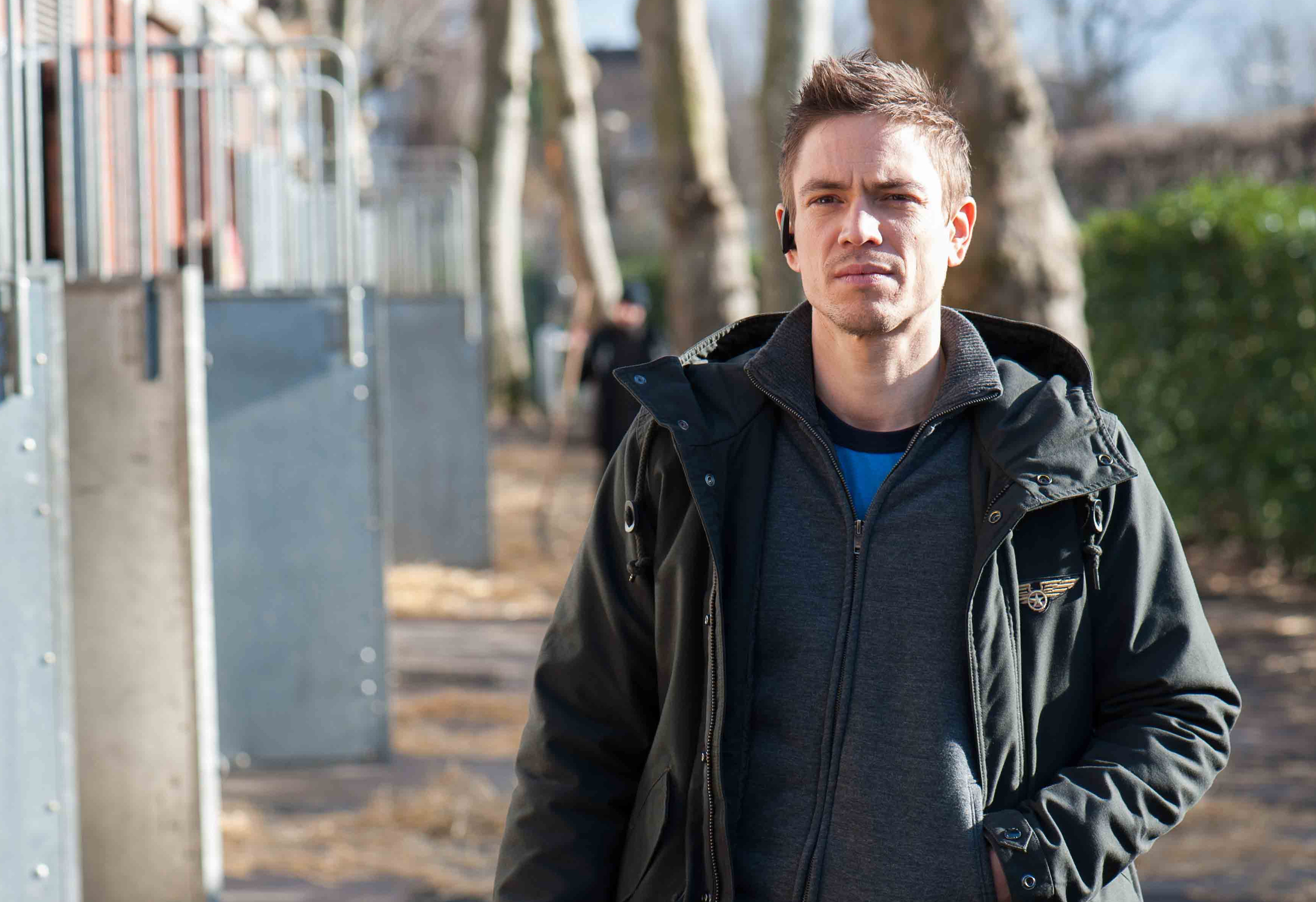
- Born: Cyrille Thouvenin; 15 May 1976 (age 50); France
- Occupation: Actor
- Years active: 1998–present

Cyrille Thouvenin (born 15 May 1976) is a French actor. Former pupil of Cours Florent and a graduate of the National Conservatory of Dramatic Art (class of 2001).

Fascinated by Molière, he started on television and then quickly made his classes at the cinema. He was appointed to Caesars in 2001 as "Most Promising Newcomer" for La Confusion des genres. He followed roles in film and television. He does not forget the theater, and also devoted himself to writing.

In 2011, he co-wrote and directed the show Laurent Lafitte: comme son nom l'indique palais des Glaces and théâtre des Mathurins.

== Personal life ==
He is openly gay.

== Filmography ==
=== Film ===
- 2010 : The philosopher by Abdulla Alkaabi : Léo
- 2009 : Le Village des ombres by Fouad Benhammou : David Fontana
- 2008 : Phénomènes (The Happening) by M. Night Shyamalan : French Bicyclist's Friend
- 2006 : Les Fragments d'Antonin by Gabriel Le Bomin : Stan
- 2005 : Les Âmes grises (film) by Yves Angelo : The soldier amputee brawl
- 2005 : Edy (film) by Stéphan Guérin-Tillié : Antoine
- 2003 : Quelqu'un vous aime... by Emmanuelle Bercot : Yann
- 2002 : Sueurs by Louis-Pascal Couvelaire : Victor
- 2001 : Oui, mais... by Yves Lavandier : Sébastien 'Seb' Douglas
- 2000 : La Confusion des genres by Ilan Duran Cohen : Christophe
- 2000 : In extremis by Étienne Faure : Man in Black 1
- 2000 : Juste une question d'amour by Christian Faure : Laurent

=== Television ===
- 2010 : Des intégrations ordinaires (TV movie) France 2 by Julien Sicard :
- 2010 : Enquêtes réservées (TV series) France 3 by Patrick Dewolf and Clémentine Dabadie – Contre-plongée (Season 2 episodes 7) : Cipriani
- 2010: Sable noir (TV series) Jimmy by Eric Valette, Xavier Gens and Samuel Le Bihan – Les âmes meurtries (Season 2 episodes 3) : Toussaint
- 2009 : Les Petits Meurtres d'Agatha Christie (TV series) France 2 by Éric Woreth – La plume empoisonnée (episodes 3) : father Hector
- 2008 : La Veuve tatouée (TV movie) France 2 by Virginie Sauveur : Vincent
- 2006 : L'Avare (TV movie) France 3 by Christian de Chalonge : Cléante
- 2006 : Pour l'amour de Dieu (TV movie) Arte by Zakia Bouchaâla and Ahmed Bouchaâla : Bilal
- 2003 : Charles II: The Power and The Passion (mini-series) BBC by Joe Wright (épisode 3) : Philippe d’Orléans "Monsieur"
- 2003 : Quelques jours entre nous (TV movie) Arte by Virginie Sauveur : Vincent
- 2003 : Les Parents terribles (TV movie) France 2 by Josée Dayan : Michel "Mick"
- 2003 : Les Liaisons dangereuses (mini-series) France 2 by Josée Dayan : Hugo / Ludovic
- 2001 : L'Interpellation (TV movie) Arte de Marco Pauly : Lionel Brunel
- 2001 : Dérives (TV movie) Arte by Pierre Chosson and Christophe Lamotte : Denis
- 2000 : Un morceau de soleil (TV movie) France 3 by Dominique Cheminal : Martin
- 2000 : Juste une question d'amour (TV movie) France 3 by Christian Faure : Laurent
- 1999 : Madame le proviseur (TV series) France 2 by Jean-Marc Seban – La Saison des bouffons (Season 4 episodes 9) : Le lycée #2
- 1999 : Madame le proviseur (TV series) France 2 by Jean-Marc Seban – L'heure de la sortie (Season 4 episodes 10) : Le lycée #2
- 1999 : Le Choix d’Élodie (TV movie) M6 by Emmanuelle Bercot : Harry
- 1999 : Joséphine, ange gardien (TV series) TF1 by Dominique Baron – La part du doute (Season 2 episodes 2) : Gaël
- 1998 : Quai numéro un (TV series) France 2 by Patrick Jamain – Les cobras (episodes 11) : Snake
- 1998 : Commandant Nerval (mini-series) TF1 by Arnaud Sélignac – Une femme dangereuse (Season 1 episodes 3) : Vincent Cheminal

=== short ===
- 2010 : Ellipse (short) by Lynne Moses: the Rapist/The Boyfriend
- 2009 : L.O.V.E... (short) by Rachel Huet: Jean
- 2004 : Sad Day (short) by Mark Maggiori : Kyo
- 2003 : Signe d'hiver (short) by Jean-Claude Moireau : Vincent
- 2002 : Quelqu'un vous aime (short) by Emmanuelle Bercot : Yann
- 2000 : Un Arabe ouvert (short) by Hervè Lasgouttes: riffraff
- 2001 : Tempus fugit (short) by Yves Piat : Romier

=== Other ===
- 2010 : Guibert cinéma (Documentary) CinéCinéma Club by Anthony Doncque : interpreting texts Hervé Guibert
- 2004 : Jean Cocteau (Documentary) Arte by Pierre Philippe – Jean Cocteau, le passeur : reader of poems
- 2004 : Jean Cocteau (Documentary) Arte by Pierre Philippe – Jean Cocteau, le phénix: reader of poems

== Theater ==
- 2013 : American Blues, de Tennessee Williams, directed by Juliette de Charnacé, Tournée
- 2011 : Hamlet, de William Shakespeare, directed by Jean-Luc Revol, Festival de Grignan
- 2010 : Hymne à l'amour 2, de Scaron, directed by Juliette de Charnacé, MC93 Bobigny
- 2006 : Le Gardien d'Harold Pinter, directed by Didier Long, théâtre de l'Œuvre
- 2005 : Vincent River, pièce de théâtre de Philip Ridley, directed by Jean-Luc Revol, théâtre du Marais
- 2003 : Faust ou la Tragédie du savant directed by Catherine Marnas en tournée
- 2001 : Qui je suis ? directed by Catherine Marnas, théâtre de la Criée
- 2000 : Becket ou l'Honneur de Dieu, de Jean Anouilh, directed by Didier Long, tournée

== Writing ==
- Laurent Lafitte, comme son nom l'indique

== Discography ==
- 2009 : Hervé Guibert: L'écrivain-Photographe textes lus, avec Jean-Louis Trintignant, Juliette Gréco, Dominique A livre audio
- 2010 : AudioInstants, Compilation. 2 titres : "Tes états d'âme ...Eric" et "Parker Par coeur"

== Awards ==
- 2001 : au César du cinéma, il a été nommé pour le meilleur espoir masculin : La confusion des genres
- 2003 : au Festival du film de télévision de Luchon, il a remporté le prix d'interprétation pour Quelques jours entre nous
- 2011 : au Los Angeles cinema festival of hollywood, pour The philosopher, il a remporté le prix de best supporting actor.

== See also ==
- French television
