= Joy Ride (2001 film) =

2001 film by John Dahl

- Theatrical release poster
- Directed by: John Dahl
- Written by: Clay Tarver; J. J. Abrams
- Produced by: J. J. Abrams; Chris Moore
- Starring: Steve Zahn; Paul Walker; Leelee Sobieski
- Cinematography: Jeffrey Jur
- Edited by: Eric L. Beason; Glen Scantlebury
- Music by: Marco Beltrami
- Production companies: Regency Enterprises; Bad Robot; LivePlanet
- Distributed by: 20th Century Fox
- Release dates: September 9, 2001 (TIFF); October 5, 2001 (United States)
- Running time: 97 minutes
- Country: United States
- Language: English
- Budget: $23 million
- Box office: $36.6 million

Joy Ride is a 2001 American road horror-thriller film directed by John Dahl and starring Steve Zahn, Paul Walker, and Leelee Sobieski. The screenplay by Clay Tarver and J. J. Abrams follows two brothers and their childhood acquaintance who are terrorized by a psychopathic killer after pranking him on their CB radio during a road trip.

Production on the film began in July 1999. Casting was extensive, with multiple actors considered prior to Walker and Zahn signing on. Principal photography took place in Nevada, California, and Utah. It was produced by Regency Enterprises, Bad Robot and LivePlanet.

Joy Ride, premiered at the 26th Toronto International Film Festival on September 9, 2001, and was released in the United States on October 5, by 20th Century Fox. Although it only performed moderately at the box office, grossing $36.6 million on a $23 million budget, it received generally positive reviews from critics and was nominated for Best Action, Adventure, or Thriller Film at the 28th Saturn Awards.

In the United Kingdom, the film was released under the title Road Kill, and as Roadkill in Australia. Joy Ride spawned two direct-to-video sequels, Joy Ride 2: Dead Ahead (2008) and Joy Ride 3: Roadkill (2014).

== Plot ==
While traveling from California to Colorado to pick up his childhood friend and crush Venna, Lewis Thomas reluctantly stops in Salt Lake City after he learns his estranged brother Fuller has been arrested. Lewis bails him out and Fuller tags along for the ride.

Fuller has a CB radio installed in Lewis's car and the two begin listening in on truckers' chatter. Fuller coaxes Lewis into playing a prank on a truck driver nicknamed Rusty Nail, asking him to pretend to be a woman named Candy Cane. They set up a meeting with Rusty Nail in a motel where Lewis and Fuller are spending the night; they tell Rusty Nail that Candy Cane will be in room 17, the room of a disrespectful businessman with whom Fuller had an encounter at the front desk. When Rusty Nail arrives, the brothers listen from the adjoining room; an argument and sounds of a scuffle are briefly heard.

The next morning, Lewis and Fuller learn that the police found the businessman on the highway, leaving him in a coma with his lower jaw ripped off. Lewis admits they were involved and Sheriff Ritter upbraids them for their role in the incident, but lets them go. Back on the road near Laramie, Wyoming, Rusty Nail is heard again on the radio looking for Candy Cane. Lewis reveals the prank to Rusty Nail and Rusty Nail demands an apology, but Fuller insults him instead. Rusty Nail then notes they should get their taillight fixed, indicating he is following them.

They drive to a nearby gas station and unsuccessfully attempt to contact Sheriff Ritter. Seeing an ice truck pull into the gas station, they flee from the scene into a dead end, with the truck driver chasing them. The driver turns out to be a kind stranger trying to return Lewis's credit card, which he left behind in panic. The real Rusty Nail then drives through the ice truck and, as he slowly crushes Lewis's car against a tree, Fuller hysterically apologizes. Rusty Nail drives away, declaring his actions to be simply a retaliatory joke.

Believing themselves safe, the brothers arrive in Colorado and pick up Venna. They stop at a motel and, as Lewis falls asleep, Rusty Nail calls his room, revealing he has noticed Venna has joined them. They flee from the motel, but see messages from Rusty Nail spray painted on road signs, instructing them to look in the trunk; they find the CB radio Fuller had previously thrown from the window of the car. Rusty Nail then contacts them again via the radio, announcing that he has kidnapped Venna's friend Charlotte, and he directs them to a cornfield where the three get split up. Rusty Nail kidnaps Venna.

Rusty Nail sets up a meeting at another motel in room 17, mirroring the false date with which he was pranked. Using a shotgun, he sets up a trap that will kill the bound-and-gagged Venna if the room door is opened. Fuller attempts to get in the room by a back window, but is injured by Rusty Nail and gets stuck outside. Lewis attempts to free Fuller as the police arrive to help Venna. Meanwhile, Rusty Nail's truck appears uphill and begins rolling down towards the motel. The brothers free Venna in time and everyone escapes as the truck crashes into the motel. As the police investigate Rusty Nail's truck, they see a dead body in the driver's seat and Charlotte, still alive, in the back.

While Lewis, Fuller, Charlotte, and Venna are treated for their injuries on scene, they learn that the dead man inside the truck was the ice truck driver who returned Lewis's credit card. From the CB in the ambulance, the group hears Rusty Nail's voice, learning that he is alive and free.

== Cast ==
- Paul Walker as Lewis Thomas
- Steve Zahn as Fuller Thomas
- Leelee Sobieski as Venna Wilcox
- Jessica Bowman as Charlotte Dawson
- Matthew Kimbrough as Rusty Nail (Note: Kimbrough receives a credit as "Clavo", Spanish for "nail".)
  - Ted Levine as voice of Rusty Nail (Note: Uncredited.)
- Stuart Stone as Danny, Lewis's roommate
- Brian Leckner as Officer Keeney
- Jim Beaver as Sheriff Ritter
- Hugh Dane as Man at door
- Jay Hernandez as Marine
- Basil Wallace as Car salesman
- Rachel Singer as Gas station manager
- Satch Huizenga as Mr. Jones
- Luis Cortés as Night manager
- Kenneth White as Ronald Ellinghouse
- Tony Cantwell as Cop
- Walton Goggins as Cop (Note: Scenes deleted.)

== Production ==
=== Development ===
In July 1999, it was announced that Leelee Sobieski was set to star in Squelch, the film's working title, with John Dahl directing from a screenplay by Clay Tarver and J. J. Abrams. The other parts had not yet been cast, although Tobey Maguire (Note: There might have been some confusion by the writer of the Variety news article, since Maguire had already starred in the unrelated 1997 film titled Joyride — joyride with one word, not two.) and Steve Zahn were understood to have been offered roles. In the next month, Paul Walker joined the cast alongside Sobieski and Zahn. The film's budget was initially reported to be $20 million.

Joy Ride was produced by Abrams and Chris Moore, while Arnon Milchan, Patrick Markey, and Bridget Johnson served as executive producers.

=== Filming ===
The film was shot in Nevada, California, and Utah.

=== Alternate footage ===
On the DVD release, there is a 29-minute-long alternate ending, and four other shorter alternate endings. The main one featured Rusty Nail's shotgun suicide and numerous bodies are found by the police in his trailer. One featured Rusty Nail being arrested, another being beaten in a fight with both Thomas brothers, another in which he is blown up in his truck, and another saw Rusty Nail run over with his own truck. The ending featured in the actual theatrical cut of the film is the only ending in which Rusty Nail lives. There are also numerous deleted scenes.

In the alternate ending where Rusty Nail's truck explodes, there is a water tower behind the truck as it burns. The original intention was to have the truck hit the water tower and have the water come down and put the flames out so that it would be believable if Rusty Nail survived. However, time constraints kept the scene from being filmed. The water tower cost over $100,000.

Sobieski filmed two romantic interludes, one with Zahn and one with Walker during the shooting and re-shooting of the film. Both scenes ended up getting cut. This may explain why Venna appears to be romantically interested in both of them.

== Release ==
The film premiered in the Special Presentations section of the 26th Toronto International Film Festival on September 9, 2001. It was released in the United States on October 5, 2001, and in the UK under the title Road Kill on April 26, 2002, and in Australia as Roadkill. The alternate titles were because of the negative connotations of “joy rides” as stealing cars rather than fun roadtrips.

=== Home media ===
20th Century Fox Home Entertainment released a special edition DVD on March 12, 2002. A Blu-ray edition was later issued by 20th Century Fox Home Entertainment on September 10, 2013.

=== Ownership and rights ===
In 2019, Rupert Murdoch sold most of 21st Century Fox's film and television assets to Disney. However, much of Joy Ride's underlying rights were with production company Regency Enterprises rather than Fox, and Twentieth Century Fox Film Corporation are not mentioned as one of the copyright holders in the credits. (Note: Copyright notice in the credits for Joy Ride, 2001.) At the time of the sale, Fox had a 20% stake in Regency Enterprises, and this 20% stake was transferred to Disney when they purchased the Fox entertainment assets. As such, and in an effort to appeal to mature audiences instead of just family audiences, it was one of the very first R-rated films released on Disney+, as well as the first ever in the horror genre released on that specific platform in the United States in April 2022, but the decision was eventually dropped by the time it became available in Canada instead.

== Reception ==
=== Box office ===
Joy Ride grossed $21,974,919 in the United States and Canada, and $14,667,919 in other territories, for a worldwide total of $36,642,838.

=== Critical response ===
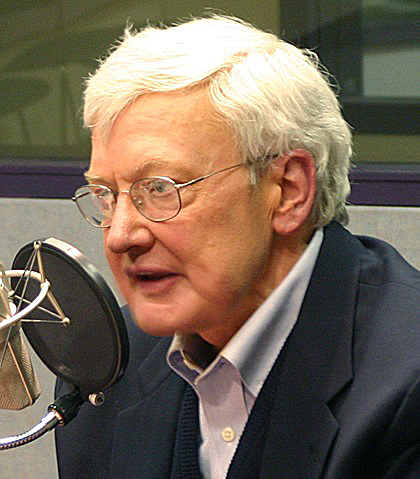
Roger Ebert praised the film, likening its "evil, marauding" antagonist to Michael Myers in Halloween (1978)

On the review aggregator website Rotten Tomatoes, 74% of 116 critics' reviews are positive, with an average rating of 6.6/10. The website's consensus reads: "A well-constructed B-movie thriller, Joy Ride keeps up the necessary level of tension and chills. Critics also liked Zahn's performance as the goofball older brother." Metacritic, which uses a weighted average, assigned the film a score of 75 out of 100, based on 31 critics, indicating "generally favorable" reviews. Audiences polled by CinemaScore gave the film an average grade of "B+" on an A+ to F scale.

Kevin Thomas of the Los Angeles Times called the film "terrific escapist fare, stylish, outrageous and compelling." Thomas stated, "Joy Ride is a high-wire act, full of risks and shameless in resorting to old ploys only to put a fresh spin on them. As an action comedy played at the darkest pitch, Joy Ride is a plus for all concerned, especially its actors."

A. O. Scott of The New York Times wrote that the film "is much more effectively terrifying than the usual overplotted, underwritten Hollywood thriller." Scott also commented, "It's also surprisingly funny, thanks to a playful script by Clay Tarver and J. J. Abrams and a mischievous performance by Mr. Zahn." Roger Ebert of the Chicago Sun-Times awarded Joy Ride three and a half stars out of a possible four, and described the film as "a first-rate pure thriller" which was "anchored by convincing characters in a halfway plausible setup." He had a few minor "quibbles" about aspects of individual scenes, but also said the climax was "relentlessly well-crafted," summarizing: "There is a kind of horror movie that plays so convincingly we don’t realize it’s an exercise in pure style. Halloween is an example, and John Dahl‘s Joy Ride is another. Both films have an evil, marauding predator who just keeps on coming, no matter what, and always seems to know what the victims will do next."

Stephen Hunter of The Washington Post opined, "In noir, everybody's guilty, and that's one of the pleasures of Joy Ride" and "The flaw in Joy Ride isn't the ride at all — that's the cool part — but the arrival. The movie, like so many other American products of late, turns dully obvious at the end. […] Joy Ride, as much fun as it conjures, just ends up going no place fast." Lisa Schwarzbaum of Entertainment Weekly stated, "Joy Ride zigzags across the conventions of genre, occasionally driving on the shoulders of black humor—it's a road movie for the way we process suspense today, and very recognizably the zany-brainy work of John Dahl, the urbane neo-noirist."

Desson Howe of The Washington Post remarked, "The story, although it's scripted with impressive gravitas by Clay Tarver and J. J. Abrams, seems more like a conduit for suspense. That's why I call this movie an "exercise," because Dahl is almost playfully trying to scare the bejesus out of you. Joy Ride is about running — or driving — for your life, plain and simple."

Joe Leydon of Variety called the film a "hot-wired, white-knuckle thriller" and wrote that it "maneuvers more smoothly, and avoids plot holes more consistently, as it steadily gains momentum while speeding through familiar territory."

Paul Lê of Bloody Disgusting opined, "The film yields every now and then so viewers can catch their breath, but once this taut and frantic thriller picks up speed again, Joy Ride earns its place as one of the best movies of its kind."

=== Accolades ===
Award	Year	Category	Recipient	Result	Ref.
Fangoria Chainsaw Awards	2002	Best Wide-Release Film	Joy Ride	Nominated	
Fangoria Chainsaw Awards	2002	Best Score	Marco Beltrami	Nominated	
Golden Schmoes Awards	2001	Best Horror Movie of the Year	Joy Ride	Nominated	
Golden Schmoes Awards	2001	Most Underrated Movie of the Year	Joy Ride	Nominated	
Saturn Awards	2002	Best Action, Adventure, or Thriller Film	Joy Ride	Nominated	
