= Les Liaisons dangereuses (miniseries) =

- DVD release cover
- Based on: Les Liaisons dangereuses by Pierre Choderlos de Laclos
- Teleplay by: Eric-Emmanuel Schmitt
- Directed by: Josée Dayan
- Starring: Catherine Deneuve; Rupert Everett; Nastassja Kinski; Leelee Sobieski; Danielle Darrieux; Andrzej Zulawski
- Theme music composer: Angelo Badalamenti
- Countries of origin: France; Canada; United Kingdom
- Original language: French

Production
- Producer: Richard Lalonde
- Cinematography: Caroline Champetier
- Editor: Fred Béraud-Dufour
- Running time: 252 minutes

Original release
- Network: TF1
- Release: 23 August – 25 August 2003

Related
- Cruel Intentions (US pilot); Tempted (South Korea)

Les Liaisons dangereuses (English title: Dangerous Liaisons) is a 2003 French television mini-series directed by Josée Dayan starring Catherine Deneuve, Rupert Everett, Nastassja Kinski and Leelee Sobieski. It is based on the classic 1782 novel Les Liaisons dangereuses by Pierre Choderlos de Laclos.

== Plot ==
An updated adaptation of Choderlos de Laclos' classic 18th Century tale of seduction, betrayal and revenge set in the modern 1960s world of Parisian high society. The beautiful Madame de Merteuil (Catherine Deneuve) seeks vengeance against her ex-lover Gercourt (Andrzej Zulawski) when he becomes engaged to her young goddaughter, Cécile (Leelee Sobieski). Merteuil turns to her ex-lover/partner-in-crime, Valmont (Rupert Everett), famous for his reputation as a Don Juan, to seduce Cécile and emotionally destroy her. While on his mission, Valmont gets sidetracked when he goes to visit his aunt and falls for Madame Tourvel (Nastassja Kinski), a virtuous, married woman who knows of his womanizing ways, but that only makes the challenge more exciting to Valmont. Together, Madame de Merteuil and Valmont make a dangerous team and they will stop at nothing when it comes to matters of the heart.

== Cast ==
- Catherine Deneuve as Marquise Isabelle de Merteuil
- Rupert Everett as Vicomte Sébastien de Valmont
- Nastassja Kinski as Madame Marie de Tourvel
- Danielle Darrieux as Madame de Rosemonde
- Leelee Sobieski as Cécile de Volanges
- Andrzej Zulawski as Antoine Gercourt
- Cyrille Thouvenin as Hugo / Ludovic
- Françoise Brion as Madame Volanges
- Tedi Papavrami as Raphaël Danceny
- Dominique Besnehard as The deputy of the foundation
- Didier Flamand as The Director
- Maria Belooussova as La pianiste de la foundation
- Paolo Capisano as Me Plissu
