= Tosia Altman =

Member of the Polish and Jewish resistance movements in World War II

Tosia Altman טוסיה אלטמן
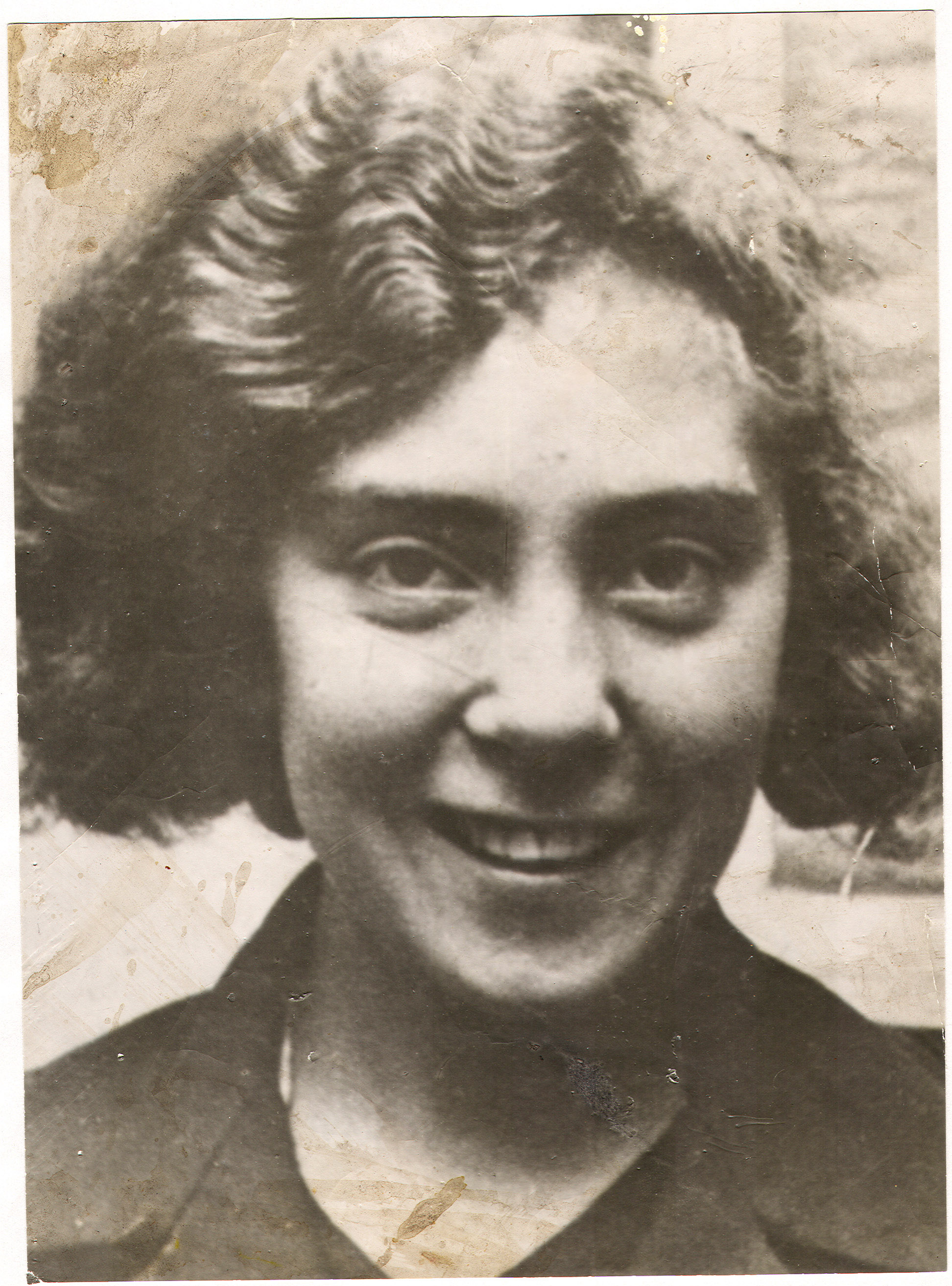
- Born: 24 August 1919; Lipno, Poland
- Died: 26 May 1943 (aged 23) Warsaw, General Government
- Allegiance: Hashomer Hatzair
- Branch: Jewish Combat Organization
- Service years: 1939–1943
- Rank: Courier and smuggler
- Conflicts: World War II: Warsaw Ghetto Uprising
- Awards: Silver Cross of the Virtuti Militari (posthumously)
- Other work: Zionist youth movement activist

Tosia Altman (Note: Some non-contemporaneous sources give Altman the nickname Tova or Taube.) (Hebrew: טוסיה אלטמן; 24 August 1919 – 26 May 1943) was a courier and smuggler for Hashomer Hatzair and the Jewish Combat Organization (ŻOB) during the German occupation of Poland and the Warsaw Ghetto Uprising.

Born into a well-off family of Zionist leanings, she joined Hashomer Hatzair and became part of the central leadership before the war. After the invasion of Poland, she fled with the leadership of the youth movements to Vilnius. Volunteering as a courier, she passed herself off as a Polish gentile and risked her life to visit ghettos, first to organize underground education and later to warn them of the impending mass extermination of Jews.

After the formation of the ŻOB in the Warsaw Ghetto, Altman was appointed a liaison to the Home Army. She smuggled weapons and explosives into the ghetto and established a chapter of the ŻOB in the Kraków Ghetto. During the Warsaw Ghetto Uprising, she acted as a courier between bunkers. Seeking shelter at the command bunker at 18 Miła Street, she was one of six to escape when the Germans discovered it. Despite suffering wounds to the leg and head, Altman escaped from the ghetto via the sewers. She was captured two weeks later when the factory she was sheltering in caught fire. Severely burned, she was handed over to the Gestapo and died two days later.

== Early life ==
Altman was born on 24 August 1919 to Anka and Gustaw Altman in Lipno, Poland, near the city of Włocławek. Her father, a watchmaker, owned a jewelry shop in Włocławek and the family was relatively well-off. Although her father had been raised in a Hasidic household, Altman's parents had a liberal interpretation of the Jewish faith and encouraged Altman to study Polish and Hebrew. Influenced by her father's General Zionist convictions, Altman studied at a Hebrew-language gymnasium and joined the Hashomer Hatzair youth movement at the age of eleven. Elected as a representative of the local branch of Hashomer Hatzair, she attended the Fourth World Convention in 1935. Inspired to immigrate to Israel, she joined a training kibbutz in Częstochowa in 1938, but Hashomer Hatzair soon appointed her to the central leadership of youth education in Warsaw.

== World War II ==
=== Courier ===
Upon the invasion of Poland by Nazi Germany in September 1939, the Zionist youth movements urged their members to flee eastward to avoid the Germans. With Adam Rand, a friend from Hashomer Hatzair, Altman walked to Rovno. When the Soviet Union invaded, Altman and the youth movement leadership evacuated to Vilna, under Polish and then Lithuanian control until June 1940. Altman joined the headquarters of Hashomer Hatzair in Vilna, and helped to organize several unsuccessful attempts to send members of the youth movements illegally to Palestine.

The youth movements were concerned about their friends and relatives trapped under Nazi occupation. Because most of the leaders had fled, the remaining members of youth movements could not organize effectively. It was therefore decided to send some of the leadership back into the General Government region of occupied Poland. Altman was considered to be an inspiring leader and good at organizing. Her blonde hair and fluent Polish (Note: Many Polish Jews spoke Yiddish as their primary language, and their accent in Polish gave them away as Jews.) meant that she could easily pass as a gentile. Most youth movement couriers were women, because Jewish men could be distinguished by their circumcision.

After two failed attempts to cross the Soviet and German borders, in December 1939 she visited her family in Włocławek and returned to Warsaw, the first youth movement leader to do so. Altman traveled frequently to Galicia and Częstochowa despite restrictions on Jews traveling by train, where she attempted to organize clandestine education and even training kibbutzim. She sent postcards to youth movement leaders in Vienna, Vilna, and Switzerland, describing the suffering of the Jews under the Nazi regime. After the walling-off of the Warsaw Ghetto, her own family trapped inside, Altman continued to travel under false papers despite the fact that to be caught outside the ghetto was a capital offense. She sent food packages into the Warsaw Ghetto for her family and friends.

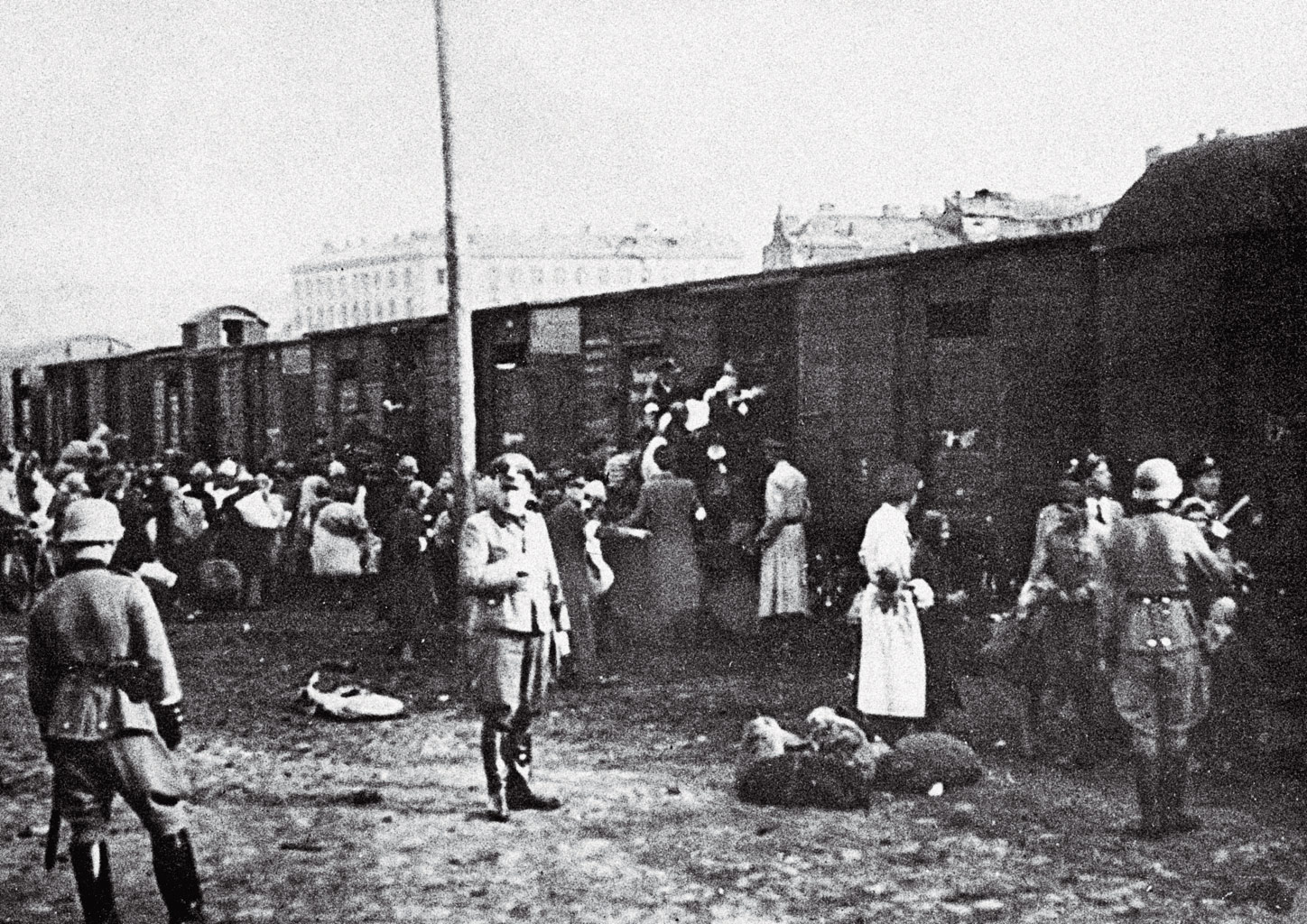
Jews from the Warsaw Ghetto are forced to board a train

On 24 December 1941, Altman and Haika Grossman managed to return to the Vilna Ghetto, where they met with Abba Kovner and the leadership of the United Partisan Organization. Altman described the horrible conditions in the Warsaw Ghetto, but still urged the Zionist leaders to evacuate there since the Vilna Ghetto was being systematically depopulated in a series of massacres at Ponary. Kovner disagreed, as he believed that there was a systematic plan to exterminate all Jews under Nazi control. The youth movements decided to promulgate the word about mass killings and encourage the ghettoized Polish Jews to resist with force. (Note: A few days later, Kovner released a manifesto to this effect: Let us not go like lambs to the slaughter!) On her trip back to Warsaw, Altman visited several eastern Polish ghettos, including Grodno, to pass along this message.

=== Smuggling arms ===
Upon her return to Warsaw, Altman found that the Jews were unwilling to accept that they were about to be exterminated, even after reports arrived of a death camp at Chełmno. In early 1942, she collaborated with other leftist groups to establish a self-defense organization, but their efforts came to nothing because they were unable to secure any arms. In July, during the Grossaktion Warsaw and after the establishment of the Jewish Combat Organization (ŻOB), Altman, due to her Aryan appearance and Polish language skills, was appointed a liaison with the Home Army and Armia Ludowa. Although these Polish resistance organizations refused to offer any substantial help, Altman helped smuggle some grenades and explosives. Living on the Aryan side of the city, she also helped Jews escape from the ghetto and find places to hide. In a letter to Adam Rand, then in Vienna, in April 1942, she wrote, "Jews are dying before my eyes and I am powerless to help. Did you ever try to shatter a wall with your head?"

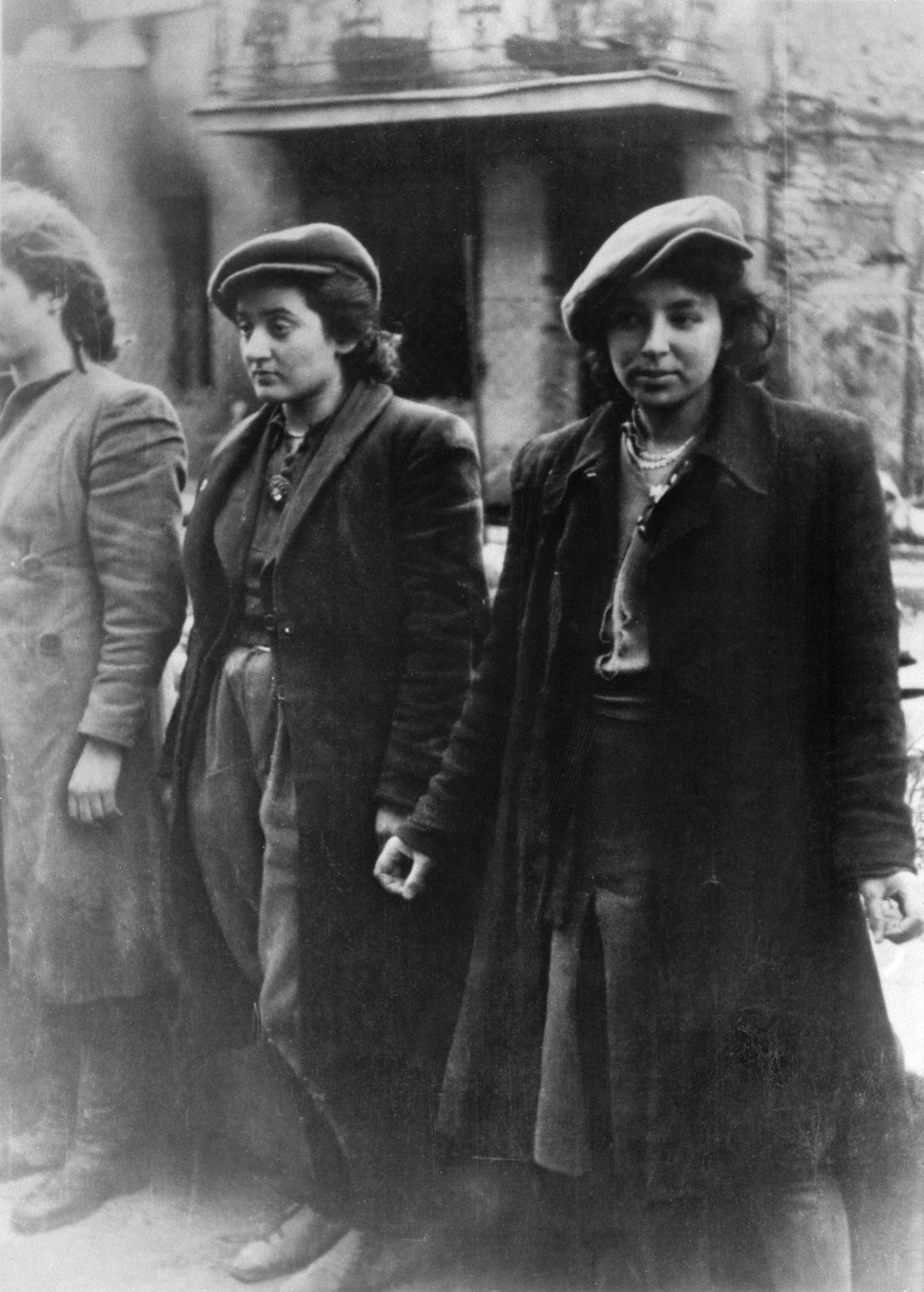
Captured Hehalutz fighters during the Warsaw Ghetto Uprising

In September, the Grossaktion finally ceased, leaving less than 70,000 Jews in the Warsaw Ghetto, one-fifth the original population. The leadership of Hashomer Hatzair was damaged by Gestapo arrests and an explosives cache of another smuggler was detected. Altman was joined by Arie Wilner, another Hashomer Hatzair activist, in an attempt to convince the Polish resistance groups to arm them. She also continued her visits to other ghettos, this time organizing armed resistance. She was instrumental in setting up a chapter of the ŻOB in the Kraków Ghetto. In October, the Home Army recognized the ŻOB and began to provide weapons, starting in December.

=== Warsaw Ghetto Uprising and death ===
In January 1943, during the next wave of deportations, the Warsaw Jews put up scattered armed resistance. The ŻOB infiltrated the Jews rounded up for deportation and launched a surprise attack on the Germans. Most were killed, but the leader, Mordechai Anielewicz, managed to escape. During the action, Altman returned to the ghetto with another female smuggler, Tema Schneiderman, to fight with the ŻOB. Both were apprehended and taken to the Umschlagplatz for deportation to Treblinka, but Altman was released by a Jewish ghetto policeman acting for Hashomer Hatzair. The resistance was partly successful: the Germans only deported 5,000 Jews, rather than the 8,000 that they had wanted to. After the January skirmish, the Home Army began to support the ŻOB in earnest, and the remaining Jews trained and built bunkers in preparation for the final liquidation. Altman and Wilner were also able to buy a few weapons on the black market. Wilner was arrested in March, but he did not betray the resistance even under torture. Afraid that the Germans had tracked her down, Altman returned to the ghetto, replaced by Yitzhak Zuckerman as liaison to the Polish resistance.

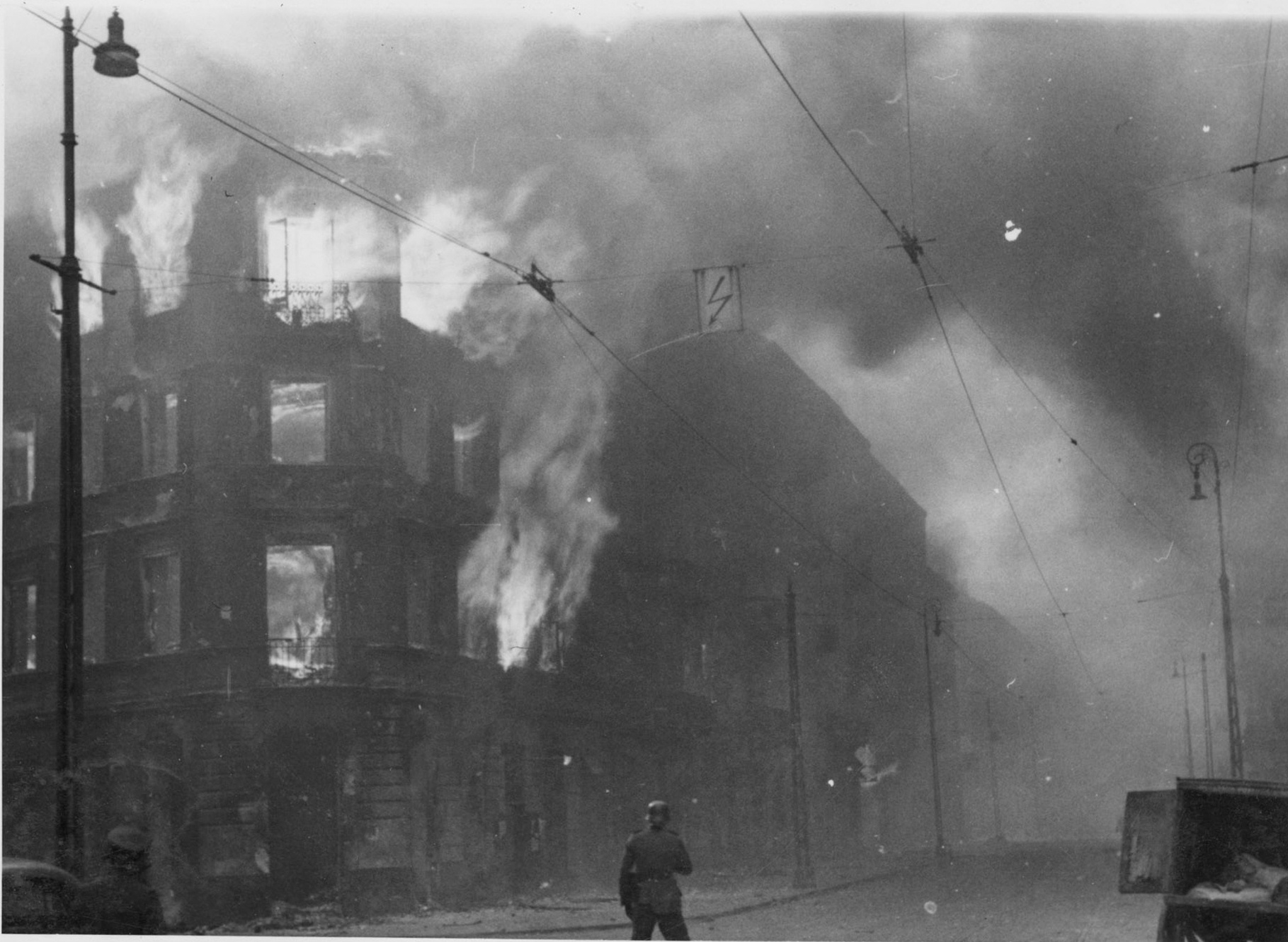
Warsaw Ghetto in flames during the uprising

On 18 April, German forces surrounded the ghetto in preparation for its liquidation. Altman, whose function was still to relay messages, reported the initial success of the resistance to Zuckerman via telephone. On 21 April, as the Germans began to burn the ghetto, Anielewicz took refuge in a bunker at 18 Mila Street; Altman became the courier between the command bunker and another bunker where the wounded were held. She also rescued some fighters from the fires. At this time, the fighters decided to try to escape via the sewer system. When the Germans discovered the Mila Street bunker on 8 May, they filled it with gas to force the inhabitants to leave. Anielewicz and many other resistance fighters committed suicide. Altman, although wounded, was one of six who managed to escape and was found by Zivia Lubetkin and Marek Edelman, who smuggled her out to the Aryan side.

Altman hid with other Jewish fighters in a celluloid factory. On 24 May, an accidental fire broke out. Severely burned, Altman was forced into the open where she was captured by police who turned her over to the Gestapo. She died of her injuries two days later.

== Legacy ==
Altman was posthumously awarded the Silver Cross of the Military Order of Virtuti Militari by the decision of the President of the Polish People's Republic on April 1, 1948, for her merits in the underground struggle during the occupation.

She was portrayed by American actress Leelee Sobieski in the 2001 television film Uprising.
