= Leelee Sobieski =

American actress and artist (born 1983)

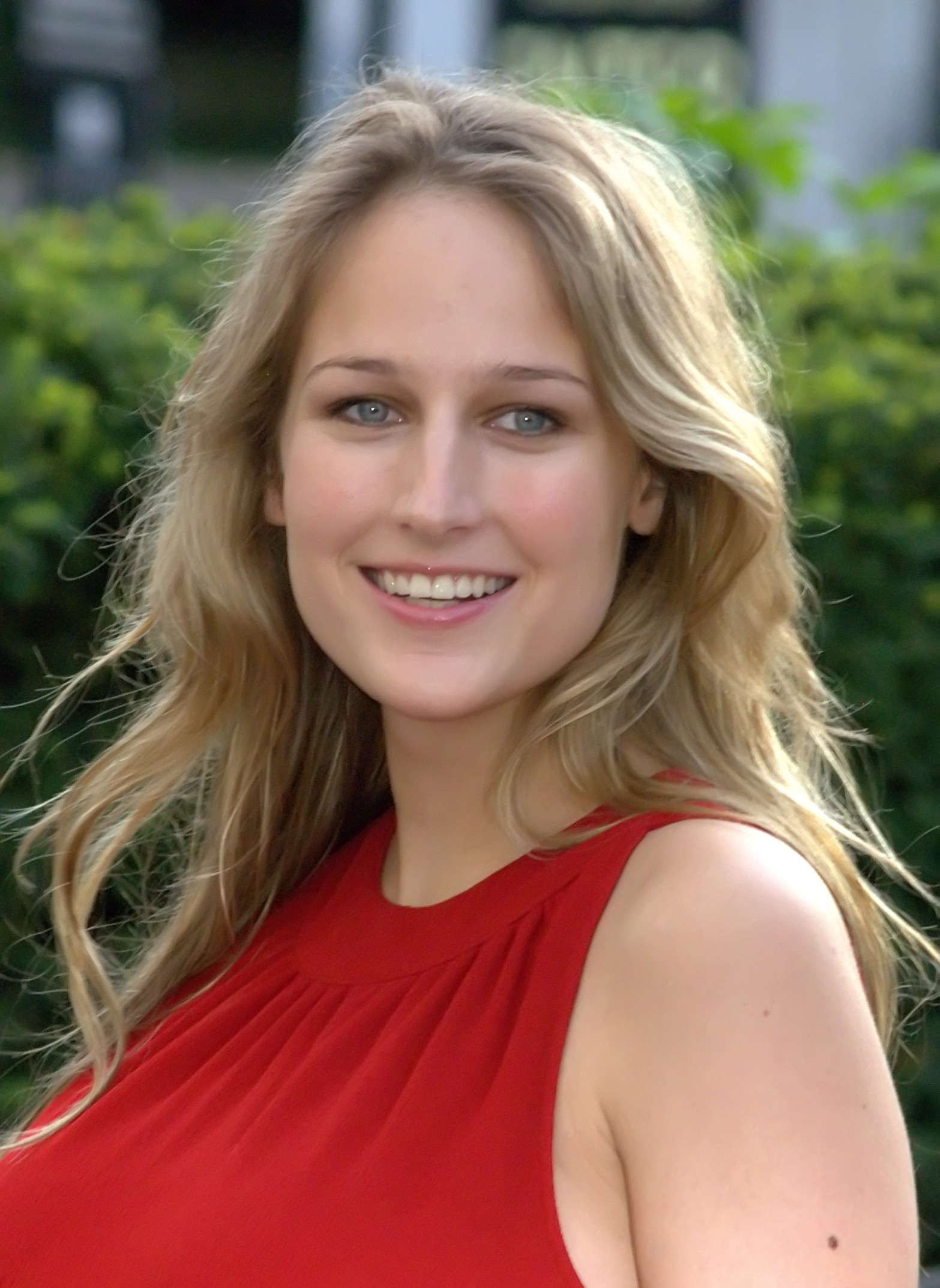
- Sobieski in 2009
- Born: Liliane Rudabet Gloria Elsveta Sobieski; June 10, 1983 (age 43); New York City, U.S.
- Other name: Leelee Kimmel
- Occupations: Actress; artist
- Years active: 1994–present (Note: Sobieski retired as an actress in 2012 but continues to work as an artist.)
- Spouse: Adam Kimmel (m. 2010)
- Children: 2
- Relatives: Martin Kimmel (father-in-law); Donald Aronow (grandfather-in-law)

Liliane Rudabet Gloria Elsveta "Leelee" Sobieski (born June 10, 1983) is an American artist and retired actress. She achieved fame in her teens with roles in films such as Deep Impact (1998), Never Been Kissed, Eyes Wide Shut (both 1999), Here on Earth (2000), Joy Ride and The Glass House (both 2001).

She received Emmy and Golden Globe Award nominations for her portrayal of the title character in the television miniseries Joan of Arc (1999), and a further Golden Globe nomination for her performance in the NBC miniseries Uprising (2001). Sobieski continued to work in films and on television until retiring from acting in 2012, after which she focused on her children and art career.

== Early life and education ==
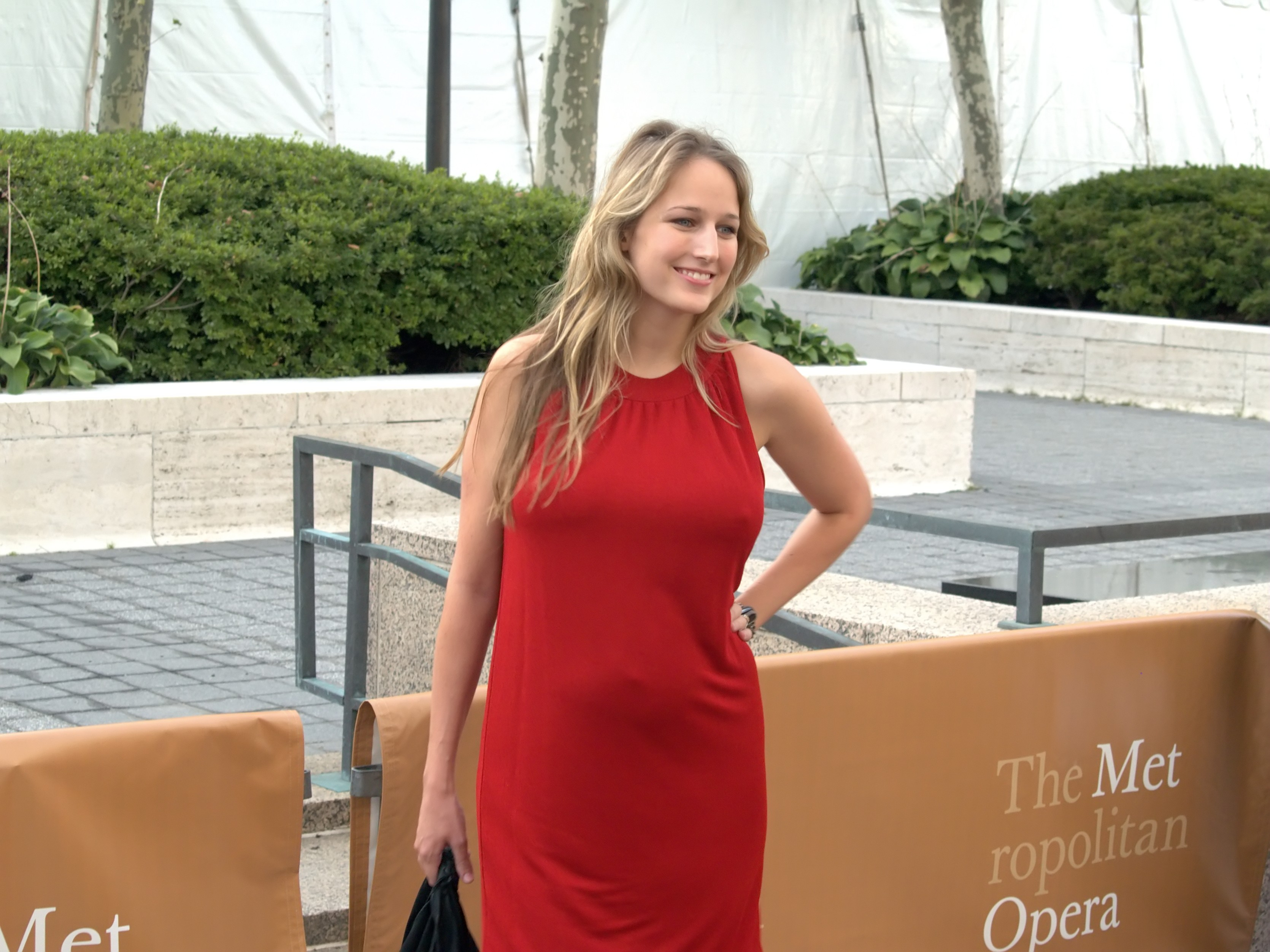
Sobieski pregnant at the opening night of the Metropolitan Opera in 2009

Sobieski was born in New York City, on June 10, 1983. Her mother, Elizabeth Sobieski (née Salomon), is an American film producer and screenwriter who also worked as Sobieski's manager, and her father, Jean Sobieski, is a French-born painter and former actor of Polish and Swiss descent. Her maternal grandfather, United States Navy Captain Robert Salomon, was Jewish. Her maternal grandmother was of Ashkenazi Jewish and Dutch descent. Sobieski grew up in a "pan-religious" family; she has said that she is "proud of [her] melting pot roots". Her younger brother is Robert "Roby" Sobieski.

Sobieski's first name, Liliane, was the name of her paternal grandmother. One of her middle names, Elsveta, is derived from her mother's name, Elizabeth.

She graduated from Trevor Day School in 2001 and studied literature and fine art at Brown University but did not graduate.

== Acting career ==
Sobieski was first noticed by a talent scout in the cafeteria of a New York City private school. That encounter led to her audition for the role of Claudia in Interview with the Vampire (1994), a role that ultimately went to Kirsten Dunst. Sobieski portrayed the character of Anna Yates in the 1994 TV movie Reunion starring Marlo Thomas. Next, she played a lead role in A Horse for Danny, a 1995 made-for-television film. In 1997, she snagged her first role in a studio film playing the daughter of Martin Short's character in the Tim Allen comedy Jungle 2 Jungle.

While still in her mid-teens, Sobieski rose to fame with her appearance in the movie Deep Impact (1998). The film was a major financial success, grossing over $349 million worldwide on a $75 million production budget. Deep Impact brought her to the attention of many casting directors. That same year Sobieski appeared in the Merchant Ivory film A Soldier's Daughter Never Cries. Sobieski's performance received praise from critics; Emanuel Levy of Variety wrote that "the graceful Sobieski registers strongly as a potential star, combining physical charm with technical skill." The film garnered her a Young Artist Award nomination, as well as a nomination by the Chicago Film Critics Association.

In 1999, Sobieski appeared in Stanley Kubrick's Eyes Wide Shut. Recalling acting alongside Tom Cruise, Sobieski stated he was "very kind and considerate with me", and says her most vivid recollection of Kubrick, who died soon after filming finished, was that he "genuinely seemed to hold something magic".

Also in 1999, Sobieski was cast in a supporting role in the teen comedy film Never Been Kissed starring Drew Barrymore. Her next performance in the title role of the television miniseries Joan of Arc (1999) earned her an Emmy nomination and a Golden Globe nomination, and she became the youngest actress ever to portray Joan of Arc on screen.

In 2000, Sobieski played the female lead in the film Here on Earth opposite Josh Hartnett and Chris Klein, for which she received a Teen Choice Award nomination. She received a second Golden Globe nomination for her portrayal of Tosia Altman in the 2001 TV film Uprising.

In 2001, Sobieski played the lead role in the road horror film Joy Ride with Paul Walker and Steve Zahn. The film received generally favorable reviews. Garth Franklin of Dark Horizons stated that Sobieski "does a better job than usual." That same year, she starred in the thriller The Glass House, alongside Diane Lane. The film was panned by critics and, with little promotion, had a disappointing opening weekend gross of just under $6 million. Leonard Maltin complained that Sobieski acted more sullen than vulnerable. Sobieski's performance in the 2001 low-budget drama My First Mister was praised by critics, with Pete Croatto of Filmcritic.com writing that, "As for Sobieski, who I've always liked, she does another fine job. This time it's with a shaky character – the troubled Goth chick... [but] Sobieski finds her character's human touch and runs with it."

Sobieski landed a starring role in the independent film L'Idole (2002), which opened at the Toronto International Film Festival. She then starred alongside John Cusack in the drama feature Max, as the mistress of a Jewish art dealer who mentors a young Adolf Hitler. Next, she portrayed the character of Cecile in the miniseries Les Liaisons dangereuses (2003) with Catherine Deneuve and Rupert Everett, an adaptation of Laclos's classic novel of sexual intrigue which made use of Sobieski's fluency in French. She portrayed the role of Deianira in Hercules, a 2005 television miniseries.

The experimental-indie film Lying, starring Sobieski alongside Chloë Sevigny and Jena Malone, debuted at the 2006 Cannes Film Festival, followed by a limited release in the United States in 2008. She next starred in the American drama Heavens Fall as one of several young women who accuse nine black youths of rape in the segregated South. That same year, she appeared in the horror film In a Dark Place as well as the remake of The Wicker Man starring Nicolas Cage.

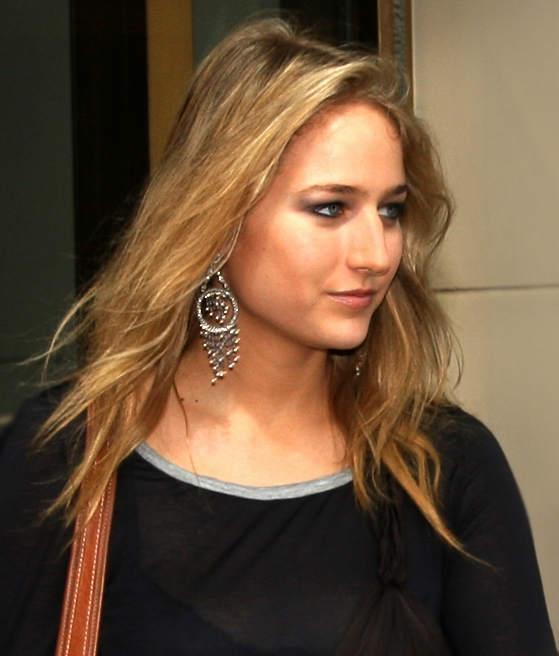
Sobieski at the 2007 Toronto International Film Festival

The independent comedy film Walk All over Me, in which Sobieski plays a woman who becomes a dominatrix, premiered at the 2007 Toronto International Film Festival and was later screened at several other film festivals. Her next major motion picture, the thriller 88 Minutes co-starring Al Pacino and Alicia Witt, opened on April 18, 2008, in the United States, after a release in various other countries the previous year. Though panned by critics, the film was a minor success at the box office, earning more than $32 million worldwide.

In January 2008, Sobieski appeared in In the Name of the King: A Dungeon Siege Tale, a fantasy film inspired by the Dungeon Siege video game series. For her performances in both 88 Minutes and A Dungeon Siege Tale, she received a Razzie Award nomination for Worst Supporting Actress. Sobieski next reteamed with her Joy Ride co-star Steve Zahn in the direct-to-video film Night Train. In the film, Sobieski plays Chloe, a potentially lethal medical student who has a fateful encounter with two other strangers aboard a Polar Express-like train.

In 2009, Sobieski had a small role in the biographical crime drama Public Enemies. In June 2010, she starred alongside Denise Richards and Jamie Kennedy in the film Finding Bliss, a romantic comedy about a straitlaced aspiring filmmaker who is forced to go to work for a producer of adult films. She made a guest appearance in the television series Drop Dead Diva in the episode "A Mother's Secret". Sobieski also played a lead role in the 2010 drama thriller Acts of Violence, the story of a man on a mission of vengeance after his wife is raped. Also in 2010, Sobieski filmed a supporting role in the indie comedy-drama The Last Film Festival, which was not released until 2016.

Sobieski guest-starred on a January 2011 episode of The Good Wife, playing the girlfriend of one of Lockhart/Gardner & Bond's most influential clients, who is accused of using prescription stimulants.

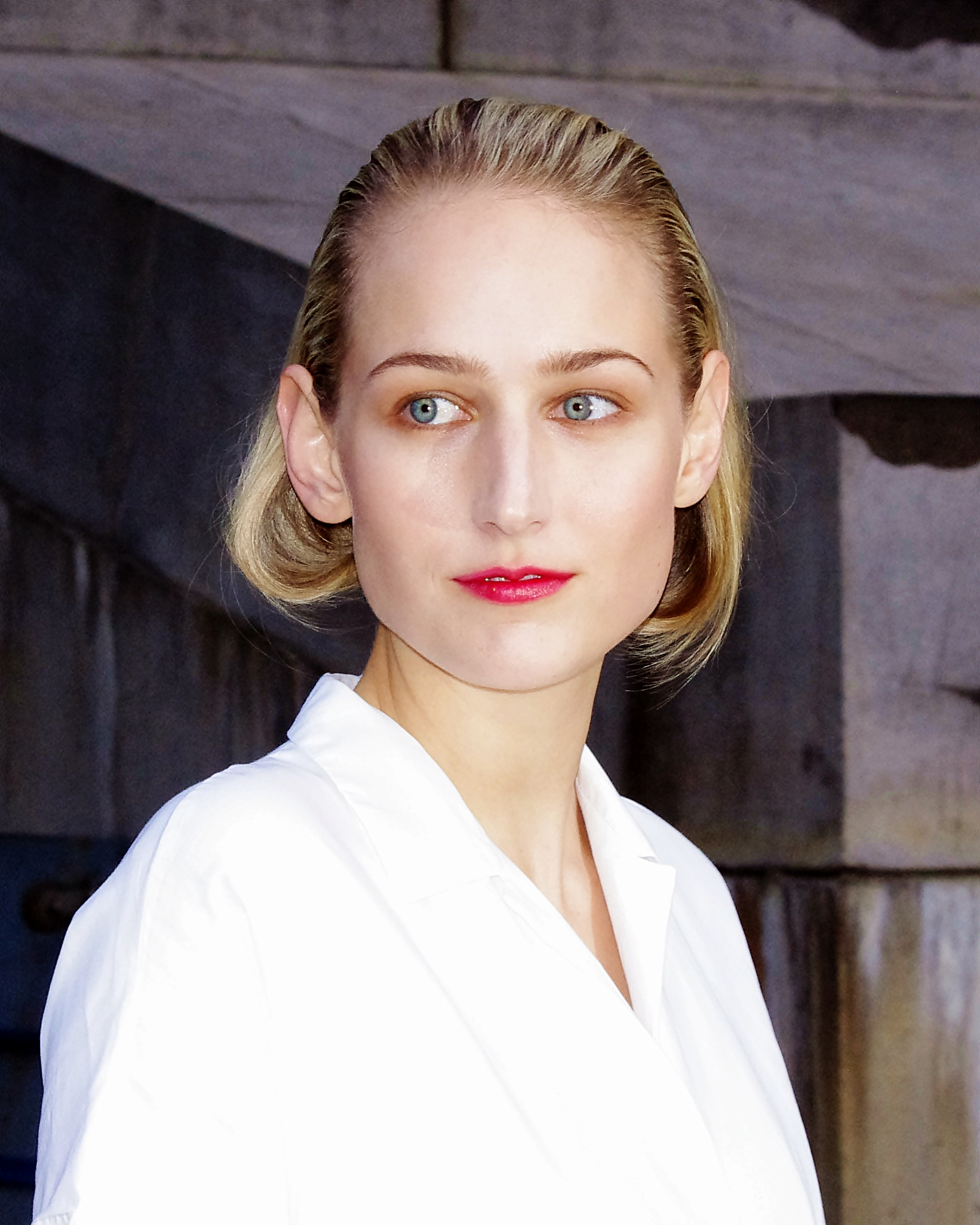
Sobieski at the Vanity Fair party for the 2012 Tribeca Film Festival

From April 2012 to August 2012, Sobieski starred in the lead role of Officer Jennifer "White House" Perry, a rookie New York City police officer, on the CBS drama series NYC 22, which was created by Richard Price and produced by Robert De Niro. She also played the lead role of Abby Gibbons in the movie Branded, which was released on September 7, 2012.

Sobieski retired from acting in 2012.

== Art career ==
She began her art career using her married surname Leelee Kimmel. She paints and sculpts abstract work, and works in VR, using Google Tilt Brush. She uses bright colors, abstracted and textured shapes floating on either a large black or white background.

Her 2018 solo exhibit debut, "Channels", opened at the Journal Gallery in Williamsburg, Brooklyn, and garnered positive reviews. Vogue said the exhibit and her work "warrants serious merit". She then debuted her first UK exhibit titled "Wormhole" at the Simon Lee Gallery in London. In this latest installment, she presents large-scale abstract paintings that are confrontational in both colour and dimension, exploring themes of creation and destruction. "Kimmel's world is very much her own – a heady mix of daftness and profundity – and a space that's potentially fascinating, yet disorientating for those unfamiliar with it. Such are the worlds she builds in her paintings, too, and which expand beyond the canvas into gloriously gelatinous sculptures and a pioneering VR piece." Interview Magazine says, "Leelee Kimmel has always been an artist."

== Personal life ==
=== Family and relationships ===
In January 2009, Sobieski began dating fashion designer Adam John Kimmel, the son of American real estate developer Martin Kimmel and grandson of American boat racer and designer Donald Aronow. They were engaged on May 28, 2009, and the couple officially announced their engagement on July 17, 2009. Their daughter was born in December 2009, and the couple married in 2010. Four years later, in August 2014, their son was born. They live in Red Hook, Brooklyn.

Sobieski speaks fluent French, which she learned from her French-born father.

=== Interviews ===
Sobieski, in a 2001 interview with IGN, expressed her thoughts about whether the movies she was making were escapist fare, or that they had a deeper message for society,

Joy Ride isn't a film you would make a statement with. It's a fun, jump out of life film. That's great. I love those films. Those films are great in times like these too. You can make a point with a film and help society or not. Take a film like Bulworth, a fantastic film. There are certain films like that, that can appeal to everybody and have a message in it and that's really great.

In 2016, Sobieski confirmed "I don't do movie stuff anymore." Commenting on the reasons for her early retirement to Us Weekly, Sobieski said, "I am just focused on my kids. I think that's mainly why I stopped." In an interview with Vogue magazine in September 2012, she had explained, "Ninety percent of acting roles involve so much sexual stuff with other people, and I don't want to do that. It's such a strange fire to play with, and our relationship is surely strong enough to handle it, but if you're going to walk through fire, there has to be something incredible on the other side."

== Filmography ==
=== Film ===
Year	Title	Role	Notes
1994	Reunion	Anna Yates	TV Movie
1995	A Horse for Danny	Danny Bara	
1997	Jungle 2 Jungle	Karen Kempster	
1998	Deep Impact	Sarah Hotchner	
1998	A Soldier's Daughter Never Cries	Charlotte Anne "Channe" Willis	Nominated—Chicago Film Critics Association Award for Most Promising Newcomer; Nominated—Young Artist Award for Best Leading Young Actress – Feature Film
1999	Never Been Kissed	Aldys Martin	
1999	Eyes Wide Shut	Milich's Daughter	
2000	Here on Earth	Samantha "Sam" Cavanaugh	Nominated—Teen Choice Award for Choice Breakout Movie Star
2001	My First Mister	Jennifer J "Wilson"	
2001	Joy Ride	Venna Wilcox	
2001	The Glass House	Ruby Baker	
2001	Uprising	Tosia Altman	TV Movie; Nominated—Golden Globe Award for Best Actress - Miniseries or Television film
2002	The Idol	Sarah Silver	
2002	Max	Liselore Von Peltz	
2006	Lying	Sarah	
2006	Heavens Fall	Victoria Price	
2006	In a Dark Place	Anna Veigh	
2006	The Wicker Man	Sister Honey	
2006	Coven	Narrator (voice)	Short film
2006	The Elder Son	Lolita Sarafanov	
2007	Walk All over Me	Alberta	
2007	In the Name of the King: A Dungeon Siege Tale	Muriella	Nominated—Golden Raspberry Award for Worst Supporting Actress
2007	88 Minutes	Lauren Douglas / Lydia Doherty	Nominated—Golden Raspberry Award for Worst Supporting Actress
2009	Finding Bliss	Jody Balaban	
2009	Night Train	Chloe	
2009	Public Enemies	Polly Hamilton	
2009	Two Other Dreams	Maisie	Short film
2009	American Girl (Amerikalı Kız)	Faith Jenny Gordon	TV movie filmed in Turkey
2010	Acts of Violence	Olivia Flyn	
2012	Branded	Abby Gibbons	
2016	The Last Film Festival	The Stalker	filmed in 2010

=== Television ===
Year	Title	Role	Notes
1995	Charlie Grace	Jenny Grace	Main role
1996	Grace Under Fire	Lucy	Episode: "Positively Hateful"
1996	NewsRadio	High School Girl	Episode: "Arcade"
1998	F/X: The Series	Tanya	Episode: "Evil Eye"
1999	Joan of Arc	Joan of Arc	Miniseries; Nominated—Primetime Emmy Award for Outstanding Lead Actress in a Miniseries or Movie; Nominated—Golden Globe Award for Best Actress – Miniseries or Television Film; Nominated—Satellite Award for Best Actress – Miniseries or Television Film
2003	Les Liaisons dangereuses	Cécile de Volanges	Miniseries
2005	Hercules	Deianeira	Miniseries
2010	Drop Dead Diva	Samantha "Sam" Colby	Episode: "A Mother's Secret"
2011	The Good Wife	Alexis Symanski	Episode: "Breaking Up"
2012	NYC 22	Jennifer "White House" Perry	Main role

Music videos
Year	Title	Artist	Role
2002	"We Are All Made of Stars"	Moby	Leelee Sobieski
