= Branded (2012 film) =

- Theatrical release poster
- Directed by: Jamie Bradshaw; Aleksandr Dulerayn
- Written by: Jamie Bradshaw; Aleksandr Dulerayn
- Produced by: Jamie Bradshaw; Aleksandr Dulerayn
- Starring: Ed Stoppard; Jeffrey Tambor; Max von Sydow; Leelee Sobieski
- Cinematography: Roger Stoffers
- Edited by: Michael Blackburn
- Music by: Eduard Artemyev; Brain & Melissa
- Production company: TNT
- Distributed by: Roadside Attractions (United States); Karo Premiere (Russia)
- Release date: September 7, 2012
- Running time: 106 minutes
- Countries: Russia; United States
- Languages: English; Russian
- Box office: $3.7 million

Branded (also known as The Mad Cow and Moscow 2017 (Москва 2017 in Russian)) is a 2012 Russian–American dark fantasy science fiction film written, produced and directed by Jamie Bradshaw and Aleksandr Dulerayn. It was released on September 7, 2012.

== Plot ==
In early 1980s Soviet Union, young Misha Galkin looks up at the night sky and sees the stars shift into a cow-shaped constellation which turns to look at him. Moments later, he is struck by lightning. A woman who examines him afterwards comments that he will have an interesting life. Over the following years, Misha uses his natural skills to become an important marketing executive, receiving his big break when he meets Bob Gibbons, an American hired to spread Western brands in post-Communist Russia. When Bob's niece, Abby, visits from America, she and Misha begin a relationship, against Bob's wishes. They discuss the history of modern marketing, which Misha claims was invented by Vladimir Lenin, and Communism as the first true global brand.

Meanwhile, on a private Polynesian island, marketing guru Joseph Pascal meets with fast food company executives to discuss a plan to make the industry profitable again. They plan to change public perceptions of beauty and "make fat the new fabulous."

Misha is hired to promote a new reality TV show, "Extreme Cosmetica", in which an overweight woman will undergo plastic surgery to become thin. After the first operation, a woman falls into a coma and the public turns against the show, as well as the glorification of thin body types. Misha becomes the scapegoat for the failed project and is swarmed by protesters before being beaten by police and arrested. Upon his release from jail, he confronts Bob; Misha has realized that the show and the woman's coma were orchestrated by fast food companies, such as "The Burger". Bob denies the accusations, claiming that such a plan would require too many resources. Misha and Bob fight and Bob has a heart attack. Feeling guilty for his role in the fate of the "Extreme Cosmetic" contestant, Misha leaves Moscow and withdraws from modern society; he believes his marketing powers are a curse.

Over the next six years, the "fat is fabulous" campaign is successful; most people are overweight and advertising images now focus on this change in perception of the ideal body type. Misha dreams that he performs the Red Heifer ritual, sacrificing a red cow and bathing in its ashes. When he wakes, he discovers that he can see strange creatures that appear to be the embodiment of marketing brand desires. They cling to people's necks and no one except for Misha can see them.

Abby tracks Misha to a rural community where he lives as a simple cowherd. She takes Misha to her Moscow apartment where she reveals that Bob left her a substantial inheritance and that she and Misha have a six-year-old son, who is overweight and loves many junk food brands. Misha, distressed by his visions and disgusted with the rampant commercialism around him, impulsively destroys Abby's apartment. Abby is frightened by this behavior and leaves, taking their son with her.

Misha plans to fight the branding creatures by using their own methods. He returns to his old company and uses fear based marketing to make customers turn on the world's major brands, beginning with an anti-beef scare that turns people away from "The Burger" and towards a vegetarian Chinese restaurant chain, "Dim Song". Branding creatures fight and destroy each other throughout the city. Public opinion turns against marketing in general and the Russian parliament considers banning all advertising.

Alone in his office, Misha leaves a phone message for Abby, asking for her forgiveness. Abby arrives at his office but the building is suddenly raided by anti-advertising protesters who assault the employees in the building. Misha is struck in the head as he attempts to escape with Abby. An emergency broadcast on television states that Russia and other nations have agreed to ban advertising as Misha lies on the floor, bleeding.

Some time later, Misha wakes in the hospital and plays with Abby and their son. In the same hospital, the "Extreme Cosmetica" woman awakens from her coma and wanders into the streets to see an advertisement-free Moscow and a skyline free of billboards.

== Cast ==
- Ed Stoppard as Misha Galkin
- Leelee Sobieski as Abby Gibbons
- Max von Sydow as Joseph Pascal
- Jeffrey Tambor as Bob Gibbons
- Ingeborga Dapkunaite as Dubcek
- Rachel Davies as The Cow

== Release ==
The film was released in America on September 7, 2012 in 310 theaters.

=== Critical response ===
The film received predominantly negative reviews. Charlie Jane Anders of io9.com declared that "everything you've heard about Branded was false advertising," complaining that the trailers made the film appear to be "a weird, surrealistic version of They Live" but "unfortunately, instead of a fun monster movie, Branded is a truly dreary lecture on late-stage capitalism, in which logic basically goes out the window." Robert Abele of the Los Angeles Times described the film as "convoluted and pretentious... so packed with ideological pretension and forced whimsy it has no time for characterization or cohesion, despite its scrappy use of post-Communist Russia as ground zero for capitalism's next nightmare scenario." Lucius Shepard, admitting he did not understand the story fully, wrote that he wanted to sue the filmmakers "for defamation of the senses," adding, "Not since MST3K went off the air have I watched a movie so lacking in basic competence and craft." He acknowledged, "Branded is also a satire, though it undergoes drastic and abrupt shifts in tone that suggest a more dramatic production." In one of the few positive reviews, Andy Webster of The New York Times called the film "ambitious", observing that "Madison Avenue is going to hate Branded."

== See also ==
- Generation P – A 2011 Russian satirical film set in Moscow exploring corporate advertising and surreal marketing manipulation
