= Confusion of Genders =

- Theatrical release poster
- Directed by: Ilan Duran Cohen
- Written by: Ilan Duran Cohen; Philippe Lasry
- Produced by: Didier Boujard
- Starring: Pascal Greggory; Nathalie Richard; Julie Gayet; Alain Bashung; Cyrille Thouvenin
- Cinematography: Jeanne Lapoirie
- Edited by: Fabrice Rouaud
- Music by: Jay-Jay Johanson
- Distributed by: Haut et Cour
- Release date: 27 December 2000
- Running time: 94 minutes
- Country: France
- Language: French

Confusion of Genders (French: La Confusion des genres) is a 2000 French drama film starring Pascal Greggory. It was directed by Ilan Duran Cohen.

Two actors of this film were nominated at the César Awards 2001: Pascal Greggory for Best Actor – Leading Role and Cyrille Thouvenin for Most Promising Actor.

== Cast ==
- Pascal Greggory as Alain Bauman
- Nathalie Richard as Laurence Albertini
- Julie Gayet as Babette
- Alain Bashung as Etienne
- Vincent Martinez as Marc
- Cyrille Thouvenin as Christophe
- Marie Saint-Dizier as Marlène
