= Just a Question of Love =

2000 television film directed by Christian Faure

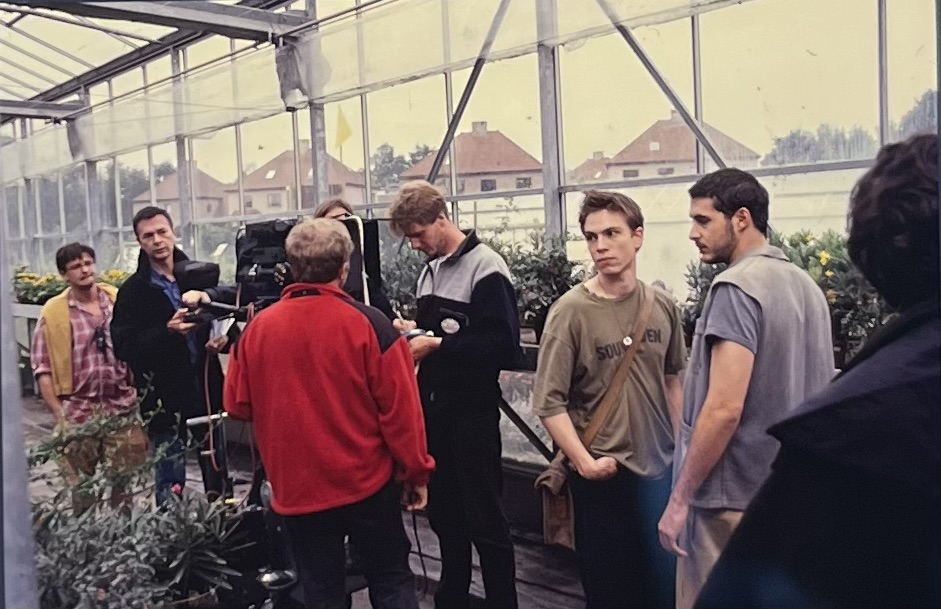
- On the set
- Written by: Pierre Pauquet; Christian Faure; Annick Larboulette
- Directed by: Christian Faure
- Starring: Cyrille Thouvenin; Stéphan Guérin-Tillié; Éva Darlan
- Theme music composer: Charles Court
- Country of origin: France
- Original language: French

Production
- Producers: Jean-Luc Azoulay; Takis Candilis; Pierre Grimblat; Martine Chicot; Dominique Janne; Marie-Astrid Lamboray; Stéphane Lhoest
- Cinematography: Louis-Philippe Capelle
- Editor: Marie-Claude Lacambre
- Running time: 88 minutes
- Production companies: Hamster Productions; France 2

Original release
- Network: France 2
- Release: 26 January 2000

Just a Question of Love (French: Juste une question d'amour) is a 2000 French-Belgian drama television film directed by Christian Faure that premiered on France 2.

== Plot ==
It follows the romance of two young gay men, Laurent (Cyrille Thouvenin) and Cédric (Stéphan Guérin-Tillié), who are having a conflict over whether Laurent should come out to his parents.

== Cast ==
- Cyrille Thouvenin as Laurent Mouries
- Stéphan Guérin-Tillié as Cédric Martin
- Éva Darlan as Emma Martin
- Danièle Denie as Jeanne Mouries
- Idwig Stéphane as Pierre Mouries
- Caroline Veyt as Carole
- Laurence César as Martine
- Jean-Pierre Valère as Georges
- Raphaëlle Lubansu as Noëlle
- Jean-Baptiste Lefèvre as Didier
- Aurélie Godichal as Marine
- Jonathan Fox as Alain
- Marcel Dossogne as M. Bermand
- Bruno Georis as Médecin Emma
- Diego Vanhoutte as Mathieu

== Ratings ==
The film was watched by 6.3 million viewers (28.6% market share) when it first aired.

== See also ==
- List of French-language films
