= A Boy Named Sue (film) =

2001 film by Julie Wyman

- Cover of Women Make Movies release
- Directed by: Julie Wyman
- Edited by: Julie Wyman
- Distributed by: Women Make Movies
- Release date: September 28, 2001 (Canada)
- Running time: 58 minutes
- Country: United States
- Language: English

A Boy Named Sue is a 2001 documentary film directed by Julie Wyman. It shows the life and transition of Theo, a transgender man who undergoes various stages of transition (including a mastectomy and hormone therapy). The protagonist is filmed extensively throughout, gives a number of interviews, and eventually settles down as a gay male. The film's title is taken from the song A Boy Named Sue.

== Distribution and reception ==
The film played at several festivals including the 2000 San Francisco International Lesbian and Gay Film Festival and Reel Affirmations. It was nominated for a 2004 GLAAD Media Award.
