= Sandra Nkaké =

Cameroonian actress and singer (born 1973)

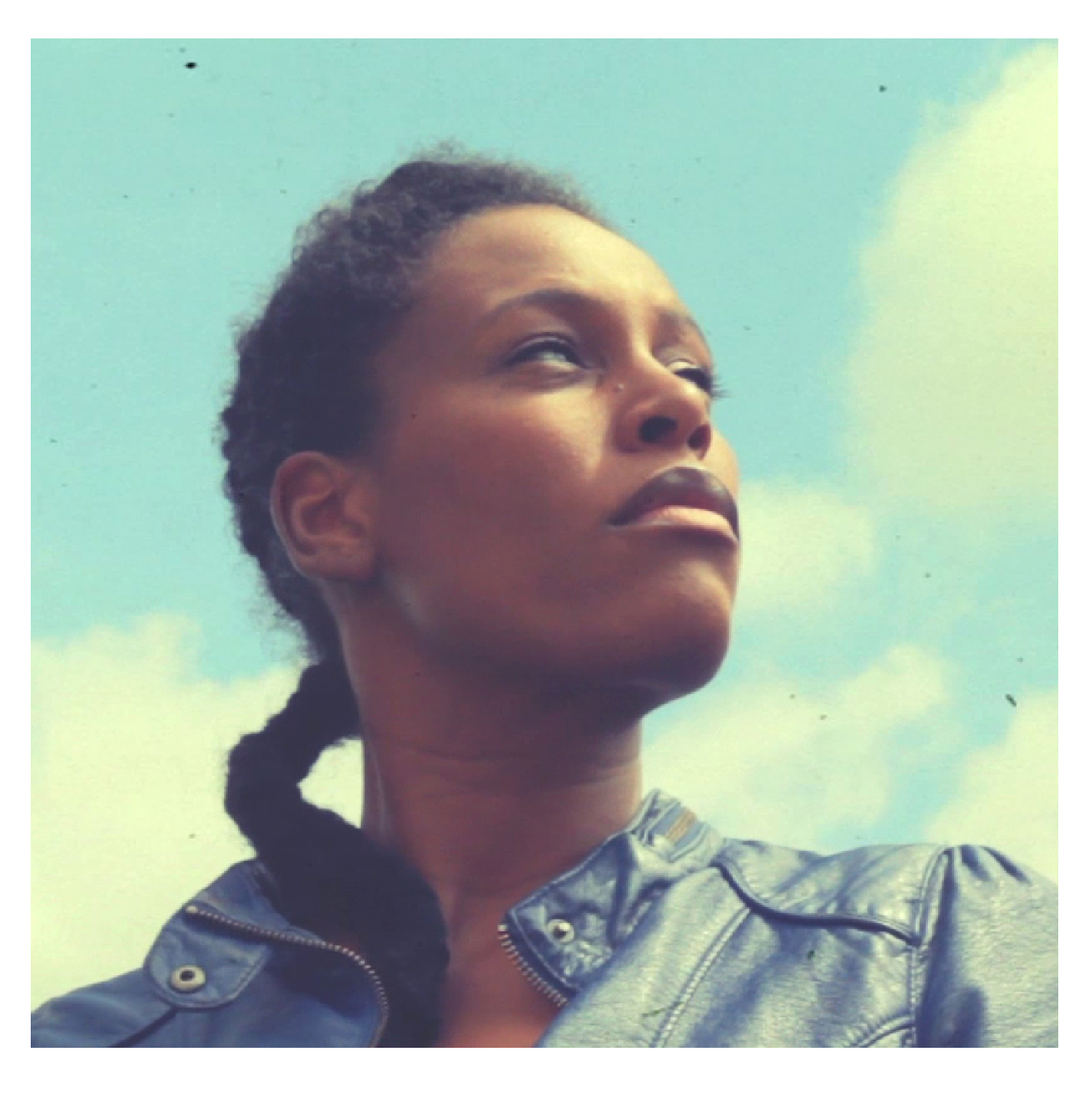
- Born: 15 November 1973 (age 52); Yaoundé
- Occupations: Actress, screenwriter, presenter, film editor
- Years active: 1996-present

Sandra Nkaké (born 15 November 1973) is a French-Cameroonian actress and singer.

== Biography ==
Nkaké was born in Yaoundé, Cameroon in 1973. At the age of 12, she moved to France. Nkaké was passionate about music from an early age, particularly Prince whom she discovered as a teenager. However, she desired to become an English teacher and studied in Paris at the Sorbonne. When she was 20, she turned her attention towards the theater, auditioning for a role and becoming an actress. Nkaké made her debut in The Crucible in 1994, directed by Thomas Ledouarec. The following year, she had a role in Le Dindon.

Nkaké made her film debut in Les Deux Papas et la Maman in 1996, directed by Jean-Marc Longval. Several films and TV films followed, but Nkaké remained focused on her music career as well. In 1996, she participated in the Ollano trip-hop project alongside Hélène Noguerra. During the 2000s, Nkaké collaborated in the studio and on stage with several artists, such as Jacques Higelin, Daniel Yvinec and the National Jazz Orchestra, Julien Lourau, and Rodolphe Burger. She worked with Gerald Toto and David Walters for the Urban Kreol project.

In 2008, Nkaké released her debut album Mansaadi, supporting the record with over 200 concerts around the world, including tours in Africa and Brazil. She recorded a tribute to Donny Hathaway on Stéphane Belmondo's 2011 album Ever After. In 2012 her second album Nothing for Granted came out, which was co-written with her associate Ji Drû. This album was released on Jazz Village record label. Nkaké's expressive voice made her a staple on the French soul scene. She received the Frank Ténot prize at the Victoires du Jazz ceremony in July 2012. In September 2017, she released her third album Tangerine Moon Wishes, which she considered her most personal record.

Since 2007, she has lived in the Paris suburb of Saint-Denis, Seine-Saint-Denis.

== Discography ==
- 2008 : Mansaadi (Cornershop/Naïve)
- 2012 : Nothing For Granted (Jazz Village/Harmonia Mundi)
- 2017 : Tangerine Moon Wishes (Jazz Village)
- 2023 : Scars

== Filmography ==
- 1996 : Les Deux Papas et la Maman
- 2000 : The Girl
- 2003 : Bienvenue au gîte
- 2004 : Casablanca Driver
- 2009 : King Guillaume
- 2011 : Toi, moi, les autres
- 2014 : Not My Type
- 2015 : Mes chers disparus (TV series) : Brigitte Elbert
- 2016 : Bienvenue au Gondwana
- 2017 : La Fin De La Nuit : Nanda
- 2017 : Une saison en France
- 2018 : Photo de Famille
