= Agathe de La Boulaye =

French actress

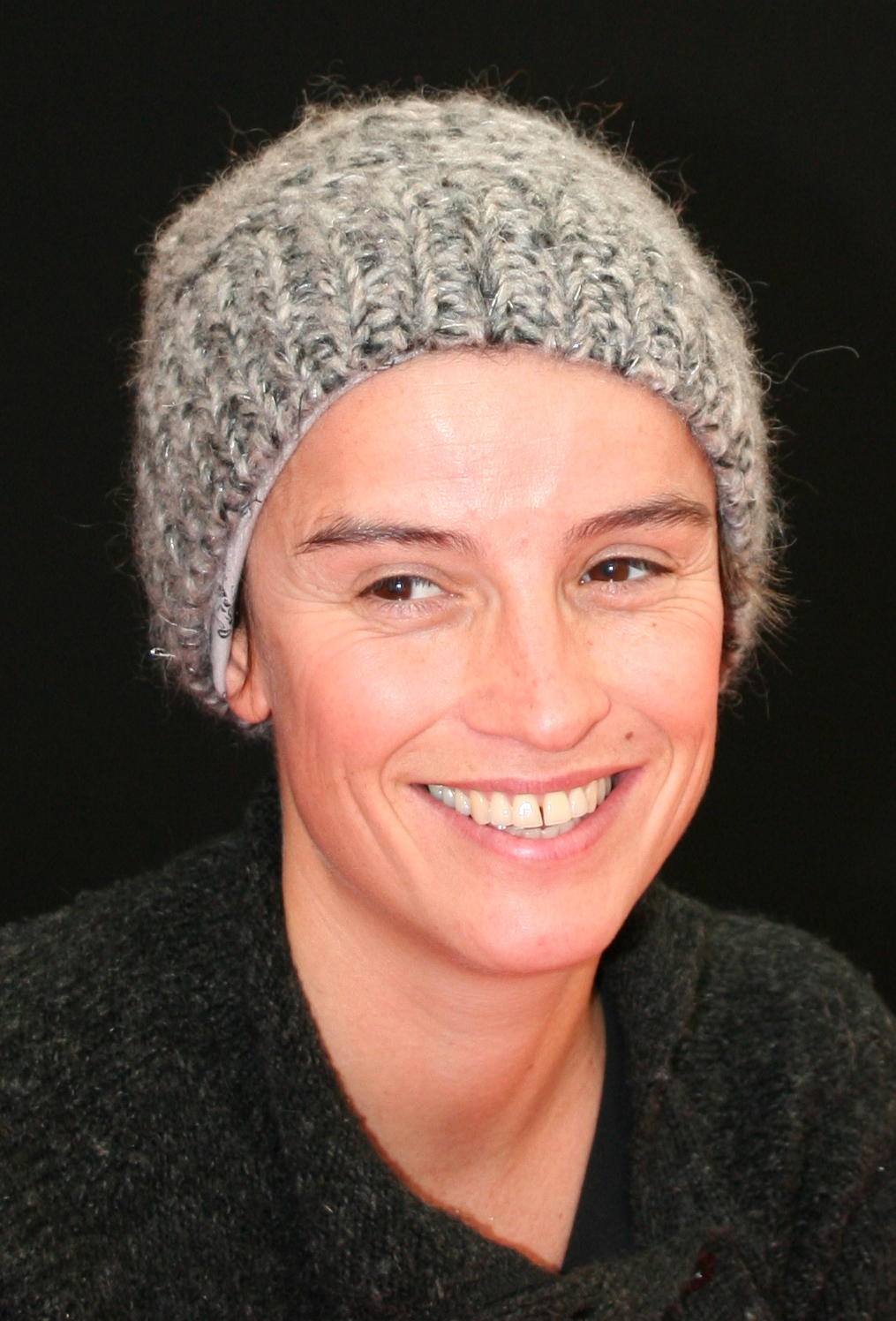
- Born: 1972 (age 53–54); Paris, France
- Years active: 1995 - present

Agathe de La Boulaye is a French film and television actress. She played Adele Rousseau in 2004 science fiction film Alien vs. Predator. In 2008 she played quadriplegic psychiatrist Claire Etxebarra in the television series Disparitions, retour aux sources.

== Filmography ==
- Jefferson in Paris (1995) as card player
- Highlander: The Raven (1999) as Christina — TV series; 1 episode
- La Crim' (1999–2001) as Caroline Tessier — TV series; 13 episodes
- The Girl (2000) as The Artist
- Largo Winch (2001) as Diana Murray — TV series; 2 episodes
- Michel Vaillant (2003) as Gabrielle Spangenberg
- Alien vs. Predator (2004) as Adele Rousseau
- The Last Drop (2005) as Katrina
- Dying God (2008) as Angel
- Disparitions, retour aux sources (2008) as Claire Etxebarra — TV series; 10 episodes
