= Graham Pountney =

British actor

- Born: Graham Michael Pountney; 6 February 1953 (age 73); London, England
- Education: Bristol Old Vic Theatre School
- Occupations: Actor, director
- Spouse: Suki Turner

Graham Michael Pountney (born 6 February 1953) is a British actor.

His television credits include: Angels, The Cleopatras, Howards' Way, Peak Practice, Doctors, Sea of Souls, Hustle and New Tricks.
