= The Girl (2000 film) =

- Region 1 DVD cover
- Directed by: Sande Zeig
- Written by: Monique Wittig; Sande Zeig
- Produced by: Dolly Hall
- Starring: Claire Keim; Agathe De La Boulaye; Cyril Lecomte; Sandra Nkake
- Cinematography: Georges Lechaptois
- Edited by: Keiko Deguchi; Geraldine Peroni
- Music by: Richard Robbins
- Distributed by: Artistic License
- Release dates: September 9, 2000 (Canada); April 20, 2001 (U.S.)
- Running time: 84 minutes
- Countries: United States; France
- Languages: English, French
- Box office: $104,883 (US sub-total)

The Girl is a 2000 American/French romantic drama film directed by Sande Zeig. It is a love story set in Paris between "the Artist" (Agathe De La Boulaye) and "the Girl" (Claire Keim), based on a story by Zeig's partner Monique Wittig. It was negatively received by critics.

== Plot ==
The film is narrated by Agathe De La Boulaye as "The Artist". She is obsessed with a nightclub singer (Claire Keim) whom she calls "The Girl". One night the girl takes the artist to the hotel where she lives and they make love. The girl, who does not usually sleep with women, tells the artist that it is "just one night" but they begin seeing each other. The girl continues to see men and the artist has a long term lover, Bu Savè (Sandra Nkake), who accepts the artist's obsession.

The artist draws and paints the girl, but gradually grows frustrated with her work. She notices a man (Cyril Lecomte) watching her and the girl. The man behaves aggressively and possessively towards the girl. He starts following the artist and sends threatening letters to the girl telling her to get rid of the artist. The girl refuses. The man follows the artist and tries to attack her. The artist asks advice from Bu Savè, who gives her a gun.

When the artist cannot find the girl, she discovers that she has gone away with the man, who turns out to be the owner of the nightclub where the girl sings. When the man and the girl return, the artist gives the girl the gun.

The artist gets beaten up by the man and his friend. Later when she goes to meet the girl at the hotel, she finds the man there, naked and asleep. She leaves. The next day she returns and tells the girl that she is leaving her. The artist puts all her energy into her painting. One day she goes back to the hotel. As she climbs the stairs, she hears gunshots. She finds the man dead and the girl with a gunshot wound to her side.

== Cast ==
- Claire Keim as The Girl, a nightclub jazz singer. The narrator calls her "Agnus Dei".
- Agathe De La Boulaye as The Narrator, and artist. The girl calls her "Lover".
- Cyril Lecomte as The Man, owner of the nightclub where the girl sings. He has a past with the girl and tries to stop her seeing the narrator.
- Sandra Nkake as Bu Savè, the narrator's long-term lover.
- Ronald Guttman as Bartender
- Cyrille Hertel as Bodyguard
- Pascal Cervo as Hotel Clerk
- Franck Prévost as Piano Player
- Hélène Juren as Art School Model

== Production ==
The Girl was based on a short story of the same name by Zeig's partner French writer and theorist Monique Wittig. It was Wittig's first English language story. The screenplay was written by Wittig and Zeig. Zeig, an American, said of her decision to shoot the film in France, "I don't feel like an American independent filmmaker. I'm just not inspired to shoot in America with American stories."

== Ratings and distribution ==
The Girl was unrated in the United States. In the United Kingdom it was rated 15 and in Germany it was rated 12. It premiered on September 9, 2000, at the Toronto International Film Festival. It went on to appear in 2001 at the Turin International Gay and Lesbian Film Festival and the Berlin Film Festival. It was given a limited theatrical release in the United States on April 20, 2001, distributed by Zeig's company Artistic License.

== Reception ==
Rotten Tomatoes gave The Girl a "rotten" rating of 13% based on 30 reviews. Metacritic gave it a "generally negative" rating of 34% based on 14 reviews.
