= Sande Zeig =

American film director and writer

- Born: New York City, U.S.
- Occupations: Film director, writer
- Years active: 1994–present
- Partner: Monique Wittig

Sande Zeig is an American film director and writer. She was the partner of late French feminist writer Monique Wittig. She directed the 2000 romantic drama The Girl, and founded the film distribution company Artistic License Films.

== Biography ==
Sande Zeig is from New York City and is of Jewish heritage. She studied theater in Wisconsin and Paris. In 1975, Zeig was living in Paris, studying mime and teaching karate, when she met the writer Monique Wittig.

Zeig and Wittig co-wrote the French book Brouillon pour un dictionnaire des amantes, which they both later translated into the English Lesbian Peoples: Material for a Dictionary. The work is a piece of metafiction, using its own form and contents to critique the male-centric viewpoints commonly used in encyclopedic dictionaries. The entries in their encyclopedia describe a fictional lesbian utopia, and in the original French edition, even nouns and pronouns which would normally have masculine endings are written with feminine endings instead. The entry for Sappho is one blank page, which scholar Jack Winkler describes as appropriate and refreshing given Sappho's poetry and reception. In the title of the French edition, Brouillon means rough draft. Scholar Kristine Anderson interprets this as a comment on how much more of the lesbian world exists than can be captured in the work, and more broadly, a reminder that all encyclopedias fail to capture a full portrayal of the world.

Zeig and Wittig collaborated on a theater piece called "The Constant Journey." They used distancing effects and subverted theater conventions to alienate the audience, allowing for more lesbian themes to come through in the work.

Zeig and Jeff Lunger were primary programmers for the New Festival for several years, choosing experimental films with the goal of attracting the attention and respect of the art-film industry. The board replaced them in 1993 with a selection committee, with the goal of choosing a new palate of films that would be more commercial and help the festival connect with sponsors and distributors.

Zeig's 2000 film, The Girl is based on a short story by Wittig. Her 2008 biographical film Soul Masters: Dr. Guo and Dr. Sha follows the work of two Chinese healers, one of whom had previously treated Zeig's father. Zeig is the founder of New York City film distribution company Artistic License Films.

Wittig, Zeig's partner of many years, died on January 3, 2003.

== Filmography ==
- Central Park (1994)
- The Girl (2000)
- Soul Masters: Dr. Guo and Dr. Sha (2008)
- Apache 8 (2011)
- Sister Jaguar's Journey (2015)
- The Living Saint of Thailand: Venerable Mae Chee Sansanee Sthirasuta(2019)
- Firelighters:Fire Is Medicine(2024)

== Bibliography ==
- Lesbian Peoples: Material for a Dictionary (Brouillon pour un dictionnaire des amantes) — coauthored with Monique Wittig

== See also ==
- List of female film and television directors
- List of lesbian filmmakers
- List of LGBT-related films directed by women
