= Julie Wyman =

American body image professor

- Born: Julie Wyman
- Occupations: screenwriter; producer; director; cinematographer; professor
- Years active: 1998-present

Julie Wyman is an American director, cinematographer, and professor whose work is concerned with body image. She mainly makes documentary film and currently teaches at UC Davis as an associate professor of Cinema and Digital Media.

== Early life and education ==
Julie Wyman received a BA in Anthropology and English from Amherst College in 1993. She completed a MFA in Visual Studies at UC San Diego in 2002.

== Career ==
A Boy Named Sue documents the transition of a FTM person named Theo. The film delves into the physical and emotional effects of medical transitioning as well as the changes in the way Theo interacted with the world and the world interacted with him. It won the Sappho award for Best Documentary in 2000 and was nominated for the Gay and Lesbian Alliance Against Defamation's Best Documentary Media Award.

In 2012 she released her full-length documentary Strong! about three-time Olympic competitor Cheryl Haworth. Strong! credits include Cinematographer Anne Etheridge, Editors Jennifer Chinlund and Vicky Funari, and Executive Producer Vivian Kleiman. Strong! aired on PBS's Independent Lens series in 2012.

== Honors ==
Wyman's film A Boy Named Sue won the Sappho award for Best Documentary in 2000 and was nominated for the Gay and Lesbian Alliance Against Defamation's Best Documentary Media Award in the same year but did not win.

In 2012, Wyman won the Princess Grace Award for Film Honorarium.

== Filmography ==
Year	Title	Credited as					Notes
Year	Title	Director	Writer	Cinematographer	Actor	Producer	Notes
1998	Enjoy	Yes	Yes		Yes		Short film made with Gordon Winiemko
2000	A Boy Named Sue	Yes		Yes	Yes		Documentary
2002	Exchange Policy	Yes		Yes	Yes		Short film made with Gordon Winiemko
2002	Buoyant	Yes					Short Documentary
2012	Strong!		Yes		Yes	Documentary Featured in PBS' Independent Lens	
2016	FatMob				Yes	Short film	

== See also ==
- Body positivity
- Feminist art
- Women's cinema
- List of LGBT-related films directed by women
