= Stéphan Guérin-Tillié =

French actor and filmmaker

Stéphan Guérin-Tillié (Reims, 20 June 1972) is a French actor, director, and screen writer. He is most known for his role in Just a Question of Love (Juste une question d'amour). Guérin-Tillié has directed the films Edy (with a soundtrack by Nils Petter Molvær), Requiem(s), and J'ai fait des sandwichs pour la route, and acted in a number of films and television roles.

== Work ==
=== Filmography ===
Motion Pictures
Year	Film
1996	Dans la cour des grands
1996	Belles Du Louvre
1997	Quatre Garçons pleins d'avenir
1999	En attendant l'an 2000
1999	J'ai fait des sandwiches pour la route
1999	Juste une question d'amour
1999	Quand fond la neige où va le blanc ?
2000	Carpe Diem
2000	Quelques jours de trop
2001	HS - Hors Service
2001	Huereuse
2002	La Sirène rouge
2002	Doggy Dog
2004	Je m'indiffère
2004	Le grand rôle
2005	Cavalcade
2007	Le Fils de l'épicier
2010	Turk's Head
2013	Turning Tide

Television
Year	Show
1993	Antoine Rives, juge du terrorisme
1994	Les Nuiteux
1994	Julie Lescaut
1995	Une femme dans la nuit
1995	La Rivière Espérance
1996	Les Liens du cœur
1996	L'Orange de Noël
1996	Château Magot
1997	Les Héritiers
1998	Le Comte de Monté Cristo
1998	Les Marmottes
1999	Juliette
2000	La Pierre à marier
2000	Just a Question of Love
2001	Les Redoutables
2001	Parmi l'élite
2001	Margaux Valence : le Secret d'Alice
2003	Sous le soleil : Un bébé noir dans un couffin blanc
2004	Zodiaque
2004	Boulevard du Palais
2004	L'Île maudite
2005	Le Maître du Zodiaque
2006	Double Peine
2006	Giordano
2006	Greco
2006	Confidences sur canapé
2007	Dans la peau d'un autre
2007	Suspectes
2016	Capitaine Marleau

=== Writing ===
Year	Title
1999	J'ai fait des sandwichs pour la route
2005	Edy
2001	Requiem(s)
2000	Marie, Nonna, la vierge et moi
2015	Capitaine Marleau

=== Directing ===
Year	Title
2005	Edy
2001	Requiem(s)
1999	J'ai fait des sandwichs pour la route
2001	teto(s)
