= All Due Respect (The Sopranos) =

- The Sopranos episode
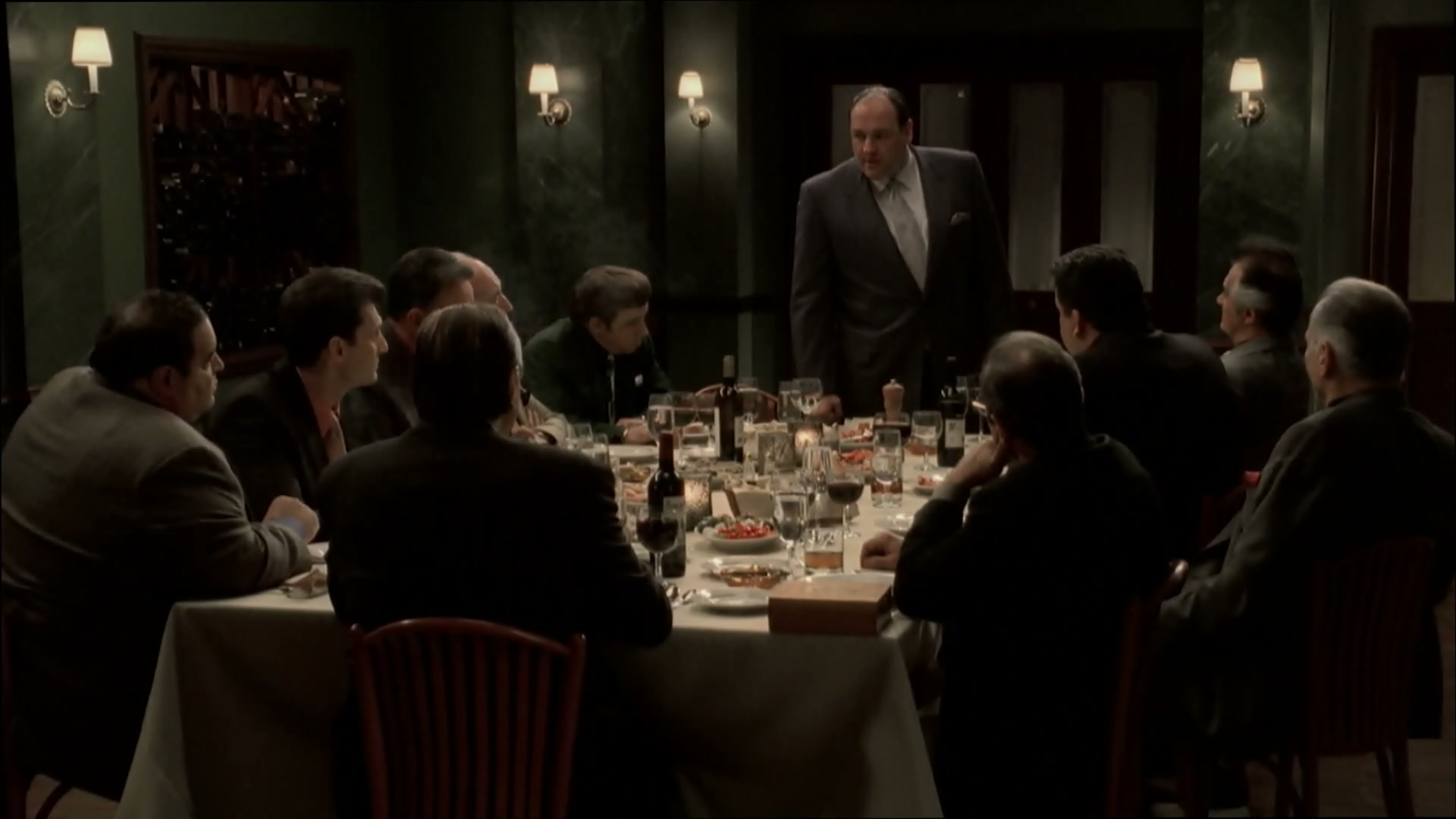
- Tony Soprano delivers a speech at Ray Curto's birthday dinner
- Episode no.: Season 5 Episode 13
- Directed by: John Patterson
- Written by: David Chase; Robin Green; Mitchell Burgess
- Cinematography by: Phil Abraham
- Production code: 513
- Original air date: June 6, 2004
- Running time: 55 minutes

Episode chronology
← Previous "Long Term Parking"	Next → "Members Only"
- The Sopranos season 5

"All Due Respect" is the 65th episode of the HBO original series The Sopranos and the finale of the show's fifth season. Written by David Chase, Robin Green, and Mitchell Burgess, and directed by John Patterson, it originally aired on June 6, 2004.

The episode had 11 million viewers and was the second most watched program on U.S. cable television for the week. Critical reception was positive, with praise for the conclusions of plot lines and use of dark humor.

== Starring ==
- James Gandolfini as Tony Soprano
- Lorraine Bracco as Dr. Jennifer Melfi
- Edie Falco as Carmela Soprano
- Michael Imperioli as Christopher Moltisanti
- Dominic Chianese as Corrado Soprano, Jr.
- Steven Van Zandt as Silvio Dante
- Tony Sirico as Paulie Gualtieri
- Robert Iler as Anthony Soprano, Jr.
- Jamie-Lynn DiScala as Meadow Soprano
- Drea de Matteo as Adriana La Cerva **
- Aida Turturro as Janice Soprano Baccalieri *
- Steven R. Schirripa as Bobby Baccalieri
- Vincent Curatola as Johnny Sack
- and Steve Buscemi as Tony Blundetto

* = credit only ** = picture only

=== Guest starring ===
- Jerry Adler as Hesh Rabkin

=== Also guest starring ===
- Tom Aldredge as Hugh De Angelis
- Denise Borino as Ginny Sacrimoni
- Max Casella as Benny Fazio
- Tony Darrow as Larry Boy Barese
- Jessica Dunphy as Devin Pillsbury
- Robert Funaro as Eugene Pontecorvo
- Joseph R. Gannascoli as Vito Spatafore
- Dan Grimaldi as Patsy Parisi
- Marianne Leone as Joanne Moltisanti
- George Loros as Raymond Curto
- David Margulies as Neil Mink
- Arthur Nascarella as Carlo Gervasi
- Vinny Vella as Jimmy Petrille
- Frank Vincent as Phil Leotardo
- Cameron Boyd as Matt Testa
- Chris Caldovino as Billy Leotardo
- Frank Pando as Agent Grasso
- William DeMeo as Jason Molinaro
- Louis Mustillo as Sal Vitro
- Anthony J. Ribustello as Dante Greco
- Bethany Pagliolo as Estela
- Bob Shaw as Ignatz Pravalkis
- Charles Anthony Burks as Technician
- Paul Diomede as Jason Musucci

== Synopsis ==
A.J. plans a party with a friend, and they end up making $300 profit each. Carmela tells Tony that A.J. asked his guidance counselor which colleges would be suitable for studying event planning. They find some solace in the fact that the boy is at least "fired up about something."

Christopher disposes of Adriana's last remaining possessions. Carmela phones looking for her, and Chris says that they broke up and she left town. Tony asks Chris whether he said anything to Adriana about Matthew Bevilaqua or Ralphie Cifaretto that she could have repeated to the FBI. Chris says he did not and assures Tony that he is staying sober and exercising. The two share a long, emotional hug before Tony departs.

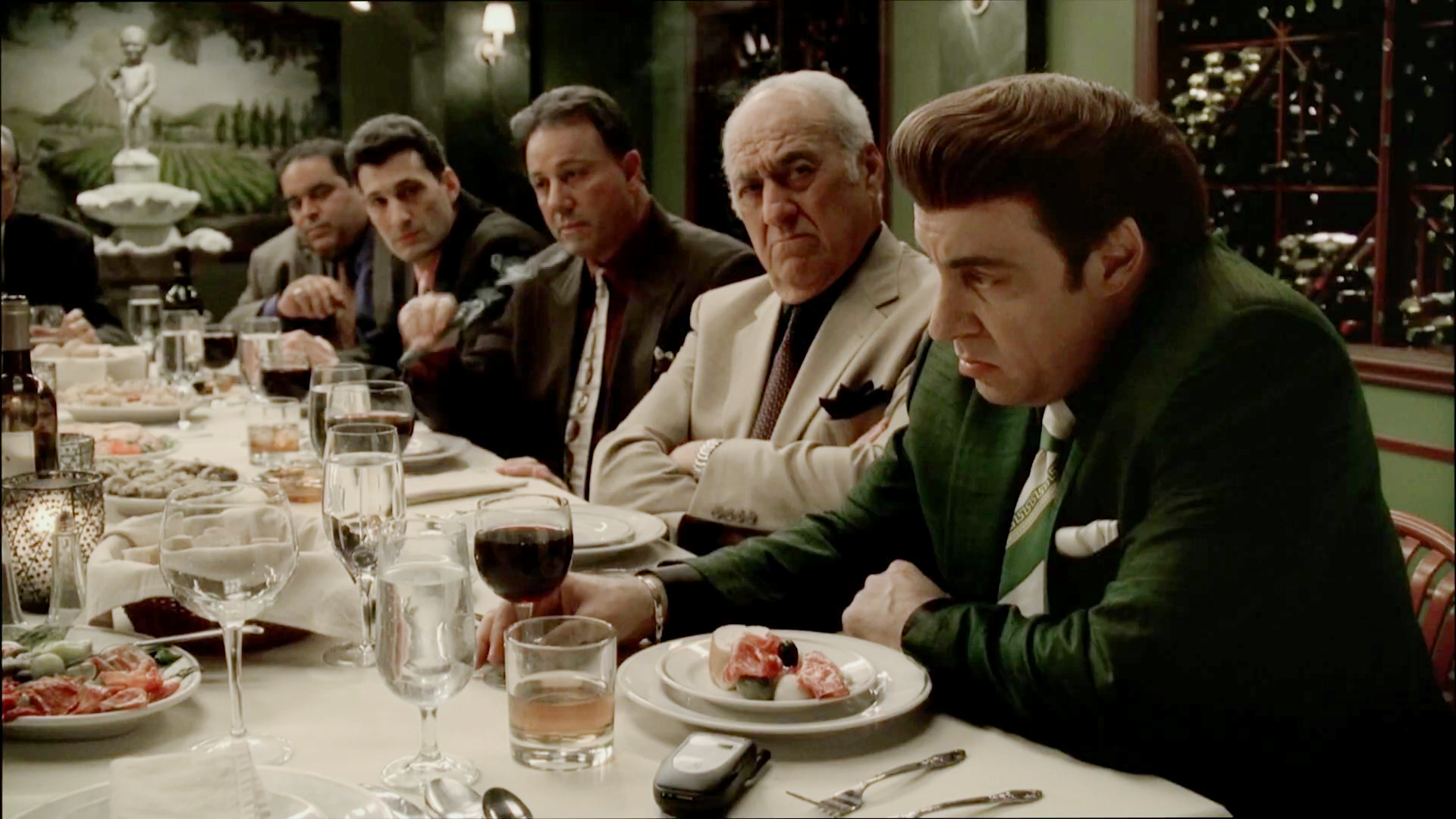
Ray's birthday dinner

Phil reclaims his brother Billy's body from the morgue and demands that Johnny retaliate against the New Jersey family. Ray Curto, who continues to provide information to the FBI, unaware that Adriana has been killed for being an informant, has a birthday dinner. Those present are restive at Tony's continued protection of his cousin, Tony B; with Phil seeking revenge, they are all in danger. Tony delivers a speech, explaining that he is saving Tony B from torture and stressing that they must unite as a family. They are largely unconvinced by his words.

Phil tries to track down Chris as an alternative target of his revenge, noting his closeness to Tony. After he threatens Chris's mother, Chris goes into hiding with the help of Benny. Phil finds Benny and beats him up, fracturing his skull. Tony goes to Junior for advice, but he cannot help with his dementia worsening. At a consultation, Dr. Melfi reminds Tony that his concern for Tony B comes primarily from his feelings of guilt. Silvio tells Tony of the growing discontent within the family and asserts he is shielding Tony B out of pride, which Tony angrily rejects.

Tony visits Paulie, having heard he is among those dissatisfied with his leadership. In Paulie's living room, he discovers the painting of himself with his horse Pie-O-My, which he had wanted to be destroyed after the horse's death. Unbeknownst to him, Paulie had kept the painting and had it altered, changing Tony's clothes to those of a colonial general. When Tony demands to know why he had him painted as a "lawn jockey", Paulie says that he did it out of sincere admiration for Tony as a leader. Tony pauses, but then rips the painting off the wall and puts it in a dumpster, much to Paulie's discontent. Looking at the painting one last time, Tony now realises he must kill Tony B for the sake of the rest of the family.

Tony B is hiding out at Uncle Pat's vacated farmhouse in Kinderhook, New York. As he is returning with groceries, Tony appears around a corner with a pump-action shotgun and kills him. Tony then tells Phil and Johnny where Tony B can be found. Phil arrives expecting to exact his revenge, but only finds the body. Johnny tells Tony that Tony B's death "didn't solve a thing."

Tony meets Johnny at his New Jersey house and offers a percentage of Tony B's Bloomfield Avenue casino as a peace offering to Phil. At the moment the feud is settled, Tony looks over Johnny's shoulder and sees armed men approaching. They both run away. It is the FBI, who arrest Johnny. Tony throws his handgun into the snow and navigates the neighborhood to avoid the Feds. A few hours later, he calls his lawyer, Neil Mink, who informs him that Johnny was betrayed by Jimmy Petrille, his consigliere. Tony was not mentioned in the indictment. He arrives home disheveled and worn out.

== Deceased ==
- Tony Blundetto: Shot and killed by Tony Soprano in order to make peace with the Lupertazzi crime family and to save Tony B from a more painful death at the hands of Phil Leotardo.

== Title reference ==
- Vito prefaces his criticism with "All due respect" when discussing the family's problems with New York with the other captains. In the previous episode, Rusty uses the same term when speaking to Little Carmine.
- Silvio does the same before criticizing Tony for having too much pride. The phrase is generally used before someone of equal or higher status is told something they don't want to hear. When answering Silvio, Tony repeats the phrase with ironic politeness.

== Production ==
- This is the final episode directed by John Patterson, who died in 2005. Patterson directed all the season finales for the first five seasons.
- At the end of the episode, Tony's emergence from the rustling bushes reaffirms the use of the bear as a symbol of Tony's dominating presence in his house. Based on the emerging location of the bear in earlier episodes, there is uncertainty as to the identity of the rustling figure.
- Bob Shaw, the production designer for the show, makes a cameo appearance as Ignatz Pravalkis, the architect working with Hugh De Angelis to create Carmela's spec house.
- Drea de Matteo reveals in the DVD commentary for the previous episode, "Long Term Parking," that the character of Tony Blundetto was not initially supposed to die in the fifth-season finale.
- The scene in which Johnny Sack is arrested is shown again in the sixth-season episode "Soprano Home Movies," but a different take is used.

== Music ==
- The song played over the end credits is "Glad Tidings" by Van Morrison. It is also played earlier when Christopher talks to Silvio at a Roy Rogers, and later during a scene where Tony B arrives at Uncle Pat's farm, shortly before his murder. A The Star-Ledger review of this episode explains the song's importance to the plot: "The episode's use of Van Morrison's "Glad Tidings" as a recurring motif was a classic example of the show's attention to detail. Moments before buckshot hit Blundetto, we heard the verse that opened with "And we'll send you glad tidings from New York" and closed with "Hope that you will come in right on time."
- In the scene wherein Tony is sitting on the steps of an elementary school, "Mr. Tambourine Man" is heard being sung by a children's choir.
- "Smoke N' Mirrors" by Grade 8 plays when Benny tries to leave after he saw Phil walk into the Crazy Horse.

== Reception ==
"All Due Respect" had 11 million viewers, about 1.5 million fewer viewers than the season four finale "Whitecaps", and finished second in the weekly Nielsen ratings for U.S. cable television.

Television Without Pity graded the episode with an A. Alan Sepinwall of The Star-Ledger praised the episode: "...it managed to wrap up most of this year's story arcs in tidy, if not spotless, fashion." For The New York Times, Alessandra Stanley called the episode "surprisingly tame", with "a satisfying amount of violence, psychology and dark humor." Liane Bonin had a mixed view of the episode's conclusion: "Watching Tony run through the snow like a wounded bear in a torn overcoat was undoubtedly memorable, but for the season to be tied up in such a tidy bow was a disappointment."
