= Joseph Rigano =

American actor

- Born: April 2, 1933; New York City
- Died: March 27, 2014 (aged 80); New York City
- Occupation: Actor

Joseph Rigano (April 2, 1933 – March 27, 2014) was an acclaimed American character actor known for his versatile performances in film, television, and theater. Born in New York City, Rigano established himself as a talented and respected actor throughout his career.

Rigano was born in New York City in 1933, and raised in Ocean Hill, Brooklyn. His filmography includes notable appearances in films such as Casino (1995), directed by Martin Scorsese, where he portrayed Vincent Borelli, alongside Robert De Niro and Joe Pesci. He appeared in gangster comedy Mickey Blue Eyes (1999), alongside Hugh Grant, Jeanne Tripplehorn and James Caan. He appeared in the movie The Crew (2000).

He died at age 80, on March 27, 2014, from throat cancer. He left behind his wife Maria, and their three adult children Angela, Joseph and Gina.

== Filmography ==
Year	Title	Role	Notes
1961	Hey, Let's Twist!	Vinnie	Uncredited
1965	Three Rooms in Manhattan	Jean	Uncredited
1969	Out of It	Vinnie	
1982	Dear Mr. Wonderful	Artie	
1995	Casino	Vincent Borelli	
1998	The City	The Contractor	
1999	Analyze This	Dominic Manetta	
1999	Ghost Dog: The Way of the Samurai	Joe Rags	
1999	Mickey Blue Eyes	Tony Risolli	
1999	Sweet and Lowdown	Stagehand	
2000	The Crew	Frankie 'Rash' Decuello	
2001	Twelve	Ed Danoff	
2002	Hollywood Ending	Projectionist	
2002	The Blue Lizard	Casino Guy	
2002	High Times' Potluck	Rigano	
2002	Four Deadly Reasons	Sapiro	
2003	This Thing of Ours	Joe	
2003	Coffee and Cigarettes	Joe	(segment "Those Things'll Kill Ya")
2003	Season of the Hunted	Joe	
2005	Johnny Slade's Greatest Hits	Sam	
2008	Meatballs, Tomatoes and Mobsters	Don Forchenzo	
2009	Mnemonica	The Messenger	
2010	Lotto	Benny The Bone	
2011	Humdinger	Carbone	(final film role)
