= Vincent Pastore =

American actor (1946–2026)

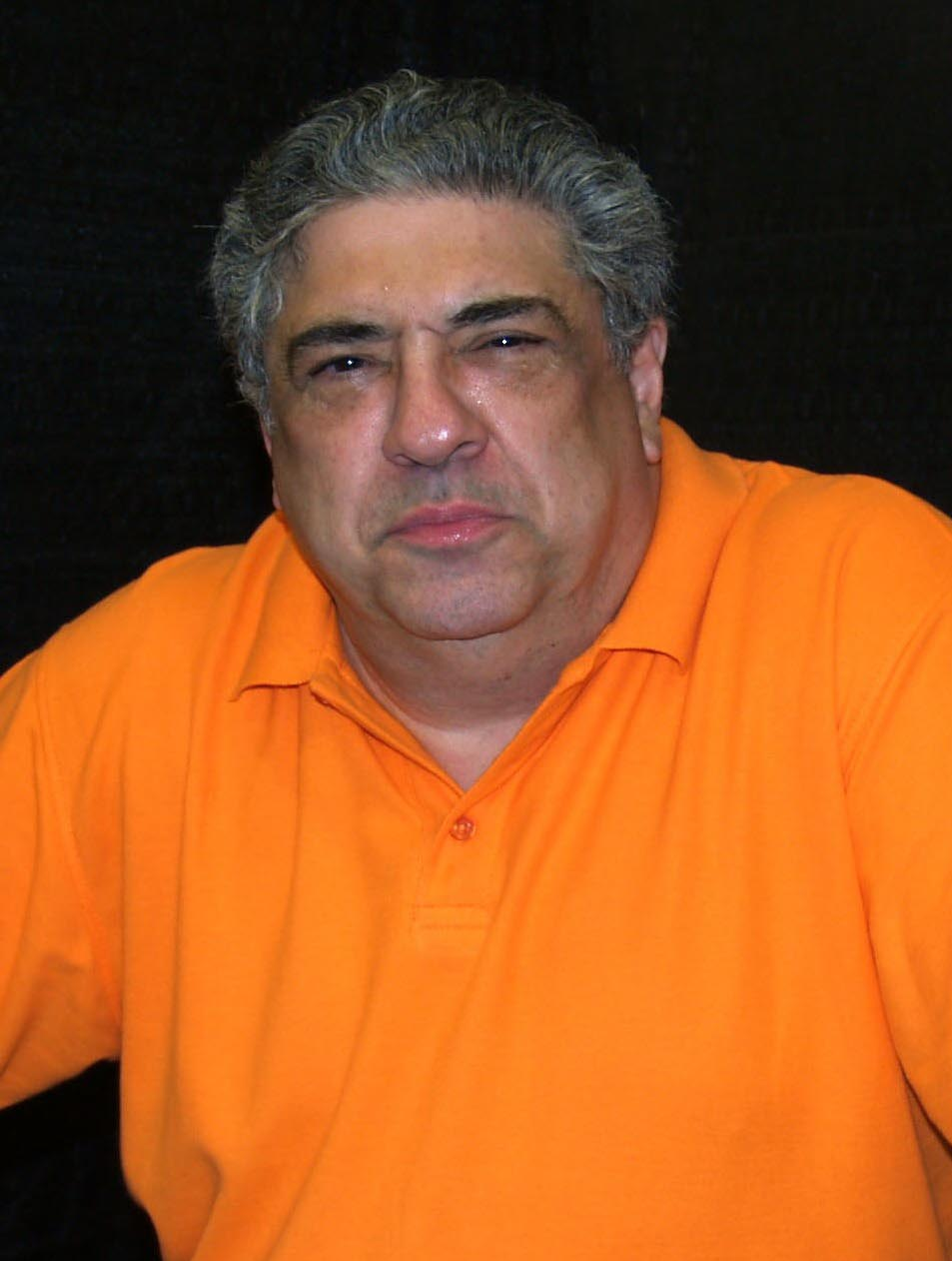
- Pastore in 2013
- Born: Vincent Dominic Pastore; July 14, 1946; New York City, U.S.
- Died: August 1, 2026 (aged 80); New York City, U.S.
- Education: Pace University
- Occupation: Actor
- Years active: 1988–2026
- Spouse: Nancy Berke (divorced)
- Children: 1
- Military career
- Branch: United States Navy
- Service years: 1964–1967

Vincent Dominic Pastore (/pæˈstɔːr/; July 14, 1946 – August 1, 2026) was an American actor. Often cast as a mafioso, he was perhaps best known for his portrayal of Salvatore "Big Pussy" Bonpensiero on the HBO drama series The Sopranos (1999–2007) earning a Screen Actors Guild Award.

Pastore started his career taking small parts in films such as Goodfellas (1990), Carlito's Way (1993), and Manhattan Murder Mystery (1993). He then made notable appearances in the HBO film Gotti (1996), Mickey Blue Eyes (1999), DreamWorks's Shark Tale (2004) and Revolver (2005).

On television, he took early small roles in Law & Order from 1992 to 1996, followed by recurring roles in the drama series Bull (2000), the sitcom Son of the Beach (2000–2002), the legal drama The Practice (2004), and the adult animated comedy series Aqua Teen Hunger Force (2008–2012). His final roles were in the Showtime satirical series The Curse (2024) and the thriller series Yellowjackets (2025).

On stage, he made his Broadway debut in Chicago (2007) followed by a role in the Woody Allen musical Bullets Over Broadway (2014).

== Early life ==
Vincent Dominic Pastore was born on July 14, 1946, to an Italian-American family in the Bronx, New York City, and grew up in an Italian-American neighborhood in New Rochelle, New York. Following his graduation from high school in 1964, he enlisted as a sailor in the U.S. Navy during the Vietnam War. He completed his basic training at Naval Station Great Lakes and was later assigned to Naval Air Station Quonset Point, Naval Station Norfolk and Naval Base San Diego. He was honorably discharged in 1967. He then received a degree in drama from Pace University. Pastore worked in the club business and as a chauffeur before eventually going into the acting industry after befriending Matt and Kevin Dillon.

== Career ==
=== 1988–1998: Early roles ===
Pastore made a career of portraying Italian-American gangsters in film and television. He began with small parts in the late 1980s and early 1990s, in films such as Goodfellas (1990) and Carlito's Way (1993). In Goodfellas, he is briefly seen rolling a coat rack through the kitchen of the Bamboo Lounge and is credited as "Vinny Pastore" playing "Man with Coat Rack". In Carlito's Way, he portrays one of the friends of the Italian man that dances with Gail, whom Kleinfeld insults. He is listed in the credits as "Vinny Pastore" playing "Copa Wiseguy". He also appeared in Flodders in America (1992), Money Train (1995), A Brooklyn State of Mind, The Last Don (both 1997), Witness to the Mob, Mafia! (both 1998), The Hurricane (1999), and The Deli. He appeared on Law & Order in various roles from 1992 to 1996.

Pastore got a bigger role in the comedy/crime film The Jerky Boys: The Movie (1995) as Tony Scarboni, one of the three gangsters and Lazarro's (played by Alan Arkin) clients. In the 1996 HBO television movie Gotti, Pastore played the character of Angelo Ruggiero, alongside future The Sopranos cast members Tony Sirico, Frank Vincent, and Dominic Chianese.

=== 1999–2007: Breakthrough with The Sopranos and Broadway debut ===
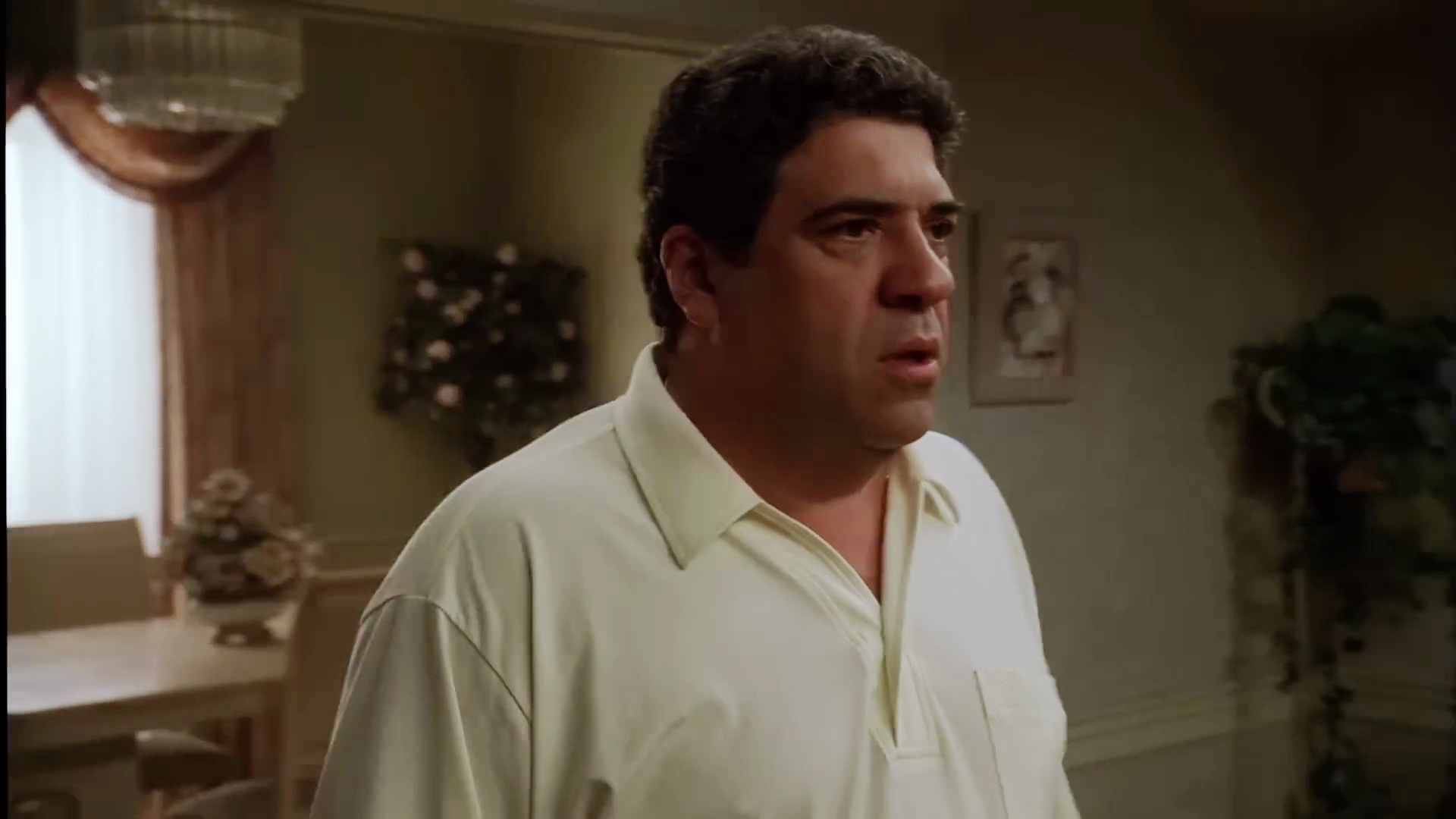
Pastore as Salvatore "Big Pussy" Bonpensiero on The Sopranos

In 1999, Pastore got his biggest role in the HBO series The Sopranos, where he played the character Salvatore "Big Pussy" Bonpensiero.

In addition to The Sopranos, he appeared in Mickey Blue Eyes, Two Family House (with The Sopranos castmates Michael Rispoli, Kathrine Narducci, Matt Servitto, Michele Santopietro, and Sharon Angela), Under Hellgate Bridge, Riding in Cars with Boys, Deuces Wild, Made, Serving Sara, American Cousins, A Tale of Two Pizzas, This Thing of Ours, Remedy, Shark Tale, Bachelor Party Vegas, Johnny Slade's Greatest Hits, and Guy Ritchie's Revolver.

Pastore's other television credits include Grounded for Life, character Vinnie Fellachio in Son of the Beach, the soap opera One Life to Live, host of Repo-Men/Stealing for a Living, Ed, Queens Supreme, Las Vegas, and Everybody Hates Chris.

Pastore lost 29 pounds (13 kg) on the fourth season of the VH1 reality show Celebrity Fit Club, which ran from August 6 to October 1, 2006.

On February 20, 2007, ABC announced that Pastore would participate in the fourth season of the American version of the competitive dance series Dancing with the Stars. He withdrew from the competition after only one week. Pastore said that he found the necessary training and preparation too physically demanding. John Ratzenberger took his place in the competition.

In 2007, Pastore starred in the independent feature film P.J.: A Journey of the Heart. Also in 2007, he made his Broadway debut in the musical Chicago as a replacement playing Amos Hart.

=== 2008–2026: Return to Broadway and reality show roles ===
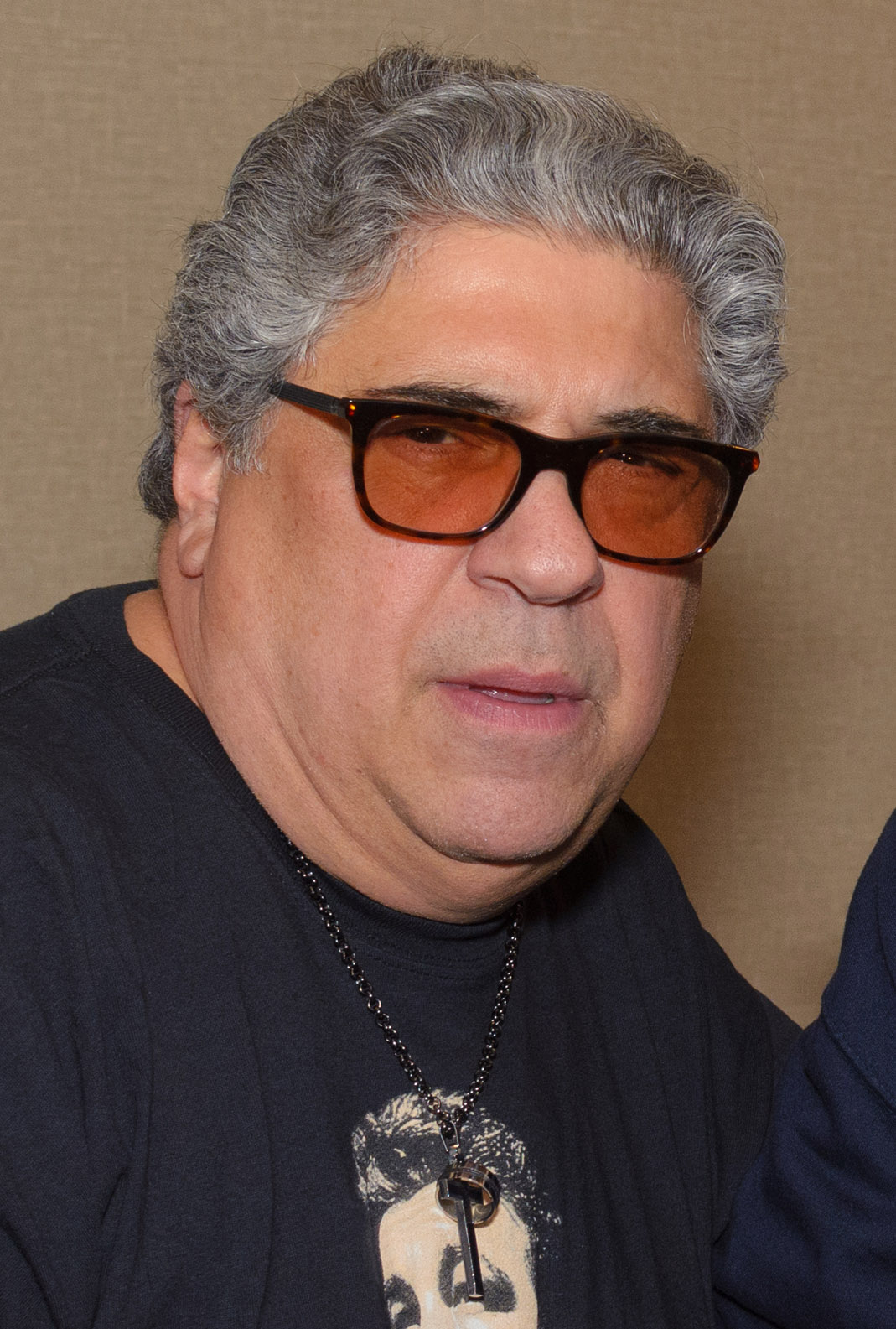
Pastore at the 2017 Chiller Theatre Expo, Parsippany, New Jersey

In 2008, Pastore joined the cast of General Hospital as Maximus Giambetti, the father of two other characters on the show. On this program he once again played a mobster. He had roles in 2008's College Road Trip and Our Last Days as Children. He also starred in the 2008 film Dough Boys and served as associate producer on the film.

Pastore was featured as a contestant on the January 2008 edition of Celebrity Apprentice. In the second week, he participated in raising $52,286 by selling hot dogs on a Manhattan street for the Lustgarten Foundation for Pancreatic Research. In a task of selling Broadway show tickets, with Pastore as project manager, he led his team to raise $33,300 for charity. In the fifth week, he got into a faked, blow-out conflict with the project manager of the task, Piers Morgan, to see if he could get the women to let him on their team to spy on them. The episode had played out like an episode of The Sopranos, with Pastore switching allegiances multiple times. Pastore was deliberately "ratted out" to the women by Morgan in the end, to make Pastore look bad to the women. While Pastore and the men then lost their task, before Trump even lifted a finger to fire anyone that week, Pastore resigned from the show and Trump eventually accepted Pastore's resignation after trying to convince him to stay. The show ended with a sequence based on the series finale of The Sopranos, ending abruptly before Pastore could give the customary end-of-show interview in the cab. The week-6 episode begins with Pastore meeting his ex-wife Nancy in a restaurant and presenting her the check he received for being project manager for $50,000, in memory of her husband Mitchell Burke's memorial fund with the Lustgarden Foundation.

On July 1, 2008, Pastore appeared on NBC's new show, Celebrity Family Feud, as part of a family team trying to win $50,000 for their favorite charity. He first competed, with his friends and family, against the cast of The Girls Next Door. Then, Pastore's team made it to the finals against Kathie Lee Gifford's family, but did not win. Pastore and his team picked up a $10,000 consolation prize for their charity researching a cure for pancreatic cancer.

In 2009, Pastore starred in Pavaline Studio's debut short film, Alienated. In 2010, he starred in the award-winning indie mob-comedy Pizza with Bullets. On April 8, 2011, Pastore and a business partner appeared on Shark Tank for an investment in "Broccoli Wad", a money clip. All the "Sharks" wanted out, and Barbara Corcoran said, "this is one of the dumbest things I've ever seen on this show". She later had the idea of putting Pastore's face and name on the box, and labeling it "Vinnie's Wad". She offered $50,000 for a 40% stake in the company, and would give half of her ownership to Pastore in exchange for his name and face on the packaging; Pastore and his partner agreed. A year later, Pastore made an appearance on an episode of truTV's World's Smartest Inventions after his commercial for "the Broccoli Wad" aired on the show.

On July 10, 2011, he appeared on the VH1 Marc Cronin-produced reality show Famous Food. In the show, contestants are assigned the task of opening a restaurant on the Sunset Strip. Pastore played Mayor Avenoso in the 2012 indie feature Surviving Family. He also appeared in the TV series Blue Bloods, The Making of the Mob: Chicago, and an uncredited voice role in the television program Aqua Teen Hunger Force as Terry. He featured in the 2013 films The Family, Once Upon a Time in Brooklyn, and I'm in Love with a Church Girl. In 2014, he returned to Broadway as Nick Valenti in the Woody Allen musical Bullets Over Broadway opposite Zach Braff. He appeared with Joseph R. Gannascoli on Gordon Ramsay's 24 Hours to Hell and Back on January 21, 2020.

== Other ventures ==
=== Radio and podcast ===
Pastore hosted The Wiseguy Show on Sirius Satellite Radio on the now defunct Raw Dog channel 104. Described as a "weekly three-hour celebration of Italian-American culture." Produced by Sopranos co-star Steven Van Zandt, it aired on Wednesdays from 6–9 pm ET. He also had stints as a radio host on the New Rochelle, New York, station WVOX in 2004 and 2012, with guest appearances in between.

In September 2020, Pastore started a podcast with Goumba Johnny called Fuhgeddaboudit with Vinny Pastore.

=== Vincent Pastore's Italian Sauce ===
In 2019, Pastore launched a tomato sauce business under the name of Vincent Pastore's Italian Sauce. The sauce is made with San Marzano tomatoes, is not GMO, and has no added sugar.

== Personal life and death ==
Pastore was divorced from Nancy Berke with whom he had a daughter. He befriended Berke's subsequent husband and donated the winnings from his stint on The Apprentice to a charity in his name. Pastore was diagnosed with prostate cancer in 2014. He served as the grand marshal of the Columbus Day parade in the Bronx the same year. He lived on City Island in the northeastern Bronx.

Pastore was found dead at his City Island residence on August 1, 2026. He had last been seen three days prior, and had last made contact with his neighbor via phone on July 31. He was 80 years old. His funeral was held in New Rochelle on August 6.

== Acting credits ==
=== Film ===
Year	Title	Role	Notes
1988	Black Roses	Tony's Dad	
1989	True Love	Angelo	
1990	Q & A	Man Sitting at Bar	Uncredited
1990	Tales from the Darkside: The Movie	Man in Art Gallery	
1990	Backstreet Dreams	Fat Tony	
1990	State of Grace	Borelli's Man	Uncredited
1990	Goodfellas	Man with Coatrack	
1990	Men of Respect	Sammy	
1990	Awakenings	Ward #5 Patient #6	
1991	New Jack City	Mobster	Uncredited
1992	Flodders in America	Man without Petrol	
1993	Who's the Man?	Tony 'Clams' Como	
1993	Manhattan Murder Mystery	Man in Restaurant	
1993	Carlito's Way	Copa Wiseguy	
1994	The Ref	State Trooper	
1994	It Could Happen to You	Bowling Team Member #1	
1994	Who Do I Gotta Kill?	Aldo "Birdman" Badamo	
1995	The Basketball Diaries	Construction Worker	
1995	The Jerky Boys: The Movie	Tony Scarboni	
1995	Money Train	Gambler	
1996	Walking and Talking	Laura's Devil-Seeing Patient	
1996	Sunset Park	Charlie the Super	
1996	Joe's Apartment	Apartment Broker #2	
1996	Night Falls on Manhattan	Cop #3	
1997	All Over Me	Don	
1997	The Deli	Lou	
1997	Six Ways to Sunday	Uncle Max	
1998	A Brooklyn State of Mind	Vinnie "D"	
1998	Mafia!	Gorgoni	
1999	Mickey Blue Eyes	Al	
1999	The Hurricane	Alfred Bello	
2000	Blue Moon	Joey	
2000	Two Family House	Angelo	
2001	Made	Jimmy	
2001	Corky Romano	Tony	
2001	Riding in Cars with Boys	Uncle Lou	
2002	This Thing of Ours	Skippy	
2002	Deuces Wild	Father Aldo	
2002	Serving Sara	Tony	
2003	American Cousins	Tony	
2004	The Cookout	Poo Salesman	
2004	Shark Tale	Luca (voice)	
2005	Remedy	Casper Black	
2005	Revolver	Zach	
2006	Bachelor Party Vegas	Carmine / Mr. Kidd	Video
2006	Last Request	Father Patton	
2008	College Road Trip	Freddy	
2008	Return to Sleepaway Camp	Frank	Direct to video
2009	Oy Vey! My Son Is Gay!!	Carmine Ferraro	
2012	Surviving Family	Mayor Avenoso	
2013	Once Upon a Time in Brooklyn	Luigi Leone	
2013	The Family	Fat Willy	
2013	Torture Chamber	Dr. Fiore	
2013	I'm in Love with a Church Girl	Nick Halston	
2015	Staten Island Summer	Leo Manicucci	
2016	The Eyes	Harry	
2016	Calico Skies	Vincenzo	
2017	Pitching Tents	Tony	
2018	Papa	Frankie Vincent	
2019	Vault	Frank	
2019	Bottom of the 9th	Cosmo	
2021	The Birthday Cake	Vito	
2023	Spinning Gold	Big Joey	
2026	Bad News on the Doorstep	Jerry	Posthumous release

=== Television ===
Year	Title	Role	Notes
1990	H.E.L.P.	Fireman	1 episode
1992-1996	Law & Order	Various characters	4 episodes
1993	The Adventures of Pete & Pete	Vincent Park – Bowling Agent	1 episode
1993	Taking the Heat	Tommy's Man on Courthouse Steps	Television film
1994	New York Undercover	Goon #1	1 episode
1996	Gotti	Angelo Ruggiero	Television film
1997	The Last Don	Danny Fuberta	Miniseries, 1 episode
1997	Dellaventura	Mickey Ezra	1 episode
1998	Witness to the Mob	Mikey De Batt	Television film
1999–2007	The Sopranos	Salvatore "Big Pussy" Bonpensiero	Main cast (seasons 1 & 2), recurring (season 3), guest (seasons 5 & 6)
2000	Bull	Len Rutigliano	2 episodes
2000–02	Son of the Beach	Vinnie Fellachio	3 episodes
2001	For Your Love	Norm	1 episode
2001	Emeril	Himself	1 episode
2002	Ed	Ralph Pazzuti III	1 episode
2002	Grounded for Life	Uncle Sal	1 episode
2003	Queens Supreme	Norm Delgado	Recurring role, 6 episodes
2003	Less than Perfect	Bookie	1 episode
2004	Fillmore!	Mr. Casteneda (voice)	1 episode
2004	The Practice	Lenny Pescatore	3 episodes
2004	Cyberchase	Himself	1 episode
2006	Las Vegas	Jimmy 'The Chin' Aversano	1 episode
2007	Everybody Hates Chris	Paulie	1 episode
2007	Mad TV	Himself	1 episode
2008	General Hospital	Maximus Giambetti	Regular role, 6 episodes
2008–12	Aqua Teen Hunger Force	Terry (voice)	3 episodes, uncredited
2010–12	Pair of Kings	Yamakoshi (voice)	Recurring role, 10 episodes
2013	Blue Bloods	Richie Tomlin	1 episode
2017	Animals	Big Pussy (voice)	2 episodes
2018	Hawaii Five-0	Uncle Vito	2 episodes
2019	Wu-Tang: An American Saga	Fat Larry	Recurring role, 6 episodes
2020	Gordon Ramsay's 24 Hours to Hell and Back	Himself	Episode: "Caneda's White Rooster", as diners, alongside Joseph "Joe" Gannascoli
2021	Gravesend	Donnie 'Glasses' Sisto	Recurring role, 6 episodes
2024	The Curse	Himself	Episode: "Green Queen"
2025	Yellowjackets	Llama (voice)	Episode: "Them's the Brakes"

=== Theatre ===
Year	Title	Role	Venue
2007	Chicago	Amos Hart (replacement)	Ambassador Theatre, Broadway
2014	Bullets Over Broadway	Nick Valenti	St. James Theatre, Broadway

=== Video games ===
Year	Title	Role	Notes
2006	The Sopranos: Road to Respect	Sal "Big Pussy" Bonpensiero (voice)	Video game

=== Music videos ===
Year	Artist	Song	Notes
2001	Dave Matthews Band	"Everyday"	Himself

== Awards and nominations ==
Year	Awards	Category	Recipient	Outcome
2000	Screen Actors Guild Awards	Outstanding Performance by an Ensemble in a Drama Series	The Sopranos	Won
2001	Screen Actors Guild Awards	Outstanding Performance by an Ensemble in a Drama Series	The Sopranos	Nominated
