= Once Upon a Time in Brooklyn =

- Directed by: Paul Borghese
- Written by: Paul Borghese
- Produced by: Paul Borghese, Robyn K. Bennett, William DeMeo
- Starring: William DeMeo; Wass Stevens; Louis Vanaria; Ice-T; Ja Rule; Vincent Pastore; Tony Darrow; Elia Monte-Brown; Samantha Ivers; Cathy Moriarty; Armand Assante
- Cinematography: Chris Walters
- Edited by: Ray Chung
- Music by: Lance McVickar
- Production companies: Grindstone Entertainment Group, Lions Gate Films Home Entertainment
- Distributed by: Grindstone Entertainment Group, Lions Gate Films Home Entertainment
- Release date: May 21, 2013
- Running time: 116 minutes
- Country: United States
- Language: English

Once Upon a Time in Brooklyn is a 2013 American crime film written and directed by Paul Borghese, starring William DeMeo, Wass Stevens, and Louis Vanaria.

== Synopsis ==
Bobby Baldano (William DeMeo) is the black sheep of his family. When he gets out of prison after serving a five-year sentence, his father (Armand Assante) has high hopes he will have a fresh start and come to work at Joseph Baldano & Sons Contracting, the legitimate and thriving multi-generational family business Bobby's grandfather built up from nothing. But Bobby's a mob connected street thug who gets caught back up in a life of inescapable crime. He has two families: one supportive and loving, the other dangerous and deadly. He must decide between his two families and once he does, truths are revealed that Bobby always knew but was too blind to see and too afraid to face.

== Cast ==
- William DeMeo as Bobby Baldano
- Louis Vanaria as Stan "The Jew" Gerzof
- Ice-T as Tyler Moss
- Jeffrey Atkins as Willie Davis
- Vincent Pastore as Luigi Leone
- Tony Darrow as Pasquale "Patsy" Pirati
- Elia Monte-Brown as Rena
- Samantha Ivers as Gina
- Cathy Moriarty as Sarah Baldano
- Armand Assante as Joseph Baldano Sr.
- Charles Parshley as Joseph Baldano Jr.
- William Sweet as FBI Agent Benson
- Robert Costanzo as Lenny Leone
- Wass Stevens as Jimmy Vitigliano
