= Wannabes (film) =

2000 film

Wannabes is a 2000 American crime drama film starring William DeMeo, Conor Dubin, Joe Viterelli and Joseph Donofrio.

== Plot ==
At the beginning of the film, Vinny Minieri (Joseph Donofrio) and his two men are beating a man. It finishes with Vinny burning the man's face with a cigarette. Two brothers, Angelo Argono (William DeMeo) and Paulie Argono (Conor Dubin) are leading a poor and boring life on the streets of Brooklyn, New York City, along with their childhood friends Pete (Daniel Margotta) and Dominic "Dom" (John Palumbo). Brooklyn is owned by mob boss Santo Minieri (Joe Viterelli), an old but ruthless crime boss. The Argono brothers are working in a local restaurant belonging to Mr. Letto (Robert Constanzo) as waiters. Although they can't stand their boss, they are forced to work there.

All changes when Angelo decides to quit his job. He, Paulie, Pete and Dom borrow cash from a loan shark called Hector and start a bookie business, although their Uncle Tommy (Raymond Serra) doesn't like the idea. The business goes well and more and more money goes into Angelo's crew's pockets from losing customers. Because of the success, they are able to sit in a luxury strip club (owned by Minieri) and drink expensive drinks.

Problems appear when Angelo fights Minieri's men and they are thrown out by Vinny and his guys. The crew then starts collecting more and more money, and hotheaded Angelo comes to the idea of racketeering. They set up a protection racket in a candy store, but when they come to collect the cash, they are confronted by Vinny who takes them to his father's home. Santo tells Angelo to give him one good reason not to tell his bodyguard Eddie (John Hoyt) to take him out and beat him to death. Angelo explains that they're just trying to earn money and it would be good if they could work with Santo. Santo takes the offer.

After saving Vinny's life and doing some errands and jobs for Santo, Angelo is now right-hand-man of the crime boss. Vinny doesn't like this and prepares to kill Angelo's gang and his father to be the neighborhood boss. Santo soon has a heart attack and dies, and Vinny understands that it's now a perfect chance to kill the wannabes and become the crime boss. He ambushes Angelo, Pete and Dom (Paulie wasn't there, he was on a date) with his men and kills them in a drive-by shooting.

When Paulie returns, he sees what happened and has a flashback of his childhood, while crying. Suddenly he stops crying and goes to Vinny's house. There he finally kills Vinny and his two bodyguards, saying "And you're the fucking wannabes". The film then ends.

== Characters ==
- "Angelo Argono" - William DeMeo
- "Paulie Argono" - Conor Dubin
- "Santo Minieri" - Joe Viterelli
- "Vinny Minieri" - Joseph D'Onofrio
- "Pete" - Daniel Margotta
- "Dom" - John Palumbo
- "Uncle Tommy" - Raymond Serra
- "Eddie" - John Glenn Hoyt
- "Carmine" - Vinny Vella
- "Pino" - Joseph Carl Dibitetto
- "Mr.Letto" - Robert Constanzo

== Reception ==
In a negative review, Todd Hill of the Staten Island Advance called it "nothing more than another predictable mob picture."
