= State of Grace (1990 film) =

1990 film by Phil Joanou

- Theatrical release poster
- Directed by: Phil Joanou
- Written by: Dennis McIntyre
- Produced by: Ned Dowd; Randy Ostrow; Ron Rotholz
- Starring: Sean Penn; Ed Harris; Gary Oldman; Robin Wright; John Turturro
- Cinematography: Jordan Cronenweth
- Edited by: Claire Simpson
- Music by: Ennio Morricone
- Production company: Cinehaus
- Distributed by: Orion Pictures
- Release date: September 14, 1990
- Running time: 134 minutes
- Country: United States
- Language: English
- Box office: $1.9 million

State of Grace is a 1990 American neo-noir crime drama film directed by Phil Joanou, and starring Sean Penn, Ed Harris, Gary Oldman, Robin Wright, John Turturro, and John C. Reilly. Written by playwright Dennis McIntyre, the film was produced by Ned Dowd, Randy Ostrow, and Ron Rotholz, with a musical score by Ennio Morricone.

Although the film was not a box office success and its release overshadowed by that of the similarly themed Goodfellas, it was received positively by most critics. Shot on location in New York City, the film was inspired by the real-life Hell's Kitchen gang, the Westies.

== Plot ==
Irish-American Terry Noonan returns to Hell's Kitchen in New York City after a long absence, where his unpredictable childhood friend Jackie Flannery is involved in an Irish crime organization run by older brother Frank. Terry rekindles an old relationship with Jackie's sister Kathleen.

Terry is actually an undercover cop, and confesses it to Kathleen. She is reluctant to have anything to do with him after being told by her brother Frank that Terry is now a member of his gang after killing two people, although Terry explains to Kathleen the killing was staged by his police boss Nick, with blanks used.

Jackie is drinking in a bar one night when three members of a rival Italian gang enter. Suspecting their involvement in the killing of his friend, Stevie, Jackie snaps and ends up killing all three for intruding on his gang's territory. Frank is summoned to a meeting with Italian Mafia boss Joe Borelli and is told he must kill his brother Jackie. Frank has told his men to lie in wait in case the meeting goes wrong, and manages to avert a shoot out by hugging the Italian leader outside the restaurant in full view of the gang, causing them to retreat.

Frank arranges for Jackie to collect $25,000 after lying to him that the Italians are actually supporting them and that this is their reward, telling him to go to Battery Park. Terry tags along as Jackie's secret backup, finding that the location has been changed to Pier 84. As they wait at Pier 84, Frank arrives with his enforcer Pat Nicholson just as Terry has stepped away to frantically phone his police handlers to inform them that they have been sent to the wrong location. Frank shoots Jackie in cold blood. The police finally arrive and Terry tells Nick that he is quitting as an undercover operative.

At Jackie's funeral, Terry reveals to Frank that he was at Pier 84, and also hands him his police badge. Hours later, while Kathleen is watching the St. Patrick's Day parade alone, Terry goes to the bar where Frank and his gang are. In a shootout, Frank and all of his men are killed. Having been shot three times, Terry slumps to the floor as the screen fades to black.

== Cast ==
- Sean Penn as Detective Terence “Terry” Noonan
- Ed Harris as Frank "Frankie" Flannery
- Gary Oldman as Jack “Jackie” Flannery
- Robin Wright as Kathleen “Kate” Flannery
- John Turturro as Detective Nick Richardson
- Burgess Meredith as Finn
- R.D. Call as Pat Nicholson
- Joe Viterelli as Joe Borelli
- John C. Reilly as Stevie McGuire
- Deirdre O'Connell as Irene
- Marco St. John as Jimmy Cavello
- Michael P. Moran as Bartender
- Mo Gaffney as Maureen Flannery
- Thomas G. Waites as Ed, Frankie's Goon
- Michael Cumpsty as Ryan, Frankie's Goon
- Mick Cunningham as Frankie's Goon
- Jaime Tirelli as Detective Alvarez
- Vincent Pastore as Borelli's Goon
- James Russo as DeMarco (uncredited)

== Production ==
In February 1989, it was reported that Dennis Hopper had signed on to direct State of Grace under the film's original title Westies. In May of that year, Bill Pullman was cast in the role of Frankie Flannery. Before cameras were set to roll on June 15, both Hopper and Pullman dropped out of the project. Phil Joanou replaced Hopper as director and Ed Harris signed on to replace Pullman as Frankie. On February 1, 1990, the film's screenwriter Dennis McIntyre passed away while the film was still in post-production. In June of that year, Variety noted that Orion Pictures wanted to change the title of the film from Westies to Hell's Kitchen, but Joanou ultimately fought for State of Grace.

== Reception ==
=== Box office ===
The film was released on a limited basis on September 14, 1990. First-week box office totaled $179,927 (14 screens).

According to "The Numbers" web site, the film was in circulation a few weeks and appeared on 335 screens in its widest release. Total receipts were $1,911,542.

Ebert believed the difficulty State of Grace had at the box office was due to another film with the same theme being released the same week, Martin Scorsese's Goodfellas.

=== Critical response ===
State of Grace was generally well received by critics. Of the reviews collected from notable publications by popular review aggregator Rotten Tomatoes, the film holds an overall approval rating of 86% from 28 critics. The consensus summarizes: "State of Grace brings an impressive ensemble cast to bear on its epic gangster saga, elevating a largely familiar story with outstanding performances."

Janet Maslin, film critic for The New York Times, wrote, "Mr. Joanou attempts to capture the sense of place that defines urban crime, and the ethnic and territorial distinctions that give it shape. He is successful much of the time here." Maslin praised Oldman and Harris, writing, "Jackie Flannery is played by the phenomenal Gary Oldman, who since Sid and Nancy has taken on a string of new accents and dramatic identities with stunning ease", and "Jackie's icy older brother ... is played by Ed Harris with an eeriness to match Mr. Oldman's."

Critic Vincent Leo praised Penn's performance, noting, "While Oldman gets the accolades for his energetic performance, it is really Penn's inner demons that provides the film with the right amount of conflict, always letting us be aware that fine lines are the difference between life and death, as well as right and wrong, out in the streets of New York. Is Penn doing the noble thing by taking down the criminals, or is he a rat bastard, disowning himself from the way of life and people who helped him along the way? It's the question that makes him sick to the pit of his stomach, and Penn shows it in his face with almost every scene."

Roger Ebert, film critic of the Chicago Sun-Times, felt the film begins as "original and challenging" but then "turns into a story filled with familiar elements". He nevertheless awarded it three stars out of four and had particular praise for the work of Gary Oldman, writing: "Oldman's performance in the movie is the best thing about it...What's best about State of Grace is what's unique to it - the twisted vision of the Oldman character, who lives in a world of evil and betrayal and has somehow thought himself around to the notion that he is doing the right thing."

State of Grace has been recognized as a cult classic. Actor Leonardo DiCaprio cited Oldman's performance as one of his inspirations, adding that it "influenced an entire generation of actors".

== Soundtrack ==
The original soundtrack was released on October 1, 1990, by MCA. The CD has eighteen tracks, is 53:45 in length, and features a score composed, orchestrated and conducted by Ennio Morricone.
