= Michele Santopietro =

American actress

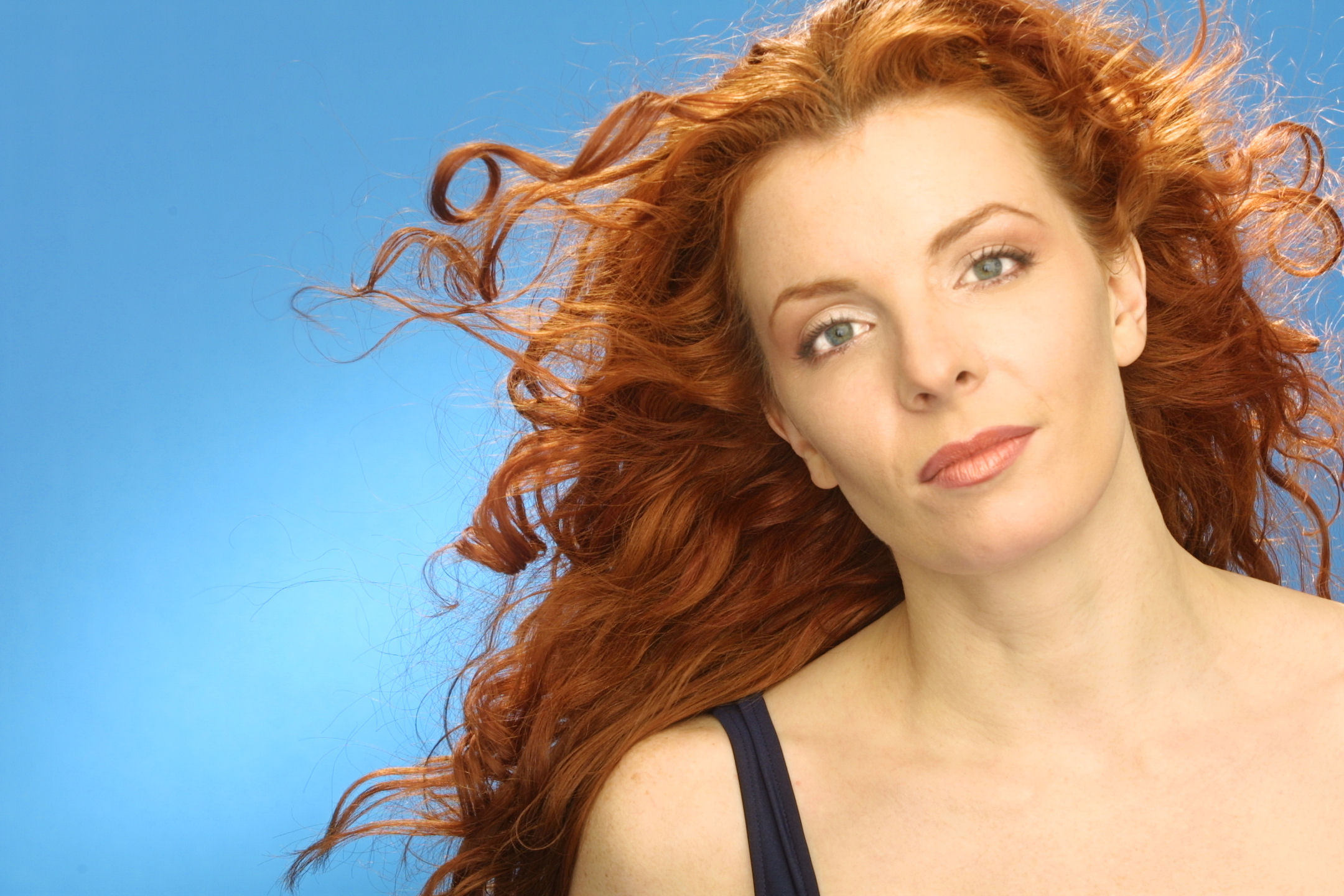
Michele Santopietro

Michele Santopietro is an American actress best known for her recurring character JoJo Palmice on HBO's The Sopranos. Santopietro also made guest and recurring appearances on television shows such as Law & Order, Law & Order SVU, Sex and the City, and the CBS television series New York News.

== Career ==
Santopietro played one of the lead characters, Laura, in the Lionsgate feature film Two Family House with Michael Rispoli and Kelly Macdonald. She also starred opposite Adrian Grenier in the feature film A Perfect Fit, and can be seen opposite Teri Polo and Barry Bostwick in the made-for-television film Love is a Four Letter Word.

She stars in The Donner Party (2009), alongside Crispin Glover, Christian Kane, Mark Boone Junior, and Clayne Crawford. She has also voiced many television and radio commercials, video games, podcasts, audio books, and promotional voice work for Animal Planet and the Lifetime series Prom Queens.

== Filmography ==
=== Film ===
Year	Title	Role	Notes
1996	Dog Run	Stephanie	
1997	Mad City	Young Reporter	
1998	Fiona	Annie	
1999	Final Rinse	Marie	
1999	Advice from a Caterpillar	Young Missy	
2000	Two Family House	Laura	
2001	Biohazardous	Christine	
2002	Penny Ante	Natalia Cadillac	
2002	And She Was	Angie	
2005	A Perfect Fit	Pat Keough	
2005	Jesus, Mary and Joey	Amber	
2007	Mattie Fresno and the Holoflux Universe	Sergeant Spelt	
2009	The Donner Party	Amanda McCutchen	
2017	Sandy Wexler	Mrs. O'Mally	Uncredited
2017	American Violence	Cynthia Shea	

=== Television ===
Year	Title	Role	Notes
1993	Late Night with Conan O'Brien	Oldie's Girl / Turkey Babe	2 episodes
1994	Rolonda	Anna	Episode: "Date"
1995	One Life to Live	Jody	Episode #1.6905
1995	Clarissa	Lindy	Television film
1995	New York News	Sear	3 episodes
1998	Exiled: A Law & Order Movie	The gorgeous redhead	Television film
1998	Port Charles	Detective Rebecca McCann	4 episodes
1999	As the World Turns	Goldie	5 episodes
1999–2002	The Sopranos	JoJo Palmice	4 episodes
2000, 2004	Law & Order	Lisa Turro / Karen Rachman	2 episodes
2001	That's My Baby	Narrator	Episode #1.4
2001	The Crocodile Hunter	Narrator	Episode: "Ten Deadliest Snakes in the World"
2003	Sex and the City	Nicole	Episode: "The Post-It Always Sticks Twice"
2003, 2005	Law & Order: Special Victims Unit	Linda Cusick / Mandy	2 episodes
2005–2009	Animal Cops	Narrator	10 episodes
2007	Love Is a Four Letter Word	Betsy Showalter	Television film
2009	Jimmy Kimmel Live!	Various roles	2 episodes
2009	Monday First	Ema	Television film
2010	Days of Our Lives	Tina	2 episodes
2012	Holliston	Sparkle	2 episodes
2012–2013	Prom Queens	The Comedian	6 episodes
2016	American Horror Story: Roanoke	Sultry Woman	Episode: "Chapter 6"
