= Serving Sara =

2002 film by Reginald Hudlin

- Theatrical release poster
- Directed by: Reginald Hudlin
- Written by: Jay Scherick; David Ronn
- Produced by: Dan Halsted
- Starring: Matthew Perry; Elizabeth Hurley; Bruce Campbell; Amy Adams; Vincent Pastore; Cedric the Entertainer
- Cinematography: Robert Brinkmann
- Edited by: Jim Miller
- Music by: Marcus Miller
- Production company: Mandalay Pictures
- Distributed by: Paramount Pictures (United States and Canada); Summit Entertainment (international)
- Release date: August 23, 2002
- Running time: 102 minutes
- Country: United States
- Language: English
- Budget: $29 million
- Box office: $20.1 million

Serving Sara is a 2002 American romantic comedy film directed by Reginald Hudlin and starring Matthew Perry, Elizabeth Hurley, and Bruce Campbell. The story follows a process server given the assignment to serve a British socialite with divorce papers, but is persuaded to serve her husband instead so that she can get a larger portion of his money in the divorce. The film was panned by critics and did poorly at the box office, debuting in the top 10 when it was released on August 23, 2002, in the US, where it grossed only $5,750,000 on the weekend.

== Plot ==
Joe Tyler, a process server, is a week late serving a Mafia kingpin known as Fat Charlie with a summons to appear as a witness in court. Joe's abrasive boss Ray ridicules him while complimenting Joe's rival, Tony, for serving multiple summonses in record time. Willing to give Joe one last shot, Ray gives him an assignment to serve British socialite Sara Moore with divorce papers from her husband, Gordon, who is at his ranch in Texas with his mistress, Kate, while Sara is vacationing in upstate New York.

While Joe is attempting to serve Sara, Tony tips her off, thus revealing that Joe has been failing lately because Tony is sabotaging his efforts. Eventually Joe does serve her, but is mugged soon thereafter. Joe and Sara are forced to take the same bus; while they are riding together, Joe informs her that, under Texas law, she stands to gain nothing from the divorce. When she learns that "half of everything" would apply if the papers had been served under New York law, Sara offers Joe a million dollars to serve her husband and rip up her papers. Despite knowing that he might lose his job, Joe agrees and the two set off together to serve Gordon.

When Ray hears of their plan, he informs Gordon and sends Tony off to re-serve Sara. Gordon hires a bodyguard named Vernon to protect himself, and Joe, expecting Tony to tail him, leaves a set of bogus clues that lead Tony to Miami, Florida, Bangor, Maine, and then Amarillo, Texas, where Tony is shot in the back as he attempts to get on the grounds of the wrong ranch to try to serve the papers. Sara and Joe trail Gordon to his ranch, but Gordon evades them. At the ranch, Sara takes some money and Gordon's passport so that he cannot leave the country. Sara and Joe stay overnight at a hotel, and Joe tells Sara of his dream of owning a vineyard. While Sara is bathing, Joe goes to the bar, and Gordon's mistress appears to suggest a new deal to Joe; for one million dollars from the divorce settlement, she will reveal Gordon's location. Joe agrees, but the entire deal is a setup to get Tony into the hotel room to serve Sara, which he does. Furious, Sara kicks Joe out.

While Joe contemplates his lost fortune and budding affection for Sara, he notices Tony's watch in the picture Tony took of him serving Sara, and calls Ray to inform him that Tony forgot to set his watch to Central Time Zone, so that the papers do not take effect until 7:04 pm Central Time. With mere minutes until they both lose a fortune, Joe and Sara trail Gordon to a monster truck rally. They chase Gordon and evade both Vernon and Tony, and with seconds to spare, Sara knocks Gordon down by dropping a six-pack of beer on his head. Joe serves him under New York law and Gordon receives the papers. Tony and Vernon are carried out of the stadium on stretchers (due to Tony accidentally running over Vernon) and then attempt to fight one another. The final scene shows Joe and Sara at Joe's vineyard, where they taste-test a bottle of Joe's first vintage before going inside to have sex.

== Cast ==
- Matthew Perry as Joe Tyler
- Elizabeth Hurley as Sara Moore
- Bruce Campbell as Gordon Moore
- Vincent Pastore as Tony
- Cedric the Entertainer as Ray Harris
- Amy Adams as Kate
- Terry Crews as Vernon
- Jerry Stiller as Milton the Cop
- Marshall Bell as Warren Cebron
- Joe Viterelli as Fat Charlie

== Production ==
Matthew Perry was struggling with drug and alcohol addiction during the production. He was working on the show Friends and filming Serving Sara at the same time. In his autobiography, Perry was apologetic for his acting in this film and candid about his daily use of Xanax and Methadone, while also ingesting a quart of vodka each day; Perry, too, admitted he re-recorded some of his scenes after he became sober, although filming was delayed for two months while Perry went to rehab.

== Reception ==
=== Critical response ===
Serving Sara was panned by critics. Metacritic, which uses a weighted average, assigned the film a score of 18 out of 100, based on 26 critics, indicating "overwhelming dislike". On the review aggregator website Rotten Tomatoes, 4% of 113 critics' reviews are positive, with an average rating of 3.2/10. The website's consensus reads: "A romantic comedy that's neither funny nor particularly romantic, Serving Sara is a forgettable time waster." It was ranked number 82 in a Rotten Tomatoes editorial on the 100 worst movies of all time. Audiences surveyed by CinemaScore gave the film a grade of "C+" on scale of A to F.

Cynthia Fuchs from PopMatters found the progression of the plot "increasingly incoherent, a string of rehashed sight gags based in insipid vulgarity." Entertainment Weekly's Lisa Schwarzbaum described the film's humor as being "a cattle ranch full of joke droppings and mooing shtick not worth stepping in." Scott Tobias of The A.V. Club said about the film, "[A] third-rate conflation of Midnight Run and It Happened One Night, Serving Sara relies heavily on Perry's perpetually exasperated shtick, which fits more comfortably among the democratic ensemble of TV's Friends." Manohla Dargis of the Los Angeles Times called it, "One of the more cynical and insulting Hollywood offerings in recent memory," saying that, "Unfunny and lacking any sense of commitment to or affection for its characters, the Reginald Hudlin comedy relies on toilet humor, ethnic slurs." In a review for The New York Times, Stephen Holden criticized the film for utilizing a similar cattle gag scene from the Farrelly brothers comedy Say It Isn't So to grab laughs from the audience, saying that "Some jokes, apparently, are just so uproarious they have to be recycled." He also gave note of the performances of Perry and Hurley, finding the latter coming out unscathed but feeling the former having performed poorly because "his blocky, charmless screen presence and attitude of blustery impatience make the movie sometimes hard to watch."

=== Box office ===
The film opened at #6 at the U.S. box office and earned $5.7 million in its opening weekend. The film had a budget of $29 million and the film's total gross in the United States was $16.9 million. The film grossed a further $3,215,965 at the international box office.
