= Analyze This =

1999 film by Harold Ramis

- Theatrical release poster
- Directed by: Harold Ramis
- Screenplay by: Kenneth Lonergan; Peter Tolan; Harold Ramis
- Story by: Kenneth Lonergan; Peter Tolan
- Produced by: Paula Weinstein; Jane Rosenthal
- Starring: Robert De Niro; Billy Crystal; Lisa Kudrow; Joe Viterelli; Chazz Palminteri
- Cinematography: Stuart Dryburgh
- Edited by: Craig P. Herring; Christopher Tellefsen
- Music by: Howard Shore
- Production companies: Village Roadshow Pictures; NPV Entertainment; Baltimore Spring Creek Pictures; Face Productions; TriBeCa Productions
- Distributed by: Warner Bros. (Worldwide); Roadshow Entertainment (Australia)
- Release date: March 5, 1999
- Running time: 103 minutes
- Countries: United States; Australia
- Language: English
- Budget: $30 million
- Box office: $176.9 million

Analyze This is a 1999 American crime comedy film directed by Harold Ramis, who co-wrote the screenplay with playwrights Kenneth Lonergan and Peter Tolan. It follows a crisis-stricken mafioso (Robert De Niro) who solicits the assistance of a reluctant psychiatrist (Billy Crystal).

The film was given a wide release by Warner Bros. and Roadshow Entertainment on March 5, 1999, grossing $176.9 million worldwide, and received positive reviews. Due to its success, it was followed by the sequel Analyze That in 2002.

== Plot ==
Mob boss Paul Vitti and his consigliere Dominic Manetta are discussing an upcoming meeting and the Mafia's present-day problems over lunch. As Manetta warns Paul to look out for Primo Sindone (an up-and-coming mafioso who wants to be capo di tutti capi), gunmen bypass and kill Manetta.

Psychiatrist Ben Sobel is disillusioned with his life: his son from his first marriage spies on his sessions, his patients have been boring him, and his wedding to Laura MacNamara is nearing. Distracted, Ben accidentally rear-ends a car belonging to Paul. Jelly, one of Vitti's men, takes the blame, but Ben gives Jelly his business card in case he decides to contact him regarding damages.

During a meeting, Paul has a panic attack and tells Jelly that he needs to see a psychiatrist, but it has to be kept a secret. Jelly recommends Ben. Paul visits Ben, claiming that his friend needs therapy, but Ben deduces his lie. As he realizes that Paul is talking about himself, it impresses Paul enough to want to see him permanently, to Ben's chagrin. Ben flies to Miami for his wedding with Laura, but Paul, Jelly and the crew follow him. Paul explains that he has been suffering from erectile dysfunction, and Ben suggests that the source of the problem might be stress.

The next day, Paul has another panic attack and demands to see Ben. Paul explains his history with his father, so Ben thinks that this might have something to do with Paul's anxiety. The wedding is interrupted when an assassin is killed by Jelly. Ben confronts Paul, causing him to lose his temper. Ben suggests that he resolve his anger by calling Primo and telling him how he feels. Paul phones Primo and threatens to kill him if he makes another attempt on Paul's life.

Ben and his family return to their home in New York, where they discover a fountain in their garden, a gift from Paul. The FBI arrives and requests that Ben inform on Paul, but he refuses despite the FBI's threats. He changes his mind when the FBI plays a tape on which Paul reveals his intention to kill Ben after the meeting (which the FBI had doctored: Paul actually said that he would kill anyone who harmed Ben).

At his next meeting with Paul, Ben wears a wire but discards it when he learns that, as a child, Paul witnessed his father being murdered. Paul, informed that Ben is working with the FBI, takes him to a secluded place to kill him. They get into a heated argument, but Paul begins sobbing as he admits that he blames himself for his father's death. Two hitmen arrive to kill Paul, but Jelly kills them both. Paul apologizes for planning to kill Ben, and the two go their separate ways.

On the day of the meeting, Paul has a severe emotional breakdown. Jelly interrupts Ben's wedding, requesting that Ben attend the meeting as Paul's consigliere. Ben is nervous at first, but eventually grows into his role and ends up offending Primo so much that he pulls a gun on Ben. Paul arrives, orders Primo to stand down, and announces that he knows that a close member of the family, Carlo Mangano, killed Dominic, but he will not seek revenge because he has decided to retire from the Mafia. Outside, a shootout ensues between Paul's and Primo's men, during which Ben sacrifices himself for Paul. The FBI intervenes, the mobsters are arrested, and Ben is taken to the hospital.

Ben visits Paul in prison, and Paul thanks Ben for his help before informing him that Primo is dead. At home, Ben dances with his new wife as Tony Bennett serenades them.

== Cast ==
- Robert De Niro as Paul Vitti
- Billy Crystal as Dr. Ben Sobel
- Lisa Kudrow as Laura MacNamara Sobel
- Chazz Palminteri as Primo Sindone
- Joe Viterelli as Jelly
- Bill Macy as Dr. Isaac Sobel
- Leo Rossi as Carlo Mangano
- Kyle Sabihy as Michael Sobel
- Rebecca Schull as Dorothy Sobel
- Molly Shannon as Caroline
- Max Casella as Nicky Shivers
- Pat Cooper as Salvatore Masiello
- Richard C. Castellano as Jimmy Boots
- Joseph Rigano as Manetta
- Aasif Mandvi as Dr. Shulman
- Tony Darrow as Moony
- Ira Wheeler as Scott MacNamara
- Elizabeth Bracco as Marie Vitti

== Production ==
=== Development ===
Analyze This was co-produced and co-financed by the American Warner Bros. Pictures and the Australian Roadshow Entertainment.

== Reception ==
=== Box office ===
Analyze This opened in 2,518 theaters and earned an average of $7,017 per location, for an estimated $18 million opening, putting it at number 1 at the box office for that weekend ahead of 8mm and Cruel Intentions; it exceeded the $13 million debut of Billy Crystal's City Slickers in 1991. It would achieve the highest opening weekend for a Robert De Niro film. That record would be held until the release of Meet the Parents in October 2000. The opening weekend audience skewed older, with 75% over the age of 25, and audience demographics being 54% female to 46% male. Overall, Analyze This spent two weeks at the top of the box office until Forces of Nature beat it in its third weekend. In the United Kingdom, the film ranked second behind The Haunting with $1.2 million during its opening weekend. The film went on to earn $107 million at the domestic box office and a further $70 million at the international box office, for a worldwide total of $177 million.

=== Critical response ===
On the review aggregator website Rotten Tomatoes, 69% of 106 critics' reviews are positive, with an average rating of 6.5/10. The website's consensus reads: "Analyze This is a satisfying comedy with great performances by De Niro and Crystal." Metacritic, which uses a weighted average, assigned the film a score of 60 out of 100, based on 30 critics, indicating "mixed or average" reviews. Audiences polled by CinemaScore gave the film a grade of "A–" on a scale of A+ to F.

Roger Ebert of the Chicago Sun-Times gave the film three stars out of four, saying that the film would be thought of in terms of the two leads, but also praised Joe Viterelli for his subtle performance that holds the film together.

Variety's review highlighted the film as a "sometimes funny situation comedy in which the mechanics of the situation eventually overwhelm the comedy".

In his review for The Hollywood Reporter, David Hunter stated that "Analyze This has multiple personalities and hits the audience with a few fresh jokes but far too many 1970s mafia movie cliches", and found the performances in the film lacking, with both De Niro and Crystal not fully realizing the comic potential of the premise and certain moments falling short of authenticity.

Geoff Andrew of Time Out described the comedy as "heavy" and the use of the actors as "lazy and cliched".

Analyze This drew several comparisons by journalists to the mafia show The Sopranos, which had premiered two months earlier, due to its plot about mobster Tony Soprano seeing a psychiatrist after suffering a panic attack. The film is also mentioned in The Sopranos episode "Guy Walks into a Psychiatrist's Office...".
