= Biohazardous =

2001 film by Michael J. Hein

- Film poster
- Directed by: Michael J. Hein
- Written by: Michael J. Hein
- Produced by: Howard Hein
- Starring: Sprague Grayden; David Garver; Al Thompson; Thomas A. Cahill; Will Dunham
- Cinematography: Bud Gardner
- Edited by: Jim Boyd
- Production company: MooDude Productions
- Release date: 2001
- Running time: 95 minutes
- Country: United States
- Language: English

Biohazardous is a 2001 American horror film written and directed by Michael J. Hein. It stars Sprague Grayden as a teenager who discovers that a local research company has been creating zombies.

== Plot ==
A research company founded by ex-Nazi scientists moves to a small town. Bored, several teens break in and find that the company has been reanimating the dead. Stuck there with the zombies, they attempt to escape with the help of a few cops and employees who are also present.

== Cast ==
- Sprague Grayden as Laura Forman
- David Garver as Steve
- Al Thompson as Mike Walker
- Jon Avner Sgt. Murdock
- Will Dunham as Father Morris
- Matt Markey as Joe
- Katheryn Winnick as Jennifer
- Gary Ray as Hank Forman
- Michele Santopietro as Christine
- Thomas A. Cahill as Mr. Stine

== Production ==
Filming took place in Hillsdale, New Jersey. The budget was less than $100,000.

== Release ==
Biohazardous was released on DVD in the United States on February 18, 2003.

== Reception and legacy ==
Drive-in film critic Joe Bob Briggs called it "a pretty much by-the-numbers, micro-budget effort". Jerry White of Beyond Hollywood wrote that the film is enjoyably bad, as many scenes are unintentionally funny. Daniel Benson of HorrorTalk rated it 2/5 stars and wrote that the film's special effects can not overcome the other faults, including poor writing and acting. Writing in The Zombie Movie Encyclopedia, academic Peter Dendle said, "The filmmakers exploit the limited location as best they can" but "there's little build-up of tension".

As an outgrowth of Biohazardous, Hein founded the New York City Horror Film Festival.
