= Pat Cooper =

American actor and comedian (1929–2023)

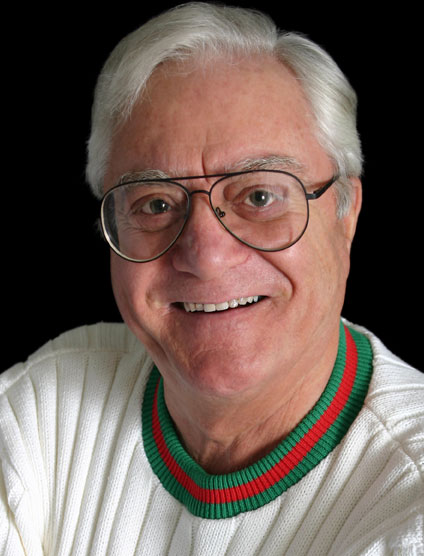
- Born: Pasquale Vito Caputo; July 31, 1929; New York City, U.S.
- Died: June 6, 2023 (aged 93); Las Vegas, Nevada, U.S.
- Occupations: Actor; comedian
- Years active: 1953–2013
- Spouses: Dolores DePaci (m. 1952; divorced); Patti Prince (m. 1963; died 2005) Emily Conner (m. 2018)
- Children: 3 (Note: 2 biological children and 1 adopted)

Pat Cooper (born Pasquale Vito Caputo; July 31, 1929 – June 6, 2023) was an American actor and comedian whose career began in the 1950s. He experienced a late career resurgence from appearances on The Howard Stern Show, Imus in the Morning, and Opie and Anthony. He also played Masiello in the film Analyze This (1999) and its sequel Analyze That (2002). Known for his short temper, he was nicknamed the "Comedian of Outrage".

== Life and career ==
Pat Cooper was born Pasquale Vito Caputo on July 31, 1929, in Coney Island, Brooklyn and grew up in the nearby neighborhoods of Midwood and Red Hook. His father Michele Caputo was a bricklayer from Mola di Bari, Italy and his mother, Louise Gargiulo, was born in Brooklyn. Cooper often made reference to his Italian heritage in his stand up comedy.

He was drafted into the Army in 1952 and was stationed at Fort Jackson, South Carolina. He was discharged with hammer toe, the result of wearing shoes that were too small as a child.

Cooper started performing in the 1950s. His big break came in 1963 on The Jackie Gleason Show. Afterward, he played top nightclubs such as the Copacabana and Sands Hotel and Casino, opening for major entertainers such as Frank Sinatra, Bobby Darin, Tony Bennett, Jerry Lewis, Sammy Davis Jr., Ella Fitzgerald, and Liza Minnelli.

In the early 1960s he Americanized his name to Pat Cooper.

Billboard gave his album Our Hero (1965) a special merit review and said that it "does for the Italian-American community what Jackie Mason did for the Jewish-American community." In 1966, he was pictured sitting on a chair covered in spaghetti and pasta sauce for Spaghetti Sauce and Other Delights (a parody of the Herb Alpert's Tijuana Brass album, Whipped Cream & Other Delights, in which a woman is sitting on a chair covered in whipped cream), an album that consists of one side of spoken comedy and one side of parody songs; Billboard described it as stronger than Our Hero.

In May 1969, Cooper and singer Jimmy Roselli premiered in their two-man show at Broadway's Palace theater in New York City. During the 1970s, Cooper was a frequent guest on The Mike Douglas Show and also appeared on The Merv Griffin Show and The Dean Martin Show. Cooper made an appearance on Tom Snyder's Tomorrow Coast To Coast show on March 6, 1981, in which he decried "headliners" in the club circuit who often worked with comics as their second act.

He performed at many celebrity roasts at the New York Friars Club; he was in an episode of Seinfeld titled "The Friar's Club". He was also a frequent guest on many radio shows, most notably The Howard Stern Show.

Cooper played fictional mobster Salvatore Masiello in the film Analyze This and in the sequel Analyze That; he played lawyer John Bruno in the 2003 film This Thing of Ours. He also guest-starred on television series such as Vega$, Charlie's Angels, It's a Living, and L.A. Law.

Cooper was an occasional contributor to Colin Quinn's late-night show on Comedy Central, Tough Crowd with Colin Quinn. In 2005, he released a DVD called You're Always Yelling and in 2010, he wrote his autobiography entitled How Dare You Say How Dare Me!

== Personal life and death ==
Cooper was married three times. He has two biological children (Michael and Louise Caputo) from his first marriage to Dolores Nola and one adopted daughter (Patti Jo Cooper) from his second marriage to singer Patti Prince. Cooper also has two grandsons and three granddaughters. In 2018, he married his third wife, Emily Conner, who he met in 2010 at the New York Friars Club. She is a producer and the daughter of Diane Decker, one of the original Serendipity Singers.

Cooper lived in New York then moved back to Las Vegas, Nevada, after retiring. He publicly feuded with his children on his radio appearances and was estranged from all members of his biological family. He died at his Las Vegas home on June 6, 2023, at the age of 93.

== Filmography ==
=== Films ===
Year	Title	Role	Notes
1981	Uncle Scam	Agency Chief	
1982	Fighting Back	Harry Janelli	
1997	Silent Prew	Bartender	
1998	Code of Ethics	Mr. DeAngelo	
1999	Analyze This	Salvatore Masiello	
2000	The Boys Behind the Desk		
2001	Ankle Bracelet	Milt Epstein	
2002	Analyze That	Salvatore Masiello	
2003	This Thing of Ours	John Bruno	

=== Television ===
Year	Title	Role	Notes
1980	Vega$	Al Greely	Episode: "Deadly Blessings"
1981	Charlie's Angels	Jonathan Tobias	Episode: "Stuntwomen Angels"
1981-82	It's a Living	Harry; Clerk	2 episodes
1993	L.A. Law	Herb Moffit	Episode: "Foreign Co-respondent"
1996	Seinfeld	Himself	Episode: "The Friar's Club"

== Discography ==
=== Studio albums ===
Year	Album	Peak positions	
Year	Album	US 200	US CB
1965	Our Hero...	82	62
1966	Spaghetti Sauce & Other Delights	84	97
1967	You Don't Have To Be Italian To Like Pat Cooper	—	—
1969	More Saucy Stories	193	—
1981	The Best of Pat Cooper	—	—

=== Singles ===
- The More Your Make The More Your Spend (1965)
- Pepperoni Kid (1966)
- You Don't Have To Be Italian / Conchetta (1967)
- More Saucy Stories (1968)
- Its The Italian In Me (1970)
