= Coffee and Cigarettes =

2003 anthology film directed by Jim Jarmusch

- Film poster
- Directed by: Jim Jarmusch
- Written by: Jim Jarmusch
- Produced by: Jason Kliot; Rudd Simmons; Jim Stark; Cassis Birgit Staudt; Joana Vicente
- Starring: Roberto Benigni; Steven Wright; Joie Lee; Cinqué Lee; Steve Buscemi; Iggy Pop; Tom Waits; Joseph Rigano; Vinny Vella; Vinny Vella Jr.; Renée French; E.J. Rodriguez; Alex Descas; Isaach de Bankolé; Cate Blanchett; Meg White; Jack White; Alfred Molina; Steve Coogan; GZA; RZA; Bill Murray; William Rice; Taylor Mead
- Cinematography: Frederick Elmes; Ellen Kuras; Robby Müller; Tom Dicillo
- Edited by: Jay Rabinowitz; Melody London; Terry Katz; Jim Jarmusch
- Production companies: United Artists; Smokescreen; Asmik Ace; BIM Distribuzione
- Distributed by: MGM Distribution Co. (United States); Asmik Ace (Japan); Bim Distribuzione (Italy)
- Release dates: September 5, 2003 (Venice); May 14, 2004 (United States)
- Running time: 96 minutes
- Countries: United States; Japan; Italy
- Languages: English; French
- Box office: $7.9 million

Coffee and Cigarettes is a 2003 independent anthology film written and directed by Jim Jarmusch. The film consists of eleven standalone scenes. Themes are often comedic and depressed, and share coffee and cigarettes as a common thread.

== Themes ==
The film is composed of a comic series of short vignettes shot in black and white built on one another to create a cumulative effect, as the characters discuss things such as caffeine popsicles, Paris in the 1920s, and the use of nicotine as an insecticide – all while sitting around drinking coffee and smoking cigarettes. The theme of the film is absorption in the obsessions, joys, and addictions of life, and there are many common threads between vignettes, such as the Tesla coil, medical knowledge, the suggestion that coffee and cigarettes don't make for a healthy meal (generally lunch), cousins, The Lees (Cinqué and Joie, and a mention of Spike Lee), delirium, miscommunication, musicians, the similarities between musicianship and medical skill, industrial music, acknowledged fame, and the idea of drinking coffee before sleeping in order to have fast dreams. In each of the segments of the film, the common motif of alternating black and white tiles can be seen in some fashion. The visual use of black and white relates to the theme of interpersonal contrasts, as each vignette features two people who disagree completely yet manage to sit amicably at the same table.

== Plot segments ==
=== Strange to Meet You ===
This is the original 1986 short Coffee and Cigarettes with Roberto Benigni and Steven Wright having a conversation about coffee and cigarettes. Steven tells Roberto about his coffee ideas, such as freezing it into "caffeine Popsicles" for kids, and how he likes to drink coffee right before he goes to sleep so he can dream faster "like a camera on those Indy 500 cars". Roberto does not understand anything he says but is entertained to listen. They experiment with switching chairs, but decide to switch back again. Steven suddenly remembers he has a dentist appointment that he is afraid to go to, but has to. Roberto happily volunteers and goes instead of him.

=== Twins ===
Originally the 1989 short Coffee and Cigarettes, Memphis Version (aka Coffee and Cigarettes II) segment featured Joie Lee and Cinqué Lee as the titular twins and Steve Buscemi as Danny the barman who expounds on his theory on Elvis Presley's evil twin. The scene also features a recounting of the urban legend that Elvis Presley made racist comments about African Americans during a magazine interview.

Cinqué Lee also appears in "Jack Shows Meg his Tesla Coil" later in the film.

=== Somewhere in California ===
Filmed in 1993 as the short titled Coffee and Cigarettes – Somewhere in California (also known as Coffee and Cigarettes III) it won the Short Film Palme d'Or at the Cannes Film Festival. In this segment, musicians Iggy Pop and Tom Waits smoke cigarettes to celebrate that they quit smoking, drink some coffee and make awkward conversation. At various points each musician remarks that the other is not on the jukebox, though Iggy Pop's music can be heard on a jukebox in another segment later in the film.

=== Those Things'll Kill Ya ===
Joseph Rigano and Vinny Vella have a conversation over coffee about the dangers of smoking. The silent Vinny Vella Jr. also appears to beg his father for money, which is given in exchange for affection, which is not provided.

=== Renée ===
Renée French (played by herself) drinks coffee while looking through a gun magazine. E. J. Rodríguez plays the waiter, who is eager to be of service. He initially approaches her to serve more coffee, to which she reacts by saying "I had the right color, right temperature, it was just right". After that, he comes back several times, hesitates, and leaves. He seems intent on striking up a conversation with her.

=== No Problem ===
Alex Descas and Isaach De Bankolé are a couple of friends who meet and talk over some coffee and cigarettes. Alex has no problems, or so he answers to Isaach's repeated questioning. At the end of the scene, Alex takes out a pair of dice and rolls three sets of doubles. It could be assumed that he has a gambling problem but to him it appears to be a non-issue. Despite this, he doesn't roll the dice in front of his friend.

=== Cousins ===
Cate Blanchett plays herself and a fictional and non-famous cousin named Shelly, whom she meets over some coffee in the lounge of a hotel. There is no smoking in the lounge, as the waiter informs Shelly (but not until Cate is gone). Shelly tells Cate about her boyfriend, Lee, who is in a band. She describes the music style as hard industrial, similar to the band Iggy describes. Cate tells Shelly she looks forward to meeting "Lou" someday. Cate is made to feel awkward and uncomfortable by Shelly's constant envious remarks about how she perceives Cate's life and attitude.

=== Jack Shows Meg His Tesla Coil ===
This short features Jack and Meg White of the band the White Stripes having some coffee and cigarettes. They play themselves, although the scene seems to perpetuate the band's former pretense that they are indeed siblings. Jack shows Meg his Tesla coil that he says he built himself and waxes intellectual on the achievements of Nikola Tesla. In the beginning, Jack seems upset that Meg doesn't share his excitement, and it takes Meg some coaxing to get Jack to agree to show Meg his Tesla coil. He introduces the line, "Nikola Tesla perceived the earth to be a conductor of acoustical resonance." Cinqué Lee plays a waiter in this segment. In the end, the coil breaks, and Meg and the Waiter offer suggestions as to why it might be broken. Finally Meg says something that Jack seems to agree to, and he leaves to "go home and check it out". Meg clinks her coffee cup to produce a ringing noise, pauses, says "Earth as a conductor of acoustical resonance" and clinks her coffee cup to produce the noise again; she looks pensively out into the distance before a cut to black. Early during the segment, "Down on the Street" by Iggy Pop's band the Stooges is played on the jukebox in the background.

=== Cousins? ===
British actors Alfred Molina and Steve Coogan have a conversation over some tea. (Coogan offers Molina a French cigarette, but Molina saves his for later.) Molina is a very enthusiastic fan of Coogan's, who contrarily is very uninterested at their meeting and barely manages to hide this. Molina excitedly shares with him research he came across, learning that they are distant cousins, and proposes a friendship or show business project to capitalize on this. Steve Coogan still remains evasive, lightening up only when an attractive female fan recognizes him. He later tries to make up excuses to keep from ever having to hear from Alfred Molina again, and then clumsily tries to reverse this when he overhears Molina get a call from good friend Spike Jonze. But it is too late and Molina, disappointed, leaves Coogan with the bill. Although the scene is set in LA, the segment was actually shot in Brooklyn at Galapagos, Williamsburg.

=== Delirium ===
Hip-hop artists (and cousins) GZA and RZA of the Wu-Tang Clan drink naturally caffeine-free herbal tea and have a conversation with the waiter, Bill Murray, about the dangers of caffeine and nicotine. During this conversation, GZA makes a reference to how he would drink much coffee before going to bed so his dreams would "whip by" similar to the camera-shots at the Indy 500, very similar to the same reference that Steven Wright did in the first segment. Murray requests that GZA and RZA keep his identity secret, while GZA and RZA inform Murray about nontraditional methods to relieve his smoker's hack.

=== Champagne ===
William "Bill" Rice and Taylor Mead spend their coffee break having a nostalgic conversation, while Janet Baker singing "Ich bin der Welt abhanden gekommen" from Mahler's Rückert-Lieder appears from nowhere. William Rice repeats Jack White's line, "Nikola Tesla perceived the earth as a conductor of acoustical resonance." It is possible to interpret the relevance of this line to the constant recurrent themes throughout the seemingly unconnected segments.

== Reception ==
On the review aggregator website Rotten Tomatoes, the film has a 63% approval rating based on 122 reviews, and an average rating of 6.1/10. The site's critical consensus states: "Episodes vary in quality, but overall this talky film is quirkily engaging." On Metacritic, the film has a weighted average score of 65 out of 100, based on 35 critics, indicating "generally favorable reviews".

Several reviewers praised the film's handling of the relationship between celebrities and fame. William Thomas of Empire delighted in the "quirky conversations" and "almost nostalgic air", but felt the film suffered from an occasional lack of focus and an uneven structure. Roger Ebert commended the film's tempo, writing that "none of these 11 vignettes overstays its welcome, although a few seem to lose their way". Philip French of The Guardian criticized several segments, but praised the three in which "people appear as versions of themselves ... Iggy Pop meeting Tom Waits; Cate Blanchett (in both roles) having a reunion with an envious cousin; Alfred Molina taking tea with Steve Coogan in Hollywood".

=== Accolades ===
Award	Date	Category	Recipient(s)	Result	Ref.
Jeonju International Film Festival	May 2, 2004	Audience Award	Coffee and Cigarettes	Won	
Los Angeles Film Critics Association	December 11, 2004	Best Supporting Actress	Cate Blanchett (also for The Aviator)	Runner-up	
National Society of Film Critics	January 9, 2005	Best Supporting Actress	Cate Blanchett (also for The Aviator)	Runner-up	
Vancouver Film Critics Circle	February 20, 2005	Best Supporting Actress	Cate Blanchett (also for The Aviator)	Nominated	
Independent Spirit Awards	February 26, 2005	Best Supporting Female	Cate Blanchett	Nominated	
Chlotrudis Society for Independent Film	March 20, 2005	Best Supporting Actress	Cate Blanchett	Nominated	
Chlotrudis Society for Independent Film	March 20, 2005	Best Supporting Actor	Alfred Molina	Nominated	
Chlotrudis Society for Independent Film	March 20, 2005	Best Cast	Coffee and Cigarettes	Nominated	
Russian National Movie Awards	2005	Best Independent Movie	Coffee and Cigarettes	Nominated	
Sun in a Net Awards	2006	Best Foreign Language Film	Coffee and Cigarettes	Nominated	

== Soundtrack ==
- Louie Louie - Written by Richard Berry - Performed by Richard Berry & The Pharaohs
- Saw Sage - Written by Tom Waits / Ron Waters / D. Devore / Tom Nunn / B. Hopkin - Performed by C-SIDE / Tom Waits
- Serenade to Nalani - Written & Performed by Jerry Byrd
- Lonesome Road - Written by Doug Wood
- Ich Bin der Welt Abhanden Gekommen (I Have Lost Track of the World) - Composed by Gustav Mahler - Lyrics by Friedrich Rückert - Performed by Janet Baker and The New Philharmonia Orchestra
- Paauau Waltz - Written by John U. Iosepa - Performed by Jerry Byrd
- Hanalei Moon - Written by Bob Nelson - Performed by Jerry Byrd
- Baden-Baden - Written by Milt Jackson and Ray Brown (as Raymond M. Brown) - Performed by Modern Jazz Quartet
- Crimson and Clover - Written by Tommy James and Peter P. Lucia Jr. - Performed by Tommy James & The Shondells
- Down on the Street - Written by Iggy Pop / Ron Asheton / Scott Asheton / David Alexander - Performed by The Stooges
- Nimblefoot Ska - Written by Coxsone Dodd - Performed by The Skatalites
- Set Back (Just Cool) - Written by Coxsone Dodd - Performed by Roland Alphonso and Carol McLaughlin
- Streets of Gold - Written by Coxsone Dodd - Performed by Roland Alphonso and the Soul Vendors
- Enna Bella - Written by Eric Morris, Coxsone Dodd - Performed by Eric "Monty" Morris
- A Joyful Process - Written by George Clinton and Bernie Worrell - Performed by Funkadelic
- Fantazias for the Viols - Written by Henry Purcell - Performed by Fretwork
- Nappy Dugout - Written by George Clinton / Cordell Mosson / Garry Shider - Performed by Funkadelic
- Louie Louie - Written by Richard Berry - Performed by Iggy Pop

== See also ==
- List of films shot over three or more years
