= Two Family House =

- Film poster
- Directed by: Raymond De Felitta
- Written by: Raymond De Felitta
- Produced by: Anne Harrison; Alan Klingenstein
- Starring: Michael Rispoli; Kelly Macdonald; Kathrine Narducci; Kevin Conway; Matt Servitto; Vincent Pastore
- Cinematography: Michael Mayers
- Edited by: David Leonard
- Music by: Stephen Endelman
- Distributed by: Lions Gate Films
- Release dates: January 21, 2000 (Sundance); October 6, 2000 (United States)
- Running time: 104 minutes
- Country: United States
- Language: English
- Box office: $1 million

Two Family House is a 2000 American romantic drama film written and directed by Raymond De Felitta, based on the story of De Felitta's uncle. The film won the Audience Award at the Sundance Film Festival. Many of the film's actors later reached national prominence as part of the HBO cable television series The Sopranos, including Michael Rispoli, Kathrine Narducci, Matt Servitto, Vincent Pastore, Joseph R. Gannascoli, Sharon Angela and Michele Santopietro (Jackie Aprile Sr., Charmaine Bucco, Agent Harris, Big Pussy, Vito Spatafore, Rosalie Aprile and JoJo Palmice, respectively, in The Sopranos). The songs on the film's soundtrack were done by John Pizzarelli and his trio, a jazz recording artist.

== Plot ==
An unseen narrator looks back to the year 1956, in the Elm Park neighborhood of Staten Island, New York, to one Buddy Visalo, an Italian guy with "Ralph Kramdenesque" dreams. Buddy is a wannabe crooner. Buddy had nearly been discovered by Arthur Godfrey ten years earlier when he performed at a USO show while in the service. His fiancée, Estelle, gave him a Hobson's choice: "Who's it gonna be, Buddy, Arthur Godfrey or me?" In a decision he'll live to regret the rest of his life, he chooses Estelle, and over the next 10 years tries all sorts of schemes to get ahead. "I just wanna be somebody!" he declares.

Italian-American Buddy decides to buy a dilapidated two-family house in the Irish section of town, intending to live upstairs with his wife Estelle and run a bar downstairs, where he could live out a smaller version of his dream, singing along to a "Music Minus One" jukebox. Estelle has no confidence in Buddy and just wants a "normal" blue-collar husband who, most of all, won't "embarrass" her by doing anything to make himself stand out, and manages to undermine his plans time and time again. He discovers, to his dismay and her horror, that the upstairs Irish tenants, drunken, violent Jim O'Neary and his very pregnant young wife Mary, refuse to move and won't pay rent.

When the baby is born, it's clear his father is black – and the much older, drunken Irish husband immediately skulks off, knowing it's not his child. Buddy evicts Mary and her child, then feels guilt and sets her up in an apartment while she sorts out an adoption. Estelle's lack of faith, the small-minded prejudices and low ambitions of his "friends", the Irish lass's spirit, Buddy's dream, racial prejudice, and the baby's fate play out in an engaging story with real chemistry between the leads and a message that ultimately exemplifies a Joseph Campbell-like "Follow your bliss."

== Cast ==
- Michael Rispoli as Buddy Visalo
- Kelly Macdonald as Mary O'Neary
- Kathrine Narducci as Estelle Visalo
- Kevin Conway as Jim O'Neary
- Matt Servitto as "Chipmunk"
- Michele Santopietro as Laura
- Louis Guss as Donato
- Rosemary De Angelis as Marie
- Anthony Arkin as Danny
- Saul Stein as Anthony
- Vincent Pastore as Angelo
- Sharon Angela as Gloria
- Joseph R. Gannascoli as Counter Guy
- Frank Whaley as The Narrator (uncredited)

== Reception ==
On review aggregate website Rotten Tomatoes, Two Family House has an approval rating of 89% based on 35 reviews.

Roger Ebert awarded the film 3 and ½ stars out of 4. In his review, he wrote, "Michael Rispoli gets one of the roles of a lifetime. He's the kind of guy we all know, who is unwilling to accept the hand that life (or his wife) has dealt him. His victory may be small in the great scheme of things, but it is satisfying." He concluded Two Family House "is about a guy doing someone a good turn when they need it. It doesn't need the uplifting apparatus of 'Pay It Forward.' It may not be as commercial, but I suspect it may strike deeper in the hearts of its viewers."

In a review that awarded an A− grade, Entertainment Weekly's Lisa Schwarzbaum said, De Felitta "bathes a very specific time, place, class, and ethnic experience — that of working-class Italian-American New Yorkers on Staten Island in 1956 — with a warm, clear light. His is 'Sundance-style' filmmaking at its most successful — personal with universal undertones, told with an unobtrusive flair that keeps the story, rather than the storyteller, in the foreground."

At the 2000 Sundance Film Festival where the film had its world premiere, it won the Audience Award in the Dramatic section.
