= Joe Viterelli =

American actor (1937–2004)

- Born: March 10, 1937; New York City, U.S.
- Died: January 28, 2004 (aged 66); Las Vegas, Nevada, U.S.
- Resting place: Holy Cross Cemetery, Culver City, California, U.S.
- Occupation: Actor
- Years active: 1990–2004
- Spouse: Catherine Brennan (m. 1960)
- Children: 5

Joseph Viterelli (March 10, 1937 – January 28, 2004) was an American actor. He was best known for playing Italian-American mobsters. He gained widespread recognition for portraying Jelly in Analyze This (1999) and Analyze That (2002).

== Early life ==
Viterelli was born on March 10, 1937, in New York City and grew up in a tough neighborhood on Manhattan's Lower East Side. He played classical guitar but did not tell his friends about it. "They woulda thought I was a sissy", he said. "I used to save my hard-robbed money and sneak off to Carnegie Hall and Broadway theaters."

== Early career ==
While in his 20s, he inherited four music schools in Queens that had been started by his family. "I actually taught classical guitar. But things went wrong. Then I opened a few bars. I drove a truck. I owned a cleaning service. I even had a job drilling holes in bowling balls to feed my five kids."

Viterelli moved to Los Angeles in the late 1970s. While living in Malibu, Viterelli became friends with director Leo Penn, who saw the screen possibilities in Viterelli's tough-guy visage. Penn thought Viterelli's tough-guy features would play well in the movies and on television.

Viterelli told Larry King that before he acted, "I had a couple of beer joints that I sold in New York and I came out here (in California) and I was looking around."

== Acting ==
"(Leo Penn) asked me to be in some movies and TV, but I always declined," said Viterelli. "I said, 'For half my life, I've been keeping a low profile and now you want to put my mug on a 40-foot screen?'"

Years later, Viterelli got a call from Penn's actor son, Sean, who was in New York City to make the 1990 gangster melodrama State of Grace. Viterelli recalled: "(Sean) said, 'Joe, we're looking for a character that's from your neighborhood. We've seen about 50 to 60 people and nobody's right.' He said the key words, 'Would you do me a favor?'" Viterelli did and, proving to be a natural actor, launched his new career. Viterelli later appeared in Penn's The Crossing Guard (1995).

Throughout the 1990s and early 2000s, Viterelli had appeared in more than 40 movies, playing guys with such names as Nick Valenti (Bullets Over Broadway; 1994), Joe Profaci (Mobsters; 1991), Fat Tommy Carducci (What She Doesn't Know; 1992), Vinnie "The Shrimp" (Mickey Blue Eyes; 1999) and Fat Tony Ragoni (The Cure for Boredom; 2001). He also had a supporting role in Shallow Hal (2001) and played Joseph Valachi in Ruby (1992). He also appeared in Eraser (1996).

A year before his death, Viterelli was considered for a role as former Governor of Illinois George Ryan in a biopic Abby Mann attempted to make.

=== Jelly ===
In 1999, he played Jelly, the menacing yet lovable henchman–confidant to Robert De Niro's anxiety-prone mob boss, in Analyze This (1999), costarring Billy Crystal as De Niro's reluctant psychiatrist.

Viterelli was able to convince De Niro and director Harold Ramis to cast him as Jelly after almost losing the role to a much younger actor.

When he described Viterelli's Jelly character patiently padding about "trying to deal with the disturbing news that his boss is cracking up and seeing a shrink," critic Roger Ebert wrote, "He lends a subtle dimension to the movie; he gives [De Niro's mob boss] a context, and someone who understands him. The comedy here isn't all on the surface, and Viterelli is one reason why."

The sequel, Analyze That, in which Viterelli reprised his role, was his final film.

In a Larry King Live interview, Viterelli said that De Niro was the "(e)asiest man to work with in the world," and that Crystal was "the funniest guy I ever met in my life."

=== Staples commercial ===
Viterelli can be seen in a Staples television commercial in which he provides mob-style "muscle" for an office worker who is having a problem dealing with a manager who demands doughnuts and pastry bribes in exchange for dispensing office supplies. The humorous spot, which debuted during Super Bowl XXXVIII, was Viterelli's only commercial.

== Personal life ==
"Ninety percent of my fan mail is from kids 6 through 19," he told the New York Daily News in 2000. "They send me graduation pictures and report cards. Look at me, I'm a role model."

Viterelli never had an agent or a manager.

Viterelli participated in a roast of Magic Johnson, during which he told a joke about finding the former NBA star handcuffed to a tree naked, just after he had gotten robbed.

== Death ==
Viterelli died on January 28, 2004, aged 66, of complications from heart surgery at Valley Hospital in Las Vegas. He was survived by his wife, Catherine, and five children, including his son, the film composer Joseph Vitarelli, who spells his last name differently. One of his children is a lawyer.

== Filmography ==
- 1990: State of Grace as Borelli
- 1991: Mobsters as Joe Profaci
- 1991: Palace Guard (TV miniseries)
- 1992: What She Doesn't Know (TV movie) as Fat Tommy Carducci
- 1992: Ruby as Joseph Valachi
- 1992: In the Shadow of a Killer (TV movie) as Gino Marchese
- 1993: The Firm as Joey Morolto (uncredited)
- 1993: Fallen Angels (TV series) as Ugolino
- 1994: Bullets Over Broadway as Nick Valenti
- 1994: The Commish (TV series) as Victor Kasabian
- 1995: Marker (TV series)
- 1995: The Crossing Guard as Joe at bar
- 1996: Black Rose of Harlem as Costanza
- 1996: Heaven's Prisoners as Didi Giancano
- 1996: Eraser as Tony Two-Toes
- 1996: American Strays as Gene
- 1997: Out to Sea as Mickey (uncredited)
- 1997: Looking for Lola as Salvatore Greco
- 1998: Mafia! as Dominick Clamatto
- 1999: Analyze This as Jelly
- 1999: Façade as Max
- 1999: The Tonight Show with Jay Leno (TV series) as himself
- 1999: The Making of a Mobster: 'Mickey Blue Eyes (TV documentary) as himself
- 1999: Mickey Blue Eyes as Vinnie D'Agostino
- 1999: Hitman's Run as Jimmy / Howard Sussman (uncredited)
- 1999: A Walk in the Park as Mr. Costello
- 1999–2000: The Strip (TV series) as Cameron Greene
- 2000: Wannabes as Santo
- 2001: See Spot Run as Gino
- 2001: Italian Ties as Charlie
- 2001: The Cure for Boredom as "Fat" Tony Ragoni
- 2001: Shallow Hal as Steve Shanahan
- 2001: Donzi: The Legend as Jack Kramer
- 2002: Serving Sara as Fat Charlie
- 2002: Analyze That as Jelly (final film role)
- 2003: NFL Monday Night Football: Dallas Cowboys vs. New York Giants as himself (uncredited)
- 2008: Mr. Laughs: A Look Behind the Curtain (Documentary) as himself
- 2017: R Spasoff Comedian Comedy Skit with Joe Viterelli (web series) as himself
