= Back in the Day (2016 film) =

- Directed by: Paul Borghese
- Written by: William DeMeo
- Produced by: William DeMeo
- Starring: William DeMeo; Michael Madsen; Alec Baldwin
- Cinematography: George Mitas
- Edited by: Ray Chung
- Music by: Randy Edelman; Andrew Markus
- Release date: May 20, 2016
- Running time: 121 minutes
- Country: United States
- Language: English

Back in the Day (titled "Brooklyn's Greatest" and "Lords of Brooklyn" in some markets) a 2016 American sports drama film directed by Paul Borghese, and starring William DeMeo, Michael Madsen and Alec Baldwin.

== Cast ==
- William DeMeo as Anthony Rodriguez
- Christian DeMeo as Young Anthony Rodriguez
- Joseph D'Onofrio as Matty
- Michael Madsen as Enzo
- Alec Baldwin as Gino Fratelli
- Mike Tyson as himself
- Annabella Sciorra as Mary
- Shannen Doherty as Maria
- Danny Glover as Eddie "Rocks" Travor
- Manny Pérez as Jose
- Larry Merchant as himself
- Lillo Brancato Jr. as Nicky
