= This Thing of Ours (film) =

- Directed by: Danny Provenzano
- Written by: Ted A. Bohus; Danny Provenzano
- Produced by: Ted A. Bohus; Michael DelGaizo
- Starring: Danny Provenzano; Frank Vincent; Edward Lynch; Vincent Pastore; James Caan; John Speciale
- Distributed by: Maverick
- Release dates: January 25, 2002 (Sarasota Film Festival); July 18, 2003 (United States)
- Running time: 100 minutes
- Country: United States
- Language: English

This Thing of Ours is an American 2002 crime drama film directed by Danny Provenzano and starring him alongside Frank Vincent, Edward Lynch, Vincent Pastore and James Caan. The title is a reference to the Italian term Cosa Nostra, "This Thing Of Ours", which refers to the American Mafia. Colombo crime family underboss, John Franzese, was an associate producer of the film.

The film garnered primarily negative reviews, earning a 40% score on Rotten Tomatoes and receiving a 36/100 on the review aggregator Metacritic, signifying generally unfavorable reviews.

== Plot ==
Using the internet and old-school mafia traditions, a crew of young gangsters led by Nicholas "Nicky" Santini attempt to pull off the biggest heist in the history of the mafia. Nicky must first convince his uncle Danny Santini, a respected caporegime of the Genovesso crime family in New Jersey, to put up the necessary "seed money", $50 million. When Danny agrees, Nicky along his partner and friend Johnny "Irish" Kelly use violence and murder to put the plan in motion. But as much as things seem to be changing in the family's way of doing business, old habits and traditions remain and Nicholas must decide between his friends who helped him pull off the scam or his uncle Danny.

== Cast ==
- Danny Provenzano as Nicholas Santini
- Frank Vincent as Danny Santini
- Edward Lynch as Johnny "Irish" Kelly
- Vincent Pastore as Skippy
- James Caan as Jimmy "The Con"
- Chuck Zito as Chuck
- Louis Vanaria as Austin Palermo
- Christian Maelen as Robert Biaggio
- Michael DelGaizo as Patsy DeGrazio
- Pat Cooper as John Bruno
- Vinny Vella as Carmine
- Joseph Rigano as Joe
- Tony Ray Rossi as Anthony Russo
- Jonathan Doscher as Agent Clark
- Melissa Bacelar as Secretary
- Gaetano LoGiudice as Tommy
- John Speciale as Jimmy S.
