= The Donner Party (2009 film) =

2009 film

The Donner Party (2009)
- Theatrical release poster
- Directed by: Terrence Martin
- Screenplay by: Terrence Martin
- Produced by: Mark Costa; Ted Meyer; John Emerson Moore
- Starring: Crispin Glover; Clayne Crawford; Mark Boone Junior; Christian Kane
- Cinematography: Seamus Tierney
- Edited by: Richard Conkling; John Emerson Moore
- Music by: Eimear Noone
- Production company: Anacapa Entertainment
- Distributed by: First Look International
- Release date: October 23, 2009 (Austin Film Festival)
- Running time: 95 minutes
- Country: United States
- Language: English

The Donner Party is a 2009 American period Western drama film written and directed by Terrence Martin (credited as T.J. Martin), and starring Crispin Glover, Clayne Crawford, Michele Santopietro, Mark Boone Junior, and Christian Kane. It is based on the true story of the Donner Party, an 1840s westward traveling group of settlers headed for California. Becoming snowbound in the Sierra Nevada mountains, with food increasingly scarce, a small group calling themselves "The Forlorn Hope" turned to cannibalism. The Forlorn was the working title for the film.

== Plot ==
The film opens with text explaining who the Donner Party was and how they ended up in the terrible situation of passing the cutoff. It then proceeds to a dramatization largely following the exploits of main character William Foster (Crispin Glover) during the attempt to cross the Sierra Nevada mountains and his group that would be later known as "The Forlorn Hope" whilst seeking rescue for the broader Donner Party (the film chooses to focus on a select few characters, while in the real-life background the Donner-Reed Party consisted of a fairly large group of multiple families). The film takes several artistic liberties with the true story basis, and combines multiple real-life historic figures from the Donner-Reed Party into these characters.

William Foster is bothered by the deterioration he sees in the makeshift camps built by the Donner Party, the increasing worry of the women and children in the camps, and a recent death which concludes in a burial while onlookers grieve, distraught. He prays frequently, hoping that devotion to God will provide some hope for his fellow pioneers, and as things continue to get worse and the snowfall builds, he opts to go on ahead and seek aid in rescue. Foster finds himself consistently at odds with fellow pioneer William Eddy (Clayne Crawford), and the group begins to bicker as rations grow more scarce. Violence ensues, including a fight during which a person is nearly stabbed to death, and when starvation sets in, the group decides to draw straws to decide which man will be sacrificed (Eddy proclaims he will not participate in the "game", and neither will the group's Native American guide, Luis (John A. Lorenz)). Foster ends up executing fellow pioneer Milt McCutchen (Jack Kyle) with a gunshot wound to the back of the head after the man ends up drawing the shortest straw.

Fosdick is criticized for failing to add any ration to the shared pot of food that the group is collecting, and he in turn chastises Foster for his callousness in executing McCutchen, to which Foster remarks, "everyone is to contribute to the pot equally". Eddy later has disturbing delusions in his sleep of his wife, Eleanor (Jamie Anne Allman) standing in the snow in a white dress, totally emaciated, holding a deceased infant's corpse as it drips with blood. Upon awakening, he discovers that Luis, whom Eddy has been secretly protecting, has fled into the forest, with Foster looking for him after suspecting him of misleading the group. Eddy holds a crazed Foster at gunpoint, but is unable to shoot the man. Foster finds Luis and bludgeons him to death before eviscerating his corpse off-screen; meanwhile Eddy collapses in the snow from illness due to starvation, and Amanda McCutchen feeds him meat.

Fosdick severely lacerates his leg in a sudden fall, and fearing that Foster will murder the man in his weakened state, his wife, Ann Fosdick (Catherine Black) savagely asserts that he is fine. Foster becomes extremely bloodthirsty, and it is implied that he feeds his group the butchered corpse of Luis, as they all gnaw in horror upon pieces of bizarre-looking meat. Ann and Jay Fosdick find that whenever Ann isn't present, Foster is sneaking up behind Jay with strange offers to put him out of his misery due to his injured leg. Ann chases Foster off, and as Foster saunters away, he is seen holding a knife in his hand. It is unclear whether these disturbing sights are real, or merely paranoid delusions among the group. As the group continues to starve and freeze to death, Foster is left weak and shivering under blankets. One morning, Eddy spots fresh deer tracks and sets off to hunt, joined by fellow pioneer Mary Graves (Alison Haislip). Eddy and Mary track down the deer and kill it, collect its meat, and Eddy decides to continue alone on the journey to California, leaving Mary behind. The next morning, Ann finds that Jay Fosdick has died during the night and is heartbroken. Foster tries to take Fosdick to feed the group, but Ann refuses to give him up. He sneaks up the next night and takes him by force. As Foster, his wife and Amanda McCutchen (Michele Santopietro), (the wife of the earlier-executed Milt McCutchen) later gather together before a solemn campfire (presumably eating Fosdick), Mary returns and proceeds to secretly arm Ann Fosdick with a shotgun. Catching Foster off guard and unaware, Ann procedures to execute him with a gunshot wound to the face. The film ends with William Eddy collapsing in the snow, presumably near his destination as two men are shown discovering his fallen body, the sound of his heart still beating as he is finally rescued. The camera slowly pans out, with captioning on the screen indicating that Eddy's wife and son (who remained behind in Illinois) had died sometime over the winter; of the "Forlorn Hope" group, only 5 survived.

== Cast ==
- Crispin Glover as William Foster
- Clayne Crawford as William Eddy
- Michele Santopietro as Amanda McCutchen
- Mark Boone Junior as Franklin Graves
- Christian Kane as Charles Stanton
- Crispian Belfrage as Patrick Dolan
- Catherine Black as Ann Fosdick
- Jamie Anne Allman as Eleanor Eddy
- Jack Kyle as Milt McCutchen
- Cary Wayne as Jay Fosdick
- Alison Haislip as Mary Graves
- Mara LaFontaine as Sarah Foster
- John A. Lorenz as Luis

== Production ==
As well as being Martin's directorial debut, The Donner Party was production company Anacapa Entertainment's first feature film. It premiered at the Austin Film Festival on October 23, 2009, Its DVD release was three months later on January 26. Shooting was swift, with principal photography at the Donner Pass, California taking only 12 days. Originally, the work had a higher budget, with greater use of child stars and a longer shooting schedule. However, the original production company pulled funding for the project, so several changes were made. The title change was a marketing choice by the distributor.

The soundtrack was done by the Aspiro Choir under Mary Amond O'Brien.

== Release ==
The film was released on DVD by First Look Pictures on January 26, 2010. It was later re-released by Millennium Entertainment on October 20, 2015, as a part of its 12 Movie Sci-Fi Pack.

== Reception ==
The website Bloody Good Horror gave the film an unfavorable review, describing Crispin Glover's performance as boring and the story dull. "Simply put, 'The Donner Party' is a plodding chore of a movie to watch. It’s a history professor’s voiceover away from being indistinguishable from your average History Channel reenactment."

Dread Central awarded the film a score of three out of five, commending Glover and Boone Junior's performances, writing: "T.J. Martin's cinematic version of this dreadful episode in American history is carried off rather well although, as always seems to be the case with films based on historical events, a lot of what transpires in the film never happened, which IS annoying to history buffs like myself. At least the film was shot during the winter in the Donner Pass near Truckee, California, which helped with the verisimilitude." Horror News.Net gave the film a positive review, writing, "Overall "The Donner Party" was a nice change from the hard core horror films that I usually watch. I have a feeling it will be shown in a lot of high school history classes in the future as there is really nothing offensive that would make it inappropriate for younger viewers. If you are in the mood for something a little different I suggest you give it a try. I also recommend that you have something to eat on hand while watching it as I was starving by the time I was done watching it. Then again, maybe I have issues."

== See also ==
- Cannibalism in popular culture
- Survival film
