= American Strays =

- DVD cover for 2000 collector's edition release.
- Directed by: Michael Covert
- Written by: Michael Covert
- Produced by: Frank Agrama; Trudi Callon; Rod Dean; Kirk Hassig; Doug Textor
- Starring: Luke Perry; Eric Roberts; Jennifer Tilly; John Savage; Carol Kane; James Russo; Joe Viterelli; Sam Jones; Brion James
- Music by: John R. Graham
- Release date: September 13, 1996
- Running time: 97 minutes
- Country: United States
- Language: English
- Box office: $1,910 (US)

American Strays is a 1996 American comedy-drama film directed by Michael Covert. It follows three interwoven stories of desert travelers as they converge on a small diner.

== Synopsis ==
Red's Desert Diner Oasis, a dive in the middle of nowhere, becomes the focal point of three separate storylines. In the first, Dwayne (Savage), a homicidal vacuum cleaner salesman, may have met his match in Patty Mae (Tilly), a woman with an impressive collection of sweepers. The second story follows Johnny (Perry), a suicidal man who hires a sadistic hitman (Jones) to end his life anyway possible which includes beating the ever loving crap out of him. The third story follows an unemployed man (Roberts) and his family, two mobsters (Viterelli and Russo), and others as they travel across the emptiness of the American Southwest.

== Cast ==
- Scott Plank as Sonny
- Melora Walters as Cindy
- John Savage as Dwayne
- Brion James as Oris
- Joe Viterelli as Gene
- James Russo as Eddie
- Luke Perry as Johnny
- Will Rothhaar as Jordan
- Jessica Lerelman as Daphne
- Toni Kalem as Alice
- Eric Roberts as Martin
- Vonte Sweet as "Mondo"
- Anthony Lee as Omar
- Stephanie Cushna as Johnny's Girlfriend
- Sam J. Jones as The Exterminator
- Stace Williamson as Johnny's Brother
- Carol Kane as Helen
- Luana Anders as Martha
- Jack Kehler as Walker
- Robert Fields as Harry
- Charles Bailey-Gates as Bobby
- Thomas Elliott as Timmy
- Jennifer Tilly as Patty Mae
- Michael Horse as Lead Cop
- Leland Crooke as Cop #2
- Michael Kaliski as Cop #3
- Patrick Warburton as Rookie Cop

== Reception ==
American Strays was released to a single theater on September 13, 1996. The film grossed $1,183 in its opening weekend and $1,910 in total during its theatrical release.

Stephen Holden of The New York Times wrote in his review that the film "has the germ of a good idea" but concluded American Strays is "a spoof in search of a sense of humor".
