= Analyze That =

2002 film by Harold Ramis

- Theatrical release poster
- Directed by: Harold Ramis
- Written by: Peter Tolan; Peter Steinfeld; Harold Ramis
- Based on: Characters by Kenneth Lonergan; Peter Tolan
- Produced by: Paula Weinstein; Jane Rosenthal
- Starring: Robert De Niro; Billy Crystal; Lisa Kudrow; Joe Viterelli; Cathy Moriarty
- Cinematography: Ellen Kuras
- Edited by: Andrew Mondshein
- Music by: David Holmes
- Production companies: Village Roadshow Pictures; NPV Entertainment; Baltimore Spring Creek Pictures; Face Productions; TriBeCa Productions
- Distributed by: Warner Bros. Pictures
- Release date: December 6, 2002
- Running time: 96 minutes
- Country: United States
- Language: English
- Budget: $60 million
- Box office: $55 million

Analyze That is a 2002 American crime comedy film directed by Harold Ramis and produced by Paula Weinstein and Jane Rosenthal. It is a sequel to the 1999 film Analyze This. The film stars Robert De Niro and Billy Crystal, who reprise their roles as mobster Paul Vitti and psychiatrist Ben Sobel, respectively.

Following the success of the first film, Warner Bros. Pictures developed a follow-up to the film, with much of the same cast and crew returning. Analyze That was released on December 6, 2002, and failed to achieve the critical and commercial success of the first film, grossing only $55 million worldwide against its $60 million budget.

== Plot ==
Near the completion of his sentence in Sing Sing, Paul Vitti's life is threatened by assassins and corrupt guards while incarcerated. He starts singing showtunes from West Side Story to get the attention of Ben Sobel, who previously hung up on him while attending his father's funeral.

The FBI assigns Ben to perform psychiatric tests on Paul to determine if he is feigning insanity. After the tests, it appears that Paul's mental state is deteriorating, and the FBI approves Paul's release into Ben's custody for one month of further therapy. As Ben drives Paul from prison, Paul immediately reveals that he was faking.

Ben persuades Paul to find a regular job, as requested by the FBI. Paul attempts to find a legitimate job—in a car dealer, a restaurant and a jewelry store—but his rude manners and paranoia complicate things, ending in his getting fired from each job.

At the same time, Paul is told by de facto boss Patti LoPresti that the Rigazzi family wants him dead. He responds by telling the Rigazzis that he is "out" and is seeking a new line of employment. He eventually finds employment working as a technical advisor on the set of a TV series based on the Mafia.

Meanwhile, FBI agents inform Ben that Paul has gathered right hand man Jelly and his old crew, and may be planning something major. This rouses Ben's suspicion, and he visits Paul. They both become involved in a car chase with Rigazzi hitmen, which ends with Paul escaping. The FBI blames Ben and gives him 24 hours to locate Paul.

After tracking down Paul through Ben's son Michael, who is now working as Paul's chauffeur, Ben discovers that Paul is planning a big, armored car heist, with LoPresti as a partner. He attempts to intervene and talk Paul out of it, but Paul proceeds, and Ben is forced to go along.

The crew ambushes the armored car with smoke grenades and lifts it over a fence in the midst of the confusion. They extract more than $22 million of gold bullion, but LoPresti's thugs take over, revealing themselves to have been working for Rigazzi. Ben, in a fit of anger, beats their leader Eddie, and Paul's men restrain the others.

Paul's crew uses the gold bullion to frame the Rigazzi family, leaving Eddie and the Rigazzi goons locked in the armored truck, which is suspended from the crane. This leads to the arrest of the entire Rigazzi family, preventing a mob war. Paul, Ben, Jelly, and the others escape, having created a distraction by using Paul's film crew connections to confuse the federal agents.

Ben meets with Paul and Jelly near bridges on the New York waterfront, and they part ways as friends, singing another West Side Story showtune.

== Cast ==
- Robert De Niro as Paul Vitti
- Billy Crystal as Ben Sobel
- Lisa Kudrow as Laura Sobel
- Joe Viterelli as "Jelly"
- Cathy Moriarty-Gentile as Patti LoPresti
- Reg Rogers as Raoul Berman
- John Finn as Richard Chapin
- Kyle Sabihy as Michael Sobel
- Callie Thorne as FBI Agent Cerrone
- Pat Cooper as Masiello
- Frank Gio as Lou "The Wrench" Rigazzi
- Donnamarie Recco as Sheila
- Joey "Coco" Diaz as "Ducks"
- Thomas Rosales, Jr. as "Coyote"
- Rebecca Schull as Dorothy Sobel
- Dr. Joyce Brothers as herself
- James Biberi as FBI Agent Miller
- Firdous Bamji as Dr. Kassam
- Sylvia Kauders as Aunt Esther
- Steven Kampmann as Mr. Macinerny
- Tom Papa as Boyfriend
- Raymond Franza as Eddie DeVol
- William DeMeo as Al Pacino
- Joe Torre as himself
- Paul Herman as Joey "Boots"
- Charles A. Gargano as Maitre'D
- Vinny Vella, Sr. as Mello
- Demetri Martin as P.A.
- Gina Lynn as Stripper
- Anthony LaPaglia as Antony Bella who plays Nicky Caesar in the fictitious series Little Caesar (uncredited)

== Production ==
=== Pre-production ===
Initially, there was no plan to create a sequel to Analyze This, but the critical acclaim and box-office success generated by the first film encouraged the producers to consider a sequel and discuss it with the studio and actors. They believed, according to Billy Crystal, that "there was an unfinished relationship between Ben Sobel and Paul Vitti from the first film" and that "there was a good story to tell", so the sequel was commissioned.

The story of the sequel was inspired by an article in The New York Times about the psychotherapy used in the Mafia series The Sopranos. Harold Ramis said that the article "raised questions about human nature and morality...Can the criminal mind be turned?", so he became interested in what would happen if "Paul Vitti got out of jail and committed himself to going straight".

The production arranged for Dr. Stephen A. Sands, a psychiatrist and faculty member of Columbia University College of Physicians and Surgeons, to be a technical adviser for the film, and he remained on set during the filming of scenes that involved psychiatric issues. Sands was very familiar with the details of mobster Vincent "The Chin" Gigante's alleged mental illness after studying the case during his post-doctoral training. Sands also arranged for Robert De Niro to visit Bellevue Hospital's psychiatric unit to meet patients and psychiatrists to discuss the character's symptoms, and De Niro sometimes participated in group therapy sessions during these visits.

=== Filming ===
Filming began in April 2002, and most of the scenes were shot in and around New York City, seven months after the 9/11 attacks. Producer Jane Rosenthal said that they decided to shoot the film there because "[i]t would have been unpatriotic not to shoot the picture in New York... As a New Yorker it was extremely important for me to get back to work and business as usual after 9/11."

Filming locations for Vitti's attempts at lawful employment include an Audi dealership on Park Avenue in Manhattan, a jewelry store in the Diamond District on West 47th Street, and Gallagher's Steak House on West 52nd Street. The prison scenes were filmed at the Riker's Island prison in Queens, with the prison-release scene shot outside of the entrance to Sing Sing Prison in Ossining, New York. The funeral for Ben's father was filmed at Riverside Memorial Chapel on Manhattan's Upper West Side, and the Sobel household scenes were shot in Montclair, New Jersey. The dinner at Nogo restaurant was filmed at West 13th Street, in a restaurant that had closed and had been refurbished by the film's art department. The scenes of Patty LoPresti's home were filmed in Ho-Ho-Kus, New Jersey, and the Little Caesar was set in Washington Square Park, Manhattan.

Car chases were filmed on New Jersey Turnpike service roads in Kearney. The heist-planning scenes were shot in two locations: a derelict building in the meat-packing district near West 14th Street, and a club called Exit on West 56th Street. The majority of the heist scenes were shot in an empty lot in West 57th Street between 11th and 12th Avenues, and below a West Side Highway underpass. While filming part of the heist sequence at the New York State 369th Regiment Armory on 145th Street and Fifth Avenue, the film set was visited by former President Bill Clinton, who was pleased that the movie was being filmed in New York. The scene at a drive-through bank before the police chase was filmed in Carlstadt, New Jersey.

During filming in Manhattan's Chelsea district on June 14, Amanda Winklevoss, the older sister of Cameron and Tyler Winklevoss, died from a cardiac arrest due to a drug overdose after climbing into a camera truck.

Cinematographer Ellen Kuras said that in shooting the film, the intention was to highlight the contrast between Vitti and Sobel's environments, because the film "exists in two different worlds... We wanted to evoke the contrast so we made Vitti's world cool, blue and blue-green, whereas Ben's world has a brighter, warmer palette, yellows and oranges that provide a neutral tone."

== Release ==
=== Home media ===
Analyze That was released on DVD and VHS on May 13, 2003.

== Reception ==
=== Box office ===
Analyze That opened in 2,635 theaters and grossed $11 million in its opening weekend, ranking second behind Die Another Day. The film went on to gross $32 million at the domestic box office and a further $23 million at the international box office, for a worldwide total of $55 million against its $60 million budget.

=== Critical reception ===
On the review aggregator website Rotten Tomatoes, 26% of 149 critics' reviews are positive, with an average rating of 4.8/10. The website's consensus reads: "The one joke premise is stretched a bit thin in this messy sequel, but a few laughs can be had here and there." Metacritic, which uses a weighted average, assigned the film a score of 37 out of 100, based on 34 critics, indicating "generally unfavorable" reviews. Audiences polled by CinemaScore gave the film an average grade of "B" on a scale of A+ to F.

Roger Ebert of the Chicago Sun-Times gave the film 2 stars out of 4, and wrote, "If the first film seemed to flow naturally from the premise, this one seems to slink uneasily onto the screen, aware that it feels exactly like a facile, superficial recycling job." Ty Burr of The Boston Globe said, "Still, that this witless, formulaic sequel to the hit comedy Analyze This even dares to spoof The Sopranos is embarrassing. It's like Freddie Prinze Jr. slamming Gene Hackman as a bad actor."

The film won the award for Worst Sequel at the 2002 Stinkers Bad Movie Awards.
