= Vinny Vella =

American actor (1947–2019)

- Born: Vincent Frank Vella; January 11, 1947; Greenwich Village, New York City, New York, US
- Died: February 20, 2019 (aged 72); New York City, New York, US
- Occupations: Actor, talk show host, comedian
- Spouse: Margaret Ann Hernandez
- Children: 5

Vincent Frank Vella (January 11, 1947 – February 20, 2019) was an American actor, talk show host and comedian. He acted in more than forty films often in the role of a gangster. He was best known for the role of Artie Piscano in Martin Scorsese's Casino and Jimmy Petrille in the HBO series The Sopranos.

== Early life ==
Vella was born on Bleecker Street in Greenwich Village, New York City. His father was from Bari, Italy and his mother was from Naples, Italy. Vella's father had a fish store in Little Italy.

== Career ==
Vella acted in more than forty films often in the role of gangster. He was best known for the role of Artie Piscano in Martin Scorsese's Casino. He played Jimmy Petrille on the HBO series The Sopranos. He was the subject of a 67-minute 2000 documentary called Hey, Vinny by director John Huba. In New York City, he hosted a public-access television cable TV show on MNN, the Vinny Vella show. He appeared in more than 35 advertisements.

== Personal life ==
He was married to Margaret Ann Hernandez; they had one son, Vincent Vella Jr. Besides Vincent Vella Jr., Vinny was also a father to Ben and Anthony Hernandez, Jennifer Maloney and Lauren Vella. Vella was at one time the "Mayor of Elizabeth Street". In 2007, he opened his own pizzeria in Williamsburg, a neighborhood in the New York City borough of Brooklyn.

In June 2008, Vella was involved in controversy around a lottery ticket, according to some sources, and threatened to sue over it.

== Death ==
Vella died at home on Elizabeth Street, New York City on February 20, 2019, due to liver cancer, at age 72.

== Filmography ==
=== Film ===
Vella's films include:

Year	Title	Role	Notes
1994	Season of Change	Michael	
1995	Casino	Artie Piscano	
1997	Donnie Brasco	Mobster In Photo	Uncredited
1998	Rounders	Card Player at KGB's	
1999	Ghost Dog	Sammy "The Snake"	
2000	Wannabes	Carmine	
2000	Hey, Vinny	Himself	Documentary, by director John Huba
2001	Kissing Jessica Stein	Cab Driver	
2002	Analyze That	Mello	
2003	This Thing of Ours	Carmine	
2003	Coffee and Cigarettes	Vinny	(segment "Those Things'll Kill Ya")
2004	The Kings of Brooklyn	Man	
2006	Find Me Guilty	Graziedei	
2007	Holla at Me	Frankie Maldini	
2009	Chasing the Green	Vincent	
2009	Sicilian Tale	Don Sebastiano Militello	
2009	New York Blood	The Boss	
2011	Kill the Irishman	Frank 'Little Frank' Brancato	
2013	Milwood	Chef Dino	
2017	Monsters of Mulberry Street	Paulie Spagnuolo	
2019	The Irishman	Meat Company Yard Manager	
TBA	Blood Money		

=== Television ===
Year	Title	Role	Notes
1999-2004	The Sopranos	Jimmy Petrille	4 episodes
2004	Law & Order	Jilts	Episode: "Everybody Loves Raimondo's"
2013	The Vinny Vella show	Vinny	1 episode
