= William DeMeo =

American actor

- Occupation: Actor
- Years active: 1993–present

William DeMeo is an American actor. He is known for his acting roles in Analyze That, First Kill and The Sopranos. He also played the role of Sammy Gravano in the 2018 film Gotti.

== Career ==
DeMeo was born in Gravesend, Brooklyn and raised in Bensonhurst, Brooklyn, and attended Bishop Ford Central Catholic High School.

His first acting role was in the 1993 film, A Bronx Tale, directed by Robert De Niro. He later went on to write, produce, and star in the films: One Deadly Road, Wannabes, Searching for Bobby D, Once Upon a Time in Brooklyn and Back in the Day. DeMeo also had a recurring role in the hit television series The Sopranos, in which he played the character Jason Molinaro. In 2016, he directed his first documentary film, Cruisin 86th St., which focused on the story of his neighborhood in the ‘70s, ‘80s and early ‘90s. DeMeo developed a television series called The Neighborhood, set in 1980s Brooklyn, which follows the story of a mob soldier looking to leave behind his life of crime.

== Filmography ==
=== Film ===
| Year | Title | Role | Notes |
|---|---|---|---|
| 1993 | A Bronx Tale | Italian Guy in Bronx Playing Stickball | |
| 1995 | Hackers | Jock | |
| 1998 | One Deadly Road | Tony Danitello | short |
| 2000 | Wannabes | Angelo Argono | |
| 2001 | Boss of Bosses | Young Carlo Gambino | TV movie |
| 2002 | Hamlet in the Hamptons | Vinnie | |
| 2002 | The Brooklyn Boys | Mafia Hood | |
| 2002 | The Pizza Tapes | Jimmy 'Slice' Marino | Short |
| 2002 | Analyze That | Al Pacino | |
| 2003 | I Am Woody | Anthony | Short |
| 2005 | Searching for Bobby D | Johnny Argano | |
| 2008 | The Drum Beats Twice | Officer Jerry | |
| 2009 | The Don of 42nd Street | Tommy | |
| 2010 | Hot Ice, No-one Is Safe | Lefty | |
| 2011 | Vito Bonafacci | Father LaGolbo | |
| 2013 | Once Upon a Time in Brooklyn | Bobby Baldano | |
| 2013 | Contract | Gino | Short |
| 2013 | Spit Boys | Franco 'Side-Step' Bindi | Short |
| 2015 | #Lucky Number | Blue Collar Mafia | |
| 2015 | Sight Unseen | Frankie DeMarco | |
| 2015 | The Bronx Dahmer | Mikey | Short |
| 2016 | Back in the Day | Anthony Rodriguez | |
| 2017 | Breaking Point | Tommy DeCarlo | |
| 2017 | First Kill | Richie | |
| 2017 | Good Friday | Rizzi | Short |
| 2018 | The Killer's Kiss | Vinny Gazzo | |
| 2018 | Gotti | Sammy Gravano | |
| 2018 | Sarah Q | Troy Remy | |
| 2019 | Bare Knuckle Brawler | Frank Harris | |
| 2021 | Made in Chinatown | Produce Joe | |
| 2021 | The Families Feud | Vinny Stromboli | |

=== Television ===
| Year | Title | Role | Notes |
|---|---|---|---|
| 1995 | New York Undercover | Sammy | Episode: "Innocent Bystanders" |
| 2004–07 | The Sopranos | Jason Molinaro | Supporting cast: Season 5-6 |
| 2011 | Blue Bloods | Vinny Vario | Episode: "Critical Condition" |
| 2015 | Person of Interest | Carlo | Episode: "Terra Incognita" |
| 2020–Present | Gravesend | Benny Zerletta | Main cast |

=== Video games ===
| Year | Title | Role | Notes |
|---|---|---|---|
| 2002 | Mafia | Paulie | (voice) |
