= Prom Queens (TV series) =

American reality television series

- Genre: Reality
- Country of origin: United States
- Original language: English
- No. of seasons: 1
- No. of episodes: 6

Production
- Executive producers: Abigail Harvey; Alex Baskin; Doug Ross; Gena McCarthy; Greg Stewart; Kathleen French; Mark Herwick; Rob Sharenow
- Running time: 22 minutes
- Production company: Evolution Media

Original release
- Network: Lifetime
- Release: September 20 – November 13, 2012

Prom Queens is an American reality television series on Lifetime that premiered on September 20, 2012. It follows female high school students located all over the United States who are competing for the prom queen title. Lifetime announced that the series had been picked up for an eight episode first season on July 12, 2012. With the series debut acquiring low viewership, Lifetime burned off the series on November 6, 2012, and November 13, 2012, by airing two episodes short of the series' order back in July.

== Episodes ==
No.	Title	Original release date	U.S. viewers (millions)
1	"Don't Mess With Texas"	September 20, 2012	0.560
2	"The Princess & the Party Girl"	September 20, 2012	N/A
3	"The Ruling Class"	November 6, 2012	N/A
4	"The Battle of the BFFs"	November 6, 2012	N/A
5	"Who's Got Swag?"	November 13, 2012	N/A
6	"It Pays to Be Popular"	November 13, 2012	N/A
