= Mickey Blue Eyes =

1999 film by Kelly Makin

- Theatrical release poster
- Directed by: Kelly Makin
- Written by: Adam Scheinman; Robert Kuhn
- Produced by: Elizabeth Hurley; Charles Mulvehill
- Starring: Hugh Grant; James Caan; Jeanne Tripplehorn; Burt Young; James Fox; Joe Viterelli
- Cinematography: Donald E. Thorin
- Edited by: David Freeman
- Music by: Basil Poledouris
- Production companies: Castle Rock Entertainment; Simian Films
- Distributed by: Warner Bros. (select territories); Universal Pictures International (international)
- Release date: August 20, 1999
- Running time: 102 minutes
- Countries: United Kingdom; United States
- Language: English
- Budget: $36 million
- Box office: $54.3 million

Mickey Blue Eyes is a 1999 romantic comedy crime film directed by Kelly Makin. Hugh Grant stars as Michael Felgate, an English auctioneer living in New York City who becomes entangled in his soon-to-be father-in-law's Mafia connections. Several of the minor roles are played by actors later featured in The Sopranos.

The film's title comes from Michael being forced to impersonate a gangster, who is spontaneously named "Kansas City Little Big Mickey Blue Eyes".

The film was released on August 20, 1999. It received mixed reviews from critics and grossed $54.3 million against its $36 million budget.

== Plot ==
Michael Felgate is an English auctioneer living in New York City where he manages the Cromwell auction house. He proposes marriage to his girlfriend Gina Vitale, but is disheartened to be turned down. Gina tearfully explains that her father Frank and most of her cousins and uncles are gangsters deeply involved in a Mafia crime family, and she is concerned that Michael will be forced into their world. Michael assures her that he will not let this happen, but barely is their engagement party over before he is unwittingly involved in a money laundering scam, and soon the FBI takes an interest in him.

When one of the money laundering scams at Michael's auction house goes wrong, Gina's cousin Johnny confronts and attacks Michael. Gina takes his gun and fires a warning shot into the ceiling, which ricochets and accidentally kills Johnny. Johnny's father Vito Graziosi finds out, and he tells Frank he will kill Gina unless Frank kills Michael during his wedding speech. Having grown fond of Michael, Frank confesses what Vito has ordered him to do to Michael and the two of them turn to the FBI in return for witness protection. The FBI set up an elaborate operation in which Michael's execution will be faked at the wedding reception. Michael is given a hidden recording device and is tasked with trying to record Vito into admitting his criminal activity on tape before he is "executed".

Michael's plan fails, and when Vito realises that his execution is a set-up, he orders Vinnie to kill Michael. Vinnie shoots Gina in what appears to be an accident. Vito is arrested for ordering Michael's execution. As Frank and Michael mourn Gina's apparent death in the back of her ambulance, it is revealed that her death was faked as well, and that Vinnie and Gina were also involved with the FBI as a back-up plan. Gina confronts Michael about a picture her friend secretly took, where he kisses a waitress. Michael reveals it was a part of his mobster identity, "Mickey Blue Eyes", and that her father was there the entire time, ensuring no infidelity occurred. The couple reunite.

== Cast ==
- Hugh Grant as Michael Felgate
- James Caan as Frank Vitale
- Jeanne Tripplehorn as Gina Vitale
- Burt Young as Vito Graziosi
- James Fox as Philip Cromwell
- Joe Viterelli as Vinnie D'Agostino
- Gerry Becker as FBI Agent Bob Connell
- Maddie Corman as Carol
- Tony Darrow as Angelo
- Paul Lazar as Ritchie Vitale
- Vincent Pastore as Al
- Frank Pellegrino as Sante
- Scott Thompson as FBI Agent Lewis
- John Ventimiglia as Johnny Graziosi
- Tony Sirico as First Risolli Man
- Margaret Devine as Helen
- Beatrice Winde as Mrs. Horton
- Mark Margolis as Gene Morganson
- Aida Turturro as Italian Waitress
- Joseph R. Gannascoli as Jimmy, Gina's Doorman

== Production ==
On November 4, 1997, Hugh Grant was announced as a cast member of the film, with production taking place in New York City in 1998 including in Manhattan, in Central Park and at Silvercup Studios. Producer Elizabeth Hurley was Hugh Grant's girlfriend at the time.

The film was originally set to be released internationally by PolyGram Filmed Entertainment, through a financing agreement with one of the film's producers Castle Rock Entertainment, but it ended up being released by Universal Pictures International instead owing to PolyGram being folded into Universal in 1999. This is one of a handful of films, and among the last, until 2007, to be self-released by Universal internationally, and shortly afterwards, the theatrical distribution arm was merged into United International Pictures.

== Reception ==
=== Box office ===
The film earned $10.2 million in its opening weekend. It went on to gross $33.9 million in the United States and a total of $54.3 million worldwide. According to the Los Angeles Times the film was a "marginal money loser".

=== Critical response ===
On Rotten Tomatoes, the film holds an approval rating of 45% based on 78 reviews, with an average rating of 5.3/10. The site's critics consensus states: "High-brow humorists doing low-brow humor never hit their stride." At Metacritic, the film has a weighted average score of 49 out of 100, based on 30 critics, indicating "mixed or average reviews". Audiences polled by CinemaScore gave the film an average grade of "B−" on an A+ to F scale.

== Links to The Sopranos ==
The film is notable for the number of actors who would go on to appear in the HBO television series, The Sopranos, including:

- Tony Sirico - Paulie Gualtieri
- John Ventimiglia - Artie Bucco
- Vincent Pastore - Sal "Big Pussy" Bonpensiero
- Aida Turturro - Janice Soprano
- Frank Pellegrino - Bureau Chief Frank Cubitoso
- Joseph R. Gannascoli - Vito Spatafore
- Burt Young - Robert "Bobby" Baccalieri, Sr.
- Tony Darrow - Lawrence "Larry Boy" Barese
- Melissa Marsala - Kelly Aprile

The film is mentioned in the Season 2 Sopranos episode "D-Girl", when Amy Safir explains to Christopher Moltisanti that there is no longer a demand for mob-related scripts because of the relative box-office failure of this contemporary film.

== See also ==
- Vincent Alo, a real-life gangster known as "Jimmy Blue Eyes"
