= Tony Darrow =

American actor

- Born: Anthony Borgese; October 1, 1938 (age 88); East New York, Brooklyn, New York, U.S.
- Occupation: Actor

Anthony Borgese (born October 1, 1938), better known by his stage name Tony Darrow, is an American actor. He is known for his roles in Goodfellas, Bullets Over Broadway, The Sopranos, and others.

== Early life ==
Darrow was born and raised in East New York, Brooklyn. As a teenager, he gravitated towards show business, entering and winning talent shows while working odd jobs.

== Career ==
After ten years of singing in nightclubs, Darrow received an offer to appear in Street Trash in which he played a mobster. Several months after Street Trash, Darrow was contacted by the film director Martin Scorsese. It turned out that Scorsese had seen Street Trash and wanted him to audition for a role in Goodfellas. He was successful and was cast as the owner of the Bamboo Lounge, Sonny. Darrow was also in the Woody Allen films Bullets over Broadway, Mighty Aphrodite, Deconstructing Harry, Small Time Crooks and Sweet and Lowdown.

In 1999, Darrow played a large role in Analyze This with Robert De Niro and Billy Crystal. Later the same year, he appeared in Mickey Blue Eyes with Hugh Grant and secured another role as mobster Larry Barese in the HBO hit series The Sopranos (1999–2007). More recently, Darrow starred in the independent film Lynch Mob.

== Personal life ==
In June 2009, Darrow was charged with extortion in a 2004 incident. Along with Gambino crime family soldier Joseph "Joey Boy" Orlando and associate Giovanni "Johnny" Monteleone, Darrow was accused of ordering the maiming of a man in Monticello, New York, who owed money to a loan shark. Darrow and Orlando both pleaded guilty in federal court to these charges in February 2011, in exchange for a sentence of up to 33 months. However, Monteleone cooperated with the FBI. At sentencing, Darrow's attorney successfully argued that Darrow's history of community service, medical condition, and lack of prior criminal history warranted a sentence of house arrest, followed by a period of probation. Orlando was sentenced to 51 months in prison and Darrow received six months of house arrest.

== Filmography ==
=== Film ===
Year	Title	Role	Notes
1987	Street Trash	Nick Duran	
1990	Goodfellas	Sonny Bunz	
1994	Men Lie	Hot Dog Customer	
1994	Bullets Over Broadway	Aldo	
1994	Who Do I Gotta Kill?	Tony Bando	
1995	Mighty Aphrodite	Boxing Trainer	
1997	The North End	Nunzio	
1997	Deconstructing Harry	Camera Operator	
1998	Celebrity	Moving Man in Loft	
1999	Analyze This	Moony	
1999	Mickey Blue Eyes	Angelo	
1999	Sweet and Lowdown	Ben	
2000	Small Time Crooks	Tommy	
2003	Crooked Lines	Jimmy Pico	
2005	Searching for Bobby D	Ralph Argano	
2009	Lynch Mob	Boss Giavanni	
2010	One Angry Man	Bobby	
2011	Kill the Irishman	Mikey Mendarolo	
2013	Once Upon a Time in Brooklyn	Patsy Pirati	
2014	Friends and Romans	Frankie Fusso	
2014	Mafia Heaven	Stevie Matzoball	
2019	The Brawler	Tommy	
2019	Offstage Elements	Carlo Capozzoli	
2021	Made in Chinatown	Al Capella	
2022	Killin Smallz	Tony	
2022	Micki	Pop	
2022	Desert Dick	Antonio Vereterratucci	
2023	The Families Feud	Nicky Knuckles	

=== Television ===
Year	Title	Role	Notes
1991–2002	Law & Order	Various roles	3 episodes
1992	Teamster Boss: The Jackie Presser Story	Nardi	Television film
1993	The Good Policeman	Sal Rubino	Television film
1994	New York Undercover	Vinnie	Episode: "Garbage"
1995	The Wright Verdicts	Alberto Costanza	Episode: "Sins of the Father"
1996	Swift Justice	Vietor	6 episodes
1997	Dellaventura	Victor	Episode: "Dreamers"
1999–2007	The Sopranos	Larry Barese	15 episodes
2003	Last Laugh	Uptown Donnie	Television film
2012	Person of Interest	Caparelli	Episode: "Flesh and Blood"
2017	The Uncle Gerry Show	Bobby Rocco	Television film
2021–present	Gravesend	The Underboss	6 episodes
