= Anthony Mongiello =

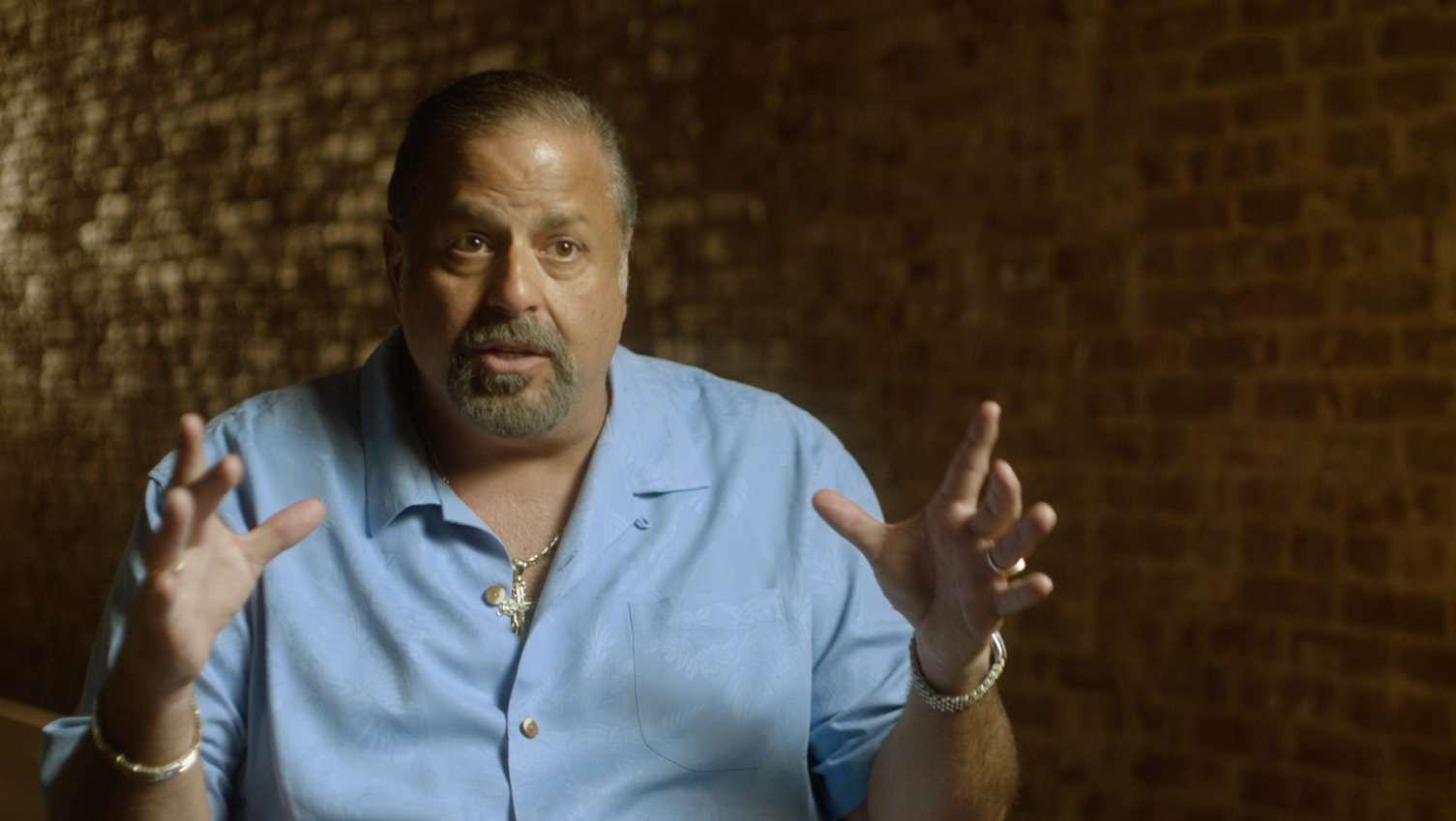
- Born: Bensonhurst, Brooklyn, New York, U.S.
- Organization: Formaggio Cheese
- Known for: 1987 method patent for stuffed crust pizza

Anthony Mongiello is an Italian-American food product inventor and founder of Formaggio Cheese.

== Early life ==
Mongiello was born in Bensonhurst, Brooklyn, near Lenny's Pizzeria. He comes from a lineage of food product innovators. His grandfather, Lorenzo Mongiello, a tinsmith who immigrated from Italy, invented the metal tapered ricotta cheese can in 1925. His father, Angelo Mongiello Sr., is known for inventing an automated mozzarella-molding machine.

== Career ==
Mongiello first conceived the idea for stuffed crust in 1982 at age 18 while experimenting with dough balls in his girlfriend's kitchen. Later, in 1987, he received a method patent, titled Method of Making a Pizza for stuffed crust pizza.

In the late 1980s and early 1990s, Mongiello sent his patent to major pizza chains, including Pizza Hut, in an effort to license the concept. He was told Pizza Hut was reviewing the patent and considering a business arrangement. In 1995, Pizza Hut launched a $45 million advertising campaign for its "Stuffed Crust Pizza" featuring Donald Trump.

In response, the Mongiello family retained attorney Paul Sutton, who filed a $1 billion patent infringement lawsuit in 1998.

In Mongiello v. Pizza Hut, U.S. District Judge Eugene Nickerson granted summary judgment in favor of Pizza Hut. He ruled that the company did not commit infringement because Mongiello held a method patent rather than a product patent, and Pizza Hut used a different method. Mongiello did not appeal the decision, later citing the high cost of an appeal as a barrier.

As of 2026, Mongiello runs and owns Formaggio Cheese, an Italian cheese product and specialty items manufacturer based in Hurleyville, New York. Mongiello has received awards at the Wisconsin Cheese Makers Association's World Cheese Competition and WCMA's United States Cheese Championship. Previously, Mongiello has hosted a cooking show Kings In The Kitchen broadcast in New York and Pennsylvania.

== In popular culture ==
Mongiello's story is the subject of the 2023 crime docudrama feature film Stolen Dough, directed by Stefano Da Frè and produced by Laura Pellegrini.

The film depicts a David vs. Goliath narrative through archival footage, interviews, and dramatized recreations of Mongiello's Brooklyn upbringing and legal battle. Although initially hesitant to participate, Mongiello ultimately agreed to the project after extended collaborations with the filmmakers. In one interview, Da Fre recalls that "the film getting made was challenging… Anthony wanted to ensure that the filmmaker telling his story had a rich and nuanced understanding of his patent."

Stolen Dough received a grant from the Russo Brothers Italian American Film Forum, in association with the National Italian American Foundation, and the Italian Sons and Daughters of America.

The film received positive reviews. Gordon Shelley of Influx Magazine cited Mongiello's authenticity as a strong point: "As Mongiello recounts the events leading up to the climactic legal outcome, he is sincere and likeable. But most importantly, he is believable." Another reviewer from Independent Movie Review described the film as "a concise, gripping narrative that unfolds the layers of corporate betrayal, legal battles, and Anthony's unwavering fight to preserve his idea and legacy."

Apple TV+ premiered Stolen Dough on its international streaming platform in January 2024.

In 2026, Mongiello and his daughter Anna starred in a concept TV pilot called A Slice of the Family Business, directed by Stefano Da Frè and produced by Laura Pellegrini. The pilot, which premiered at the 24th annual Garden State Film Festival, is currently being developed by Netflix Italia.
