= Yard Kings =

2020 British short film

- Directed by: Vasco Alexandre
- Written by: Vasco Alexandre
- Produced by: Billy King
- Starring: Elle Atkinson; David Price; Caroline Lazarus; Jermaine Ricketts
- Cinematography: Jakub Rogala
- Edited by: Aiden Tobin
- Music by: Elliot Herrington
- Production companies: Bricks and Water Creative
- Release date: 2020
- Running time: 15min
- Country: United Kingdom
- Language: English

Yard Kings is a 2020 British short film written and directed by Vasco Alexandre and produced by Billy King. It stars Elle Atkinson, David Price, Jermaine Ricketts and Caroline Lazarus.

The film is inspired by the British social realism tradition, which depicts people's struggle when living in poverty and exposed to various forms of violence.

== Synopsis ==
Ellie, a 9-year-old girl from a violent home, tries to escape her harsh reality by taking refuge in a scrapyard nearby with her friend Pete. Her way of spending her time is to build a "house" where she can dream of another existence.

== Cast ==
- David Price as Pete
- Elle Atkinson as Ellie
- Jermaine Ricketts as Alfie
- Caroline Lazarus as Lisa

== Accolades ==
Yard Kings has received international nominations and awards, including a Giornate Della Luce Award at the Ca' Foscari Short Film Festival, two Royal Television Society Awards - the oldest television society in the world with Charles, Prince of Wales as patron; and eight FFTG awards.

Competition	Category	Recipient(s)	Result
Royal Television Society	Student London Television Award - Best-Scripted Film, 2021	Vasco Alexandre & Billy King	Winner
Royal Television Society	Student Television Award - Best Sound Design, 2021	Zuzanna Pencak	Winner
FFTG Awards	Best Director, 2021	Vasco Alexandre	Winner
FFTG Awards	Best Cinematography, 2021	Jakub Rogala	Winner
FFTG Awards	Jury Choice for Best Debut Short Film 2021	Vasco Alexandre & Billy King	Winner
FFTG Awards	Best Screenplay, 2021	Vasco Alexandre	Winner
FFTG Awards	Best Sound, 2021	Zuzanna Pencak	Winner
FFTG Awards	Best Actor, 2021	David Price	Winner
FFTG Awards	Best Actress, 2021	Elle Atkinson	Winner
Ca'Foscari Short Film Festival	Premio Giornate Della Luce, 2021	Jakub Rogala	Winner
Curtas Vila do Conde International Film Festival	Take One! Award, 2021	Vasco Alexandre & Billy King	Nominee
European Cinematography Awards	Best Student Director, 2021	Vasco Alexandre	Winner
In the Palace International Short Film Festival	Best Student Film, 2021	Vasco Alexandre & Billy King	Nominee
