= Season finale (disambiguation) =

A Season finale is the final episode of a season of a television program

Season finale may also refer to:

- "Season Finale" (Clone High), a 2003 episode of Clone High
- Season Finale (book), 2007 book written by Suzanne Daniels and Cynthia Littleton
- "Season Finale" (South Park), a 2019 episode of South Park

== See also ==
- Series finale
