= Cathy Moriarty =

American actress (born 1960)

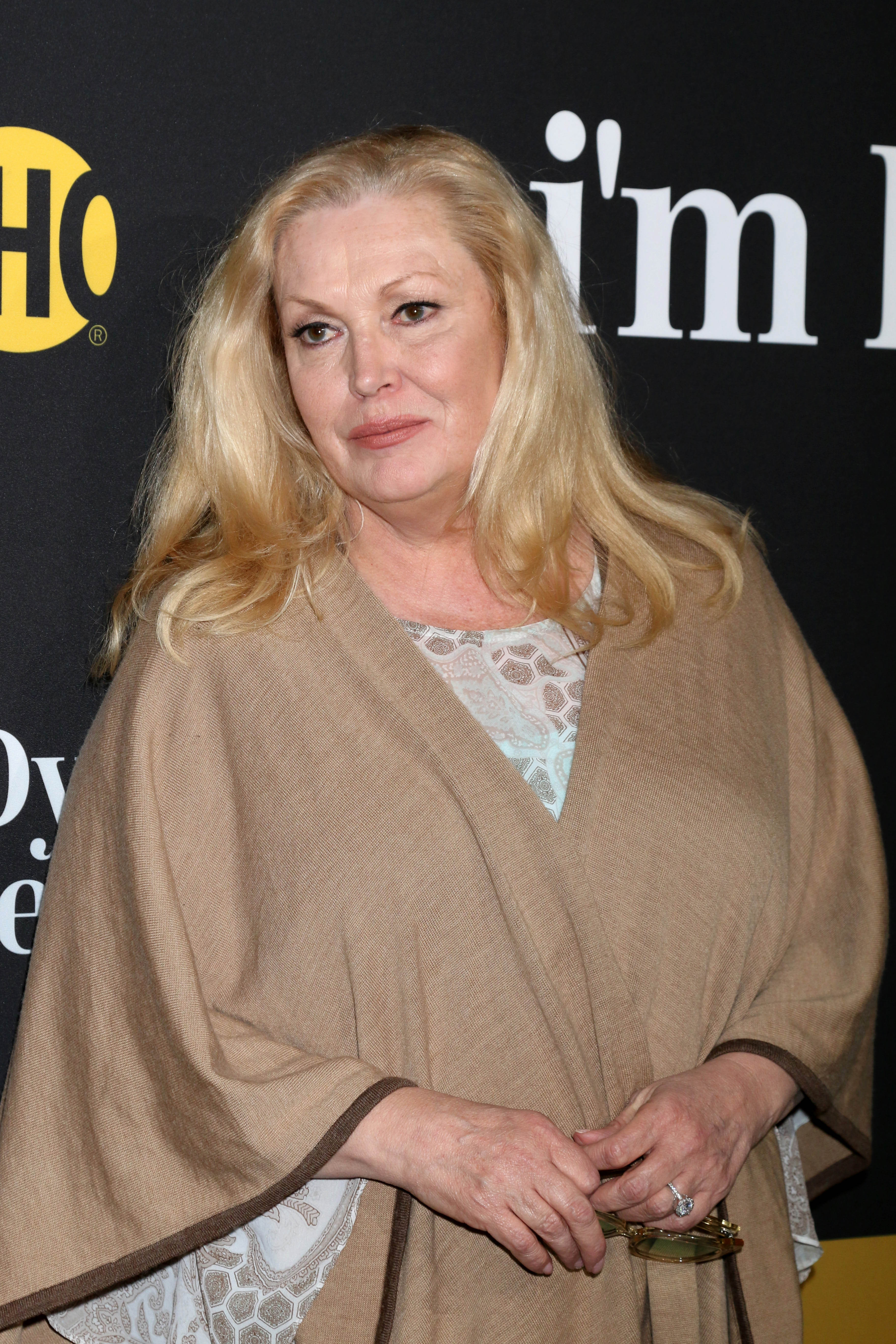
- Moriarty in 2017
- Born: November 29, 1960 (age 65); New York City, New York, U.S.
- Other name: Cathy Moriarty-Gentile
- Citizenship: United States; Ireland
- Occupation: Actress
- Years active: 1980–present
- Spouses: Carmine D'Anna (m. 1981; div. 1992) Joseph Gentile (m. 1999)
- Partners: Richie Palmer (1994–1997)
- Children: 3

Cathy Moriarty (born November 29, 1960) is an American actress whose career spans five decades. Born in The Bronx borough of New York City and raised in Yonkers, New York, she made her acting debut opposite Robert De Niro in Martin Scorsese's Raging Bull (1980), for which she received nominations for the Academy Award for Best Supporting Actress, the Golden Globe Award for Best Supporting Actress – Motion Picture, and the British Academy Film Award.

Throughout her career, she has worked with a number of prolific directors including Martin Scorsese, Sidney Lumet, Ivan Reitman, Harold Ramis, James Mangold, and Richard Ayoade. She has starred in numerous leading and supporting roles in a variety of films ranging from independent film features to major film studio productions across many genres. Her film appearances include Neighbors (1981), White of the Eye (1987), Kindergarten Cop (1990), Soapdish (1991), Matinee (1993), Casper (1995), Cop Land (1997), But I’m a Cheerleader (1999), Analyze That (2002), The Bounty Hunter (2010), The Double (2013), and Patti Cake$ (2017). The films in which she has appeared have collectively grossed over $1 billion worldwide.

Moriarty has also starred in numerous television series including Tales from the Crypt (1992), Hey Arnold! (1997–1999), Law & Order (2001), Law & Order: Special Victims Unit (2005–2014), Law & Order: Criminal Intent (2010), I'm Dying Up Here (2017), This Is Us (2018), The Assassination of Gianni Versace: American Crime Story (2018), City on a Hill (2019), and HouseBroken (2021).

Moriarty works as an activist for the autistic community and is the national spokesperson for Autism United. She is also an advocate of both Autism Speaks and the autism rights movement.

== Early life ==
Moriarty was born November 29, 1960, in The Bronx borough of New York City, the third of seven children born to Irish Catholic immigrants Catherine, a homemaker, and John Moriarty, a warehouse worker. Moriarty's father was from Faha, County Kerry, while her mother was from Ballineen in County Cork.

She was raised in Yonkers, New York, where she attended Lincoln High School. When she was 18 years old, her friends urged her to enter a bathing-beauty contest at a local bar:

So, I go in there, and my knees are shaking, and I'm breaking out in goose bumps 'cause I'm embarrassed and cold. All these guys are whistling and stuff. Then all of a sudden the emcee announces I won first prize, and I say, "Hey, this is really funny". So this Italian guy comes up and asks if he can take my picture and I say, "Sure, go ahead", 'cause he's gonna take it anyway. And whad'd'ya know, this same guy calls me three weeks later, says his name is Joe Pesci and asks if I'd like to test for a part in this movie about a boxer named Jake LaMotta.

== Career ==
=== 1980s ===
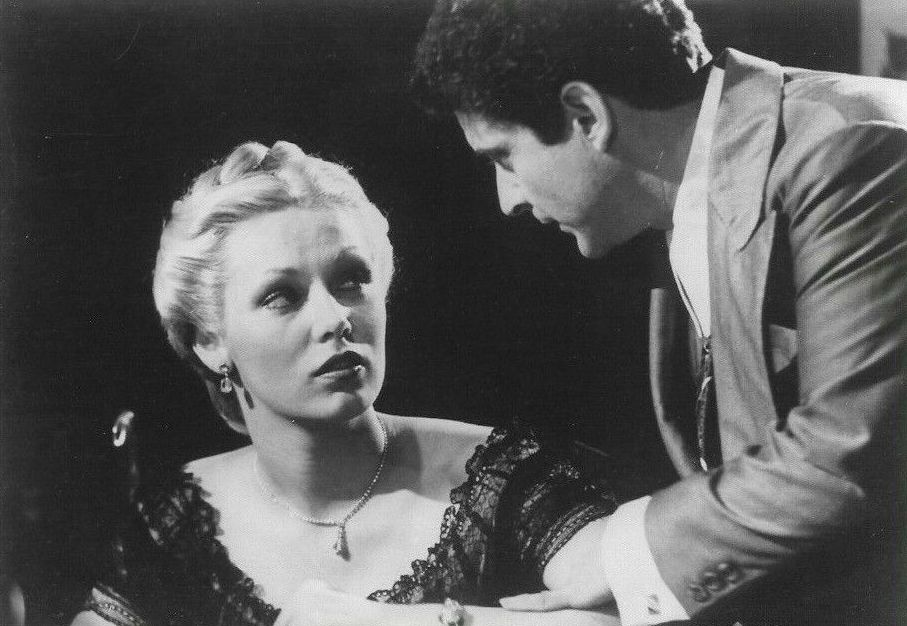
Moriarty with co-star Joe Pesci on the set of Raging Bull

Moriarty made her film debut in Martin Scorsese's Raging Bull (1980), as Vikki LaMotta, the wife of boxer Jake (Robert De Niro). She was nominated for the Academy Award for Best Supporting Actress. Later that year, Moriarty played John Belushi's destructive, sultry neighbor in Neighbors, a film adaptation of Thomas Berger's novel of the same name. In 1982, she was severely injured in an automobile accident and required back surgery.

I can only say that nobody likes an overnight success in this town. I went for a lot of interviews, auditions and even cattle calls. I tried for parts and attended meetings, but it seemed I wasn't right for any of the roles I wanted. And the parts I was offered didn't appeal to me. So I paid my dues, studying acting and losing my Yonkers accent. And oh yes, I cried an awful lot.

In 1985, Moriarty agreed to co-star with Jack Nicholson in The Two Jakes. However, after one day of shooting its production halted. Although the film was eventually released in 1990, Moriarty was no longer connected with the production. Moriarty returned to acting in 1987. Her first role since Neighbors was in the British thriller film White of the Eye, in which Moriarty played the wife of David Keith's character. Two years later, she appeared in the CBS series Wiseguy.

=== 1990s ===
Moriarty began the decade with major roles in the thriller film Burndown, Arnold Schwarzenegger's Kindergarten Cop and the soap opera parody Soapdish. She also appeared in the musical drama The Mambo Kings and the horror anthology HBO series Tales from the Crypt, where Moriarty's performance earned her a Best Actress in a Dramatic Series CableACE Award. Her last performance of the year was a hard-as-nails prostitute in the screwball comedy film, The Gun in Betty Lou's Handbag. In 1993, Moriarty starred as John Goodman's wisecracking girlfriend and a film goddess in Joe Dante's period comedy Matinee, and had supporting roles in the comedies Another Stakeout (the sequel of 1987's Stakeout) and Me and the Kid. The following year, she guest-starred as half of the husband-wife con team in Universal's film Another Midnight Run. The actress' next role was the flirty barfly in Peter Medak's adventure film, Pontiac Moon (1994).

Moriarty played Lois opposite Debra Winger and Billy Crystal in the romantic comedy Forget Paris (1995), followed by the vindictive Carrigan Crittenden in the live action film Casper. Shortly afterwards she starred with Andrew Dice Clay in the CBS series Bless This House. That year Moriarty also played opposite Angelina Jolie as Hedy Burress's mother in Foxfire, the film adaptation of Joyce Carol Oates' novel. The next year, she played the mother of a successful boxer in Opposite Corners; the mother of two sons (one a police officer and the other a crack addict) in A Brother's Kiss; a former exotic dancer and Brad Hunt's aunt in Dream with the Fishes; Mary Stuart Masterson and Evan Rachel Wood's seriously ill, alcoholic mother in Digging to China; Michael Rapaport's aunt in Cop Land and Alyssa Milano's mother in the Robert Downey Sr. film Hugo Pool.

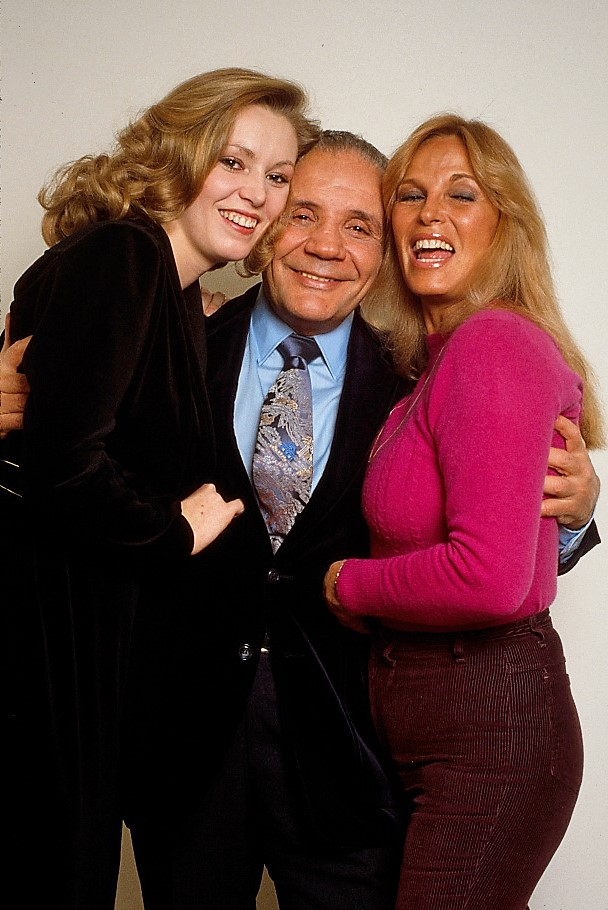
Moriarty (left), prizefighter Jake LaMotta, and his wife Vikki LaMotta, whom Moriarty played in the film Raging Bull, seen in 1980

Moriarty voiced characters in the animated TV series Stories from My Childhood and the popular children's series Recess. Other appearances included Hilary Duff's aunt, who is also a witch, in the film Casper Meets Wendy, Randy Quaid's wife in the film P.U.N.K.S., and Sharon Stone's best friend in the Sidney Lumet film Gloria (a 1999 remake of the 1980 film written and directed by John Cassavetes). Roles followed in Antonio Banderas’s Crazy in Alabama, a film adaptation of Mark Childress's 1993 novel of the same name; New Waterford Girl, a Canadian comedy-drama, and the satirical film But I'm a Cheerleader. Moriarty played an FBI agent in Red Team, an abusive adoptive mother in the family film Prince of Central Park and a woman who fears death in Next Stop, Eternity. Other roles included a widow suspected of killing her husband on Law & Order and a controlling mother on Law & Order: Special Victims Unit. She also starred as crime boss Patti LoPresti in the Mafia comedy film Analyze That, the sequel to 1999's Analyze This, and her third collaboration with De Niro.

=== 2000s ===
Consciously, I like to take on movies that have a message of authenticity. I like to create a character close to life, where it's real.

Following Analyze That, Moriarty took a break from acting to raise her children. In 2010, she returned to the big screen to play a bookie who sends two thugs to kill the main characters (Jennifer Aniston and Gerard Butler) in the romantic-action-comedy film The Bounty Hunter. On July 18, 2010, the Long Island International Film Expo honored the actress with its Long Island Creative Achievement Award. Shortly afterwards, she guest-starred as Annalisa Gentili on Law & Order: Criminal Intent.

=== 2010–present ===
In 2013, she played Armand Assante's wife in Once Upon a Time in Brooklyn and a sarcastic waitress in the black comedy, The Double opposite Jesse Eisenberg and Mia Wasikowska. She returned to Law & Order: Special Victims Unit as Lieutenant Toni Howard for two episodes: season 14's "Poisoned Motive" and season 15's "Amaro's One-Eighty".

Moriarty made an appearance as Michael Pitt's bitter, estranged mother in the crime drama Rob the Mob. The same year she appeared as the co-owner of a house who shares a dark secret in Deborah Twiss's psychological thriller A Cry from Within and the title character in Ante Novakovic's short film, Tammy, about a mother-son relationship which evolves over the course of a Sunday visit. Moriarty's performance earned a nomination for Best Actress at the Jersey Shore Shorts Film Festival. Since then, Moriarty has regularly performed in both film and on television, with major roles in Patti Cake$, an official selection of the Sundance Film Festival and Toronto International Film Festival, as well as the NBC series This Is Us, the Ryan Murphy series American Crime Story, the Showtime series I'm Dying Up Here, and City on a Hill.

== Personal life ==
In 1981, Moriarty met body shop manager Carmine D'Anna in Yonkers, in Yonkers, married, and moved into a home in Malibu, California. On April 2, 1992, it was reported that Moriarty and D'Anna were divorcing and D'Anna sought $1 million under California's community property laws.

Moriarty owns the Mulberry Street Pizzeria restaurant chain with co-owner Richie Palmer, to whom she was briefly engaged. The couple separated when Palmer began dating Raquel Welch in October 1997, but the two remained business partners. Moriarty and Palmer continue to own Mulberry Street Pizzeria together, with four locations in Southern California and one in Las Vegas.

On August 28, 1999, Moriarty and Joseph Gentile married on Long Island. They have three children.

== Filmography ==
=== Film ===
Year	Title	Role	Notes
1980	Raging Bull	Vikki LaMotta	See awards section
1981	Neighbors	Ramona Zeck	
1987	White of the Eye	Joan White	
1990	Kindergarten Cop	Jillian	
1990	Burndown	Patti Smart	
1991	Soapdish	Montana Moorehead / Nurse Nan	
1992	The Mambo Kings	Lanna Lake	
1992	The Gun in Betty Lou's Handbag	Reba Bush	
1993	Matinee	Ruth Corday / Carole	
1993	Another Stakeout	Luella "Lu" Delano	
1993	Me and the Kid	Rose	
1994	Pontiac Moon	Lorraine	
1995	Forget Paris	Lois	
1995	Casper	Catherine "Carrigan" Crittenden	
1996	Foxfire	Martha Wirtz	
1997	Opposite Corners	Kathy Donatello	
1997	A Brother's Kiss	Doreen	
1997	Dream with the Fishes	Aunt Elise	
1997	Digging to China	Mrs. Frankovitz	
1997	Cop Land	Rose Donlan	
1997	Hugo Pool	Minerva	
1998	Casper Meets Wendy	Gert	Video
1998	Welcome to Hollywood	Herself	Cameo; Mockumentary
1999	P.U.N.K.S.	Mrs. Utley	
1999	Crazy in Alabama	Earlene Bullis	
1999	But I'm a Cheerleader	Mary Brown	
1999	Gloria	Diane	
1999	New Waterford Girl	Midge Benzoa	
2000	Red Team	Stephanie Dobson	See awards section
2000	Prince of Central Park	Mrs. Ardis	
2001	Lady and the Tramp II: Scamp's Adventure	Ruby (voice)	Video
2002	Analyze That	Patti LoPresti	
2010	The Bounty Hunter	Irene	
2013	Once Upon a Time in Brooklyn	Sarah Baldano	
2013	The Double	Kiki	
2013	Tammy	Tammy	Short film
2014	The Story of Milo & Annie	Lynda	
2014	A Cry from Within	Alice	
2014	Rob the Mob	Constance Uva	
2017	Patti Cake$	Nana	
2021	Last Call	Mrs. C.	
2021	Flinch	Gloria Doyle	
2024	Line of Fire	Marie	Short film

=== Television ===
Year	Title	Role	Notes
1989	Wiseguy	Denise	Episode: "Reunion"
1992	Tales from the Crypt	Alison Peters	Episode: "Séance"; See awards section
1994	Another Midnight Run	Helen Bishop	TV film
1995	Bless This House	Alice Clayton	Main role
1995	Bump in the Night	Destructette (voice)	
1996–1999	Jumanji	Jeanna (voice)	2 episodes
1997–1999	Hey Arnold!	Tish Wittenberg (voice)	3 episodes
1998	Recess	Dr. Fitzenberg (voice)	Episode: "Kids in the Mist"
2000	The Hunger	Maris	Episode: "Bottle of Smoke"
2001	Law & Order	Lorraine Corbin	Episode: "For Love or Money"
2005	Law & Order: Special Victims Unit	Denise Eldridge	Episode: "Intoxicated"
2010	Law & Order: Criminal Intent	Annalisa Gentillo	2 episodes
2013	Law & Order: Special Victims Unit	Lieutenant Toni Howard	
2014	Law & Order: Special Victims Unit	Captain Toni Howard	
2017	I'm Dying Up Here	Angie Apuzzo	Episode: "Pilot"
2018	This Is Us	The Super	Episode: "Clooney"
2018	The Assassination of Gianni Versace: American Crime Story	Vivian Oliva	2 episodes
2019	City on a Hill	Dottie Ryan	4 episodes
2020	Into the Arms of Danger	Mamma	TV film
2021	HouseBroken	Nancy (voice)	
2025	Elsbeth	Marie Drabowski	season 3 episode 3 "Good Grief"

== Awards and nominations ==
Year	Work	Award	Category	Result
1981	Raging Bull	Academy Award	Best Supporting Actress	Nominated
1981	Raging Bull	National Society of Film Critics Awards	Best Supporting Actress	Nominated
1981	Raging Bull	Golden Globe Award	Best Supporting Actress	Nominated
1981	Raging Bull	Golden Globe Award	New Star of the Year - Actress	Nominated
1982	Raging Bull	BAFTA Film Award	Most Promising Newcomer to Leading Film Roles	Nominated
1992	Soapdish	American Comedy Awards	Funniest Supporting Actress in a Motion Picture	Nominated
1993	Tales from the Crypt	CableACE Award	Best Actress in a Dramatic Series	Won
2001	Red Team	DVD Exclusive Awards	Best Actress	Nominated
2010	Honoree	Long Island Creative Achievement Award	Long Island International Film Expo	Won
