= Swift Justice =

American television program

- Genre: Detective drama
- Created by: Dick Wolf; Richard Albarino
- Starring: James McCaffrey; Gary Dourdan; Len Cariou
- Composer: Rick Marotta
- Country of origin: United States
- Original language: English
- No. of seasons: 1
- No. of episodes: 13

Production
- Executive producer: Dick Wolf
- Production location: New York City
- Camera setup: Single-camera
- Running time: 42 minutes
- Production companies: Wolf Films; Universal Television

Original release
- Network: UPN
- Release: March 13 – July 17, 1996

Swift Justice is an American detective drama television series created by Dick Wolf and Richard Albarino. It aired for one season on United Paramount Network (UPN) from March 13 to July 17, 1996. It follows former Navy SEAL Mac Swift (James McCaffrey), a private investigator who was fired from the New York City Police Department. He receives support from his former partner Detective Randall Patterson (Gary Dourdan) and his father Al Swift (Len Cariou). Produced on a limited budget, episodes were filmed on location in New York.

Critics noted Swift Justice's emphasis on violence, specifically in the pilot episode's opening sequence, comparing it to the crime drama The Equalizer (1985–1989) and the 1988 film Die Hard. UPN canceled the program after receiving complaints from viewers, advertisers, and critics of its violent scenes; Wolf considered the cancellation a mistake due to the show's good ratings. The series was praised for its visuals and McCaffrey's performance, but criticized as being either too violent or formulaic.

== Premise and characters ==
A detective drama, Swift Justice follows Mac Swift (James McCaffrey), a former United States Navy SEAL who joins the New York City Police Department (NYPD). He is aided by his best friend and partner, Detective Randall Patterson (Gary Dourdan), but is frequently reprimanded by his police sergeant father Al Swift (Len Cariou) and other superiors, including Andrew Coffin (Giancarlo Esposito). The pilot episode focuses on Mac's attempts to arrest a man (Skipp Sudduth) who runs a prostitution ring as part of a honey trap involving extortion, drugs, and credit card fraud. For the case, he collaborates with a prostitute, Annie (Kim Dickens), and becomes romantically involved with her. She turned to the profession to pay for her college tuition and her mother's nursing home bills. When Annie is murdered, Mac's behavior becomes increasingly erratic and violent, leading to his termination from the police department at the end of the pilot.

In subsequent episodes, Mac works as a private investigator who assists those "denied [help] because of the rules of conventional law enforcement." He helps people by improving their chances against criminals in court, rather than by vigilantism. Portrayed as experienced with computers, Mac is financially stable due to royalty payments from software he has developed. He sets up an email address to receive messages from his clients. According to a publicity note from United Paramount Network (UPN), Mac relies on "technology, intellect, charisma[,] and muscle" to solve cases. The network promoted the character as "a true crime fighter of the technology-driven 90's." Throughout the season, Randall provides information about cases to Mac. Al is demoted from being a beat officer to working at a desk.

Storylines include a rock singer who is denied a divorce from her abusive husband, a woman whose son is kidnapped by her ex-husband, and a man who ties up and tortures his victims by driving them with golf balls. Guest appearances include Jennifer Garner, Drea de Matteo, and Ice-T. Many commentators noted the show's use of violence, particularly that the pilot's opening sequence involves nine deaths. Despite its frequent inclusion of violent scenes, the show does not show blood or gore. Critics compared the violence in Swift Justice to the crime drama The Equalizer and the 1988 action movie Die Hard, and the Orlando Sentinel's Hal Boedeker identified it as an "urban western." Co-creator and executive producer Dick Wolf likened the series to "Batman without the mask", and characterized its tone as politically incorrect. He based Mac on the gunfighter Paladin from Have Gun – Will Travel and compared his friendship with Randall to Martin Riggs' partnership with Roger Murtaugh in the Lethal Weapon films.

== Production and broadcast history ==
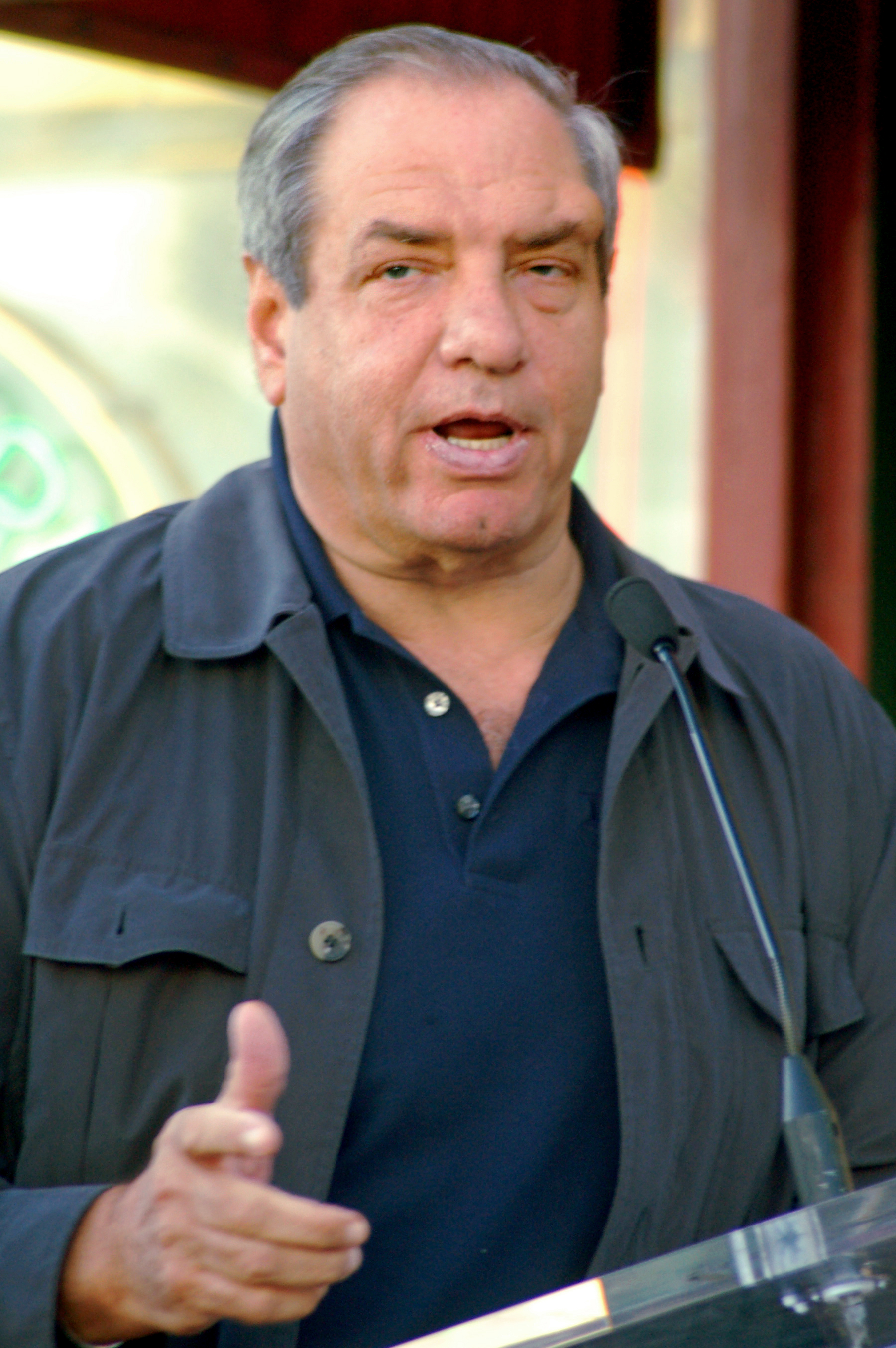
Dick Wolf was the co-creator and executive producer of Swift Justice.

Produced by Wolf Films in association with Universal Television, Swift Justice was created by Wolf and Richard Albarino. According to New York's Maureen Callahan, the episodes, shot on location in New York, were low budget productions. During filming, Jean-Claude La Marre, who guest starred as a hustler, was nearly arrested by a police officer. La Marre accused him of racial profiling. Representatives from Swift Justice and the NYPD did not comment on the incident. Rick Marotta produced the music, which Variety's Todd Everett described as having a good synthesizer- and percussion-based sound. Swift Justice was the first time that Gary Glasberg wrote for an hour-long television program. Referring to the experience as his "big break", he would later be a showrunner for the police procedural NCIS.

Swift Justice was part of UPN's "aggressive new spring schedule" that expanded the network's programming to three nights per week. Picked up as a mid-season replacement, the series was broadcast on Wednesday nights at 9:00 pm EST. Thirteen episodes aired between March and July 1996. The Rocky Mountain News' Dusty Saunders cited the series as an example of the network shifting toward action-adventure programming. Mediaweek's Scotty Dupree wrote that Swift Justice and The Sentinel were meant to attract a male audience, saying they were the only shows, aside from JAG, marketed to men on Wednesday nights. Wolf specified the target audiences of males as being aged 18 to 34.

Swift Justice's pilot episode was shown with a viewer advisory regarding its violence. During the show's broadcast, watchdog organizations and viewers were critical of the representation of violence on television. UPN canceled Swift Justice, Nowhere Man, Minor Adjustments, and The Paranormal Borderline, in favor of black sitcoms. The network decided to remove Swift Justice from its schedule following viewer and advertiser complaints about its violence. During a 2013 interview with the Academy of Television Arts & Sciences, Wolf referred to the decision to end Swift Justice as a "cancellation error", particularly since UPN did not have a drama with comparable ratings at the time. Following the show's cancellation, when Wolf was casting for the television productions Players and Exiled: A Law & Order Movie in the late 1990s, he again hired Ice-T, who has noted that Wolf often collaborated with the same actors.

== Episodes ==
| No. | Title | Directed by | Written by | Original release date | US viewers (millions) |
|---|---|---|---|---|---|
| 1 | "Out on a Limb" | Jace Alexander | Story by : Dick Wolf & David H. Balkan; Teleplay by : David H. Balkan | March 13, 1996 | 3.8 |
During an investigation on a man who orders prostitutes to steal their clients' credit card information, NYPD officer Mac Swift falls in love with one of the women. When she is murdered, Mac kills the mobster in response and is fired from the NYPD.
| 2 | "Swift Justice" | Jace Alexander | Richard Albarino & Dick Wolf | March 20, 1996 | 5.2 |
Mac helps a woman find her son who has been kidnapped by her ex-husband, and discovers he is a leader of a Neo-Nazi group.
| 3 | "Sex, Death and Rock 'n' Roll" | Frederick King Keller | Gary Glasberg | March 27, 1996 | 3.6 |
Randall Patterson asks Mac to help a friend who is denied a divorce from her husband.
| 4 | "Supernote" | Frederick King Keller | Jerry Patrick Brown | April 3, 1996 | 2.6 |
A federal agent hires Mac to find her partner last seen investigating counterfeit money.
| 5 | "Where Were You in '72?" | Oscar L. Costo | James M. Dale | April 10, 1996 | 3.0 |
Mac helps a former political activist locate a person trying to kill her.
| 6 | "Takin' Back the Street" | Lee Bonner | Sonny Gordon | April 24, 1996 | 3.1 |
Mac investigates the murder of a woman who attempted to organize her neighborhood against drug dealers.
| 7 | "No Holds Barred" | Frederick King Keller | Gary Glasberg | May 1, 1996 | 3.0 |
Mac gets involved in illegal cage fighting while trying to find a woman's missing boyfriend.
| 8 | "Horses" | Matthew Penn | Jonathan Robert Kaplan | May 8, 1996 | 2.3 |
While investigating the killing of a horse, Mac is confronted by a loan shark.
| 9 | "Bad Medicine" | Frederick King Keller | Bob Rogers | May 15, 1996 | 3.0 |
While investigating a scientist's death, Mac and Randall discover a pharmaceutical scam where a company destroyed clinical data to profit from a deadly drug.
| 10 | "Isaiah's Daughter" | Jesús Salvador Treviño | William Hasley | May 22, 1996 | 2.8 |
An Amish man travels to Manhattan to find his daughter and asks for Mac's assistance.
| 11 | "The Haze" | Frederick King Keller | Sonny Gordon | July 2, 1996 | 2.8 |
A woman hires Mac to find the person trying to kill her, but she forgets key details due to a drinking problem.
| 12 | "Stones" | N/A | Jerry Patrick Brown | July 10, 1996 | 2.8 |
Mac helps a girl on probation after her friends rob two million dollars of jewels from a professional thief.
| 13 | "Retribution" | Frederick King Keller | Mark Lisson | July 17, 1996 | 3.0 |
Mac and Randall reunite with a woman they helped escape from a serial killer. She has dreams the murderer will pursue her again in the near future.

== Critical reception ==
Critics praised Swift Justice for its visuals, although some criticized the storylines as unoriginal. Variety's Todd Everett and the Chicago Tribune's Steve Johnson found fault with the show for relying on clichés, but both enjoyed the look of the show. Everett wrote that Swift Justice was the most visually attractive program on UPN, and Johnson that it had "a visceral, close-to-the-streets feel." Judy Nichols of The Christian Science Monitor likewise commented on the "fast-moving action" and "spurts of breakneck-pace camera work." By contrast, The Boston Globe's Frederic M. Biddle felt the visuals alone could not carry the show, saying that they did not justify the frequent violence scenes. Biddle described the series as "utterly empty at its soul" underneath its "over the top in slick visuals."

James McCaffrey and his character received a positive response from critics. The New York Times' John O'Connor praised the show for characterizing him as an action hero with a sensitive side. People's Tom Gliatto and The Virginian-Pilot's Larry Bonko singled out McCaffrey for his handsomeness. Gliatto described him as "handsome, but neither too impressed nor too pretty to buy as an action lead", and Bonko called him attractively toughened. The Virginian-Pilot's Larry Bonko said casting him was a perfect choice.

The show's frequent use of violence was criticized. Panning the premise as unrealistic, Scott D. Pierce of the Deseret News summed up the series as "full of violence, questionable messages, violence and more violence." The San Francisco Chronicle's John Carman described Swift Justice as a "competent action show", but felt that "it isn't good enough to compensate for its excesses." Some commentators criticized the series' plot as generic. In their 2007 book Season Finale: The Unexpected Rise and Fall of The WB and UPN, Susanne Daniels and Cynthia Littleton dismissed Swift Justice as a "run-of-the-mill gumshoe drama." Hal Boedeker of the Orlando Sentinel referred to the show as "an unpleasant throwback to the 1980s." Howard Rosenberg, writing for the Los Angeles Times, was critical of the pilot episode for its plot holes, and Gliatto described the episodes as having "some of the dumbest villains in the annals of crime."
