= Confidence Game =

- Directed by: Deborah Twiss
- Written by: Deborah Twiss
- Produced by: Deborah Twiss; Donna McKenna; Sameer Thapar; Arun Kumar; Marc Jacobson; Heidi C. Bordogna; Kate Balandina
- Starring: Sean Young; Deborah Twiss; James McCaffrey; Steve S. Stanulis; Stefano Da Frè; Robert Clohessy; Brandon Tyler Jones; Shing Ka
- Cinematography: Alice Millar
- Edited by: Phyllis Housen
- Music by: Vivien Villani
- Production companies: Cobble Hill Films; Lola's Productions; Sebastien Film
- Release date: September 1, 2016
- Running time: 110 minutes
- Country: United States
- Language: English

Confidence Game is a 2016 American thriller film written and directed by Deborah Twiss. The film stars Sean Young, Deborah Twiss, James McCaffrey, and Steve Stanulis with Stefano Da Fre and Robert Clohessy in supporting roles.

== Premise ==
Sylvie (Young) runs a crime ring on Long Island and violently manipulates her minions to exact a deep revenge on the notoriously unethical film producer David (McCaffrey).

== Cast ==
- Sean Young as Sylvie
- Deborah Twiss as Jessica
- James McCaffrey as David
- Steve Stanulis as Michael
- Stefano Da Frè as Jingo
- Robert Clohessy as Anthony
- Brandon Tyler Jones as Carlos
- Shing Ka as Corey
- Bill Sorvino as Mack
- Joe Pallister as Vinnie
- Lawrence Whitener as Actor
- Gaetano Sciortino as Jean Luc
- Sydney McCann as Lola
- José André Sibaja as Waiter
- Jane Casserly as Ginger Porter
- Bruce Hermann as Connor
- Matthew McCann as Tommy
- Drew Henriksen as Joey
- Viktoria Tocca as herself
- Chase Hayden as Son
- Marc Lebowitz as Amir Kreshing
- Sophia Lebowitz as Receptionist

== Production ==
Principal photography took place in December 2014 and January 2015 in New York City, The Hamptons and Staten Island. Some scenes were shot in The Cutting Room in New York City.

== Release ==
Confidence Game was released on September 1, 2016.
