= Last Call (2021 film) =

- Film poster
- Directed by: Paolo Pilladi
- Screenplay by: Paolo Pilladi; Greg Lingo
- Story by: Greg Lingo; Michael Baughan; Billy Reilly
- Produced by: D.J. Dodd; Rob Simmons; Ante Novakovic; Paolo Pilladi
- Starring: Jeremy Piven; Taryn Manning; Zach McGowan; Jack McGee; Cathy Moriarty; Cheri Oteri; Jamie Kennedy; Bruce Dern
- Cinematography: George Gibson
- Edited by: Ethan Maniquis; Pete Talamo
- Music by: Jon Natchez
- Production companies: Future Proof Films; Goodie Goodie; JARS Media Group; Novakovic Bros.
- Distributed by: IFC Films; Cornell Ventures
- Release dates: March 19, 2021 (United States); March 29, 2021 (United Kingdom)
- Running time: 102 minutes
- Country: United States
- Language: English
- Box office: $264,961

Last Call is a 2021 comedy-drama film directed by Paolo Pilladi, who co-wrote the screenplay with Greg Lingo, based on a story by Greg Lingo, Michael Baughan and Billy Reilly. The film was originally titled Crabs in a Bucket. The film stars Jeremy Piven, Taryn Manning, Zach McGowan, Jamie Kennedy and Bruce Dern.

Last Call had a limited theatrical release in the United States on March 19, 2021, by IFC Films. However, due to the COVID-19 pandemic, it was simultaneously made available for streaming. The film was released separately in the United Kingdom on March 29, 2021.

== Plot ==
Mick (Jeremy Piven) is a local success story and Philadelphia real estate developer. He returns to his blue-collar hometown, fictional "Darby Heights"(based on Upper Darby, a suburb of West Philadelphia), for a funeral and is obligated to stay to ensure his parents’ struggling family business gets back on course.

In the meantime, he begins to grow closer to his childhood crush, Ali (Taryn Manning) while enduring constant ridicule from his old hometown crew. As Mick begins to reconnect with the neighborhood, he finds himself at a crossroads when forced to either raze or resurrect the family bar.

== Cast ==
- Jeremy Piven as Seamus 'Mick' McDougal
- Taryn Manning as Ali
- Zach McGowan as Laurence 'Dougal' McDougal Jr.
- Jack McGee as Laurence
- Cathy Moriarty as Mrs C.
- Cheri Oteri as Dr. Baba Brown
- Jamie Kennedy as 'Whitey'
- Bruce Dern as Coach
- Peter Patrikios as 'Digits'
- Jason James Richter as Saville
- Betsy Beutler as Carla
- Gary Pastore as Mr. Delvecchio
- Joseph Gannascoli as Charlie
- Robert Clohessy as Aidan
- Rob Hneleski as Big Guy
- Chris Kerson as Paddy
- Leticia Castillo as Melanie
- Paul Scheb as Shirt Stain (aka Grimace)
- Lauren Francesca as Morgan

== Production ==
Filming took place in September 2019 in Bayonne, New Jersey, with additional scenes shot in Upper Darby Township, Pennsylvania.
