= Hugo Pool =

1997 American film

- Hugo Pool film poster
- Directed by: Robert Downey Sr.
- Written by: Robert Downey Sr.; Laura Downey
- Produced by: Barbara Ligeti
- Starring: Patrick Dempsey; Robert Downey Jr.; Richard Lewis; Malcolm McDowell; Alyssa Milano; Cathy Moriarty; Sean Penn
- Cinematography: Joseph Montgomery
- Edited by: Joe D'Augustine
- Music by: Danilo Pérez
- Production companies: BMG Independents; Nomadic Pictures
- Distributed by: Northern Arts Entertainment
- Release date: December 12, 1997
- Running time: 92 minutes
- Country: United States
- Language: English
- Box office: $13,330

Hugo Pool (also known as Pool Girl in the UK) is a 1997 American comedy drama film, directed by Robert Downey Sr., starring Alyssa Milano and Patrick Dempsey.

The film received largely negative reviews, but praise was given to the production values, editing, and the performances by Dempsey, Milano and Downey. It grossed US$13,330 at the box office.

== Plot ==
Hugo Dugay runs a small company, Hugo Pool, that cleans swimming pools in Los Angeles. The film covers one day in her life, during which she must clean many pools in the midst of a drought that interferes with her usual water supply. In addition to dealing with several eccentric customers, including mobster Chick Chicalini and filmmaker Franz Mazur, Hugo must care for her needy parents Minerva and Henry. Also, Hugo may be falling in love with Floyd Gaylen, a customer of hers who has ALS.

== Cast ==
- Alyssa Milano as Hugo Dugay
- Patrick Dempsey as Floyd Gaylen
- Cathy Moriarty as Minerva Dugay
- Robert Downey Jr. as Franz Mazur
- Richard Lewis as Chick Chicalini
- Malcolm McDowell as Henry Dugay
- Sean Penn as man with blue shoes
- Paul Herman as the Rabbi

== Production ==
The film was written by Robert Downey Sr. and his wife Laura, who died of ALS. During the shooting of the film, Robert Downey Jr. was in the midst of a serious drug addiction. He was described as "thin, pale and sickly" and would deliver his lines in bursts of manic energy.

== Reception ==
In a December 1997 review for The Village Voice, Elizabeth Weitzman criticized many of the performances, with the exceptions of Dempsey, for giving an understated performance, Downey Jr., "whose talents cannot be destroyed no matter what horrors he puts them through," and Milano, "whose natural performance appears to have been cut and pasted from another (better) movie," though she "can't turn around without the camera lewdly ogling her." A Variety review states, "the movie seldom achieves the quirky, zany rhythm it strives for"; Hugo Pool is "a comedy that should have been messier and more outrageous." Like The Village Voice, Variety praises the performances of Dempsey, Milano and Downey Jr. above other cast members. The review notes the film's visual accomplishments and production, stating, "Production values are first-rate, including Joe Montgomery's radiant lensing, Lauren Gabor's colorful production design, Danilo Perez's vibrant music and Joe D'Augustine's crisp editing.

A January 1998 San Francisco Chronicle article included it on a list of the best films of 1997, which was based on the ratings of 40 major critics. Hugo Pool was included in Magill's Cinema Annual 1998: A Survey of the Films of 1997, with the book calling the film "horrifically unfunny." It also said, "actress Alyssa Milano spends the entire movie scantily clad in a tank top — and Downey does not let one gratuitous shot of her well-endowed body escape the camera's gaze", adding "Ms. Milano may be exploited, but the award of overacting in a feature film goes virtually uncontested to the director's son. If it were the intention of Robert Downey Jr. to parody his own well-publicized, real life substance abuse problems, it is neither admirable nor amusing. His inability to refrain from drug use resulted in the eventual arrest and conviction of one of Hollywood's most talented, yet unpredictability uneven actors."

=== Legacy ===
In a 2014 interview, Downey Sr. stated that Hugo Pool is "one of my films that I’m not so happy with." When ranking the 59 films of Robert Downey Jr. in 2021, Kyle Wilson of Screen Rant placed Hugo Pool 48th. He said it had "several failed attempts at heartfelt sincerity", but noted that Downey Jr. was "bizarrely captivating (if a bit over-cooked) as an eccentric film director."
