= FFTG Awards =

International digital film festival

FFTG Awards Film Fest
- Location: worldwide digital
- Founded: 2020 New York City, United States
- Founded by: Rohit Gupta
- Hosted by: Dot & Feather Entertainment
- Festival date: Late November – mid December (annually)
- Website: fftgawards.com

The FFTG Awards Film Fest is an annual international digital film festival founded in 2020 in New York City, United States, by filmmaker Rohit Gupta. It is held entirely online over two weeks beginning the weekend following Thanksgiving. Awards are presented in jury-selected and public-voted categories.

== History ==
FFTG stands for Film Festivals To Go, a platform originally established to support independent filmmakers through marketing, consulting for independent filmmakers and distribution services.

== Official Program ==
The first edition of the festival was held from November 23 to December 13, 2020. Over a 72-day submission period, the festival received more than 400 entries from 48 countries. A total of 129 projects were selected for the Official Program and 51 were nominated for awards. Major honors included Film of the Fest, People’s Choice Award, FFTG Spirit Award, and Best Screenplay.

== We, The Chosen Ones (Jury) ==
We, The Chosen Ones is the official name of the FFTG Awards jury initiative, launched in 2020. It is an invitation-only initiative in which jury members are selected from the previous year’s Official Program.

A coffee table book titled We, The Chosen Ones was also published in 2021, featuring creators and projects from the 2020 Official Program.

== FFTG Awards Film Fest events ==
=== 2020 FFTG Awards Film Fest ===
The 2020 FFTG Awards Film Fest was held digitally from November 23 to December 13, 2020.

==== Award winners ====
Award	Winner
Film of the Fest	We by Mani Nasry (Canada)
Audience Choice Award	Dastoor by Niranj Menon (India)
FFTG Spirit Award	A Niggling Question by Danielle Arden (Dubai, U.A.E.)
Best Feature Film	Hamlet/Horatio by Paul Warner (United States)

=== 2021 FFTG Awards Film Fest ===
The 2021 FFTG Awards Film Fest was held digitally from November 28 to December 12, 2021.

==== Award winners ====
Award	Winner
Film of the Fest	The Plumber by Cate Carson (United States)
Audience Choice Award	Troll by Heather Coombs (United Kingdom)
FFTG Spirit Award	The Day I Had to Grow Up by Stefano Da Frè and Laura Pellegrini (United States)
Best Feature Film	Trade by Trae Briers (United States)
Best Female Filmmaker	One-way Mirror by Elina Kurbatova (Russia)
Best Screenplay of the Fest	A Colorful Life by Ana Luísa Abreu (Brazil)
Best Student Filmmaker of the Fest	The Crab Basket by Paulo Cabrera Lasala (Chile)

=== 2022 & 2023 FFTG Awards Film Fest ===
The 2023 FFTG Awards Film Fest, combining the 2022 and 2023 editions, was held digitally from November 25 to December 10, 2023.

==== Award winners ====
Award	Winner
Film of the Fest	Clouds of Chernobyl by Ligia Ciornei (Romania)
Audience Choice Award	She'll Be Tired by Kim GeonWook (South Korea)
FFTG Spirit Award	The World Is My Stage by Andrew Arakkis (Russia)
Best Documentary Film of the Fest	Stolen Dough by Stefano Da Frè (United States)
Best Director	Once Upon a Time in Lahore by Jagat Joon (India)
Best Female Filmmaker	Blackbird by Morgan Davies (United States)
Best Feature Screenplay of the Fest	Synesthesia Story by Jillian Vitko (United States)

=== 2024 FFTG Awards Film Fest ===
The 2024 FFTG Awards Film Fest was held digitally from November 30 to December 13, 2024.

==== Award winners ====
Award	Winner
Film of the Fest	Reclaiming Our Humanity by Robert Mossi Alexander (United States)
Feature Film of the Fest	Long Life to Memories by Mariana Cecilia Russo and Alberto Sergio Masliah (Argentina)
Short Film of the Fest	Brother's Horn by Majid Asadi (Iran)
Audience Choice Award	Conspiracy Conscription by Abbas Tahaei (Iran)
FFTG Spirit Award	Vasomotir Rhinitis by Mikheil Gabaidze (Georgia)
Best Director	Long Life to Memories by Mariana Cecilia Russo and Alberto Sergio Masliah (Argentina)
Best Female Filmmaker	Winter Threshold by Soudabeh Beizaei (Iran)

=== 2025 FFTG Awards Film Fest ===
The 2025 FFTG Awards Film Fest was held digitally from November 29 to December 13, 2025.

==== Award winners ====
Award	Winner
Film of the Fest	Electric Queens of Brixton by Natasha Adams & James Early (United Kingdom)
Feature Film of the Fest	The Funeral of Kwadae (Ghana)
Documentary Feature Film	Beyond the Genocide (Rwanda)
Short Film	Mashhad (United States)
People's Choice Award	Mashhad (United States)
Filmmaker’s Choice Award	Blink (United States)
Female Filmmaker	Brujeria by Vanessa Volz (United States)

== Accolades ==
In 2025, the FFTG Awards Film Fest was awarded the 'Global Digital Film Festival of the Year' at the LUXlife Creative & Visual Arts Awards.

== See also ==
- List of film awards
- Online film festival
