= A Cry from Within =

- Film poster
- Directed by: Deborah Twiss; Zach Miller
- Written by: Deborah Twiss
- Starring: Deborah Twiss; Eric Roberts; Cathy Moriarty; James McCaffrey
- Distributed by: Breaking Glass Pictures
- Release date: March 17, 2015
- Country: United States
- Language: English

A Cry from Within is a 2015 American horror film directed by Deborah Twiss and Zach Miller and starring Twiss, Eric Roberts, Cathy Moriarty and James McCaffrey.

== Cast ==
- Deborah Twiss as Cecile
- Eric Roberts as Jonathan
- Cathy Moriarty as Alice
- James McCaffrey
- Pat Patterson as Sophia

== Release ==
The film was released on DVD and VOD on March 17, 2015.

== Reception ==
Matt Boiselle of Dread Central awarded the film two and a half stars out of five.
