= Robert Clohessy =

American actor (born 1957)

- Born: June 10, 1957 (age 69); New York City, U.S.
- Education: SUNY Purchase
- Occupation: Actor
- Years active: 1985–present
- Spouse: Catherine Erhardt
- Children: 2 (including Myles Clohessy)

Robert Clohessy (born June 10, 1957) is an American actor. He is best known for playing Correctional Officer Sean Murphy on the HBO prison drama Oz from seasons 3–6, in addition to playing Officer Patrick Flaherty on the NBC police procedural Hill Street Blues, Warden Boss James Neary on the HBO crime drama Boardwalk Empire for the first two seasons and Lieutenant Sid Gormley on the CBS police drama Blue Bloods.

== Early life ==
Clohessy was born in the Bronx, New York, the son of John Clohessy, a police officer. He fought in the 1975 Golden Gloves in Madison Square Garden. He graduated from Pearl River High School in Pearl River, New York, and from SUNY Purchase where he studied under Walt Witcover. He later obtained Irish citizenship through his grandparents, who immigrated from County Clare.

== Career ==
Clohessy has had recurring roles in daytime dramas All My Children, Boy Meets World, and Guiding Light. In primetime, he has become known for his multiple regular turns as police officers and other law enforcement officials, creating parallels between his acting career and upbringing by his policeman father. The first of such roles was in the seventh and final season of Hill Street Blues, as Officer Patrick Flaherty. The following season, Clohessy was cast as the new co-star of Pat Morita on the ABC detective series Ohara, playing Lt. George Shaver. In 1995, he appeared in the episode "Hell's Angel" of the situation comedy Double Rush.

He later joined the cast of the HBO prison drama Oz as Correctional Officer Sean Murphy. However, in between these roles, Clohessy had a supporting role as Thomas Smaraldo on NBC's comedy/drama Tattingers (1988–89) and soon after appeared in a starring role on NBC's short-lived comedy One of the Boys (1989). Clohessy co-starred on the Neal Marlens/Carol Black ABC sitcom Laurie Hill in 1992, playing a stay-at-home freelance writer. In 2008, Clohessy had a regular role in the short-lived Fox show New Amsterdam. He won a Screen Actors Guild Award for Best Ensemble in the HBO series Boardwalk Empire.

In feature films, Clohessy played a supporting role in Across the Universe, playing the part of Jude's long-lost father. He played Jack Parker in The Crimson Mask. His largest big budget film role was opposite Ryan Gosling in The Place Beyond the Pines. Onstage, he played Mike in the Broadway Roundabout Theatre Company revival of Pal Joey, from November 2008 through February 2009. He played the bartender in 27 Dresses (2008). From 2010 to the present (2024), he has had a supporting role as Sid Gormley, on the police drama Blue Bloods. In January 2012, he played Jack Healy in Season 1/Episode 13 in Unforgettable. In 2012, he portrayed Sergeant Silva in the film The Avengers.

== Filmography ==
=== Film ===
Year	Title	Role	Notes
1987	The Believers	Diner Detective	
1989	Sidewalk Stories	Alley Tough #1	
1993	Stone Soup	Stephen	
1994	Angels in the Outfield	Frank Gates	
2005	The Interpreter	FBI Agent King	
2005	The Signs of the Cross	Vic	
2006	16 Blocks	Cannova	
2006	A Merry Little Christmas	Mayor	
2007	Across the Universe	Wesley 'Wes' Huber	
2007	One Night	Doug	
2007	Mattie Fresno and the Holoflux Universe	Det. Journell	
2008	27 Dresses	Dive Bartender	
2008	The Drum Beats Twice	Victor Pepperdine	
2008	Calling It Quits	Jake	
2008	Priceless	Jerry	
2009	The Crimson Mask	Jack Parker	
2010	An Affirmative Act	Lance Lane	
2010	All Good Things	Building Superintendent	
2011	Arthur	Veteran Cop	
2011	Fake	Patrick White	
2011	My Last Day Without You	Scully	
2011	Tower Heist	Parade Cop	
2012	Man on a Ledge	Prison Guard	
2012	The Avengers	Sergeant Silva	
2012	The Night Never Sleeps	Detective Jablonsky	
2012	The Place Beyond the Pines	Chief Weirzbowski	
2012	Desperate Endeavors	Mark	
2012	Broadway's Finest	Buckley	
2013	Send No Flowers	Mickey O'Mara	
2013	The Immigrant	Immigration Official	
2013	The Wolf of Wall Street	Nolan Drager	
2014	Charlie Mantle	Bartender	
2014	A Most Violent Year	Mr. Rose	
2014	A Strong Collected Spirit	Lolly Kent	
2015	Living with the Dead: A Love Story	John McLean	
2015	Disco!	Cowboy Kevin	
2015	And It Was Good	Driver	
2016	Teenage Mutant Ninja Turtles: Out of the Shadows	Deputy Warden Hamlett	
2016	To Whom It May Concern	Jack	
2016	Sugar!	Ben	
2016	Confidence Game	Anthony	
2016	My Art	Frank	
2016	The Drowning	Captain Miller	
2017	Good Time	NYPD Police Officer	
2017	The Devil's Restaurant	Chef Dominick	
2018	Honor Amongst Men	John Halmo	
2018	The Brawler	Anthony Mango	
2020	Equal Standard	Internal Affairs Detective Rullan	
2020	A Beautiful Distraction	Morgan	
2020	Chemical Hearts	Martin Sawyer	
2020	Chronicle of a Serial Killer	Judge Weber	
2021	Last Call	Aiden	
2021	The Last Disco	Kevin Sansone	
2022	Fire Island	Detective Jack	

=== Television ===
Year	Title	Role	Notes
1986–1987	Hill Street Blues	Patrick Flaherty	20 episodes
1987	St. Elsewhere	Policeman	Episode: "Last Dance at the Wrecker's Ball"
1987–1988	Ohara	Lt. George Shaver	19 episodes
1988–1989	Tattingers	Father Thomas Smaraldo	3 episodes
1989	One of the Boys	Mike Lukowski	6 episodes
1989	Midnight Caller	Phil Gaff	Episode: "Tarnished Shield"
1989–1991	Jake and the Fatman	Doug McEwen / Victor Potemkin	3 episodes
1990	The Young Riders	Roy	Episode: "Hard Time"
1990	Father Dowling Mysteries	Capt. Hayden	Episode: "The Sanctuary Mystery"
1990	Monsters	Stanley	Episode: "One Wolf's Family"
1990	Matlock	Harlan Fondy	Episode: "The Narc"
1991	Doogie Howser, M.D.	Jeff Moore	Episode: "A Life in Progress"
1991	Roseanne	Christian / Al	Episode: "Communicable Theater"
1991	Perry Mason: The Case of the Fatal Fashion	Tony Loomis	Television film
1991	Reasonable Doubts	Johnny Ray Simpson	Episode: "Making Dirt Sick"
1992	In the Shadow of a Killer	Sean Doyle	TV movie
1992	Devlin	Kevin McQuaid	TV movie
1992	Laurie Hill	Jeff Hill	10 episodes
1994	Assault at West Point: The Court-Martial of Johnson Whittaker	Dan Broyles	TV movie
1994	The Good Life	Joe	Episode: "John's New Assistant"
1994	Couples	Ray	TV movie
1994	Lois & Clark: The New Adventures of Superman	John Dillinger	Episode: "That Old Gang of Mine"
1994, 1996	Diagnosis: Murder	Merrick's Bodyguard / Reggie	2 episodes
1995	Homicide: Life on the Street	Detective Douglas Jones	Episode: "Partners"
1995	Love & War	Sam Biondi	Episode: "Mob Story"
1995	All-American Girl	Average Tony	Episode: "Pulp Sitcom"
1995	Double Rush	Fr. Joe Sardella	Episode: "Hell's Angel"
1995	The Great Mom Swap	Frank Balfour	TV movie
1995	NYPD Blue	Frank Wuthrich	Episode: "Torah! Torah! Torah!"
1995	High Society	Mitchell Brumberg	Episode: "Sleeping with the Enemy"
1995	My Wildest Dreams	Mel McGinnis	Episode: "Something's Gotta Give (Pilot)"
1996	Murder, She Wrote	Max Daniels	Episode: "Death Goes Double Platinum"
1996	Chicago Hope	Robert Malzone	2 episodes
1997	Married to a Stranger	David Potter	Television film
1997	The Practice	Detective Gagen	Episode: "Hide and Seek"
1998	Boy Meets World	Matt Frazier	Episode: "Eric Hollywood"
1998	Remember WENN	Policeman	Episode: "The Follies of WENN"
1998–2009	Law & Order	Various roles	4 episodes
1999	A Touch of Hope	Larry	TV movie
1999–2003	Oz	Officer Sean Murphy	38 episodes
2000	Guiding Light	Gil	6 episodes
2000	Third Watch	Danny Gamble	Episode: "Jimmy's Mountain"
2000–2013	Law & Order: Special Victims Unit	Leo Barth / Joel Parven / Vinnie	4 episodes
2001	100 Centre Street	Mike Byrne	Episode: "And Justice for Some"
2002 & 2006	Law & Order: Criminal Intent	Roger Lemoyne / Phil LeGrand	2 episodes
2003	All My Children	Doug Lewis	Episode #1.8526
2003	Hack	Jack Tully	Episode: "Third Strike"
2003	Without a Trace	David Brummond	Episode: "Clare de Lune"
2004	Rescue Me	Steven	Episode: "Butterfly"
2006	The Book of Daniel	Billy	2 episodes
2006	Conviction	Coach Hankins	Episode: "Denial"
2006	Six Degrees	Scott Faubel	Episode: "Pilot"
2006–2007	Kidnapped	The Operator	9 episodes
2007	The Black Donnellys	Agent Hicks	Episode: "When the Door Opens"
2007	Damages	Lawrence Pedroia	Episode: "We Are Not Animals"
2008	New Amsterdam	Detective Santori	6 episodes
2009	Life on Mars	Frank Wyatt	Episode: "Let All the Children Boogie"
2009	The Unusuals	Mike Boorland	Episode: "Boorland Day"
2010	White Collar	Roy	Episode: "Unfinished Business"
2010–2011	Boardwalk Empire	Alderman Jim Neary	17 episodes
2010–2024	Blue Bloods	Sid Gormley	
2012	Unforgettable	Jack Healy	Episode: "Brotherhood"
2012–2013	Curse of the Crimson Mask	Jack Parker	3 episodes
2014	The Blacklist	William Munson	Episode: "The Judge (No. 57)"
2015	Cold Bloods	Captain	2 episodes
