= Living with the Dead (film) =

2002 American television film by Stephen Gyllenhaal

- Genre: Drama; Sci-Fi; Crime; Mystery; Thriller
- Based on: Talking to Heaven by James Van Praagh
- Written by: John Pielmeier
- Directed by: Stephen Gyllenhaal
- Starring: Ted Danson; Mary Steenburgen; Diane Ladd; Michael Moriarty
- Theme music composer: Normand Corbeil
- Country of origin: United States
- Original language: English

Production
- Executive producers: Greg Gugliotta; Shanna Nussbaum; Stanley M. Brooks
- Producer: Preston Fischer
- Cinematography: Jeff Jur
- Editor: Neil Mandelberg
- Running time: 240 minutes
- Production companies: Nitelite Entertainment; Columbia Broadcasting System; Gaslight Pictures; Once Upon a Time Films

Original release
- Network: CBS
- Release: April 28 – April 30, 2002

Living with the Dead (released in Europe as Talking to Heaven) is a 2002 American made-for-television supernatural crime drama film directed by Stephen Gyllenhaal and starring Ted Danson, Diane Ladd, Queen Latifah, Mary Steenburgen and Jack Palance. It was inspired by the life of medium James Van Praagh. The film first aired on CBS in the U.S. and was later rated PG-13.

In the United States, the film was released as Living with the Dead; the working title was Talking to Heaven, and this was also the release title in Europe.

== Plot ==
Seven dead boys are trying to communicate through James (Ted Danson) to tell their story of how they died and that their murderer is still out there. James agrees to work alongside the detective investigating the murders, and discovers who murdered the seven boys.

== Cast ==
- Ted Danson as James Van Praagh
- Mary Steenburgen as Detective Karen Condrin
- Diane Ladd as Regina Van Praagh
- Michael Moriarty as Adrian, Psychic
- Connor Widdows as Young James Van Praagh
- Joy Coghill as Mrs. Ziff
- Jay Brazeau as Psychiatrist
- Maggie Blue O'Hara as Sandy - Andy's deaf sister
- Queen Latifah as Midge Harmon
- Jack Palance as Allan Van Praagh
- Reece Thompson as Andy, Abducted Boy
- Neil Denis as Dennis Branston
- Mikela Jay as Young Regina Van Praagh (billed as Mikela J. Mikael)
- Eric Breker as Young Allan Van Praagh
- Lindsay Bourne as Priest
- Kavan Smith as Matt
- Hiro Kanagawa as Frank the Business Consultant
- Bill Meilen as Eli Ziff
- John B. Lowe as David Ziff
- Henry O. Watson as Walter Branston
- Veena Sood as Mrs. Morse, School Teacher
- David Kaye as Gideon Morse
- James Kirk as Eddie Katz, Molly's Son
- Deborah Twiss as Sophia McLean
- Joel Palmer as Second Boy
- Ben Johnson as Third Boy
- Branden Nadon as Fourth Boy
- Matthew Brevner as Fifth Boy
- Jaren Brandt Bartlett as Sixth Boy
- Bethoe Shirkoff as James' Grandmother
- Michael Eklund as Ronnie Higgins
- Ben Baxter as Billy, Boy in Schoolyard
- Nancy Sivak as Sister Mary Edward
- Karen Elizabeth Austin as Nun (billed as Karen Austin)
- Dee Jay Jackson as Police Desk Sergeant (billed as Deejay Jackson)
- Klodyne Rodney as Nurse
- Kwesi Ameyaw as Doctor
- Lorena Gale as Midge's Grandmother
- Richard Sali as News Vendor
- David Petersen as Karen's Father
- Jessica Schreier as Psychiatrist's Wife

== Production ==
The movie was filmed in Vancouver, British Columbia, Canada.
