= The Big Take =

- Directed by: Justin Daly
- Written by: Justin Daly
- Produced by: Jen Gatien
- Starring: James McCaffrey; Ebon Moss-Bachrach; Zoë Bell; Bill Sage; Dan Hedaya; Robert Forster
- Production company: Archstone Distribution
- Distributed by: Sony Pictures Home Entertainment
- Release date: September 4, 2018
- Running time: 83 minutes
- Country: United States
- Language: English

The Big Take is a 2018 American thriller comedy film written and directed by Justin Daly and starring James McCaffrey, Ebon Moss-Bachrach, Zoë Bell, Bill Sage, Dan Hedaya and Robert Forster. It is Daly's feature directorial debut and also marked McCaffrey's final film role before his death in 2023.

== Cast ==
- Robert Forster
- James McCaffrey
- Ebon Moss-Bachrach
- Zoë Bell
- Bill Sage
- Dan Hedaya
- Oksana Lada
- Slate Holmgren

== Release ==
The film was released on DVD and digital platforms on September 4, 2018.

== Reception ==
Anthony Ray Bench of Film Threat awarded the film an 8 out of 10.
