= Rented Lips =

1988 film by Robert Downey, Sr.

- Directed by: Robert Downey Sr.
- Written by: Martin Mull
- Starring: Martin Mull; Dick Shawn; Jennifer Tilly; Robert Downey Jr.
- Cinematography: Robert Yeoman
- Music by: Van Dyke Parks
- Distributed by: The Vista Organization
- Release date: July 1, 1988
- Running time: 82 minutes
- Country: United States
- Language: English

Rented Lips is a 1988 satire comedy film directed by Robert Downey Sr., and starring his son Robert Downey Jr., as well as Martin Mull, Dick Shawn, and Jennifer Tilly. It was the final film appearance of Shawn, who died in 1987.

== Plot ==
Archie is a documentary filmmaker who works alongside his best friend and cinematographer Charlie on films such as Aluminum, Our Shiny Friend. He still lives at home with his mother, who is frustrated at Archie's single-minded focus on filmmaking, as she would rather he go out and meet a nice woman.

The two friends are given a chance to create their passion project, a musical on Indian farming techniques if they complete a film for an executive, who will allow them to use the same cast and crew. When they arrive on set they discover that the film is actually a porno with a terrible script set during World War II. The two decide to continue on and improve the script, which they turn into a musical exploitation film. Various issues pop up on and off set, which include an eccentric actor named Wolf and threats to the film executive from an extreme religious organization.

Archie's mother sets him up on a blind date with Mona Lisa, who is delighted to learn he is a director. Swayed by her looks and enthusiasm, Mona Lisa is added to the cast but is given no adult scenes. This frustrates Wolf, who tries to incorporate sex scenes from the original script, only to be rebuffed by Mona Lisa. Just as filming is going well, the leader of the religious organization, Rev. Farrell, arrives on set with several of his followers to set everything on fire. He stops when he sees Mona Lisa, who is revealed to be his daughter. This all proves too much for Archie, who storms off the set. Archie ultimately changes his mind and decides to complete both films. He also learns that Rev. Farrell made pornography himself and was responsible for writing the original script, which Archie uses as blackmail.

Ultimately Archie completes both films and achieves professional success. The film then cuts to a scene of Archie waking up, as he had been sleeping on his typewriter. He then continues to write, after which the scenes of professional success continue, leaving it up to the viewer to determine whether the events really happened or was only a script he was writing.

== Cast ==
- Martin Mull as Archie Powell
- Dick Shawn as Charlie Slater
- Jennifer Tilly as Mona Lisa
- Robert Downey Jr. as Wolf Dangler
- Kenneth Mars as Reverend Farrell
- June Lockhart as Archie's Mother
- Tony Cox as Tyrell

== Release ==
Rented Lips was released theatrically in July 1988. It was released to home video in September of the same year.

== Reception ==
Critical reception for Rented Lips was negative upon its release. Reviewers for The Calgary Herald and Des Moines Register both panned the film, the former stating that it was a movie "destined for the list of the worst movies ever made." The Daily Times-Advocate was similarly critical, writing "I can't recall ever seeing a movie so unprofessionally written and executed or so embarrassingly played. It's shabby."
