= James McCaffrey (actor) =

American actor (1958–2023)

- McCaffrey in 2004 as Jimmy Keefe on Rescue Me
- Born: March 27, 1958; Albany, New York, U.S.
- Died: December 17, 2023 (aged 65); Larchmont, New York, U.S.
- Occupations: Actor; voice actor
- Years active: 1987–2023
- Notable work: Rescue Me; Max Payne; Alan Wake; Control
- Spouse: Rochelle Boström
- Children: 1

James Perry McCaffrey (March 27, 1958 – December 17, 2023) was an American actor. He starred as the lead character in the short lived series Swift Justice, which was cancelled after only a season. Additionally, he had roles such as Jimmy Keefe on Rescue Me (2004–2011), and Captain Arthur O'Byrne in New York Undercover (1994–1997). He also had main roles and recurring roles in a number of television series as well as appearing in feature films. In addition, he did voice acting, such as his voice role as Max Payne in the Max Payne video game series.

== Career ==
McCaffrey's first role was as a mentally challenged teen in Bill II: on His Own: The Bill Sackter Story. He played the lead in the first and last seasons of the series Viper, and the short-lived series Swift Justice, and has appeared on As the World Turns and Sex and the City. Additionally, McCaffrey is known for playing deceased New York City firefighter Jimmy Keefe on Rescue Me, as well as Ryan Huntley on Revenge. He also starred as neon artist Tony O'Neil in the independent film The Eyes of St. Anthony, directed by Paul Devlin.

McCaffrey in addition was a voice actor appearing in many video games. He provided his voice to the title character in the Max Payne trilogy of games. In addition, he appeared in a cameo role in the film adaptation of the video game, playing an FBI agent brought in to assist in the capture of Payne. McCaffrey was also the voice of both Thomas Zane and Alex Casey in the Alan Wake games, Director Trench in Control and starred as Edward Carnby in the 2008 reboot of Alone in the Dark. He also starred as Father Thomas in the mystery thriller film A Cry from Within.

== Personal life ==
McCaffrey was born in Albany, New York, in 1958. He was married to actress Rochelle Boström, and had a daughter.

McCaffrey died from multiple myeloma at his home in Larchmont, New York, on December 17, 2023, at the age of 65.

== Filmography ==
=== Films ===
| Year | Title | Role | Notes | Ref. |
|---|---|---|---|---|
| 1988 | New York's Finest | Maitre d' | Direct-to-video | |
| 1990 | Bail Jumper | National Guard | Credited as Jim McCaffrey | |
| 1993 | Telling Secrets | Jackson Merrick | Television film | |
| 1994 | Schemes | Paul Stewart | Direct-to-video | |
| 1995 | Burnzy's Last Call | Sal | | |
| 1996 | The Truth About Cats & Dogs | Roy | | |
| 1997 | Nick and Jane | Nick | | |
| 1997 | Shanghai 1937 | Frank Taylor | Television film | |
| 1999 | The Tic Code | Michael | | |
| 1999 | Coming Soon | Dante | | |
| 1999 | The Florentine | Jack Ryan | | |
| 1999 | Switched at Birth | Darryl | | |
| 2003 | American Splendor | Fred | | |
| 2003 | Distress | Jack Douglas | | |
| 2004 | She Hate Me | Bob | | |
| 2004 | Fresh Cut Grass | Sam | | |
| 2005 | Hide and Seek | Charlie | Uncredited | |
| 2005 | Jokebitch | Killer | Short film | |
| 2007 | Broken English | Perry | | |
| 2007 | Feel the Noise | Jeffrey Skylar | | |
| 2008 | Max Payne | FBI Special Agent Jack Taliente | Uncredited cameo | |
| 2008 | Last Call | Steven | | |
| 2009 | Sordid Things | Jagger Manchester | | |
| 2010 | The Pregnancy Pact | Michael Dougan | Television film | |
| 2010 | Nonames | Mr. Williams | | |
| 2010 | Meskada | Billy Burns | | |
| 2010 | Camp Hope | Dr. John | | |
| 2011 | Busted Walk | Mr. Turner | Short film | |
| 2011 | One Fall | Werber Bond | | |
| 2011 | The Orphan Killer | Detective Jones | | |
| 2011 | Montauk | Roger | Short film | |
| 2012 | Compliance | Detective Neals | | |
| 2012 | To Redemption | Nick Reed | | |
| 2012 | Excuse Me for Living | Barry | | |
| 2013 | The Suspect | Polaski Sheriff | | |
| 2013 | Stain Removal | Jules | | |
| 2014 | A Cry from Within | Father Thomas | | |
| 2014 | Gun Hill | Alex Web | Television film | |
| 2014 | Betrayed | Sully | Television film | |
| 2014 | Like Sunday, Like Rain | Dale | | |
| 2015 | Sam | Seymour | | |
| 2015 | Coach of the Year | Fred Call | | |
| 2015 | I Dream Too Much | Nikki | | |
| 2016 | Confidence Game | David | | |
| 2016 | Blind | Howard | | |
| 2018 | The Big Take | Douglas Brown | | |

=== Television series ===
| Year | Title | Role | Notes | Ref. |
|---|---|---|---|---|
| 1992 | Civil Wars | Terence Flanagan | 4 episodes | |
| 1994–1997 | New York Undercover | Captain Arthur O'Byrne / Jack Dale | 7 episodes | |
| 1994, 1996–1999 | Viper | Joe Astor / Michael Payton | 34 episodes | |
| 1996 | Swift Justice | Mac Swift | 13 episodes | |
| 1997 | The Big Easy | Dominick | Episode: "The Gospel According to McSwain" | |
| 1998 | Sex and the City | Max | Episode: "The Monogamists" | |
| 2000 | Law & Order: Special Victims Unit | Jesse Hansen | Episode: "Bad Blood" | |
| 2001 | The Job | Jeff Larsen | Episode: "Foot" | |
| 2001 | Sex and the City | Paul Denai | Episode: "The Real Me" | |
| 2003 | Queens Supreme | Johnny Garrett | Episode: "The House Next Door" | |
| 2003 | Law & Order: Criminal Intent | Daniel Croydon | 2 episodes | |
| 2003 | As the World Turns | Charley Spangler | 11 episodes | |
| 2003 | Hack | Coslow | Episode: "See No Evil" | |
| 2003 | Law & Order: Special Victims Unit | Peter Forbes | Episode: "Coerced" | |
| 2004–2011 | Rescue Me | Jimmy Keefe | Main role 55 episodes | |
| 2005–2006 | Beautiful People | Julian Fiske | 12 episodes | |
| 2006 | 3 lbs | Eric Linden | Episode: "The God Spot" | |
| 2008 | Canterbury's Law | Frank Angstrom | 4 episodes | |
| 2011 | Blue Bloods | Detective William Carter | Episode: "Little Fish" | |
| 2011 | The Glades | Frank Ford | Episode: "'shine" | |
| 2011 | A Gifted Man | Milt Sandreski | Episode: "Pilot" | |
| 2011–2012 | Revenge | Ryan Huntley | 4 episodes | |
| 2013–2018 | Suits | Gordon Specter | 3 episodes | |
| 2013 | White Collar | Lieutenant Gannon | Episode: "At What Price" | |
| 2014 | The Following | David | 2 episodes | |
| 2014 | Forever | Professor James Browning | S1/E2: "Look Before You Leap" | |
| 2017 | Bull | Thornton Grey | Episode: "Make Me" | |
| 2017 | Madam Secretary | Rex Mayfield | Episode: "The Detour" | |
| 2017–2019 | She's Gotta Have It | Danton Phillips | 5 episodes | |
| 2018 | Jessica Jones | Maximillian 'Max' Tatum | 2 episodes | |
| 2019 | Bluff City Law | Tucker Goodman | Episode: "You Don't Need a Weatherman" | |
| 2022 | Blue Bloods | Sergeant Kevin Coolidge | Episode: "Old Friends" | |

=== Video games ===
| Year | Title | Role | Notes | Ref. |
|---|---|---|---|---|
| 2001 | Max Payne | Max Payne | | |
| 2003 | Max Payne 2: The Fall of Max Payne | Max Payne | | |
| 2005 | Area 51 | Additional Voices | | |
| 2008 | Alone in the Dark | Edward Carnby | | |
| 2010 | Alan Wake | Thomas Zane, Alex Casey | | |
| 2012 | Max Payne 3 | Max Payne | Voice and motion capture | |
| 2019 | Control | Zachariah Trench | | |
| 2023 | Alan Wake 2 | Alex Casey | | |

== Awards and nominations ==
| Year | Award | Category | Nominated work | Result | Ref. |
|---|---|---|---|---|---|
| 2004 | 7th Annual Interactive Achievement Awards | Outstanding Character Performance - Male | Max Payne 2: The Fall of Max Payne | Nominated | |
| 2024 | 20th British Academy Games Awards | Performer in a Supporting Role | Alan Wake II | Longlisted | |
