= A Gun for Jennifer =

- Directed by: Todd Morris
- Written by: Todd Morris; Deborah Twiss
- Produced by: Deborah Twiss
- Starring: Deborah Twiss
- Cinematography: Joe di Gennaro; Eliot Rockett; David Tumblety
- Edited by: Todd Morris; Rachel Warden
- Music by: JF Coleman
- Production company: Independent Partners
- Distributed by: Action Gitanes; Conspiracy Films Inc.
- Release date: 1997
- Running time: 85 minutes
- Country: United States
- Language: English

A Gun for Jennifer is a 1997 rape and revenge film thriller film directed by Todd Morris and starring Deborah Twiss. It follows a feminist vigilante group who castrate suspected rapists and batterers while a female police officer attempts to stop them. It is shot in a retro exploitation style and premiered at the Fantasia Festival in July 1997, where it was sold out an hour before screening and received a standing ovation.

The film went unreleased for years; Fangoria reported that it had been picked up for distribution by Mondo Macabro, but the release never came to fruition. Finally, in November 2023 it was released on Blu-ray by Vinegar Syndrome.

The movie was covered in the documentary In the Belly of the Beast, which detailed Morris and Twiss's discovery that their financier (whom Twiss had met while working as an exotic dancer) had been embezzling money.

== Cast ==
- Deborah Twiss as Jennifer / Allison
- Benja Kay as Dt. Billie Perez
- Rene Alberta as Becky
- Tracy Dillon as Grace
- Freida Hoops as Jesse
- Veronica Cruz as Priscilla
- Sheila Schmidt as Trish
- Beth Dodye Bass as Annie
- Joe Pallister as Grady (as Joseph Pallister)
- Arthur J. Nascarella as Lt. Rizzo (as Arthur Nascarella)
- Carl Jasper as Carl Varna
- James O'Donoghue as Det. Cahill
- Douglas Gorenstein as Snake
- Raymond Chan as Skeletor
- Lord Kayson as T-Bone
- Fatmir Haskaj as Josh
