= William Hasley =

American biographer and television writer (1947/1948–2026)

- Born: 1947 or 1948; Pittsburgh, Pennsylvania, U.S.
- Died: June 6, 2026 (aged 78)
- Occupations: Biographer; television writer
- Spouse: Robin Riker (divorced)

William Hasley (1947 or 1948 – June 6, 2026) was an American biographer and television writer. He was best known for co-writing the motivational book Finding the Champion Within along with Caitlyn Jenner. He also wrote for television programs including Fat Albert and the Cosby Kids, The Smurfs, Swift Justice and The Young Riders.

Hasley died on June 6, 2026, at the age of 78, after being found near Runyon Canyon.
