= Stefano Da Frè =

Canadian actor and filmmaker

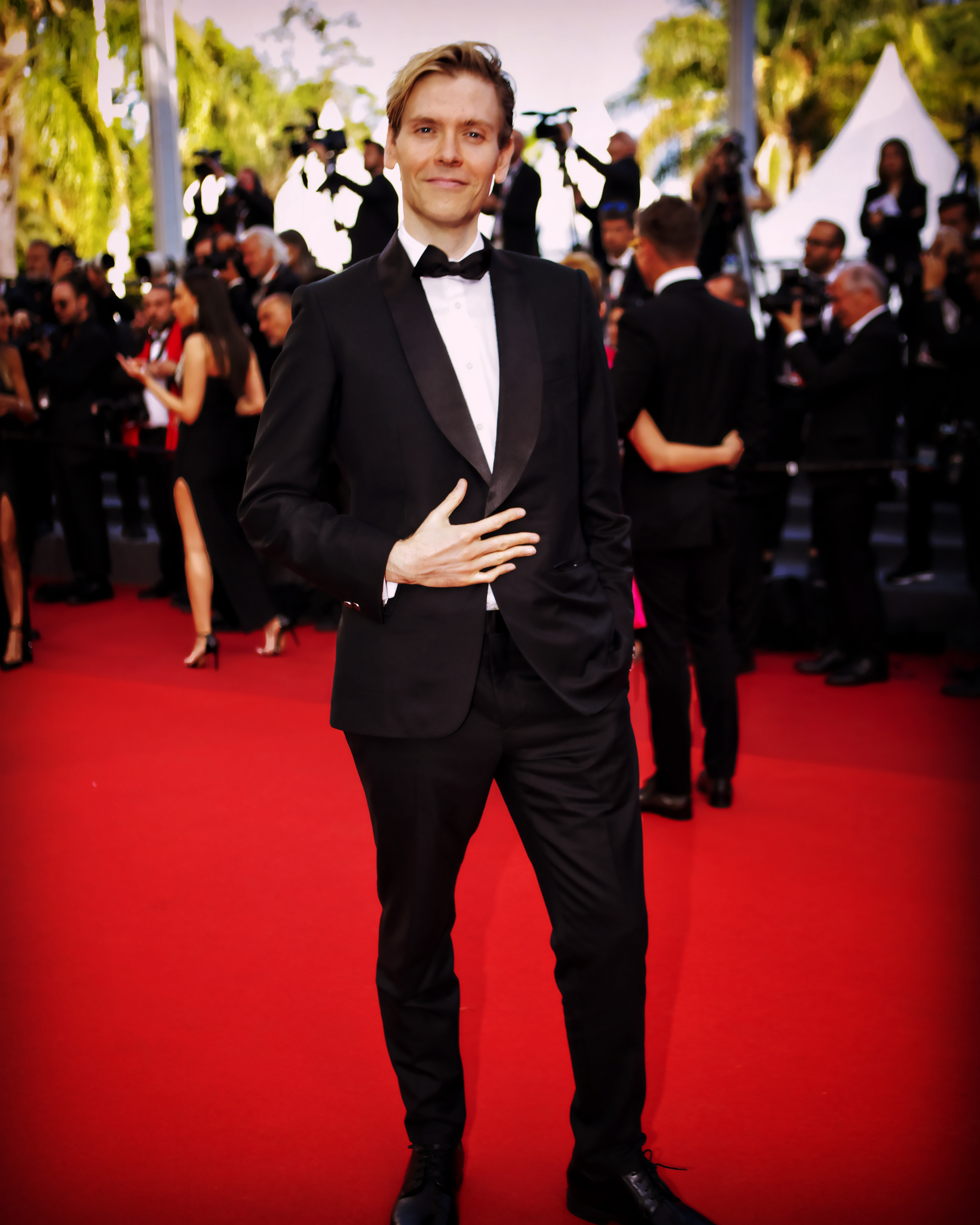
- Da Frè at the 2023 Cannes Film Festival.
- Born: Stefano Da Frè; Italy
- Education: Neighborhood Playhouse School of the Theatre
- Occupations: Actor; Film director Film producer
- Years active: 2008–present
- Spouse: Sierra Boggess (m. 2023)
- Website: stefanodirector.com

Stefano Da Frè is an Italian-Canadian director, producer, and actor. He is the co-founder and president of Rosso Films International.

Da Frè is best known for directing, screenwriting and producing the crime drama Stolen Dough on Apple TV. Da Frè is also recognized for the documentaries The Girl Who Cannot Speak featured on NBC's Meet The Press Film Festival in collaboration with the American Film Institute and the social activism film The Day I Had to Grow Up. His films have been screened at multiple film festivals including the Cannes Film Festival and the Chelsea Film Festival in New York.

== Early life and education ==
Born in Italy, Da Frè initially received training from the Ryerson Theatre School before attending the Neighborhood Playhouse School of the Theatre in New York City.

== Career ==
After graduating, Da Frè began his career with a role in Taking Woodstock, a film directed by Ang Lee, which premiered at the 2009 Cannes Film Festival. Later that year, Da Frè appeared in Law & Order: Criminal Intent. Da Frè subsequently appeared in TV series including Blue Bloods, One Bad Choice, Pandora's Box: Unleashing Evil.

In 2009, Da Frè was elected as a member of the selection committee for the Montreal International Film Festival, and has been an active member ever since.

In 2018, Da Frè's documentary, The Girl Who Cannot Speak, debuted, exploring five women's sexual abuse narratives amidst the MeToo movement. Later that year, it was screened at the Cannes Film Festival and at the Meet The Press Film Festival in Washington, D.C., a festival co-hosted with the American Film Institute. The film was also selected for screening at St. Louis International Film Festival and the Saguenay International Short Film Festival in 2019.

In 2020, Da Frè directed and produced The Day I Had to Grow Up, a documentary on U.S. youth activism addressing issues such as gun violence and climate change. The film was featured at the 2021 St. Louis International Film Festival and won the Jury Prize at Switzerland International Film Festival. The documentary also won the FFTG Spirit Award in 2021. In the same year, Da Frè co-directed another film titled The Moon in Deep Winter with Laura Pellegrini. Subsequently, the film was screened twice at the Cannes Film Festival. It also received the Best Screenplay Award at the Chelsea Film Festival in New York.

In December 2022, Da Frè wrote and directed a feature film, Stolen Dough, with Da Frè as executive producer and Laura Pellegrini as main producer. The film explores the battle between Italian-American inventor Anthony Mongiello and Pizza Hut over the patent for stuffed crust pizza. The documentary, which received the Russo Brothers Italian American Film Forum Grant, is scheduled to air on the Disney Channel in 2023. In July 2023, the documentary won the Best Documentary Award at the Athens International Monthly Art Film Festival in Athens, Greece.

In July 2023, Da Frè advocated in support of the SAG-AFTRA union strike against AMPTP Producers.

In October 2023, Stolen Dough screened at the DOC LA Los Angeles Film Festival for its California Premiere. Da Frè received an Honorable Mention Award in the feature film category of the festival.

In November 2023, Stolen Dough screened as the opening night film at The North Film Festival in New York City. The festival ran from 15 November to 18 November. Da Frè won an award for Best Director in the feature film category at the festival. Later in November, Stolen Dough had its Scottish Premiere at the Grosvenor Picture Theatre in Glasgow, Scotland. Stolen Dough's Scottish Premiere was part of its Gala series that included the film Bitter Taste, directed by Harry Holland and starring Spider-Man actor Tom Holland, followed by Da Fre's Stolen Dough as the main feature film.

In December 2023, Da Frè was awarded Best Documentary of the Film Festival, for Stolen Dough, at the FFTG Awards.

Apple TV premiered Stolen Dough on its international streaming platform in January 2024.

Following the Stolen Dough launch on Apple TV, Da Frè was invited to screen the film in official selection at the Croatia International Film Festival in Sibenik, Croatia during the month of August 2025. The festival opened with Bleecker Street's The Friend, starring Bill Murray and Naomi Watts. Da Frè won the jury prize for "Best Director" for Stolen Dough at the Croatia International Film Festival. During the festival, he was interviewed by Variety about the business of filmmaking and about receiving the festival award for "Best Director" for Stolen Dough.

In 2026, Stefano released a concept TV pilot called A Slice Of The Family Business, which was funded by National Italian American Foundation in association with Aurelio De Laurentiis Film Prize. The pilot is currently being developed with Netflix Italia to become a six episode season.

In January 2026, Da Frè was invited to be on the judging committee for the Storyteller Universe. The film event took place on January 17th, 2026 in New York City. That same month, Da Fre was one of eight Canadian producers selected for the Quebec English Language Council's business accelerator cohort. This initiative is supported by the Canada Media Fund's Sector Development Program and SODEC's Mission Assistance Program. He is currently working on an upcoming narrative feature film about a blind painter that is scheduled for a release in 2027.

== Personal life ==
On January 3, 2022, Broadway actress Sierra Boggess announced her engagement to Da Frè. The couple were married at the Chateau Coindre Hall on Long Island, New York on April 23, 2023.

== Filmography ==
=== Film ===
- Taking Woodstock (2008)
- Confidence Game (2016)
- Tu Me Manques (2017)
- Sarah Q (2018)
- The Moon in Deep Winter (2018)
- The Girl Who Cannot Speak (2019)
- The Day I Had to Grow Up (2020)
- Stolen Dough (2023)
- A Slice Of The Family Business (2026)

=== Television ===
- Law & Order: Criminal Intent (2009)
- One Bad Choice (2015)
- Immunity (2016)
- Pandora's Box: Unleashing Evil (2016–2018)
- That Damn Michael Che (2022), Season 2, Episode 4

== Awards and recognition ==
- 2018: Best Screenplay Award for The Moon in Deep Winter at the Chelsea Film Festival
- 2021: FFTG Spirit Award for The Day I Had To Grow Up
- 2023: Best Documentary Award for Stolen Dough at the Athens International Monthly Art Film Festival
- 2023: Honorable Mention Award for Stolen Dough at DOC LA Los Angeles Film Festival
- 2023: Best Director Award for Stolen Dough at The North Film Festival
- 2023: Best Documentary Film of the Fest Award for Stolen Dough at the FFTG Awards Film Fest.
- 2025: Best Director Award for Stolen Dough at the Croatia International Film Festival
