= Deborah Twiss =

American actress

- Born: December 22, 1971 (age 54)
- Occupations: Actress, screenwriter, film director, producer
- Height: 5 ft 8 in (173 cm)
- Website: DeborahTwissActress.com

Deborah Twiss (born December 22, 1971) is an American actress, screenwriter, film director and producer with roles in films and television shows such as Kick-Ass, Gravity, Law & Order: Special Victims Unit and White Collar.

== Career ==
Deborah Twiss made her screen debut in 1997 with A Gun for Jennifer, an independent exploitation thriller film directed by Todd Morris that she also co‑wrote. Following this she was cast in a series of lead and supporting roles in several independent films including Molotov Samba.

Twiss later appeared in TV shows including Law & Order: Special Victims Unit, Law & Order: Criminal Intent, White Collar, and Gravity as well as feature films such as In Between. She has two children, Matthew and Sydney McCann, who played characters based on them in her film A Cry From Within, inspired by experiences they had as a family.

In the film Kick-Ass, she portrayed the mock superhero's teacher-crush, Mrs. Zane. Post Kick-Ass, Twiss appeared in the Michael Chiklis-produced Pawn and in A.D. Calvo's The Midnight Game, and appeared opposite Eric Roberts in A Cry From Within, which wrapped principal photography in spring 2014. She has also appeared in The Networker opposite Sean Young and William Forsythe.

Tapping her independent film experience, Twiss is developing several projects in which she will play lead roles including Just In Time, Parallel Veins, the horror comedy film Bloody Ultimatum, and a revenge horror film Contract With A Demon. She wrote and co-directed 2014 the Horror mystery thriller film A Cry from Within, which was co-directed with Zach Miller.

== Filmography ==
=== Film ===
Year	Film	Role	Notes
1997	A Gun for Jennifer	Jennifer/Allison	
2002	Living with the Dead	Sophia McLean	
2005	Audrey keiko azuma	Audrey 2	
2005	Molotov Samba	Dominique	
2005	Love Thy Neighbor	Female Porn Star	
2005	In Between	Allison	
2009	The Little Magician	The Mother	
2010	Kick-Ass	Mrs. Zane	
2010	The Aristofrogs		
2011	Choose	Terri Connelley	
2011	Turbine	Lisa	
2011	School of Rock: Zombie Etiquette	Sally O'Niel	
2011	After Fall, Winter	Caroline	
2012	One Last Time	Tueta	
2012	Sunburn	Natalie	
2013	The Midnight Game	Noreen-Kaitlan's Mom	
2013	Uncomfortable Silence	The Wife	
2013	Pawn	Mrs. Davenport	
2013	November Lies	Nikki Evans	
2014	A Cry From Within	Cecile	
2014	The Last Taxi Driver	Sibyl	
2014	Act, Naturally	Miz Mashmeyer	
2014	Fifteen For The Angels	Casshandra	
2015	The Networker	Nicole	
2015	Confidence Game	Jessica	

=== Television ===
Year	Title	Role	Notes
2008	Law & Order: Criminal Intent	Dr. Lane	1 episode: “Purgatory” S7E11
2009	Fringe	ER Nurse	1 episode: “There's More Than One of Everything” S1E20
2010	White Collar	Kathy	1 episode: "Front Man" S1E13
2010	As the World Turns	Angela	1 episode
2010	Gravity	Dr. Joyce Allen	1 episode: "Cold Swim Away" S1E3
2011	Law & Order: Special Victims Unit	Pilot	1 episode: "Flight" S12E15
2017	The Deuce	Mindy	1 episode: "Au Reservoir" S1E7
