= Stuffed crust pizza =

Pizza with filled crusts

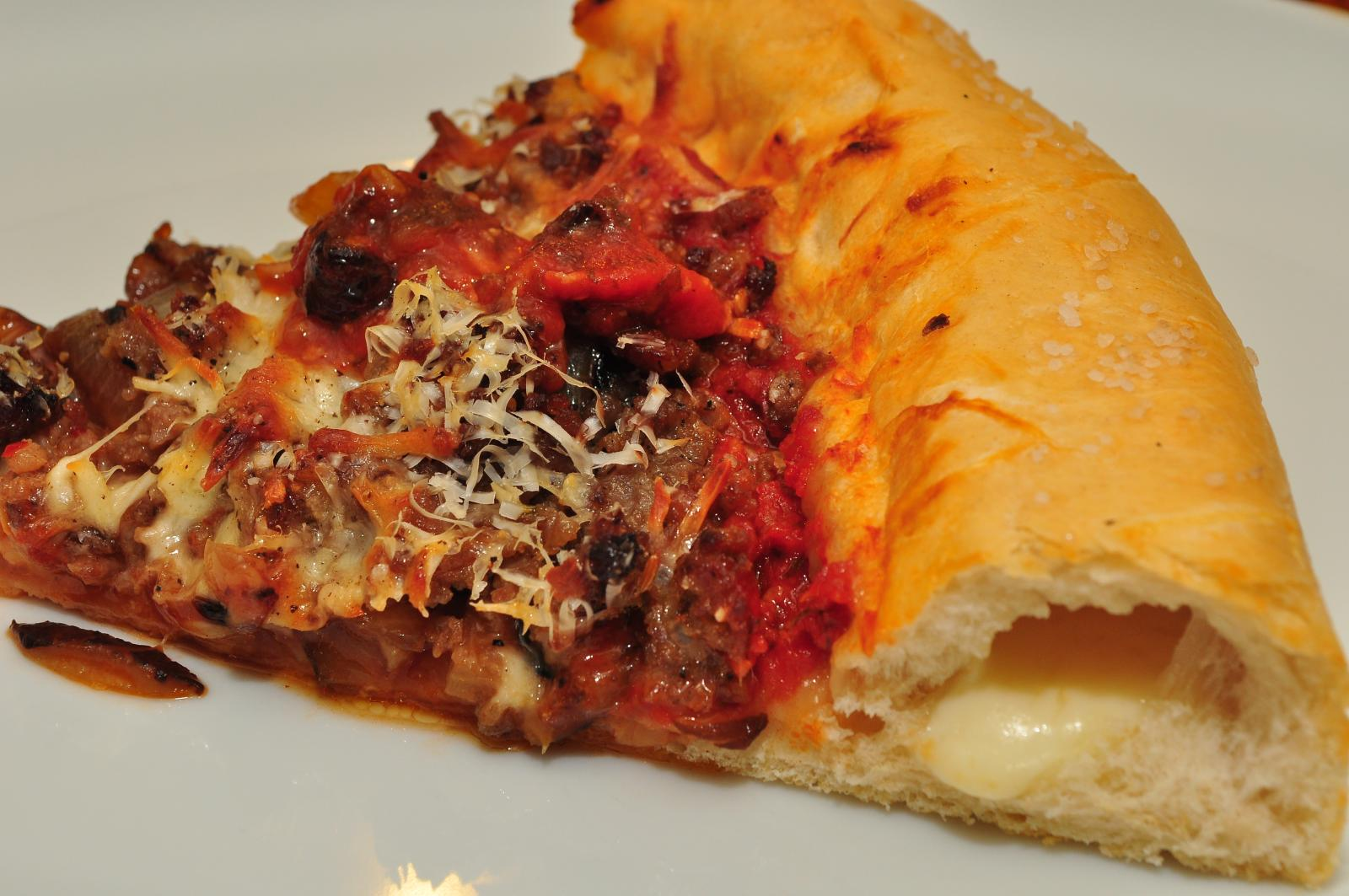
- Type: Pizza
- Place of origin: United States

Stuffed crust pizza is pizza with cheese (typically mozzarella) or other ingredients added into the outer edge of the crust. The stuffed crust pizza was popularized by Pizza Hut, which debuted this style of pizza in 1995.

== History ==
Pizza Hut introduced stuffed crust pizza, created by Patty Scheibmeir, and launched it on March 25, 1995. It was marketed in a commercial with Donald Trump.

Pizza Hut was sued by the family of Anthony Mongiello for $1 billion, over claims that Pizza Hut's stuffed crust infringed on Mongiello's 1987 patent (US4661361A) on making stuffed pizza shells. A feature film titled Stolen Dough on Apple TV by film director and screenwriter Stefano Da Frè extensively details the Mongiello family's challenges to prove their case in a court of law; however Pizza Hut was ultimately found to have not infringed on the Patent in 1999, the court stating "...[the] plaintiff does not have a product patent, and its method patent is not infringed simply because some examples of defendant's completed product approximate plaintiff's product."

DiGiorno began offering a cheese stuffed crust pizza in grocery stores in 2001.

In 2012, Pizza Hut launched hot dog stuffed crust pizza in Japan, China, and South Korea, followed by Australia, Canada, the U.K., and the U.S. Domino's also sold a hot dog stuffed crust pizza in the U.S., U.K., and New Zealand.

Pizza Hut New Zealand has sold Marmite stuffed crust pizza, and Pizza Hut Japan introduced a pizza with a crust of pockets stuffed with, alternately, Camembert, shrimp, sausage, and mozzarella. Pizza Hut Japan offered a crust stuffed with shrimp and mayonnaise, and Pizza Hut Germany offered a "German King" with a sausage, bacon, and cheese-stuffed crust. Pizza Hut Japan and South Korea have sold pizza with shrimp and cheese-stuffed crust, and Pizza Hut Hong Kong made abalone sauce "Cheesy Lava"-stuffed crust pizza. Pizza Hut Australia made a pizza with a crust stuffed with miniature meat pies.

In 2020, Papa John's released its own cheese-filled stuffed crust pizza.

In 2023, Little Caesars also introduced stuffed crust pizza; it is available during the winter season. That same year, Pizza Pizza also introduced stuffed crust pizza.

In 2025, Domino's USA announced that they were launching their own stuffed crust pizza.

In 2026, Papa Gino’s announced that they were launching a limited edition stuffed crust pizza in collaboration with Drake Maye.

== See also ==
- Pizza in the United States
- Pan pizza
- List of tomato dishes
