= Season Finale (book) =

Book by Susanne Daniels and Cynthia Littleton

- Author: Susanne Daniels, Cynthia Littleton
- Original title: Season Finale: The Unexpected Rise and Fall of the WB and UPN
- Language: English
- Publisher: Harper
- Publication date: October 16, 2007
- Media type: Print, e-book
- Pages: 400
- ISBN: 978-0061340994
- OCLC: 1021132513

Season Finale: The Unexpected Rise and Fall of The WB and UPN is a book written by Suzanne Daniels, former executive President of Entertainment for The WB, and Cynthia Littleton, reporter of Variety and published by HarperCollins. This book explains the details of the history of The WB and UPN.

== Summary ==
Season Finale suggests many reasons for the demise of The WB, including founder Jamie Kellner's departure, the lack of owned and operated stations, a failure to develop many new hits after 2002, Time Warner's decision to merge with America Online and allowing Buffy the Vampire Slayer to move from The WB to UPN for its last two seasons.

== See also ==
- 2007 in television
