= Stolen Dough =

2023 crime film

- Directed by: Stefano Da Frè
- Produced by: Laura Pellegrini
- Cinematography: A.J. DeSimone
- Production company: Rosso Films International
- Release date: 24 April 2023; (theatrical)
- Running time: 46 minutes
- Country: United States
- Language: English

Stolen Dough is a 2023 American feature film crime drama directed by Stefano Da Frè. Stolen Dough's screenplay is written by Stefano Da Frè. The film’s producers are Laura Pellegrini and Stefano Da Fre.

Stolen Dough was the recipient of a grant by The Russo Brothers Italian American Film Forum, sponsored by the National Italian American Foundation (NIAF), the Italian Sons and Daughters of America (ISDA), the Russo brothers, and AGBO.

== Cast ==
- Cody Pomposello as Young Anthony
- Sal Rendino as Eugene Goldstein
- Bobby Kruger as Young Paul Sutton
- Vincent Ticali as Joseph Russo
- Russ Camarda as J.R. Powell
- Armand Madeo as Young Lawrence
- Katie Kane as Cynthia Parson
- Paul J. Sutton as Self
- Anthony Mongiello as Self
- Stefano Da Frè as the Narrator

== Synopsis ==
Stolen Dough is a true story of an Italian-American product inventor named Anthony Mongiello, whose patent for stuffed crust pizza was allegedly stolen by Pizza Hut. On April 28, 1987, Anthony Mongiello was issued U.S. Patent No. 4661361. The patent specifically detailed a "method of making a pizza, where one would take sticks of mozzarella cheese, line the outer rim of the dough with the cheese sticks, and fold it over before baking.

When the patent was formally approved, Mongiello approached all major U.S. pizza chains, hoping to enter a partnership. The only one to show interest was Pizza Hut. After formally reviewing the patent twice, Pizza Hut declined Mongiello's offer. In 1995, Pizza Hut ran a national commercial (featuring Donald Trump) debuting its new "Stuffed Crust Pizza" product.

Stolen Dough follows Mongiello's legal battle against Pizza Hut, setting the stage for a one billion-dollar patent infringement lawsuit.

== Accolades ==
In April 2023, Stolen Dough had its world premiere at the WorldFest-Houston International Film Festival, where the film received a Gold REMI Award.

In October 2023, Stolen Dough screened at the DOC LA Los Angeles Film Festival. The film's director Stefano Da Frè received an Honorable Mention Award in the feature film category of the festival.

In November 2023, Stolen Dough screened as the opening night film at The North Film Festival in New York City. Da Frè won an award for Best Director in the feature film category at the festival. Later that month, Stolen Dough had its UK Premiere at the Grosvenor Picture Theatre in Glasgow, Scotland. The film was part of its Gala series that included the film Bitter Taste, directed by Harry Holland and starring Spider-Man actor Tom Holland, followed by Stolen Dough as the main feature film.

In August 2025, Stolen Dough was selected to screen at the Croatia International Film Festival in Sibenik, Croatia. The festival opened with Bleecker Street's The Friend, starring Bill Murray and Naomi Watts. Stefano Da Fre was awarded the jury prize for "Best Director" for Stolen Dough at the festival's closing ceremony.

== Release ==
Apple TV premiered Stolen Dough on its international streaming platform in January 2024.

=== Critical reception ===
Stolen Dough received generally positive reviews from film critics. Film Threat gave the film a 7.5 out of 10, claiming the story is one "that has to be told. We have to be reminded of the dangers of capitalism at its absolute worst and how much power corporations have to steal our ideas without regard..."

From UK Film Review, Patrick Foley praised Stolen Dough for being "entertaining" and "worth investment given its shorter runtime and colourful, vibrant production."

In his review from Influx Magazine, Gordon Shelley commended the film for "build[ing] to a very emotional climax...it follows the tried and true formula that has been successful for the syndicated true crime format for many years. And [Stolen Dough] does it well."

In November 2024, a film review from the Athens International Monthly Art Film Festival highlighted Stefano Da Fre's filmmaking work as "exemplary and... effectively immersing the audience in the world of pizza innovation and corporate intrigue."

In April 2025, J. Zimmerman of Video Librarian gave the film 4 out of 5 stars. The review describes how Da Fre succeeds in creating a classic American portrait of beating the odds: "Americans love an underdog, and the film makes it clear that Anthony was just that; the inventor with an industry-changing idea."
