= Sophie Constantinou =

American documentary filmmaker

Sophie Constantinou is an American film director, cinematographer, and producer. Constantinou co-founded Citizen Film, a San Francisco based documentary nonprofit. She has served on the board of the California Native Plant Society, Collective Eye Films, and San Francisco's Park and Recreation Open Space Advisory Committee.

== Career ==
Constantinou co-founded Citizen Film in 2002 with Sam Ball and Kate Stilley Steiner. She is credited as a director and cinematographer on several films. She made Trans (1994), which premiered at Frameline Film Festival. She also directed and filmed Between the Lines (1998) and Divided Loyalties (2001). She directed photography for the PBS documentary Presumed Guilty (2000), The PBS/POV film Maquilapolis (2006), KQED’s Emmy-winning Home Front, and HBO feature documentaries Unchained Memories (2003) and Regarding Susan Sontag (2014).

Constantinou filmed The Joy of Life (2005) and was director of photography on The Royal Road (2015), which were both Sundance Film Festival selections directed by Jenni Olson.

At Citizen Film, Constantinou directed Community Leadership 2010 for the San Francisco Foundation, which recognizes individuals and organizations "whose leadership makes a significant impact in Bay Area communities". Constantinou's other directing credits with Citizen Film include Joann Sfar Draws from Memory (2012) about graphic novelist Joann Sfar; Lunch Love Community (2014), a transmedia project about public school food systems co-directed with Helen De Michiel; GLIDE Memorial Church's Living Legacy series; and the Narrative Shift project (2021 – 2024) made in collaboration with San Francisco Human Rights Commission's Dream Keeper Initiative.

Constantinou has also worked on initiatives in the Fillmore District since 2010. Produced by Citizen Film, Buchanan Stories / Buchanan Change documents challenges and advancements associated with a campaign to renovate the Buchanan Street Mall, a public park in the neighborhood. Constantinou is also the founder of San Francisco's Bernal Cut Project, a neighborhood beautification project.
