= Stilley =

Stilley or Stiley is a surname of the following people:

- Dave Stilley (born 1974), American lacrosse player
- Joe Stiley, American businessman and passenger of the Air Florida Flight 90
- John Stilley Carpenter (1849–1925), American settler and bishop of the LDS Church in Utah
- Kate Stilley Steiner, American filmmaker, editor, and producer
- Margo Stilley (born 1982), American actress and writer
