= The Joy of Life =

2005 American film by Jenni Olson

- Film poster
- Directed by: Jenni Olson
- Written by: Jenni Olson
- Produced by: Julie Dorf; Russ Gage; Paul Lee; Scott Noble
- Narrated by: Harry Dodge; Lawrence Ferlinghetti
- Cinematography: Sophia Constantinou
- Edited by: Marc Henrich
- Music by: Weldon Kees
- Distributed by: Frameline/Strand (DVD)
- Release date: January 21, 2005 (Sundance)
- Running time: 65 minutes
- Country: United States
- Language: English

The Joy of Life is a 2005 experimental landscape documentary film by filmmaker Jenni Olson about the adventures of a butch lesbian in San Francisco, California, and the history of suicide at the Golden Gate Bridge. Following its January 21, 2005 premiere at the Sundance Film Festival, the film renewed discussion regarding the installation of a suicide barrier on the Golden Gate Bridge.

== Synopsis ==
The film is structured in three parts.

The first act is a voiceover describing the sex life of a butch lesbian living in San Francisco. It follows her search for love and provides vivid descriptions of her sexual encounters while expressing how alone she feels, giving insight into a butch's desire for someone with whom she can be vulnerable.

The second act is Lawrence Ferlinghetti's poem "The Changing Light."

The third act is a summarized history of the Golden Gate Bridge's status as the top landmark in the world from which people jump in order to end their lives. It contains not only a summary of the history of suicides at the bridge, but also the history of the political and superficial arguments that have been made against installing a barrier. It cites sources to refute those arguments.

The Joy of Life also includes a history of the film Meet John Doe by Frank Capra.

Stills of the city of San Francisco are shown throughout the narration.

== Cast ==
- Harry Dodge, narrator
- Lawrence Ferlinghetti, narrator

== Production ==
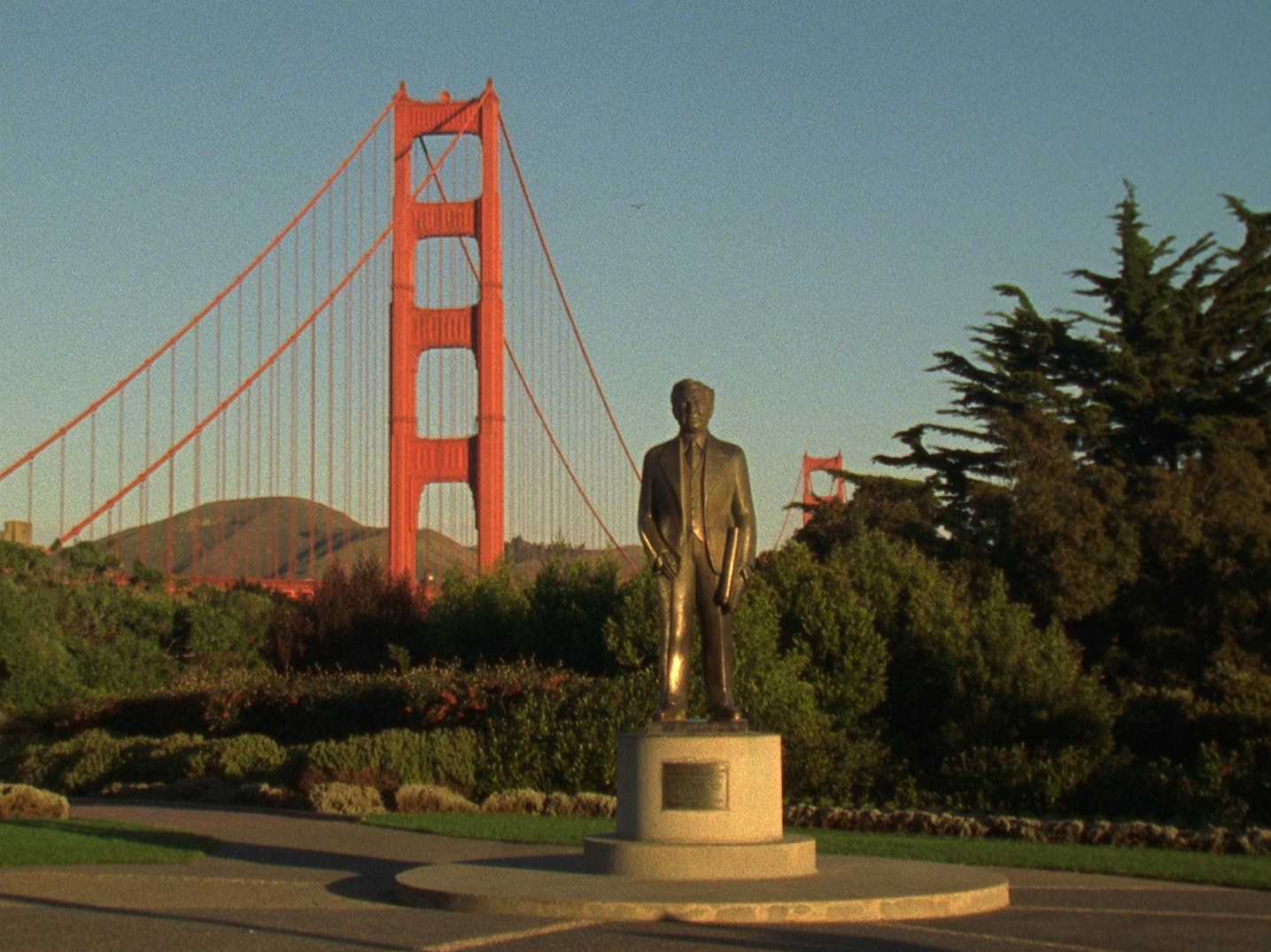
The Joy of Life production still

The Joy of Life was produced by Julie Dorf, Russ Gage, Paul Lee, and Scott Noble. Jenni Olson wrote and directed the film, with Sophia Constantinou handling cinematography. It was filmed on 16 mm film with a stationary camera. Despite the original medium, lab issues with color timing required the film to be finished and released in high-definition digital format. Marc Heinrich edited the film, and Weldon Kees composed the music. Kadet Kuhne engineered the sound.

The film's title originated from an Omar Cigarettes advertisement that Olson walked past daily. The first half was adapted from her unpublished manuscript called Fuck Diary. Olson decided on the subject of the second half of the film due to her friend Mark Finch's decision to end his life by jumping from the Golden Gate Bridge.

The structure of the film was inspired by William E. Jones's Massillon. Olson made The Joy of Life over a period of eight years. She received a grant from the San Francisco Arts Commission, held fundraisers, and self-funded the film. The Joy of Life is Olson's first feature-length film.

== Release ==
The Joy of Life premiered at the 2005 Sundance Film Festival on January 21, 2005 as an official selection for the Frontier section. Frameline gained North American distribution rights in March 2005. The film was released in the UK on April 6, 2005 at the London Lesbian and Gay Film Festival.

It screened at the 48th Frameline Film Festival on May 1, and in the Boston Gay and Lesbian Film Festival at the Museum of Fine Arts on May 13 and May 20. It played in the Identities Queer Film Festival on June 6, and in the SilverDocs festival on June 19. The film screened at the Philadelphia International Gay & Lesbian Film Festival in July.

It played at the Castro Theatre from July 11 to 14, shown with Katherine Leggett's Small Town Secrets, and at the Rialto Lakeside Cinema in Santa Rosa from July 22 to 28, 2005. It screened as part of the LGBT Film/Video Festival in Milwaukee, playing at the Union Theatre on October 6. It premiered in Canada at the 24th Vancouver International Film Festival in September-October 2005.

The film screened as part of the Documentary Showcase section of the Mar del Plata International Film Festival in March 2006. It played in the Torino International Gay and Lesbian Film Festival in April. It screened at the Museum of Modern Art on November 16, and at the IFC Center on November 20.

The film has been included as part of several showcases. In January 2007, it showed at the San Francisco Camerawork gallery as part of a showcase titled "Traces of Life on the Thin Film of Longing." On April 24, 2015, it screened as part of the Brooklyn Academy of Music's "The Vertigo Effect" series, and on October 20, it played as part of Bucknell University's Film/Media Series. On August 27, 2023, it screened as part of UCLA's series San Francisco Plays Itself: Scenes from the Bay at the Hammer Museum, and in April 2025, both The Joy of Life and Olson's Blue Diary were shown as a part of the "40 Years of Queer" series at the Roxie Theater.

=== Home Media ===
The Joy of Life was released on DVD July 25, 2006 through Frameline/Strand. Special features included a trailer as well as three of Olson's short films.

== Reception ==
=== Critical reception ===
Scott Foundas, reviewing for Variety, found the first half of the film to be filled with purple prose, but approved of the exploration of the Golden Gate Bridge's history as it related to suicide. Foundas also appreciated Constantinou's cinematography. A brief review by Rob Nelson in The Village Voice praised the cinematography and the narration. Nelson called the film "gently hypnotic" in addition to it being "a forceful call to action" to add a barrier.

Dennis Harvey, writing for the San Francisco Bay Guardian, found the first section detailing the butch lesbian's journey to be highly enjoyable. Harvey was equally impressed with the cinematography capturing the city as "tranquil and small." Harvey noted that the transition to covering suicide deaths at the Golden Gate Bridge is "sharp," yet called the film "beautiful." Brandon Judell briefly noted in IndieWire that he was impressed with the script, calling the film "seductive." R.J. Grubb of Bay Windows noted that the stills in the first section of the film include many shots where the Golden Gate Bridge is not the center, but looms in the background. Grubb also enjoyed Olson's script and praised her use of active voice in her writing.

Rich Cline, writing for Shadows on the Wall, praised the imagery, but stated that it felt "disconnected and dispassionate." Cline found the first part to be "somewhat moving," and compared the Bridge portion to "a radio documentary." He rated it three out of five stars. Darwin Porter and Danforth Prince, in Blood Moon's Guide to Gay and Lesbian Film, said that The Joy of Life may have been better presented as two shorts, claiming that audiences at Sundance were unsure how to categorize the film. They praised Constantinou's cinematography, but felt the juxtaposition of topics was "incongruous." Mariano Kairuz of Página 12, on the other hand, included it on a list of "must-see" films at the 2006 Mar del Plata International Film Festival.

Candace Moore, reviewing for AfterEllen, found the film to be engaging. Moore enjoyed the prose of the first act. She was also moved by the activism the third act intends to kindle. Moore made special note of the theme of being alone throughout the film, not only in the text, but also in the images which depict streets with no people and "graffiti marking places on walls where someone once was." She also made mention that when the film screened at Sundance, the crowds were full. A brief review from Wesley Morris of the Boston Globe also noted the theme of solitude and enjoyed the way that the exteriors contrast the inner thoughts conveyed. Morris also called The Joy of Life the best film at the Boston Gay and Lesbian Film Festival.

Sam Adams, writing for the Philadelphia City Paper, did not like the film, stating that the imagery remained static in its mood throughout. Adams also stated that though he found the memories and the essay interesting separately, there was no transition between them. He called them "incompatible." In contrast, Gary Morris, analyzing the film for Bright Lights Film Journal, commented that the history of Meet John Doe being included between the two segments ties them together through suicide. The way Capra's film ending changed parallels the way in which society does not wish to address the issue of suicide, and more acutely, the Golden Gate Bridge, Highway and Transportation District's decision to ignore the obvious answer to the continuing issue on the Bridge. Morris also noted that the images shown during the diary portion depict a world in which the Bridge is ever-present despite not being the focus. These images transition into shots of the Bridge, "more blood-red than golden." Morris found the film "compelling" and praised the cinematography, as well as the decision to shoot with 16 mm film rather than a digital camera.

Eric Campos, writing for Film Threat, stated that the transition from the recollections of sexual encounters to the documentary of the Bridge comes across as natural because the sexual accounts are not always presented as "the fondest of memories." Campos rated the film 3.5 stars, stating that it is "an experiment that works" and it avoids pretentiousness. Hariette Yahr briefly reviewed the film in an introduction to an interview with Olson for MediaRights, praising the cinematography as "almost sensual" and calling the film "both political and erotic." Kelly Vance, reviewing Frameline29 for the East Bay Express, stated The Joy of Life was "the pick of the festival" while admitting that the film is not something everyone will enjoy. Vance appreciated the cinematography, impressed with how it complemented the ruminations on loneliness.

David Lamble, reviewing for the Bay Area Reporter, enjoyed the film, praising Olson's writing, Dodge's voiceover, and Constantinou's cinematography. Lamble was especially impressed with the comparisons of the original ending to Meet John Doe and Joseph Strauss's statement that using the Bridge to end one's own life would be both impossible and improbable.

Reviewing the DVD release, P. Hall of Video Librarian rated it two out of four stars, stating that they could not recommend the film. Hall described the first part of the film as narration from a "self-absorbed Midwestern lesbian" and felt the film would have been better as an exploration of the unhappiness and desperation that has led people to end their lives by jumping from the Bridge. Cheryl Chang, reviewing the DVD for Video Business, did note that the connection between the musings of the first part and the coverage of the Bridge was "tenuous," but did praise Olson's writing. Cheng acknowledged that general audiences would likely not be interested in the film, calling it a "test of patience," though one that could cause those who do view it to "[reflect] on what brings them joy."

Jeffrey Anderson, reviewing for Combustible Celluloid, rated it four out of four stars, calling it "extraordinary journalism." Nick Davis, an associate professor at Northwestern University teaching film analysis as well as queer theory and gender studies, gave the film a B−. Davis noted how the imagery captures a feeling of solitude, and how despite a city's population, it can be easy to feel lonely. He also noted that the visuals generally coincide with the voiceover, but occasionally do provide a counterpoint. Davis praised Henrich's editing. He felt that the film focuses too much on the Bridge, stating that the narration of memories does not feel as though it genuinely belongs to the speaker.

=== Retrospective reviews ===
Patricia Silva, reviewing for Directed by Women, found the film to be an elegy using light as its main medium. Silva noted that the areas Olson chose to capture in the film, by being out of the main thoroughfare of San Francisco, allow the audience to absorb the ruminations without "visual invasions of compulsive heterosexuality." Silva also praised Olson for conveying the subject without having to rely on direct images of death.

Shayna Maci Warner, writing for The Gay Gaze, saw The Joy of Life's first section as an expansion of Olson's Blue Diary. Warner describes Diary as a "poem" and Joy as a "manifesto on yearning, intimacy, and loss." She noted that the melancholy suffusing the voice over of the first act provides a "fluid stylistic balance" as the film moves into the third act's focus on the Bridge. Warner did note that the imagery remained "similarly composed" in both parts.

Juan Antonio Suárez, in Unbound Queer Time in Literature, Cinema, and Video Games, noted that the absence of a specific locale within the city, save for the Bridge, and the focus on ordinary places and sights allows the audience to connect with the concepts. Suárez stated that the film features "memory of place," which allows it to provide a perspective of San Francisco in which "sex and death stand side by side."

=== Accolades ===
The Joy of Life received Outfest's Best Outstanding Artistic Achievement as well as Newfest's Best U.S. Narrative Screenplay in 2005. In December 2005, Olson received the Marlon Riggs Award from the San Francisco Bay Area Film Critics Circle, honored for "expanding the parameters of narrative, documentary and personal cinema while capturing the unique rhythms of life in San Francisco."

== Political response ==
On January 14, 2005, the San Francisco Chronicle published an op-ed by Olson – an adaption of a section of the film's script – calling for a suicide barrier on the Golden Gate Bridge. An excerpt had also been printed in the Bay Area Reporter on January 13. While on her way to Sundance, Olson received a phone call from Tom Ammiano in which he stated that he had spoken with then-mayor Gavin Newsom about the film and they planned to address the issue.

On January 19, an article in the Chronicle announced that Eric Steel had filmed people's suicides throughout 2004, prompting Ammiano to respond, "Whatever the intention of the film, you can't help but think of a snuff film." Following The Joy of Life's premiere at Sundance, the District's board of directors announced that they were revoking their pledge not to change the architecture of the bridge.

In cooperation with the Psychiatric Foundation of Northern California, copies of the film were provided to members of the District board. The board voted on March 11, 2005 to commission studies and designs for a barrier. A barrier was eventually approved in 2008, though funding of US$76,000,000 was not approved until 2014. Once bid proposals were submitted for the project, the high end estimate rose to US$198,000,000.

Construction eventually began in April 2017. The majority of the installation of steel nets was completed by January 2024, with some sections employing vertical fencing or a combination of the two. It covers nearly the full length of 1.7 miles (2.7 km) on each side. The project is expected to be fully completed by 2027. In 2025, only four people were able to jump to their deaths from the bridge.

== See also ==
- 2005 in film

== Sources ==
- "Bucknell University FIlm/Media Screenings at the Campus Theatre Earl Fall 2015" (PDF). Bucknell University. 2015. Archived from the original (PDF) on August 29, 2015.
- "Changes: Torino 21st Gay & Lesbian Film Festival". PopMatters. June 2, 2006.
- "Film rep clock". Bay Guardian. Vol. 39, no. 40. July 6, 2005. p. 82 – via Internet Archive.
- "Film Specials". Arts & Entertainment (insert). Boston Phoenix. Vol. 34, no. 19. May 13, 2005. p. 8 – via Internet Archive.
- "Flemington DIY announces film series featuring 'contemporary innovative artists'". NJ.com. January 4, 2023. Archived from the original on January 5, 2023.
- "Frameline acquires Jenni Olson's The Joy of Life". Out Traveler. The Advocate. March 12, 2005. Archived from the original on February 2, 2023.
- "Identities 2005" (PDF). Identities Queer Film Festival. June 2005. Archived from the original (PDF) on January 4, 2007.
- "International, Queer Films Invade Frisco". Mom Guess What?. Vol. 28, no. 502. April 15, 2005. p. 12 – via Internet Archive.
- "Jenni Olson's Joy of Life at SF Camerawork, January 4–February 24". The Advocate. December 30, 2006. Archived from the original on April 12, 2026.
- "The Joy of Life". Hammer Museum. August 27, 2023.
- "The Joy of Life" (PDF). Lovers Film Festival - Torino LGBTQI Visions. 2006. Archived from the original (PDF) on May 15, 2006.
- "The Joy of Life (2005) + Blue Diary (1998)". Roxie Theater. 2025. Archived from the original on January 17, 2025.
- "Nick Davis, Associate Professor of English". Northwestern University. n.d. Archived from the original on May 18, 2026.
- "Out in Park City". The Advocate. February 1, 2005. p. 20. Gale A128101995.
- "Revivals, Classics, Etc". The New Yorker. November 20, 2006. pp. 25–6.
- "The VIFF Turns its Focus to New American Indies and Eastern Europe" (PDF). Vancouver International Film Festival. 2005. Archived from the original (PDF) on February 19, 2006.
- "Yizor for the Fallen". Jewish Gaily Forward. Vol. 33, no. 3. July 2012. pp. 5, 10 – via Internet Archive.
- Adams, Sam (July 7, 2005). "Week One Shorts". Philadelphia City Paper. Archived from the original on December 23, 2005.
- Anderson, Jeffrey M. (n.d.). "The Joy of Life (2005)". Combustible Celluloid.
- Bateson, John (January 6, 2026). Frye, Devon (ed.). "Physical Barriers at Jump Sites Prevent Suicides: There were no suicides from the Golden Gate Bridge during the last seven months of 2025". Psychology Today.
- Blum, Andrew (March 20, 2005). "Suicide Watch". The New York Times. Archived from the original on May 29, 2015.
- Campos, Eric (January 25, 2005). "The Joy of Life". Film Threat. Archived from the original on November 5, 2009.
- Cheng, Cheryl (June 26, 2006). "Shadows Arthouse Films '05: The Joy of Life". Video Business. Vol. 26, no. 26. p. 16. Gale A148371435.
- Cline, Rich (April 13, 2005). "The Joy of Life". Shadows on the Wall. Archived from the original on April 21, 2005.
- Davis, Nick (n.d.). "The Joy of Life". Nick-Davis.com. Archived from the original on July 23, 2024.
- Foundas, Scott (March 7, 2005). "The Joy of Life". Variety. Vol. 398, no. 3. p. 49. Gale A130390788.
- Grubb, R.J. (January 27, 2005). "Being butch". Bay Windows. Archived from the original on July 28, 2005.
- Hall, P. (September 11, 2006). "The Joy of Life". Video Librarian.
- Harvey, Dennis (July 2005). "'The Joy of Life': July 11–14, Castro Theatre". San Francisco Bay Guardian. Archived from the original on March 17, 2006.
- Harvey, Dennis (December 13, 2005). "S.F. crix join growing 'Mountain' lovefest". Daily Variety. Vol. 289, no. 53. p. 36. Gale A140487386.
- Honeycutt, Kirk (December 1, 2004). "Fest opens with 'Endings': Sundance to host 87 world premieres". The Hollywood Reporter. Vol. 386, no. 39. pp. 1, 8, 17. Gale A126311690.
- Judell, Brandon (May 12, 2005). "48th San Francisco International Film Festival: The Hills Are Alive with the Sounds of Courtney Cox". IndieWire. Archived from the original on May 24, 2005.
- Kairuz, Mariano (March 5, 2006). "Cinefilia a mares" [Oceans of cinephilia]. Página 12 (in Spanish). Vol. 9, no. 498. p. 20 – via Internet Archive.
- Keough, Peter (May 6, 2005). "Gay deceivers". Portland Phoenix. Archived from the original on May 20, 2005.
- Lamble, David (July 7, 2005). "Jenni Olson confronts romance and tragedy: The Joy of Life plays at the Castro Theatre". Bay Area Reporter. Vol. 35, no. 27. pp. 29, 34 – via Internet Archive.
- Lamble, David (February 3, 2005). "Queer and incoming: Films to look out for from 2005 Sundance Fest". Bay Area Reporter. Vol. 35, no. 5. pp. 30, 41 – via Internet Archive.
- Lawrence, Julie (October 4, 2005). ""The Joy of Life" documents life and death in San Francisco". OnMilwaukee. Archived from the original on March 12, 2025.
- Leggate, James (January 22, 2024). "Golden Gate Suicide Deterrent Barrier Now Runs Full Span". Engineering News-Record. Archived from the original on January 22, 2024.
- Malkowski, Jennifer (2017). Dying in Full Detail: Mortality and Digital Documentary. Durham: Duke University Press. ISBN 978-0-82236-315-6. LCCN 2016034893.
- Meyers, Michelle (January 28, 2005). "Local filmmakers stretch out at Sundance Film Festival" (PDF). Inside Bay Area. Archived from the original (PDF) on July 24, 2007.
- Moore, Candace (February 7, 2005). "Review of The Joy of Life". AfterEllen. Archived from the original on February 8, 2005.
- Morris, Gary (August 1, 2005). "Crossing the Bridge: Jenni Olson's The Joy of Life (2005)". Bright Lights Film Journal.
- Morris, Wesley (May 8, 2005). "Gay film fest lineup is safe and sincere". Boston Globe. Archived from the original on May 25, 2005 – via Boston.com.
- Moylan, Brian (June 10, 2005). "Silverdocs goes for gold". Washington Blade. Archived from the original on September 8, 2008.
- Nelson, Rob (February 1, 2005). "Lessons of Darkness: Struggling to stay positive, documentarians fight the power, reach for the gold at Sundance". The Village Voice. Archived from the original on March 1, 2005.
- Olson, Jenni (January 27, 2005). "Jenni Olson brings Joy to Park City". Film Threat (Interview). Interviewed by Eric Campos.
- Olson, Jenni (August 2, 2006). "The Joy of Life — Interview With Jenni Olson". ScreenAnarchy (Interview). Interviewed by Michael Guillén.
- Olson, Jenni (January 13, 2005). "Jumping-off point". Bay Area Reporter. Vol. 5, no. 2. p. 37 – via Internet Archive.
- Olson, Jenni (January 14, 2005). "Power Over Life and Death: Another toll goes up on the Golden Gate Bridge". San Francisco Chronicle. Archived from the original on April 4, 2005.
- Polacek, Jeremy (April 24, 2015). "Film". L Magazine. Archived from the original on March 25, 2023.
- Porter, Darwin; Prince, Danforth (February 2006). Blood Moon's Guide to Gay and Lesbian Film (1st ed.). Blood Moon Productions. ISBN 0-974-81-184-X – via Internet Archive.
- Prado, Mark (July 19, 2018) [September 23, 2016]. "Golden Gate Bridge suicide barrier cost could rise to $198M". Marin Independent Journal. Archived from the original on November 5, 2023.
- Rodriguez, Olga R.; Daley, Haven (January 3, 2024). "It took decades, but San Francisco finally installs nets to stop suicides off Golden Gate Bridge". Associated Press. Archived from the original on January 3, 2024.
- Shin, Sangsoo; Pirkis, Jane; Clapperton, Angela; Spittal, Matthew (March 18, 2025). "Change in suicides during and after the installation of barriers at the Golden Gate Bridge". Injury Prevention. 32: 498–500. doi:10.1136/ip-2024-045604. PMC 13217047. PMID 40101955.
- Silva, Patricia (February 13, 2019). "#Crucial21DbW: The Joy of Life directed by Jenni Olson". Directed by Women. Archived from the original on August 9, 2026.
- Stoia, Kate (Summer 2005). "Film Features Local Scenes". Glen Park News. Vol. 23, no. 2. p. 11 – via Internet Archive.
- Suárez, Juan Antonio (July 2024). "Queer Memory and the Brown Commons". In Belmonte Ávila, Juan F.; Encarnación-Pinedo, Estíbaliz (eds.). Unbound Queer Time in Literature, Cinema, and Video Games. New York: Routledge Taylor & Francis Group. pp. 113–131. doi:10.4324/9781003399957-11. ISBN 9781032508504. LCCN 2024020531.
- Szymanski, Zak (January 20, 2005). "Local filmmaker tackles suicide at Golden Gate". Bay Area Reporter. Vol. 35, no. 3. pp. 5, 19 – via Internet Archive.
- Vance, Kelly (June 15, 2005). "Tender is the Gender: Frameline29 is in love with the modern world". East Bay Express. Archived from the original on May 6, 2006.
- Warner, Shayna Maci (May 7, 2021). "Jenni Olson and Desire in the Gay Golden State". The Gay Gaze. Archived from the original on May 7, 2021.
- Yahr, Hariette (February 15, 2005). "Report from Sundance 2005: Documentaries in Action". MediaRights. Archived from the original on March 9, 2005.
