= Citizen Film =

- Type: Nonprofit
- Industry: Documentary, Film, New Media, Storytelling
- Founded: San Francisco, California (2002)
- Headquarters: San Francisco, CA, United States
- Key people: Sam Ball; Sophie Constantinou; Kate Stilley Steiner
- Revenue: 1,089,632 United States dollar (2022)
- Total assets: 276,067 United States dollar (2022)
- Website: https://citizenfilm.org

Citizen Film is a not-for-profit, San Francisco-based documentary company founded in 2002 by Sam Ball, Sophie Constantinou and Kate Stilley Steiner. Citizen Film specializes in producing media that “fosters active engagement in cultural and civic life."

== Documentaries ==
They produce long-form documentary programs such as Joann Sfar Draws from Memory and Green Streets (in progress), and they have produced more than 100 short films. In addition, they provide key production and/or post-production services for independent producers such as Nancy Kates (Regarding Susan Sontag); Vicki Abeles (Race to Nowhere); Tiffany Shlain (The Tribe); and Jenni Olson (575 Castro St.).

Citizen Film collaborated with Academy Award-winner Debra Chasnoff and her nonprofit production company Groundspark on several films. Citizen Film’s Kate Stilley Steiner produced and edited Groundspark’s That’s a Family (2000), One Wedding and a Revolution (2004), Let’s Get Real (2004), It’s Still Elementary (2007), and A Foot in the Door; Sophie Constantinou provided cinematography for One Wedding and a Revolution (2004) and A Foot in the Door. Chasnoff’s final film, Prognosis – notes on living, was co-produced by Citizen Film and Groundspark. After Chasnoff's passing in 2017, GroundSpark's films were transferred to Citizen Film, where they are owned and distributed through the Debra Chasnoff / Groundspark Legacy Initiative.

== New Media ==
Citizen Film also produces new media projects such as Lunch Love Community, co-directed by Constantinou and Helen De Michiel; and Half-Remembered Stories, a collaboration with the San Francisco Jewish Film Festival.
