= Antonia Rey =

Cuban-born American actress (1926–2019)

- Born: Maria Antonia Rey; October 12, 1926; Camajuaní, Villa Clara, Cuba
- Died: February 21, 2019 (aged 92)
- Occupation: Actress
- Years active: 1954–2019
- Spouse: Andres Castro (m. 1958; died 2000)

Maria Antonia Rey (October 12, 1927 – February 21, 2019) was a Cuban-born American actress.

== Life and career ==
Born in Camajuaní and educated in Havana, Rey was the only child of Emilia Rey and dentist Antonio Francesch. Due to her father's premature death, she was given her mother's surname at birth. Over the course of her adolescence, Rey acquired two stepbrothers following her mother's remarriage, to banker Rafael Rangel.

Rey married theatre director Andres Castro in 1958 – during the intermission of a play. Despite offers of prominence in their fields, they chose to flee communist Cuba in 1961.

Rey's Broadway credits include The Rose Tattoo (1995), The Ritz (1975), A Streetcar Named Desire (1973), 42 Seconds from Broadway (1973), The Engagement Baby (1970), Camino Real (1970), Mike Downstairs (1968), and Bajour (1964).

Rey is better known for her cameos in various movies like Kiss Me, Guido (1997), Jacob's Ladder and King of the Gypsies, as well as the TV-movie pilot for Kojak entitled The Marcus-Nelson Murders. She has also appeared in shows such as Who's the Boss?, Third Watch, Law & Order and Law & Order: Criminal Intent.

Rey's final role was Assunta Bianchi, in the television series Happy!; her character dies in the second to last episode of the series, which aired three months after Rey's death, and featured a closing “In Memory” credit dedicated to Rey.

== Filmography ==
=== Film ===
Year	Title	Role	Notes
1968	Coogan's Bluff	Mrs. Amador	
1969	Popi	Mrs. Cruz	
1971	Klute	Mrs. Vasek	
1971	'Doc'	Concha	
1971	Who Killed Mary Whats 'ername?	Waitress	
1971	Who Says I Can't Ride a Rainbow!		
1972	To Find a Man	Modesta	
1974	The Lords of Flatbush	Mrs. Rosiello	
1976	The Money	Pearl	
1978	King of the Gypsies	Danitza Giorgio	
1979	Hair	Mrs. Berger, George's Mother	
1979	Boardwalk	Carmelita	
1980	The Changeling	Estancia	
1981	Time Bandits	Daisy	
1982	The Clairvoyant	Spanish Woman	
1984	Moscow on the Hudson	Counter Woman at McDonald's	
1984	Beat Street	Flora	
1984	Garbo Talks	Esmeralda	
1986	Wise Guys	Aunt Sadie	
1987	Forever, Lulu	Clara	
1987	Spaceballs	Clarie	
1988	White Hot	Market Woman	
1988	Spike of Bensonhurst	Bandanas Mother	
1989	Simple Justice	Mrs. Maria Pajarro	
1990	Jacob's Ladder	Woman on Subway	
1991	True Colors	Soledad	
1991	I Was On Mars	La Mama	
1992	Chain of Desire	Jesus' Mother	
1994	Only You	Fortune Teller	
1994	It Runs in the Family	Gypsy Woman	
1995	Die Hard with a Vengeance	Mrs. Stella	
1995	Tarantella	Grandmother	
1997	Kiss Me, Guido	Josephia Zito	
1997	The Full Monty	Emmy	
1998	The Object of My Affection	Mrs. Ochoa	
1999	Gloria	Tenant	
2001	Piñero	Senora	
2005	The Reality Trap	Consuela	
2014	Match	Mrs. Trujillo	
2015	Alto	Nonna Del Vecchio”	

=== Television ===
Year	Title	Role	Notes
1988–1990	Who's the Boss?	Aunt Rosa	2 episodes
2000–2010	Dora the Explorer	Abuela, Wizzles (voice)	11 episodes
2001–2002	Courage the Cowardly Dog	Maria Ladrones, Space Chicken's Wife (voice)	2 episodes
2017–2019	Happy!	Assunta Bianchi	
