= Tarantella (1995 film) =

- Directed by: Helen De Michiel
- Screenplay by: Helen De Michiel
- Starring: Mira Sorvino; Rose Gregorio; Matthew Lillard; Frank Pellegrino; Stephen Spinella
- Release date: 1995
- Running time: 100 min
- Country: USA
- Language: English

Tarantella is a 1995 drama film directed by Helen De Michiel, starring Mira Sorvino as the main character. The film premiered on June 7, 1995, at the Seattle International Film Festival and was released theatrically in the United States on March 15, 1996.

== Plot ==
Diane Di Sorella, a young Italian American professional photographer, has to return suddenly to New Jersey, where she grew up, when her mother dies to settle her estate. In recent years Diane didn't get on with her, and begins to remember her embittered mother whom she abandoned. But at the same time, she begins to rediscover the heritage she rejected a long time ago when she is amongst her neighbours while packing up the house. Then she meets a close friend of her grandmother's and late mother's, who gives her support in this tough time and also gives Diane her mother's last gift: a secret journal kept by her mother. As it is written in Italian the woman must read it to Diane. This helps her learn more about her mother's history, and as she does so she finally comes to terms with the relationship they had and her own Italian heritage.

== Cast ==
- Mira Sorvino as Diane
- Rose Gregorio as Pina
- Matthew Lillard as Matt
- Frank Pellegrino as Lou
- Stephen Spinella as Frank
- Maryann Urbano as Mother
- Antonia Rey as Grandmother
- Melissa Maxwell as Young Diana
- Magda Lang as Home Buyer Woman
- Sean Baldwin as Home Buyer Man
- Derek Vontreras as Home Buyer Young Man
- A.J. Lopez as Home Buyer Young Man
- Gaetano Lisco as Father
- Carol Dante as Tarantella Dancer
- Andrew M. Fuchs as Tarentella Trio

== See also ==
- Tarantella
