= Debra Chasnoff =

American filmmaker (1957–2017)

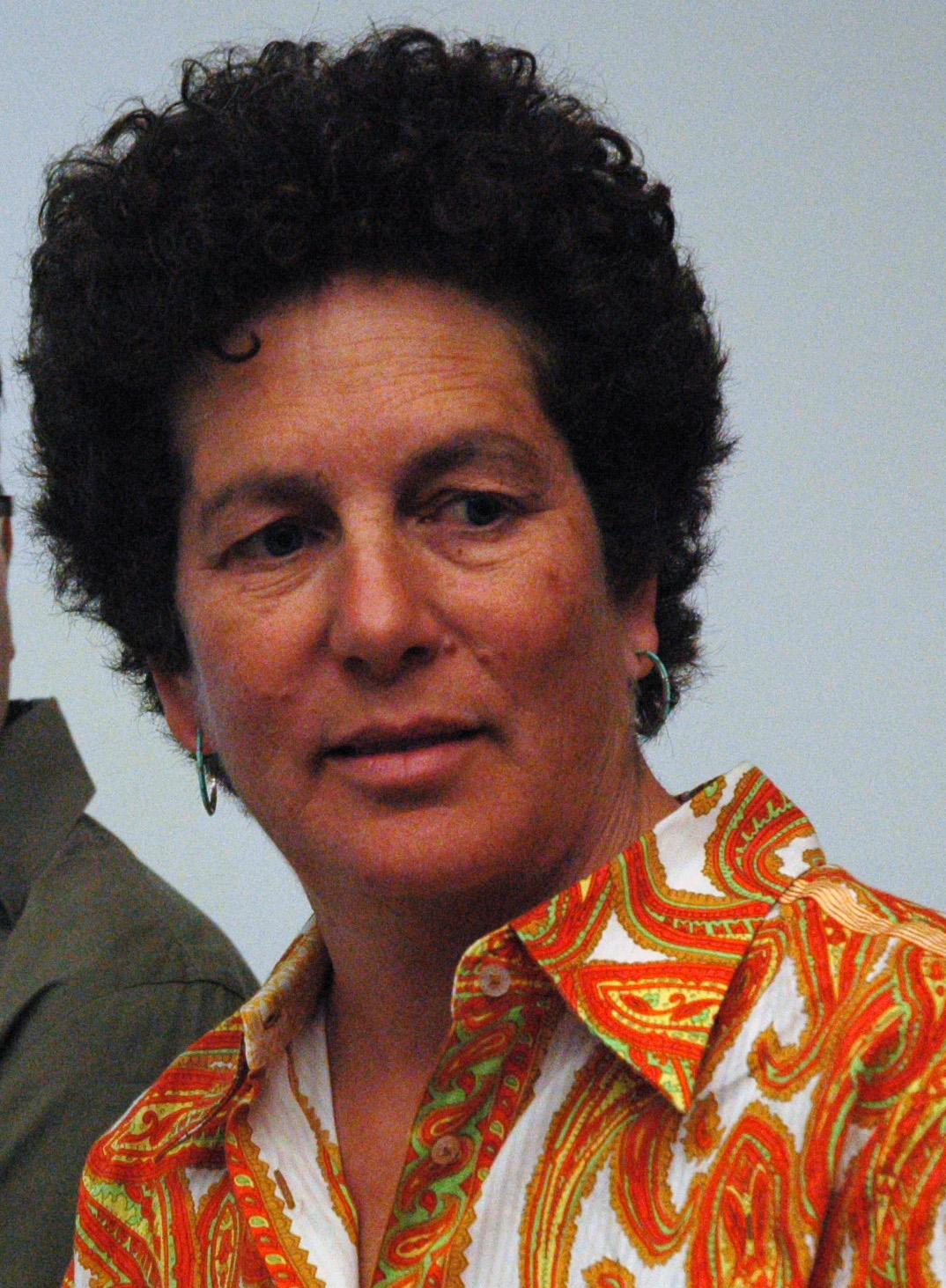
Chasnoff in 2010

Debra Chasnoff (October 12, 1957 – November 7, 2017) was an American documentary filmmaker and activist whose films address progressive social justice issues. Her production company GroundSpark produces and distributes films, educational resources and campaigns on issues ranging from environmental concerns to affordable housing to preventing prejudice.

== Early life and education ==
Debra Chasnoff was born October 12, 1957, in Philadelphia. Chasnoff grew up in a secular Jewish family in a Maryland suburb of Washington, D.C., with her parents and younger sister, Lori. She attended Wellesley College in Wellesley, Massachusetts, where she studied economics. For a brief time after college, Chasnoff worked as a telecommunications rate analyst representing clients with roles in the nuclear weapons industry. Chasnoff quit the profession because her job was not in line with her social activism beliefs and aspirations, and began her career as a social activist and media producer.

== Professional career ==
Chasnoff was the senior producer and president of GroundSpark. GroundSpark's mission was to "create films and dynamic education campaigns that move individuals and communities to take action for a more just world." GroundSpark's Respect for All Project sought "to create safe, hate-free schools and communities" through documentaries and accompanying educational campaigns. After Chasnoff's passing, GroundSpark's film catalog was transferred to Citizen Film for hosting and dissemination through the Debra Chasnoff / GroundSpark Legacy Initiative.

She was a visiting scholar in public policy at Mills College and a frequent lecturer on college campuses across the country. She was a Woodrow Wilson Visiting Fellow. Chasnoff had been a member and owner of the film distribution company New Day Films since 1996 and served as chair of New Day's Steering Committee twice. She was appointed by Mayor Art Agnos to the San Francisco Film and Video Arts Commission, where she also served as vice chair. She served on the advisory board of Frameline (the San Francisco International Lesbian and Gay Film Festival), Jewish Voice for Peace, and Power Up.

== Film career ==
Chasnoff directed and/or produced twelve films in the United States since her filmmaking career began in 1984. Chasnoff directed and co-produced Choosing Children in 1984 with her partner at the time, Kim Klausner. This film explored same-sex parenting and helped launch a profound cultural shift regarding parenting in the LGBTQ community. Choosing Children showcased six families composed of same-sex parents and children brought into the family through adoption, donor insemination, foster parenting, and through previous relationships.

In 1991 Chasnoff directed and produced Deadly Deception: General Electric, Nuclear Weapons and Our Environment. This film targeted General Electric (GE), the multinational military corporation, proprietor of the National Broadcasting Company (NBC) and the Radio Corporation of America (RCA), and a producer of components for nuclear weapons. In 1992 Chasnoff won an Academy Award for Deadly Deception and thanked her then partner, Kim Klausner, in her acceptance speech, and by doing so she “came out” to the public as a lesbian.

Chasnoff co-directed Homes and Hands—Community Land Trusts in Action in 1998 with Helen S. Cohen. This film explores housing and community development in the United States and asks local communities to explore models of creating affordable housing.

In 1999 Chasnoff directed and co-produced, with Helen Cohen, Wired for What? a film about technology in education. An edited version of this film aired on PBS in 2000 in the PBS series Digital Divide—Teachers, Technology, and the Classroom. This film examines computerization of education to see how technology impacts students' creativity and learning efficiency.

Chasnoff directed and co-produced One Wedding and a Revolution in 2004 with Kate Stilley Steiner. This nineteen-minute-long film details the political decision made by San Francisco Mayor Gavin Newsom to issue same-sex marriage licenses for a short time in early 2004.

Chasnoff's organization Groundspark has produced several films as a part of its Respect for All Project. The series includes the following films, all directed and produced by Chasnoff: Straightlaced—How Gender's Got Us All Tied Up, It's Elementary—Talking About Gay Issues in School, It's STILL Elementary, Let's Get Real, and That's a Family! It's Elementary—Talking About Gay Issues in School (1996), co-produced by Helen Cohen, illuminates how all young people are affected by anti-gay stigma, and has helped schools all over the world address anti-gay prejudice in the classroom. That's a Family! (2000) highlights a wide range of family structures such as multiracial families, families with same-sex parents, and single parent families. This film examines diversity from a child's perspective and was screened at the White House to an audience of more than 100 leaders of national children's, family, education and civil rights organizations in December 2000. That's a Family!, executive produced by Helen Cohen, has been widely praised by those supporting its role in diversity education but also widely attacked by conservative organizations that consider it to be gay propaganda and inappropriate for a young audience. Let's Get Real, co-produced by Helen Cohen, is an exploration of bullying in middle schools released in 2003. It's STILL Elementary considers the effects and political history of It's Elementary. Straightlaced—How Gender's Got us All Tied Up explores the ways that teenagers are affected by pressures to conform to gender norms.

Chasnoff also produced and directed Celebrating the Life of Del Martin which captures the moving memorial celebration for lesbian pioneer Del Martin who died in 2008. A Foot in the Door, directed by Chasnoff and produced with Kate Stilley Steiner, is a short (16 minute) documentary showcasing Kindergarten to College, the first universal children's college savings account program in the United States.

== Personal life and death ==
Married to Nancy Otto, a glass blowing artist and a non-profit fundraising consultant, Chasnoff had two sons, by her former partner, Kim Klausner: Noah Klausner Chasnoff (born 1988) and Oscar Chasnoff Klausner (born 1994).

Chasnoff died on November 7, 2017, at her San Francisco home, aged 60, from breast cancer.

== Filmography ==
- Choosing Children (1984) Director/Producer/Editor*
- Deadly Deception: General Electric, Nuclear Weapons and Our Environment (1991) Director/Producer*
- It's Elementary: Talking About Gay Issues in School (1996) Director/Producer
- Homes and Hands: Community Land Trusts in Action (1998) Co-director
- Wired for What? (1999) Director/Producer
- That's a Family! (2000) Director/Producer
- Let's Get Real (2003) Director/Producer
- One Wedding and a Revolution (2004) Director/Producer
- It's STILL Elementary (2007) Director/Producer
- Straightlaced: How Gender's Got Us All Tied Up (2009) Director/Producer
- Celebrating the Life of Del Martin (2011) Director/Producer
- A Foot in the Door (2012) Director/Producer
- Prognosis: Notes on Living (2021) Co-director (released posthumously)

== Awards, honors, and nominations ==
For Let's Get Real:

- Best Short Documentary, Columbine Award, Moondance International Film Festival (Finalist, Best Short Documentary)
- International Family Film Festival (Certificate of Merit, Rochester International Film Festival)
- 2005 Notable Children's Video, American Library Association
- 2005 Parents' Choice Silver Award

For That's a family:

- CINE Golden Eagle Master Series Award, Non-Broadcast Films
- First Place, National Council on Family Relations Media Awards
- Best Documentary, San Francisco International Lesbian and Gay Film Festival
- Audience Award, Best Short Film, Barcelona Gay and Lesbian Film Festival
- Best Short Documentary, Santa Clarita International Film Festival
- Best Short Documentary, Burbank International Children's Film Festival

For It's Elementary:

- CINE Golden Eagle
- Outstanding Film Documentary, GLAAD Media Award
- Multicultural Media Award, National Association for Multicultural Education
- Best Documentary, Chicago International Lesbian and Gay Film Festival
- Best Documentary, Pittsburgh International Gay and Lesbian Film Festival
- Best Documentary, Santa Barbara Lesbian and Gay Film Festival
- Best Documentary, Santa Fe Lesbian and Gay International Film Festival
- Best Documentary, San Francisco Lesbian and Gay International Film Festival
- Best Documentary, Turin (Italy ) International Gay and Lesbian Film Festival
- Juror's Choice Award, Charlotte Film Festival
- Audience Award, Austin Gay and Lesbian International Film Festival
- Best Educational Film, Northern Lights (Alaska) International Film Festival
- Best Feature Audience Award, Barcelona International Lesbian and Gay Film Festival
- Silver Apple, National Educational Media Network
- Silver Spire, Golden Gate Awards, San Francisco International Film Festival
- Honorable Mention, Milan Lesbian and Gay Film Festival
- Honor Award, Skipping Stones

For One Wedding & A Revolution:

- Best Women's Short, Cleveland International Film Festival
- Special Jury Prize, Barcelona International Gay and Lesbian Film Festival
- Best Short Documentary, Fire Island Film and Video Festival
- Audience Favorite, Fresno Gay and Lesbian Film Festival
- Audience Favorite, Pikes Peak Lavender Film Festival
- Audience Favorite and Best Short Film, Santa Barbara Gay and Lesbian Film Festival
- Best Short Documentary, Long Island Gay and Lesbian Film Festival

For Home and Hands:

- CINE Golden Eagle
- Silver Apple, National Educational Film and Video Festival
- Certificate of Creative Excellence, US International Film and Video Festival

For Deadly Deception:

- Academy Award, Best Documentary Short Subject
- Red Ribbon, American Film and Video Festival
- CINE Golden Eagle
- Grand Prize, Ambiente-Incontri International Film Festival on Nature & Environment
- Gold Hugo, Chicago International Film Festival
- Best of Category (Issues of War and Peace), Best of Festival and People's Choice, EarthPeace
- International Film Festival
- Jury Award, New York Expo of Short Film and Video
- First Place (Independent), Marin County National Film and Video Festival
- Silver Apple, National Educational Film and Video Festival
- Promotional Prize, City of Freiburg, Okomedia International Ecological Film Festival
- Honorable Mention, Black Maria Film Festival
- Honorable Mention, Louisville Film and Video Festival
- Honorable Mention, Golden Gate Awards, San Francisco International Film Festival

For Choosing Children:

- Red Ribbon, American Film Festival
- Best Documentary, New England Film Festival
- Best Short Documentary, New York Gay and Lesbian Film Festival
- First Prize, National Educational Film Festival
- Second Place, National Council on Family Relations
