= Deadly Deception: General Electric, Nuclear Weapons and Our Environment =

1991 film

- Film poster
- Directed by: Debra Chasnoff
- Produced by: Debra Chasnoff
- Production company: Women's Educational Media
- Distributed by: INFACT
- Release date: 1991
- Running time: 27 minutes
- Country: United States
- Language: English

Deadly Deception: General Electric, Nuclear Weapons and Our Environment is a 1991 American short documentary film directed by Debra Chasnoff. It won an Oscar at the 64th Academy Awards in 1992 for Documentary Short Subject. It focuses on General Electric's role in producing nuclear weapons.

== See also ==
- List of films about nuclear issues
