= The Royal Road =

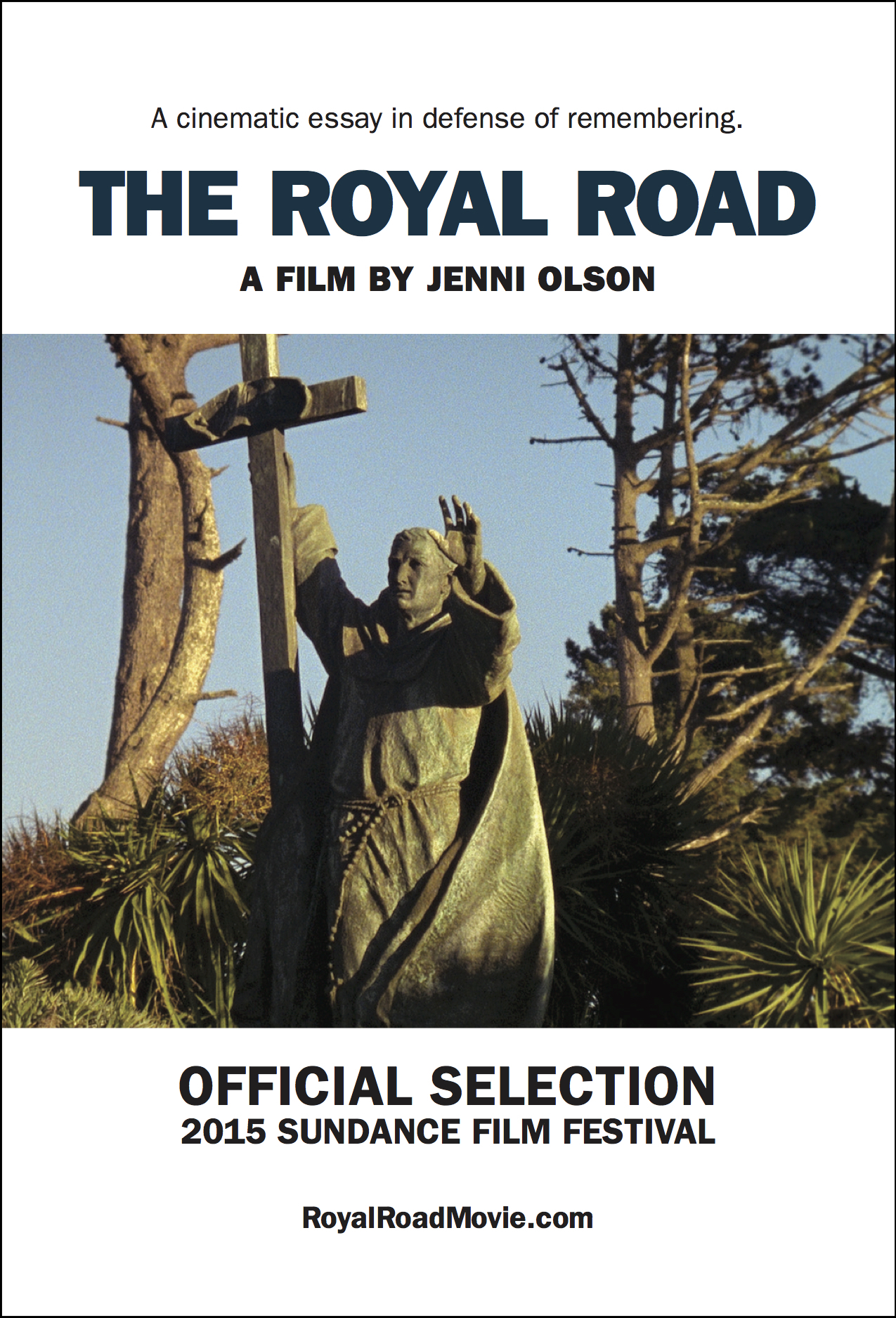
- Directed by: Jenni Olson
- Narrated by: Jenni Olson
- Release date: January 23, 2015 (Sundance)
- Running time: 65 minutes
- Country: United States
- Language: English

The Royal Road is a 2015 documentary film directed by Jenni Olson. The film premiered in the New Frontier section of the 2015 Sundance Film Festival. In the film's voiceover, Olson reflects on her butch identity and experiences of unrequited love. The film went on to earn the award for Best LGBTQ Film at the 2015 Ann Arbor Film Festival. Consisting entirely of 16mm urban landscape shots and a lyrical stream of consciousness voiceover, the film touches on a wide range of topics from reflections on classic Hollywood film to the history of the Spanish colonization of California and the Mexican American War.

A voice-over cameo appearance by Pulitzer Prize-winning playwright Tony Kushner serves as the centerpiece for the film's focal point segment entitled, "In Defense of Nostalgia." Jenni Olsen states that "In the same way that outdoorsy people experience feelings of calm and wholeness from spending time in nature, there are also those of us who discover a profound serenity in the man-made environment of yesterday."

== Production ==
Olson cited Sherman's March and Alfred Hitchcock's Vertigo as influences. San Francisco Film Society was the film's fiscal sponsor. The film had its Bay Area premiere on April 29, 2015, at the SFFS's San Francisco International Film Festival. Olson also crowdfunded $24,038 towards the production of the film. Olson's wife, Julie Dorf, produced the film.

== Reception ==
Of the film, Dennis Harvey wrote in Variety that "The pic could hardly be smaller or quieter by conventional standards, assembly on all levels is serenely accomplished."
