= Frank Pellegrino (actor) =

American actor (1944–2017)

- Born: Frank Joseph Pellegrino; May 19, 1944; East Harlem, New York, U.S.
- Died: January 31, 2017 (aged 72); Manhattan, New York, U.S.
- Occupations: Actor; restaurateur
- Years active: 1989–2015

Frank Joseph Pellegrino (May 19, 1944 – January 31, 2017) was an American actor and restaurateur.

== Early life and education ==
Born in East Harlem on May 19, 1944, to father Frank, a truck driver, and mother, Ida (née Puccillo), a seamstress, Pellegrino graduated from Oceanside High School and Pace College (now Pace University).

== Career ==
Pellegrino has often acted in law and gangster-themed film and television productions. He was a member of an early 1960s singing group called the Holidaes. Notable acting roles include Johnny Dio in Goodfellas, assorted appearances on Dick Wolf's Law & Order, and FBI Chief Frank Cubitoso on The Sopranos.

Pellegrino was a co-owner of the restaurant Rao's in New York City. Books written by Pellegrino include Rao's Cookbook, Rao's Recipes from the Neighborhood and Rao's on the Grill. He also produced the CD An Evening at Rao's, featuring music from Rao's jukebox.

== Death ==
Pellegrino died from lung cancer on January 31, 2017, in Manhattan. He was 72.

== Filmography ==
=== Film ===
Year	Title	Role	Notes
1990	Goodfellas	Johnny Dio	
1993	Manhattan Murder Mystery	Policeman	
1993	Mr. Wonderful	Man In Elevator	
1994	Angie	Uncle Marty	
1994	It Could Happen to You	Water's Edge Maitre D'	
1995	Tarantella	Lou	
1997	Silent Predator	Frank Cardelli	
1997	Cop Land	The Mayor	
1998	Celebrity	Frankie	
1999	Mickey Blue Eyes	Sante	
1999	18 Shades of Dust	Eddie Baggs	
2001	Friends & Family	Mr. Torcelli	
2001	Knockaround Guys	Joey Hook	
2003	Happy End	Bernie	
2005	Searching for Bobby D	John Argano Sr.	
2005	Brooklyn Lobster	Judge Astarita	
2005	Carlito's Way: Rise to Power	Crooning Wiseguy	Video
2006	Artie Lange's Beer League	Gina's Dad	
2012	Delivering the Goods	Mr. Quentin	

=== Television ===
Year	Title	Role	Notes
1990	Kojak: None So Blind	Bamonte	Television film
1991	Counterstrike	Luca	Episode: "Going Home"
1993	Love, Honor & Obey: The Last Mafia Marriage	Johnny	Television film
1994–1995	New York Undercover	Detective Ricciarelli	16 episodes
1995	The City	Joseph Soleito Sr.	7 episodes
1995–1999	Law & Order	Tony / Mr. Contini	2 episodes
1996	On Seventh Avenue	Romeo Vega, Attorney	Television film
1996	Swift Justice	Carruthers	4 episodes
1996	Gotti	Carmine "Baby Carmine" Russo	Television film
1997	F/X: The Series	Vincent Capriccio	Episode: "Unfinished Business"
1998	Rear Window	Physical Therapist	Television film
1999–2004	The Sopranos	Frank Cubitoso	11 episodes
2001	Big Apple	Howard Klein	5 episodes
2002	Law & Order: Criminal Intent	Carl Pettijohn	Episode: "Homo Homini Lupus"
2015	Odd Mom Out	Ronaldo	Episode: "Wheels Down"
