= Kate Stilley Steiner =

American documentary filmmaker

Kate Stilley Steiner is an American filmmaker, editor, and producer who has worked in documentary filmmaking since 1990. She co-founded Citizen Film, a San Francisco-based not-for-profit production company which "creates films and online media that foster active engagement in cultural and civic life." Stilley's work has been broadcast on PBS, ABC, NBC, The Learning Channel, and Fox.

Stilley co-founded Citizen Film in 2002 with Sam Ball and Sophie Constantinou. She has produced a number of films with Citizen Film, including Throwing Curves: Eva Zeisel (2002), Balancing Acts: A Jewish Theater in the Soviet Union (2009), and American Creed (2018). She edited Wendy MacNaughton Draws the Castro Commons (2012), People of the Graphic Novel (2012), and served as consulting editor on PBS broadcast Joann Sfar Draws from Memory (2012). Kate Stilley collaborated with brother and artist Tucker Stilley and the Cohort of Disembodied Artists to produce and curate “Palimpsessed,” an art exhibit on Virtual Ability Island in Second Life.

From 1999 through 2021, Stilley worked on a number of films with Academy Award-winning director Debra Chasnoff and her production company GroundSpark. In 1999, she edited Wired For What? as part of the PBS series Digital Divide which examines elementary schools grappling with computerization. In 2000, Stilley edited That’s a Family!, which features children living in diverse family structures in the United States. The film was screened at the White House to an audience of more than 100 leaders of national children’s, family, education and civil rights organizations. In 2004, Stilley produced and edited One Wedding and a Revolution, a short film documenting the first legal marriage of a same-sex couple in California between lesbian activists Del Martin and Phyllis Lyon. In the same year, Stilley produced and edited Let’s Get Real, which is used in classrooms across the United States to broach multicultural education and prevent bullying. In 2007, she produced and edited It’s Still Elementary, sequel to the original It’s Elementary: Talking About Gay Issues In School. In 2021, Stilley produced and co-directed Prognosis – Notes on Living, her final collaboration with director Debra Chasnoff as the pair documented Chasnoff's journey with stage-4 metastatic breast cancer. Following Chasnoff's passing, Stilley founded the Debra Chasnoff / Groundspark Legacy Initiative at Citizen Film, which inherited GroundSpark’s catalog of films and engagement campaigns.

Kate Stilley Steiner serves on the board of directors of the Golden Gate Symphony Orchestra and Chorus, alongside her husband, musical director Urs Leonhardt Steiner. Citizen Film and GGSOC have collaborated on creative projects together including "Milk Barn," stories from the Swiss Alps, "Scoul Classics" about the classical music festival in the Swiss Alps, and multimedia Holocaust awareness project "Songs of Truth.”

Stilley's other editing credits include work on the award-winning documentaries: The Story Of Mothers and Daughters for ABC Television; Fox Television's Emmy Award-winning Loyalty and Betrayal: The Story Of The American Mob; and the Academy Award-nominated Freedom On My Mind.
