= Scott Foundas =

American film critic

- Education: Henry B. Plant High School; University of Southern California
- Occupations: Film critic, writer, journalist, studio executive
- Writing career
- Language: English
- Genres: Film criticism, journalism

Scott Foundas (born c. 1978) is an American film critic, journalist, writer and film studio executive.

Foundas has written film criticism for such publications as Variety, Film Comment, The Village Voice and LA Weekly.

== Life and career ==
In 1994, at age 15, while still a student at Henry B. Plant High School, the St. Petersburg Times hired Foundas as their film critic.

Foundas became a film critic for Variety after writing a letter to the editor that Variety printed and editor Todd McCarthy called Foundas and offered to let him write a few film reviews on speculation. Foundas went on to work as a freelance writer for Variety for close to a decade.

Foundas also studied film production at the University of Southern California.

In addition to film criticism, Foundas has been a recurrent juror, reporter, moderator and film programmer at film festivals such as the Florida Film Festival, Sundance Film Festival and Cannes Film Festival.

Foundas has also worked with Santa Monica radio station KCRW in covering the film industry.

In 2015, Foundas quit his position as chief critic at Variety and moved from New York to Los Angeles after being hired as an acquisition executive for Amazon Studios.
