= Helen De Michiel =

American director and producer

- Born: November 28, 1953 (age 72)
- Occupations: Director; Producer; Activist; Author

Helen De Michiel (born November 28, 1953) is an American director, producer, media arts advocate, strategist and author whose work includes film, television, multimedia installation and digital transmedia.

== Biography ==
As a producer, director and writer, her work includes the dramatic feature film Tarantella (1995, starring Mira Sorvino) that toured festivals worldwide and was broadcast nationally on the public television series Independent Lens in 1997. Her documentary: Turn Here Sweet Corn (1990) was broadcast on the PBS series POV in 1993 and continues to be in educational distribution for environmental organizers. As artist-in-residence, she has created participatory media installations, including The Listening Project (1994) for the Walker Art Center and Paying Attention (2003) for the Exploratorium in San Francisco. Her documentary, The Gender Chip Project (2006) was created in an innovative participatory process with a cohort of young women studying science, technology, engineering and mathematics, and is distributed by Women Make Movies. Lunch Love Community (2014), her transmedia episodic documentary co-directed with Sophie Constantinou, documents the evolution of school lunch reform in Berkeley.

De Michiel was a member of the Peabody Awards Board of Jurors from 2001 to 2007.

== Awards ==
De Michiel has received a fellowship from the Rockefeller Foundation and the Bush Foundation. Her 1988 video essay, Consider Anything, Only Don’t Cry, received the "Best New Vision" Golden Gate Award at the 1989 San Francisco International Film Festival.
