= John Stilley Carpenter =

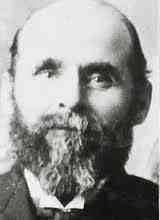
- Born: 11 February 1849; Centreville, Delaware
- Died: 3 January 1925 (age 75); Kanab, Utah
- Known for: Utah pioneer and LDS Church official

John Stilley Carpenter (11 February 1849 at Centreville, Delaware – 3 January 1925 at Kanab, Utah) was a pioneer settler of Utah and fifth bishop of the LDS Church in Glendale, Utah (Kanab Stake) in Kane County, Utah.

== Church and civil works ==
John Stilley Carpenter's family traveled via covered wagon train to Utah in 1857, crossing the Great Plains in Jacob Hoffhein's company. They first located in Salt Lake City. In 1866 Carpenter was ordained an Elder and was sent to the Missouri River to serve as a Church teamster assisting emigrants. In 1868 he was called to the Muddy Mission (located in present-day Nevada), where he remained until that mission was disbanded in 1871. He then settled permanently in Glendale, Utah. On 4 August 1877 Apostle Erastus Snow ordained Carpenter as a High Priest. In 1879 Carpenter became first counselor to Glendale Bishop Royal J. Cutler, which position he held until Cutler died in 1894. In September 1894 he became first counselor to Bishop Moses D. Harris, which position he held until March 1898. After that he served eight years as a member of the High Council. In 1908 Apostle Francis M. Lyman ordained him as Bishop of the Glendale Ward; he served for five years. From 1881 to 1883 he filled a mission to the Southern states, serving part of the time as a conference president. For 25 years he served as a director in the Glendale Irrigation Company, and for 22 years was a member of the district school board.

== Personal ==
Carpenter was a son of John Steele Carpenter and his wife Margaret McCullough, of New Castle County, Delaware. The Carpenter line descended from James Carpenter (c. 1666 - c. 1738) of Accomack County, Virginia and Sussex County, Delaware. On 1 February 1877 John Stilley Carpenter married Margaret E. Cutler (29 July 1860 - 12 September 1880); they had two children. On 10 January 1890 he married Ann Elizabeth Hopkins (February 1867 - ); they had four children.
