= Julie Dorf =

American human rights activist (born 1965)

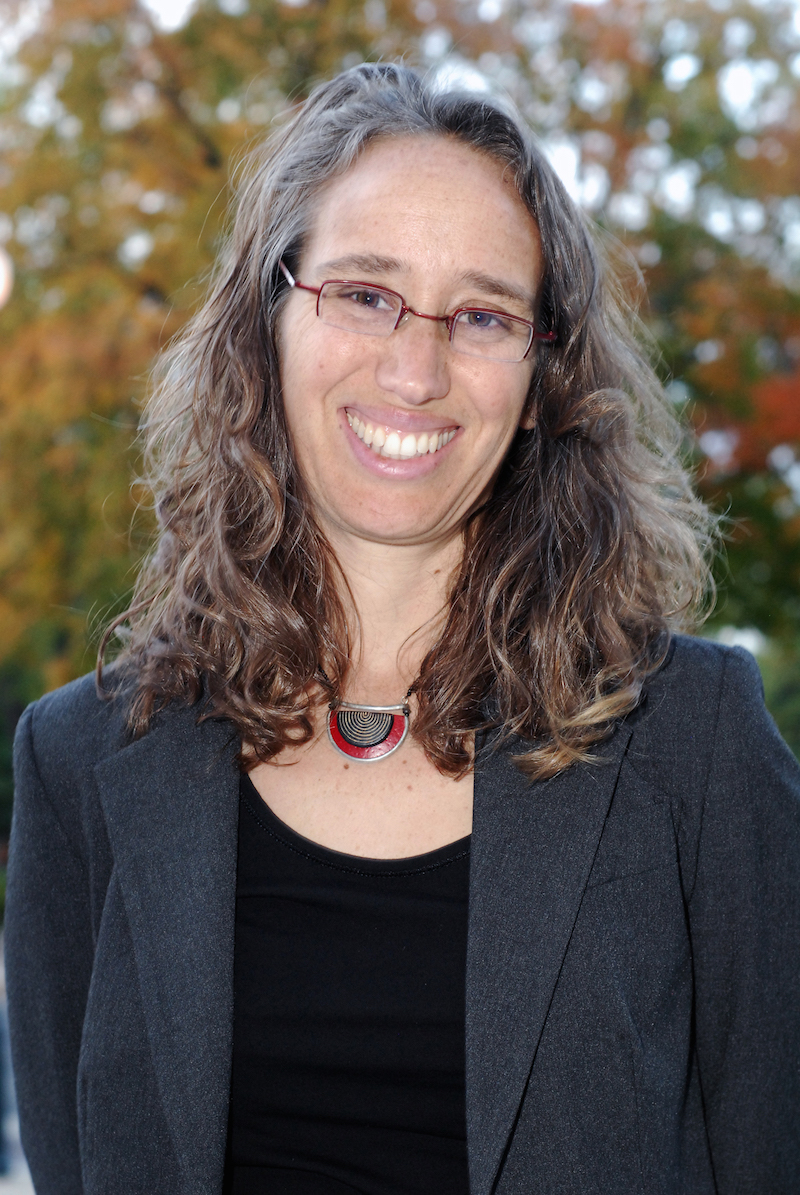
Julie Dorf, Senior Advisor for the Council for Global Equality

Julie Dorf (born February 28, 1965) is an international human rights advocate best known as the founding executive director of OutRight Action International (then known as the International Gay and Lesbian Human Rights Commission). She started the organization in 1990 and served as executive director until 2000.

== Career ==
As scholar Ryan Thoreson describes in his book Transnational LGBT Activism, Dorf "built the organization from a grassroots group in the style of ACT-UP or Queer Nation into a more professional 501(c)(3) that became an authoritative source for information about LGBT rights globally."

Dorf was subsequently on staff at the Horizons Foundation, a San Francisco Bay Area LGBTQ philanthropic organization before becoming a senior advisor at the Council for Global Equality, an organization she helped create and which advocates for LGBTQ-inclusive American foreign policy.

In her role as an LGBTQ rights activist, Dorf has co-founded the Pink Triangle Coalition on reparations for homosexual victims of Nazi persecution, helped to establish the Astraea Lesbian Foundation for Justice International Fund for Sexual Minorities, and implemented the Russia Freedom Fund to assist LGBTQ activists in the former Soviet Union battling anti-gay laws. She has served as an independent consultant for the World Professional Association for Transgender Health (WPATH), Open Society Institute, Global Fund for Women, Arcus Foundation, and Fenton Communications/J-Street Project. Julie currently serves on the board of directors of PowerPAC+; on the advisory boards of OutRight Action International and the LGBT Rights Program at Human Rights Watch; as well as on the Northern California Finance Committee of J-Street. Previously she served on the boards of the Bay Area Council for Soviet Jews (then known as the Bay Area Council for Jewish Rescue and Renewal), the Intersex Society of North America (ISNA) and Freedom to Marry.

Dorf is a Wesleyan University alumnus with a B.A. in Russian and Soviet Studies.
