= Jenni Olson =

American filmmaker (born 1962)

- Olson in 2015
- Born: October 6, 1962 (age 64); Falcon Heights, Minnesota, U.S.
- Education: University of Minnesota
- Occupations: Film curator, filmmaker, author, LGBT film historian
- Notable work: Co-founder of LGBT website PlanetOut.com, Co-founder of the Minneapolis/St.Paul Lesbian, Gay, Bi & Transgender Film Festival

Jenni Olson (born October 6, 1962) is a writer, archivist, historian, consultant, and non-fiction filmmaker based in Berkeley, California. She co-founded the pioneering LGBT website PlanetOut.com. Her two feature-length essay films — The Joy of Life (2005) and The Royal Road (2015) — premiered at the Sundance Film Festival.

Olson's work as an experimental filmmaker and her expansive personal collection of LGBTQ film prints and memorabilia were acquired in April 2020 by the Harvard Film Archive, and her reflection on the last 30 years of LGBT film history was published as a chapter in The Oxford Handbook of Queer Cinema from Oxford University Press in 2021. In 2020, she was named to the Out Magazine Out 100 list. In 2021, she was recognized with the prestigious Special TEDDY Award at the Berlin Film Festival. She also campaigned to have a barrier erected on the Golden Gate Bridge to prevent suicides. Since 2021, Olson has led the Social Media Safety Program at GLAAD.

== Biography ==
Olson was born and raised in Falcon Heights, Minnesota, and was educated at the University of Minnesota where she earned her degree in Film Studies. In 1986, while still a student, Olson co-founded the Minneapolis/St.Paul Lesbian, Gay, Bi & Transgender Film Festival, initially under the name Lavender Images. Olson was inspired in this move by Vito Russo's book, The Celluloid Closet. In 1992, Olson was hired by the company Frameline and moved to San Francisco to work as guest curator on the San Francisco International Lesbian and Gay Film Festival, before being appointed co-director alongside Mark Finch. After three years, Olson left this position to co-found the website PlanetOut.com. Olson worked as director of entertainment and e-commerce for the site, as well fulfilling the same roles for Gay.com. She created the PopcornQ section of the PlanetOut.com website, basing the section on her book The Ultimate Guide to Lesbian & Gay Film and Video.

In 1997, Olson attended the Sundance Festival and arranged, along with Outfest executive director Morgan Rumpf, a small brunch aimed at fellow queer attendees. The event has happened annually since then being co-presented by PlanetOut.com and Outfest until 2005. Since the demise of PlanetOut, it is now presented solely by Outfest. The sponsors described it in 2005 as "the premiere gay and lesbian industry event during Sundance". By March 2005, Olson was named Director of E-Commerce & Consumer Marketing for Wolfe Video/Wolfe Releasing.

In 2021, she was recognized with the Special TEDDY Award at the Berlin Film Festival— for her service to the LGBTQ film community.

Olson is currently co-director of The Bressan Project, devoted to restoring and re-releasing the films of pioneering gay filmmaker Arthur J. Bressan Jr. Her work as a film historian includes the Lambda Literary Award-nominated The Queer Movie Poster Book and her many vintage movie trailer presentations (Homo Promo, Afro Promo, etc.). Jenni's film criticism has appeared in numerous publications including Filmmaker Magazine, The Advocate, and the San Francisco Bay Guardian and she is currently a film columnist for Logo TV's NewNowNext.

In July 2021, Olson also joined GLAAD to lead their Social Media Safety Program.

== Career ==
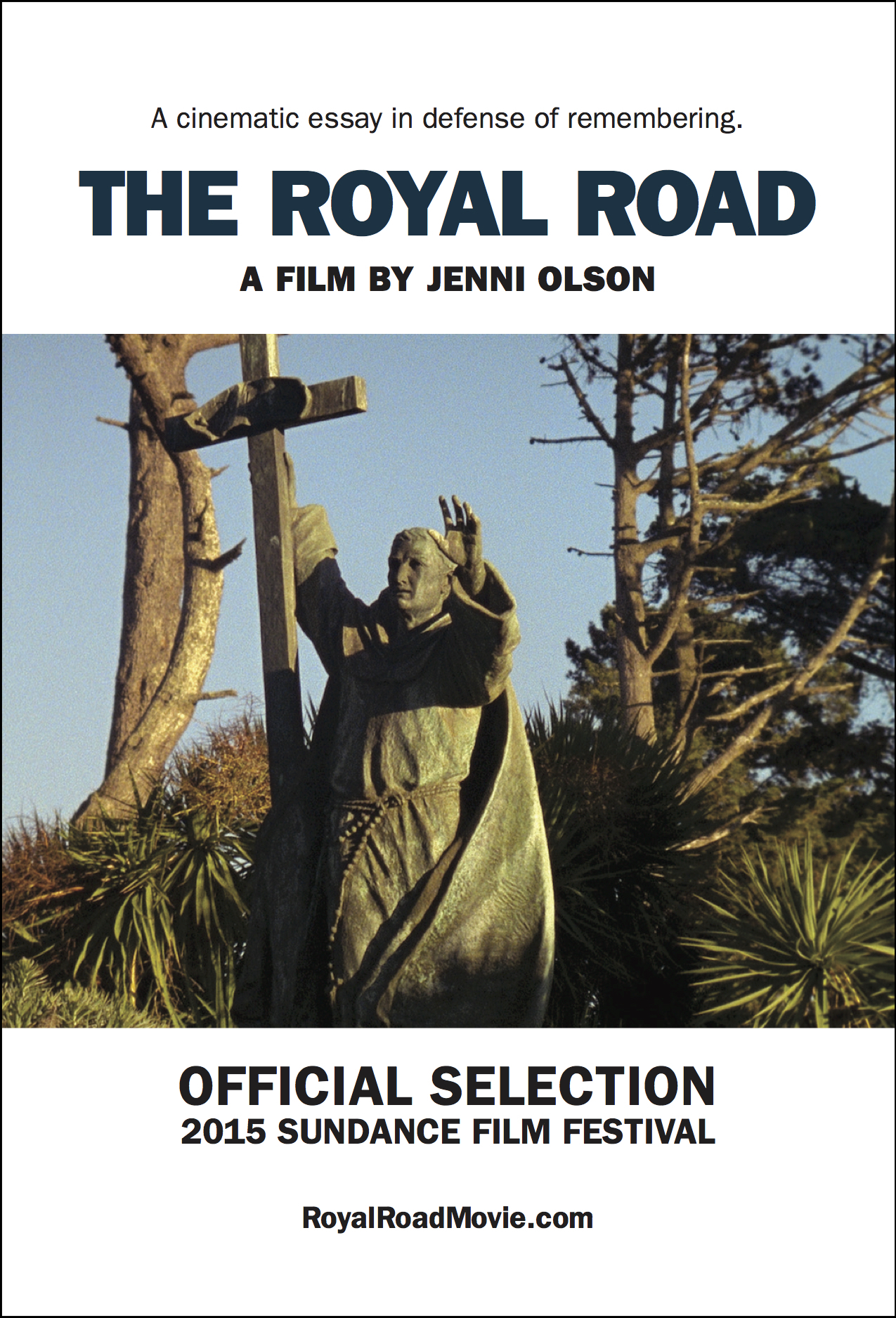
The Royal Road (2015)

Olson initially compiled trailers into documentary features, showing Homo Promo, her compilation of vintage gay movie trailers at the Amsterdam Gay & Lesbian Film Festival in 1991, and her work in this area has been recognised as instructional in teaching students contextualisation.

She continued compiling trailers throughout the 1990s, with her last such compilation released to date being Bride of Trailer Camp, released in 2001 (others in the series include: "Trailer Camp", "Neo Homo Promo", "Afro Promo", "Trailers Schmailers"). During this period Olson also wrote Ultimate Guide to Lesbian & Gay Film and Video (1996). The book was based on Olson's BA thesis. Her next book was The Queer Movie Poster Book (Chronicle Books, 2005). This book was suggested in 1991 by Stuart Marshall, who recommended Olson pitch the idea to London's Gay Men's Press. Although the book was turned down by both them and Serpent's Tail, to whom the idea was pitched as a follow-up to her previous book, Olson was eventually commissioned to write the book in 2002 (published in 2005, it went on to be a Lambda Literary Awards nominee). Olson based the work in part on her own collection of such material, which she has subsequently donated to San Francisco’s GLBT Historical Society. Her collection was exhibited at the San Francisco Public Library in 2004, with Olson delivering an accompanying lecture.

In 2005, Olson released The Joy of Life, her debut feature, which won Best Outstanding Artistic Achievement at the 2005 Outfest and at the 2005 Newfest received Best U.S. Narrative Screenplay, and has been favorably reviewed in a number of publications. It garnered Olson the Marlon Riggs Award by the San Francisco Film Critics Circle in 2005. Working on the film led Olson to pen an open letter to the San Francisco Chronicle on the matter of the Golden Gate Bridge's position as the top suicide landmark in the world. Her former colleague, Mark Finch, had jumped from the bridge on January 14, 1995, and Olson used this event to inform her own film. Her letter was published on the tenth anniversary of Finch's death and supported the Psychiatric Foundation of Northern California's launching of a campaign for a barrier to be installed on the bridge. Olson also distributed her film to the bridge's board of directors, noting "several of the bridge directors told me they appreciated seeing the film and found it illuminating", and in March 2005, the board voted to explore the installation of a barrier to prevent jumping.

Olson's 2009 short film, 575 Castro St. was shot on the empty Castro Camera store set of the Academy Award-winning drama Milk.

In 2015, Olson's film, The Royal Road premiered at the 2015 Sundance Film Festival.

In 2019, Olson directed a short film, In nomine Patris. She is currently in development on an experimental film, The Quiet World.

Olson's work as an experimental filmmaker and her expansive personal collection of LGBTQ film prints and memorabilia were acquired in April 2020 by the Harvard Film Archive.

In 2021 Olson she honored by the Berlin Film Festival with a Special TEDDY Award for her "decades of bridge-building work with which she has made queer film history visible and tangible… Jenni Olson embodies, lives and creates queer film culture."

== Bibliography ==
- Dagger: On Butch Women (1995), (contributor) Cleis Press, ISBN 978-0939416820
- Cookin’ with Honey (1996), (contributor) Cleis Press, ISBN 978-1563410765
- Lesbian Words: State of the Art (1996), (contributor) Richard Kasak Books, ISBN 978-1563333408
- Images in the Dark: An Encyclopedia of Lesbian and Gay Film (1996), (contributor) Plume, ISBN 978-0452276277
- The Ultimate Guide to Lesbian & Gay Film and Video (1996), (editor) Serpent's Tail, ISBN 978-1852423391
- The Queer Movie Poster Book (2004), (author) Chronicle Books, ISBN 978-0811842617
- The Queer Encyclopedia of the Visual Arts (2006), (contributor) Cleis Press, ISBN 978-1573441919
- The Oxford Handbook of Queer Cinema (2021), (contributor: "Lavender Images and Poetic Landscapes: My Thirty Years in the Queer Film Ecosystem") Oxford University Press, ISBN 9780190877996

== Filmography ==
- Levi’s 501s Commercial (1991), experimental video
- Sometimes (1994), experimental video
- Blow-Up (1997), experimental video
- Blue Diary (1998)
- Meep Meep! (2000), experimental video
- By Hook or by Crook (2001), consulting producer
- Sing Along San Francisco (2002), producer
- Matzo Maidels (2003)
- The Joy of Life (2005)
- 575 Castro St. (2009)
- The Royal Road (2015)
- AWOL (2016), consulting producer
- The Freedom to Marry (2016), producer
- In nomine Patris (segment in 30/30 Vision: 3 Decades of Strand Releasing) (2019)
- Disclosure: Trans Lives on Screen (2020), consulting producer
- No Straight Lines: The Rise of Queer Comics (2021), consulting producer

== Awards and nominations ==
Year	Association	Category	Work	Result
1998	Black Maria Film Festival	Director’s Choice Award	Blue Diary (1998)	Won
2005	NewFest	Best U.S. Screenplay	The Joy of Life (2005)	Won
2005	Outfest	Outstanding Achievement	The Joy of Life (2005)	Won
2005	San Francisco Film Critics Circle	Marlon Riggs Award	The Joy of Life (2005)	Won
2015	Ann Arbor Film Festival	Best LGBTQ Film	The Royal Road (2015)	Won
2015	Queer Porto LGBT Film Festival	Best Feature	The Royal Road (2015)	Won
2015	Buenos Aires International Festival of Independent Cinema	Avant Garde & Genre Special Jury Mention	The Royal Road (2015)	Won
2015	Dokufest	Special Jury Mention	The Royal Road (2015)	Won
2015	MIX Copenhagen	Documentary Special Mention	The Royal Road (2015)	Won
2015	Ashland Independent Film Festival	Pride Award	The Royal Road (2015)	Won
2015	San Francisco Museum of Modern Art	SECA Art Award	The Royal Road (2015)	Nominated

== See also ==
- List of female film and television directors
- List of lesbian filmmakers
- List of LGBT-related films directed by women
