= Sam Ball (filmmaker) =

American film director and producer

Sam Ball is a filmmaker, director, and producer. He co-founded Citizen Film, a San Francisco-based not-for-profit production company which "creates films and online media that foster active engagement in cultural and civic life."

Ball received his BA from McGill University in Montreal and his MA in Communication (Documentary Film) from Stanford University in 1996.

His documentaries have been exhibited at the Sundance Film Festival, the Museum of Modern Art, New York, Paris’ Pompidou Centre and on public television.
