= The Sopranos season 6 =

Television show season

The Sopranos
- Season 6
- Blu-ray cover for both parts
- Starring: James Gandolfini; Lorraine Bracco; Edie Falco; Michael Imperioli; Dominic Chianese; Steven Van Zandt; Tony Sirico; Robert Iler; Jamie-Lynn Sigler; Aida Turturro; Steve Schirripa; Vincent Curatola; Frank Vincent; Kathrine Narducci; John Ventimiglia; Dan Grimaldi; Joseph R. Gannascoli; Toni Kalem; Ray Abruzzo; Arthur J. Nascarella; Sharon Angela; Max Casella
- No. of episodes: 21

Release
- Original network: HBO
- Original release: March 12, 2006 – June 10, 2007

Season chronology
- ← Previous; Season 5

The sixth and final season of the HBO drama series The Sopranos began on March 12, 2006, and concluded on June 10, 2007. The season consists of 21 episodes split into two parts; the first 12 episodes began airing on March 12, 2006, and ended on June 4, 2006, and the final 9 episodes began airing on April 8, 2007, with the series finale airing on June 10, 2007. The season was initially meant to consist of twenty episodes, but creator David Chase asked for one more to properly round out the story. The first part was released on DVD in region 1 on November 7, 2006, and on Blu-ray on December 19, 2006. The second part was released on DVD and Blu-ray on October 23, 2007.

The first part of the season focuses on the possibility of redemption as various members of the New Jersey crime family are offered chances to change their behavior, especially mob boss Tony Soprano, who confronts a spiritual awakening following a near-death experience. The second part focuses on the Soprano crime family suffering through the consequences of their actions as they come into conflict with their New York enemies.

Ratings and critical reception were both strong during the sixth season of The Sopranos, but the ending was controversial. The Sopranos won Outstanding Drama Series at the 59th Primetime Emmy Awards for the second part of season six.

== Cast and characters ==
=== Main cast ===
- James Gandolfini as Tony Soprano, the boss of the DiMeo crime family who finds himself undergoing a positive change after a life-threatening incident.
- Lorraine Bracco as Dr. Jennifer Melfi, Tony's therapist, who begins to seriously question her longtime relationship with him.
- Edie Falco as Carmela Soprano, Tony's wife.
- Michael Imperioli as Christopher Moltisanti, a capo and Tony's cousin by marriage, whose relationship with him begins to strain.
- Dominic Chianese as Corrado "Junior" Soprano, Tony's uncle, whose deteriorating mental state causes him to do something drastic.
- Steven Van Zandt as Silvio Dante, the family's loyal consigliere.
- Tony Sirico as Paulie Gualtieri, a short-tempered capo who begins to question his lineage.
- Robert Iler as Anthony "A. J." Soprano Jr., Tony's son who annoys his parents with his lack of work ethic.
- Jamie-Lynn Sigler as Meadow Soprano, Tony's daughter, whom he is trying to prevent from getting anywhere near his occupation.
- Aida Turturro as Janice Soprano, Tony's dramatic sister, whom he blames for an unfortunate incident.
- Steven R. Schirripa as Bobby Baccalieri, a kind-hearted capo on whom Tony takes out his anger towards Bobby's wife Janice, who is Tony's older sister.
- Joseph R. Gannascoli as Vito Spatafore, a capo whose standing is put in jeopardy when a secret is exposed.
- Dan Grimaldi as Patsy Parisi, a DiMeo soldier.
- John Ventimiglia as Artie Bucco, Tony's non-mob friend who runs a restaurant, who finds himself feuding with a DiMeo soldier.
- Vincent Curatola as Johnny "Sack" Sacrimoni, the imprisoned boss of the Lupertazzi family that faces several hardships in jail.
- Frank Vincent as Phil Leotardo, the hot-headed underboss of the Lupertazzi family that bumps up against Tony repeatedly.
- Ray Abruzzo as Little Carmine Lupertazzi, a dim-witted capo in the Lupertazzi family that gets involved with Chris.
- Toni Kalem as Angie Bonpensiero, Pussy's widow who gets involved with her husband's old associates.
- Kathrine Narducci as Charmaine Bucco, Artie's moral wife.
- Sharon Angela as Rosalie Aprile, Carmela's best friend.
- Gregory Antonacci as Butch DeConcini, (Note: These actors are only credited as main cast for one episode each.) a Lupertazzi capo and friend of Phil's.
- Max Casella as Benny Fazio, a DiMeo soldier.
- Carl Capotorto as Little Paulie Germani, a DiMeo soldier and Paulie's nephew.
- Arthur J. Nascarella as Carlo Gervasi, a DiMeo capo.
- Maureen Van Zandt as Gabrielle Dante, Silvio's wife.

=== Recurring cast ===
- Matt Servitto as Dwight Harris, an FBI counter-terrorism agent who consorts with Tony.
- Cara Buono as Kelli Lombardo Moltisanti, Chris's girlfriend.
- Jerry Adler as Hesh Rabkin, Tony's Jewish associate and adviser.
- Dania Ramirez as Blanca Selgado, a single mother that A.J. takes an interest in.
- Drea de Matteo as Adriana La Cerva, Chris's former fiancée.
- Chris Caldovino as Billy Leotardo

== Episodes ==
Season 6 episodes
No. overall	No. in season	Title	Directed by	Written by	Original release date	U.S. viewers (millions)
Part I
66	1	"Members Only"	Tim Van Patten	Terence Winter	March 12, 2006	9.47
Sixteen months later, a DiMeo made man and FBI informant, Eugene Pontecorvo, tries to get permission from either Tony or the FBI to retire to Florida with his family, but he is denied. With his relationship with his family fraying, he commits suicide. Carmela's spec house has a stop order placed on it because of shoddy wood used by Hugh DeAngelis. Hesh Rabkin's son-in-law is brutalized by Lupertazzi men. Unable to get in contact with Phil, the acting boss, Tony is forced to go through an imprisoned Johnny to secure a meeting, where Phil agrees to pay the man. As Junior continues to deteriorate, Melfi recommends he be put in a nursing home, but Tony, feeling guilt over doing the same thing to Livia, refuses. With Janice refusing to take care of Junior, Tony goes to his house, where a confused Junior shoots him in the stomach. Tony manages to dial 911 before passing out.
67	2	"Join the Club"	David Nutter	David Chase	March 19, 2006	9.18
Tony awakens in a California hotel room, where he notices a light flashing in the distance. He realizes he has the belongings of a salesman named "Kevin Finnerty", who looks exactly like him. While looking for his items, Tony has dinner with a group and alludes to having a midlife crisis. As a woman from the group refuses to have sex with him because he is married, a helicopter spotlight hovers over them. Tony, actually in an induced coma after surviving being shot, rips out his breathing tube and has to be put back under. A.J. initially avoids Tony's hospital room but gathers the courage to see him, vowing to kill Junior in revenge. He inadvertently disparages his family while talking to a reporter. Back in California, Tony is attacked by a pair of bhikkhus who believe he is Finnerty, and later falls down a flight of stairs. His MRI shows that he is in the early stages of Alzheimer's. Tony returns to his hotel room and picks up the phone, but puts it back down and stares at the flashing light.
68	3	"Mayham"	Jack Bender	Matthew Weiner	March 26, 2006	8.93
Paulie kills two drug dealers and takes a massive score from them, but Silvio, the acting boss, divides it between the crew in a way that frustrates them. Carmela tells A.J. that he is a burden after discovering what he said to the reporter, and admits to Melfi that while she does not feel guilt over Tony's work anymore, she does for mothering children with a criminal. Chris's interest in the movie industry resurfaces and he forces J.T. Dolan (Note: Chris's screenwriter associate, first seen in "In Camelot".) to write a mob-slasher film in exchange for paying off his debt. (Note: As depicted in "In Camelot".) They pitch it to Little Carmine, and Dolan titles it "Cleaver". As Tony goes into cardiac arrest, he travels to a family reunion he found a flyer for in Finnerty's briefcase. He is stopped at the door by a man identical to Blundetto, who promises him he is "going home" but has to let go of his "business" as a shadowy female figure watches them. Meadow's voice calls to Tony and he wakes up. Chris excitedly tells Tony about Cleaver, only to notice an Ojibwe saying taped to the wall: "Sometimes I go about in pity for myself, and all the while, a great wind carries me across the sky."
69	4	"The Fleshy Part of the Thigh"	Alan Taylor	Diane Frolov & Andrew Schneider	April 2, 2006	8.83
A recovering Tony befriends two other patients, a rapper and a physicist. He admits to the physicist that while in the coma, he realized that everyone is part of "something bigger." As he is being discharged, a paramedic he accused of stealing from him tries to pay him back, but Tony waives his debt. Outside for the first time since the shooting, he declares that "from now on, every day is a gift." Bobby overhears the rapper's friend wishing for similar notoriety and agrees to non-fatally shoot him for cash. Paulie is horrified to learn from his dying nun aunt that she is actually his mother, having had an affair with a soldier that resulted in his birth. He skips her funeral and informs Nucci Gualtieri, actually his aunt, that he will no longer be providing for her, despite Tony reminding him that she loved him as her son. After the man who ran Tony and Johnny's legitimate sanitation business dies, his son plans to sell the company. Tony settles a price for his share with Phil and allows it to be sold, but Paulie attacks the son and demands a monthly payment that will cover Nucci's retirement bills.
70	5	"Mr. & Mrs. John Sacrimoni Request..."	Steve Buscemi	Terence Winter	April 9, 2006	8.58
Johnny is granted temporary release to attend his daughter's wedding, where he asks Tony to kill Lupertazzi capo Rusty Millio, who may cause another power struggle. Johnny is escorted away from the venue before he can see the full ceremony, and he cries in front of the guests, leading Phil to voice his distaste for the supposed loss of masculinity. Junior is transferred to a private psychiatric facility as he awaits trial for the shooting. Vito is spotted by Lupertazzi men in a gay club and he goes into hiding. As Tony refuses to talk to Melfi about the shooting, he notes that his men are giving him "certain looks" since his return from the hospital. She advises him to "act as if you are not feeling vulnerable," and so he picks a fight with his bodyguard in front of his men and wins, only to vomit blood in the bathroom afterwards.
71	6	"Live Free or Die"	Tim Van Patten	David Chase & Terence Winter and Robin Green & Mitchell Burgess	April 16, 2006	7.94
Chris is told by a man in his addiction recovery group about Vito being spotted in the club. Tony admits to Melfi that while he has a religious objection to homosexuality, Vito is important to him and that, like himself, he deserves a second chance. After learning from Finn DeTrolio that Vito was fellating a man, (Note: As depicted in "Unidentified Black Males".) Tony's crew is left disgusted and some members demand his death. Meadow, working as an intern for a law firm that specializes in white collar crime, argues with Finn about the treatment of financial criminals compared to those involved in the mob, storming out when he points out that Vito may be killed for his sexuality. Vito flees the state when men are sent to collect him, but is forced to travel on foot when his car breaks down. He winds up in a small town in New Hampshire, where he decides to stay after becoming enamored with its friendly atmosphere.
72	7	"Luxury Lounge"	Danny Leiner	Matthew Weiner	April 23, 2006	8.49
Artie confronts Tony after learning that he ate at a rival restaurant, but ignores his suggestions to improve Nuovo Vesuvio's declining quality. American Express stops doing business with him after Benny Fazio (Note: A DiMeo soldier, first seen in "Fortunate Son".) and a hostess he has been having an affair with run a credit card scam on Artie's customers, so he fires her and beats up Benny. Tony forces them to make peace and has Benny have dinner at Nuovo Vesuvio, but Artie references Benny's affair in front of his wife and Benny forces his hand into a vat of boiling sauce. Tony suggests therapy to Artie but is angrily rejected. Chris organizes a successful hit on Millio before going to Los Angeles to cast actors for Cleaver. He meets with Ben Kingsley, who gets distracted by the hotel's luxury lounge, which offers him free items. When Chris tries to intimidate Kingsley into getting access to the lounge, he mentions that awards show presenters are given lounge goods worth thousands of dollars. Chris mugs Lauren Bacall and gives her items to Tony, who is annoyed with him for not being in New Jersey to stop Benny.
73	8	"Johnny Cakes"	Tim Van Patten	Diane Frolov & Andrew Schneider	April 30, 2006	8.54
Despite his parents offering him work, A.J. spends his time sitting around the house or in nightclubs. He takes a knife to Junior's facility, but drops it when Junior, mistaking him for Tony, begs him to take him home. He is arrested, Tony is forced to bail him out, and A.J. insists that he was trying to avenge Tony like in The Godfather. A friend asks A.J. to get Tony to help with a financial dispute, and he has a panic attack. Vito finds himself taken with local chef Jim Witowski and they kiss, but he instinctively punches Jim, leading to a fight that leaves Vito beaten. Several days later, he apologizes to Jim and they have sex. Tony, sexually active for the first time since the shooting, is accosted by a realtor who offers to buy a local store to turn it into a Jamba Juice. He rejects the deals until the price reaches half a million, and they kiss after agreeing on the sale. Tony stops himself from having sex with her and redirects his frustration at Carmela when he returns home.
74	9	"The Ride"	Alan Taylor	Terence Winter	May 7, 2006	8.49
Chris marries his girlfriend after learning that she is pregnant. While driving back from a business trip, he and Tony steal expensive wine from bikers who are robbing a liquor store. Chris breaks his sobriety when he and Tony toast his marriage with the wine, and they reminisce about their bond, as well as the day Chris gave up Adriana. (Note: As depicted in "Long Term Parking".) Paulie refuses to donate the requested amount for the Feast of Elzéar of Sabran to the church. Chris spends the first night of the festival on heroin. The next day, a ride breaks down, and Paulie is blamed due to his cheapness. Janice, on the ride, fakes a neck injury so Bobby can extort money from Paulie, and Tony orders them to settle the dispute. As Paulie learns that he may have prostate cancer, he curses at Nucci when she chastises him for his handling of the Feast. Early at the Bada Bing, he sees a vision of the Virgin Mary. Terrified, he reconciles with Nucci.
75	10	"Moe n' Joe"	Steve Shill	Matthew Weiner	May 14, 2006	8.13
Vito finds himself bored with everyday work. He steals Jim's car and leaves, only to crash into another car. When the owner refuses to take cash and goes to call the police, Vito kills him. After Bobby's eye is badly injured while making collections, Tony admits to Melfi that he treats him and Janice unfairly because of resentments he carries from their childhood, and Melfi points out that Janice may remind him of Livia. Knowing that a plea deal with the FBI would result in losing most of his assets, Johnny asks Tony to get the owners of a company Johnny is a partner in to sell. Tony agrees so long as he sells his house to Janice at a discounted price. Johnny pleads guilty and admits in court that he is part of the mafia, earning universal contempt from his peers. Janice begins to cry while thanking Tony for getting her the house, and Carmela, assuming she is upset, comforts her while Tony rolls his eyes.
76	11	"Cold Stones"	Tim Van Patten	Diane Frolov & Andrew Schneider and David Chase	May 21, 2006	8.18
Carmela discovers that A.J. has been fired from his job. Tony admits to Melfi that he wants to hit A.J., and she points out that Carmela protects A.J. as he wishes Livia protected him. He tries to speak civilly to A.J. about getting him a job, but smashes the windshield of his car when he complains. Vito meets with Tony and asks to return to the family, but Tony's men disapprove, and Phil, particularly hateful because he is related to Vito by marriage, demands his death. Vito returns to his family and calls Jim, who rejects him. Phil and his men ambush Vito, killing and sodomizing him with pool cues. One of the made men who killed Vito, Dom Gamiello, comes to Satriale's while Silvio and capo Carlo Gervasi are there and begins joking about Carlo also being gay, and they kill him. Carmela goes to Paris with Rosalie and is enamored with the architecture. She dreams about Adriana walking her deceased (Note: Killed in "The Strong, Silent Type".) dog near the Eiffel Tower, and a policeman comments that "someone needs to tell her she's dead."
77	12	"Kaisha"	Alan Taylor	Terence Winter and David Chase & Matthew Weiner	June 4, 2006	8.91
Tony has Benny blow up Phil's wire room. Little Carmine hosts a sitdown to try and negotiate peace, but Phil storms out when he brings up Billy Leotardo. Suspecting Tony's role in Gamiello's disappearance, Phil begins plotting a revenge hit, only to have a heart attack. Tony visits Phil in the hospital, telling him about what he learned in his coma and encouraging him to instead focus on family, which moves him. Tony tries to seduce the realtor, unaware that she is seeing Chris. Having met in his recovery group, Chris begins using heroin with her. Tony spots the two talking, and Chris is forced to admit the truth so he does not find out about the drugs. Tony acts indifferent, but expresses jealousy to Melfi, who commends his restraint. While at work, A.J. meets and starts dating single mother Blanca Selgado. A group of youths that regularly bother her hang out outside her house, and A.J. bribes them to leave her alone. After Adriana's mother tries to kill herself, Carmela posits hiring a private investigator to find her. Tony has Silvio get the stop order lifted, and she drops the idea. The Sopranos's relatives come to their house for Christmas, and A.J. brings Blanca and her son. As the families sit together, Carmela takes Tony's hand.
Part II
78	13	"Soprano Home Movies"	Tim Van Patten	Diane Frolov & Andrew Schneider and David Chase & Matthew Weiner	April 8, 2007	7.66
Eight months later, Phil returns from recovery and declares intent to enjoy life with his family. The gun Tony dropped (Note: As depicted in "All Due Respect".) is found on a drug user. He and Carmela travel to Bobby and Janice's upstate New York cabin to celebrate his birthday, where Bobby gifts him a customized assault rifle. He mentions the possibility of promoting Bobby, who has never killed before because his father wanted to keep him out of the mob. The four spend the night playing drunken Monopoly, but when Janice tells a humiliating story about Livia, Tony begins insulting her. Bobby fights him and wins, and the next day, Tony orders him to travel to Montreal to complete a hit job over a custody dispute. As Bobby completes the hit, Tony returns home and is told that the FBI added the gun to their RICO case against him. As he watches Janice's gift, a compilation of old videos of him playing with his sisters, Bobby returns to the cabin and holds his young daughter as he looks out at the lake.
79	14	"Stage 5"	Alan Taylor	Terence Winter	April 15, 2007	7.42
Cleaver premieres, and everyone but Tony seems to notice the parallels between the film and his, Chris, and Adriana's relationship. After Carmela points this out to him and confronts Chris, Chris forces Dolan to pretend as though he stole the plot from another film. Unconvinced, Tony tearfully admits his suspicion to Melfi that Chris hates him and Cleaver was his way of showing this. With Johnny dying of lung cancer in prison, Lupertazzi capo Faustino Santoro has Phil's successor killed at a dinner with Silvio. Little Carmine declines to get involved when Tony presses him, not wanting to risk his own life. Johnny takes up smoking again and learns from an orderly that he may have longer to live than anticipated, only to die soon after. Phil celebrates Billy's birthday, but tells a capo that he was weak when he did not act after Billy's death (Note: As depicted in "The Test Dream".) and promises that he will not make that mistake again. At the baptism of Chris's daughter, he and Tony embrace, their expressions blank.
80	15	"Remember When"	Phil Abraham	Terence Winter	April 22, 2007	6.85
The FBI discover the body of Tony's first murder, forcing him and Paulie to go to Miami and lay low. He takes a bridge loan out from Hesh to cover a series of lost bets, and learns that Jackie Aprile is being blamed for the murder. To celebrate, he takes Paulie out on a fishing boat, where he asks him if he told Johnny about Ralphie's joke. (Note: As depicted in "No Show".) Increasingly annoyed with Paulie over the course of the trip, he considers killing him. Paulie has a nightmare upon returning home about Pussy, where he asks if he will "stand up" when "my time comes." He sends the Sopranos an expensive espresso machine the next day. After Santoro takes food off Phil's plate at a dinner, Phil has him killed, making him the official boss of the Lupertazzi family. Junior gambles with the other patients in his facility, but is shut down by another patient. Junior attacks him, getting him put on a new set of medications. An ill-tempered young patient who he has befriended encourages him not to take them. He is threatened with transfer if he does not comply, disappointing Junior's friend, who he calls "Anthony" while trying to make up with him. He breaks Junior's arm and Junior later receives animal-assisted therapy, sitting apart from the other patients with his gaze vacant.
81	16	"Chasing It"	Tim Van Patten	Matthew Weiner	April 29, 2007	6.76
As Tony continues to lose his bets, he offers to pay Hesh a vig despite him not charging interest for the loan. When Hesh visits Tony and his crew, Tony makes several Jewish jokes at his expense. Carmela sells the spec house despite feeling guilt over the wood's quality, and Tony demands a cut of the profit so he can bet it, but she refuses. His bet pays off, leaving him enraged at the money he could have made, and they violently argue. They later make up and Carmela admits her fear about the threats in their lives, but Tony insists he is "way up" after surviving being shot. Vito's son begins acting out and his mother requests money from Tony so they can relocate. When the boy is expelled from school for defecating in front of his bullies, Tony decides to pay, but gambles away the money and instead pays for him to be sent to a boot camp that allows the students to be beaten. A.J. proposes to Blanca and she initially accepts, but later breaks up with him. Hesh's girlfriend dies, and Tony finally pays back his loan, offering minimal condolences.
82	17	"Walk Like a Man"	Terence Winter	Terence Winter	May 6, 2007	7.16
A.J. falls into a depression and his parents send him to a therapist. Tony has him spend time with Carlo's son, and A.J. helps him abduct and torture a debtor. Tony tells Melfi that he intended to quit therapy, but feels he has to stay now that A.J. is suffering due to his "rotten genes." Chris notices that Tony is talking to him less, and he points out that Chris never comes to the Bada Bing or Satriale's anymore, despite his insistence that the alcohol there make him anxious. Paulie's cousin steals from Chris's father-in-law's store and Paulie refuses him a cut of the profits, so Chris throws his cousin out a window. Paulie tears up Chris's lawn with his car, and Tony helps them make peace, during which Chris decides to drink with the crew. Paulie makes several crude jokes about Chris's daughter, and Chris leaves when he notices Tony laughing. With his sponsor out of town, Chris goes to Dolan's house and tries to give him mob stories to write about. Instead Dolan harshly says, “You're in the mafia!" Chris takes out his gun and kills Dolan, then returns home, where he rights a tree in his yard that Paulie knocked over.
83	18	"Kennedy and Heidi"	Alan Taylor	Matthew Weiner and David Chase	May 13, 2007	6.49
Phil learns that the waste Tony has been sending to the sanitation business contains asbestos, and he demands an increased cut of profits if he is to take more. Chris drives erratically with Tony while not wearing a seatbelt and crashes, severely injuring himself. Chris tells Tony to call a taxi instead as he will not pass a drug test. Realizing he is using heroin again, Tony suffocates him. He dreams of admitting relief to Melfi at the weight Chris's death took off him, as well as his role in the deaths of Blundetto and Pussy. In the actual session, he claims he is not grieving. He is annoyed by the display of sorrow at Chris's wake, later attending the much less populated wake of Nucci with Carmela. A.J. seems to improve, but falls back into depression after his friends beat up a young black man. He forlornly asks his therapist "why can't we all just get along?" Tony impulsively leaves for Las Vegas after seeing Chris's widow breastfeed their daughter, where he has sex and takes peyote with Chris's former stripper comare. He has a winning streak in roulette, mumbles "he's dead," and collapses in a fit of laughter. As the waste is dumped into a lake, Tony watches the sun rise over the Red Rock Canyon with the stripper. He sees a flash of light in the sky and cries "I get it!"
84	19	"The Second Coming"	Tim Van Patten	Terence Winter	May 20, 2007	7.34
After reading the poem "The Second Coming", A.J. ties a cinder block to his ankle and jumps into his pool. The rope is too long to keep the block from drowning him but too short for him to escape. Tony finds and saves him, initially furious but trying to comfort A.J. after seeing how distressed he is. A guilty Carmela and Tony blame each other. In a therapy session with his parents, A.J. recounts upsetting memories of them going back to his childhood and mentions Livia's depressing words (Note: As depicted in "D-Girl".) having an effect on him. Tony rejects Melfi's idea that A.J.'s attempt could have been a cry for help, and mentions that, in Las Vegas, he realized that there is "something else" beyond the human experience, but does not want to look into it further. Elliot Kupferberg tells Melfi that a recent study shows sociopaths use therapy as a way to sharpen their skills. Phil rejects Tony's compromise about the asbestos. A Lupertazzi capo harasses Meadow, who has recently committed to law school and started to date Patsy's son. When Tony finds out, he curb stomps the man. Little Carmine again tries to broker peace, but Phil refuses to see Tony.
85	20	"The Blue Comet"	Alan Taylor	David Chase and Matthew Weiner	June 3, 2007	8.02
Silvio kills Carlo's cousin for trying to defect to the Lupertazzis. Phil orders Tony, Silvio and Bobby killed. The FBI warns Tony, and he orders a hit on Phil. In inpatient, A.J. notices his friend's ex-girlfriend and the two begin seeing each other after they are discharged. Janice tells Tony that Junior's savings can no longer pay for his facility and asks him to help, but he refuses. Melfi, at a dinner with her colleagues, hears about the study again, and she later reads it and realizes it applies to Tony. As he complains about his children in his next session, she becomes increasingly short and tells him she intends to stop treating him. He argues with her but she remains unmoved and closes the door after he leaves. The hitmen go to the house of Phil's comare and, mistaking her father for Phil, kill them both. Tony learns of the failed hit and orders everyone to go into hiding, but Bobby is killed and Silvio is shot, leaving him in a coma. Tony orders Carmela to go into hiding and tries to get A.J. to do the same, but when he begins to cry over Bobby, Tony drags him out of bed and throws him to the floor. Tony goes to a safe house and lies in bed, clutching the rifle Bobby gave him.
86	21	"Made in America"	David Chase	David Chase	June 10, 2007	11.90
Tony gives the FBI information on a pair of suspicious Muslim men who hang around the Bada Bing in exchange for Phil's general location on Long Island. Phil rejects peace and warns his underboss, Butchie DeConcini, that there will be consequences for failing to kill Tony. Butchie agrees to a truce with Tony in exchange for sanctioning Phil's death and paying Janice for Bobby's hit. Tony's men find Phil and kill him. A.J. announces his intent to join the army, but his parents convince him to work for Little Carmine's production company instead. Meadow gets engaged to her boyfriend and is fully dedicated to becoming a white-collar crime lawyer, leaving Tony disappointed that she is not going to be a pediatrician. Carlo disappears after his son is arrested; Tony's lawyer suspects that he may have become an informant. Tony offers Carlo's position as capo of the Aprile Crew to Paulie, who reluctantly accepts. Janice visits Junior, now in a state facility, and tries to tell him of Bobby's death. When Tony learns that Janice is trying to find Junior's remaining money, he speaks to him for the first time since the shooting and tries to convince him to give it to Bobby's children, but Junior does not recognize him. Tony reminds Junior of how "you and my father ran North Jersey," and departs emotionally when Junior murmurs, "Well, that's nice." Tony meets his family in Holsten's diner. While looking for music to play on a tabletop jukebox, he glances over several songs before deciding upon Journey's "Don't Stop Believin'". He tells Carmela that Carlo will be testifying against him, and A.J. reminds him to "remember the good times." (Note: A reference to "I Dream of Jeannie Cusamano", where Tony told him the same thing.) A man who has been staring at them goes to the restroom near their table, and as Meadow enters the diner, Tony looks up and the shot cuts to black.

== Reception ==
=== Critical reviews ===
On the review aggregator website Metacritic, the sixth season scored 96 out of 100, based on 18 reviews, indicating "Universal acclaim". On Rotten Tomatoes, the first half of the season has an 89% approval rating with an average score of 9.8/10 based on 37 reviews with the following critical consensus: "The Sopranos' final season craftily builds to its anticipated climax with more of the dark humor and heartfelt characterizations that made it one of television's strongest series." The second half of the season has an 84% approval rating with an average score of 8.5/10 based on 31 reviews with the following critical consensus: "America's first crime family bows out in a chilling cut to black during a meditative final season that is debatably cruel to audience expectations but wholly committed to its thematic integrity."

In Time Out New York, Andrew Johnston placed The Sopranos at the top of his list of the best TV of 2007, stating: "Even before the final episode aired, the last half-season of David Chase's Garden State gangland saga embodied everything that was great about The Sopranos. Then came the Chase-directed 'Made in America,' which miraculously restored Journey's street cred and created the kind of zeitgeist moment that wasn't supposed to be possible anymore in a fragmented, 600-channel cable universe. Lots of TV dramas are compared to novels these days, but few others (maybe only The Wire) have achieved the scope and substance of literary fiction while painting between the lines of small-screen convention."

=== Awards and nominations ===
==== Part I (2006) ====
Year	Association	Category	Nominee(s)	Result	Ref.
2006	Primetime Emmy Awards	Outstanding Drama Series		Nominated	
2006	Primetime Emmy Awards	Outstanding Supporting Actor in a Drama Series	Michael Imperioli (episodes: "Luxury Lounge" + "The Ride")	Nominated	
2006	Primetime Emmy Awards	Outstanding Directing for a Drama Series	David Nutter (episode: "Join the Club")	Nominated	
2006	Primetime Emmy Awards	Outstanding Directing for a Drama Series	Tim Van Patten (episode: "Members Only")	Nominated	
2006	Primetime Emmy Awards	Outstanding Writing for a Drama Series	Terrence Winter (episode: "Members Only")	Won	
2006	Golden Globe Awards	Best Actress in a Drama Series	Edie Falco	Nominated	
2006	Screen Actors Guild Awards	Outstanding Ensemble in a Drama Series	Entire Cast	Nominated	
2006	Screen Actors Guild Awards	Outstanding Actor in a Drama Series	James Gandolfini	Nominated	
2006	Screen Actors Guild Awards	Outstanding Actress in a Drama Series	Edie Falco	Nominated	
2006	Directors Guild of America Awards	Outstanding Directing for a Drama Series	David Nutter (episode: "Join the Club")	Nominated	
2006	Directors Guild of America Awards	Outstanding Directing for a Drama Series	Tim Van Patten (episode: "Members Only")	Nominated	
2006	Writers Guild of America Awards	Best Dramatic Series		Won	
2006	TCA Awards	Program of the Year		Nominated	
2006	TCA Awards	Outstanding Achievement in Drama		Nominated	
2006	TCA Awards	Outstanding Individual Achievement in Drama	James Gandolfini	Nominated	

==== Part II (2007) ====
Year	Association	Category	Nominee(s)	Result	Ref.
2007	Primetime Emmy Awards	Outstanding Drama Series		Won	
2007	Primetime Emmy Awards	Outstanding Lead Actor in a Drama Series	James Gandolfini (episode: "The Second Coming")	Nominated	
2007	Primetime Emmy Awards	Outstanding Lead Actress in a Drama Series	Edie Falco (episode: "The Second Coming")	Nominated	
2007	Primetime Emmy Awards	Outstanding Supporting Actor in a Drama Series	Michael Imperioli (episode: "Walk Like a Man")	Nominated	
2007	Primetime Emmy Awards	Outstanding Supporting Actress in a Drama Series	Lorraine Bracco (episode: "The Blue Comet")	Nominated	
2007	Primetime Emmy Awards	Outstanding Supporting Actress in a Drama Series	Aida Turturro (episode: "Soprano Home Movies")	Nominated	
2007	Primetime Emmy Awards	Outstanding Guest Actor in a Drama Series	Tim Daly (episode: "Walk Like a Man")	Nominated	
2007	Primetime Emmy Awards	Outstanding Directing for a Drama Series	Alan Taylor (episode: "Kennedy and Heidi")	Won	
2007	Primetime Emmy Awards	Outstanding Writing for a Drama Series	David Chase (episode: "Made in America")	Won	
2007	Primetime Emmy Awards	Outstanding Writing for a Drama Series	David Chase, Matthew Weiner (episode: "Kennedy and Heidi")	Nominated	
2007	Primetime Emmy Awards	Outstanding Writing for a Drama Series	Terrence Winter (episode: "The Second Coming")	Nominated	
2007	Golden Globe Award	Best Actress in a Drama Series	Edie Falco	Nominated	
2007	Screen Actors Guild Awards	Outstanding Ensemble in a Drama Series	Entire Cast	Won	
2007	Screen Actors Guild Awards	Outstanding Actor in a Drama Series	James Gandolfini	Won	
2007	Screen Actors Guild Awards	Outstanding Actress in a Drama Series	Edie Falco	Won	
2007	Directors Guild of America Awards	Outstanding Directing for a Drama Series	David Chase (episode: "Made in America")	Nominated	
2007	Directors Guild of America Awards	Outstanding Directing for a Drama Series	Tim Van Patten (episode: "Soprano Home Movies")	Nominated	
2007	Writers Guild of America Awards	Best Dramatic Series		Nominated	
2007	Writers Guild of America Awards	Best Dramatic Episode	Terrence Winter (episode: "The Second Coming")	Won	
2007	TCA Awards	Outstanding Achievement in Drama		Won	
