= Made in America (The Sopranos) =

- The Sopranos episode
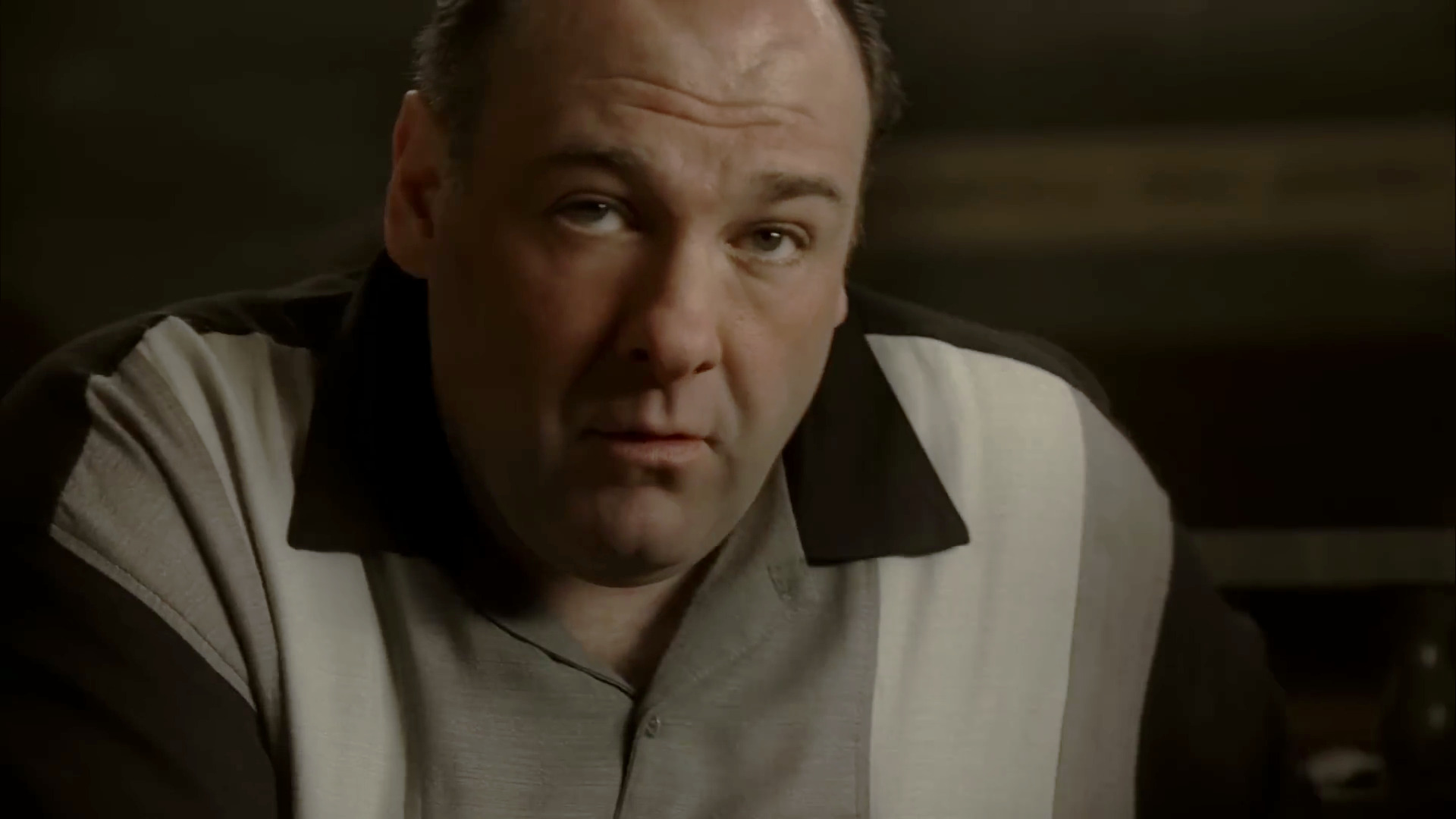
- The final shot of the series features Tony Soprano
- Episode no.: Season 6 Episode 21
- Directed by: David Chase
- Written by: David Chase
- Cinematography by: Alik Sakharov
- Editing by: Sidney Wolinsky
- Production code: S621
- Original air date: June 10, 2007
- Running time: 60 minutes

Episode chronology
← Previous "The Blue Comet"	Next → —
- The Sopranos season 6

"Made in America" is the series finale of the American crime drama television series The Sopranos. It is the 86th episode of the series overall, the ninth episode of the second part of the sixth season, and the 21st episode of the season overall. Written and directed by series creator David Chase, "Made in America" first aired on HBO in the United States on June 10, 2007.

The plot involves Tony Soprano attempting to end the war with rival Mafioso Phil Leotardo, and musing on its drastic consequences to those around him. Tony also seeks to secure his family's futures, and tie up loose ends with his associates and enemies.

The ending of "Made in America" was controversial upon airing, but received critical acclaim and has drawn various critical analyses, interpretations, and fan theories; Chase has made varied comments about the finale but has not explicitly given an explanation, opinion, or statement regarding the series' ending. The episode is now considered one of the greatest series finales of all time.

== Synopsis ==
Tony remains in hiding with his crew. Accompanied by Paulie, Tony meets FBI Agent Harris and gives him information about Ahmed and Muhammad in exchange for Phil's location, but Harris does not know anything. Tony visits his family in their safe house and later joins them at Bobby's funeral. Tony then visits Janice at her house, and she tells him she will raise Bobby's children, oblivious to how much they hate her. Later, Harris informs Tony that Phil has been using payphones from gas stations in Oyster Bay, Long Island, and Tony's crew begins surveilling the area.

Phil calls Butchie from a payphone, expresses anger about his failure to kill Tony, and rejects Butchie's suggestion to make peace. He also vaguely tells Butchie that they will sit down and talk about his ineffectiveness after Tony is dead. Tony meets with Butchie to negotiate without Phil's knowledge. Not knowing where Phil is hiding, Butchie cannot disclose his boss's location, but agrees to a truce and allows Tony to order a hit on Phil, and they also agree to make restitution to Janice and Bobby's family. Shortly after, Tony and his family move back into their North Caldwell home.

A.J. is unhappy with their current living situation, but continues to see Rhiannon Flammer despite his insistence to everyone that they are just friends and that she is only 17 years old. The couple are sitting in his car in the forest listening to music. The two attempt to have sex before A.J. notices that his car's engine has caught fire, prompting them to flee before it is entirely engulfed in flames. Tony and Carmela are furious with A.J. once he informs them that his car has been destroyed. A.J. later tells them he intends to join the Army, but they arrange for him to work for Little Carmine's film production company instead. Meadow and Patrick Parisi announce their engagement and that Meadow may land a high-paying job at a law firm that defends white collar criminals, to Tony's disappointment. Tony visits the comatose Silvio in the hospital.

Carlo goes missing, and Paulie fears he may have become an informant after his son Jason Gervasi was arrested on a drug-related charge. Tony's lawyer, Neil Mink, tells Tony that Carlo is likely an informant, and that Tony will be indicted. With Carlo gone, Tony offers the leadership of the Aprile crew to Paulie, who initially rejects the offer; when Tony states Paulie's underling Patsy will take it otherwise, Paulie reluctantly accepts.

Phil Leotardo is dropped off at one of the remaining gas stations with a payphone. As he talks to his wife, he is executed by Walden Belfiore who has been watching the location with Benny Fazio. His wife gets out, screaming, leaving the SUV in drive; it proceeds to roll over and crush Phil's head.

Janice visits Junior (who is now toothless and in an advanced state of dementia) to inform him of Bobby's death, but Junior's declining health has left him unable to understand. Uncle Pat tells Tony he believes Janice is scheming to claim Junior's remaining money for herself. Tony visits Junior and tells him to give the money to Bobby's children, but realizes Junior no longer knows who he is. When Tony tries to remind Junior of his mafia life and how he and his brother ran North Jersey, Junior replies, "Well, that's nice." A teary-eyed Tony leaves.

The Sopranos arrange to meet at Holsten's diner. Tony tells Carmela that Carlo has flipped and will testify, while A.J. reminds his father of his advice to remember the good times. Tony remains alert, and has been looking up at every patron entering the diner. A man in a Members Only jacket who has been watching them gets up to use the bathroom. Meadow arrives late after having trouble parking her car. As the diner door opens, the bell rings and Tony looks up. The screen cuts to black.

== Cast ==
- James Gandolfini as Tony Soprano
- Lorraine Bracco as Dr. Jennifer Melfi *
- Edie Falco as Carmela Soprano
- Michael Imperioli as Christopher Moltisanti **
- Dominic Chianese as Corrado "Junior" Soprano
- Steven Van Zandt as Silvio Dante
- Tony Sirico as Paulie Gualtieri
- Robert Iler as Anthony Soprano, Jr.
- Jamie-Lynn Sigler as Meadow Soprano
- Aida Turturro as Janice Soprano Baccalieri
- Frank Vincent as Phil Leotardo
- Ray Abruzzo as Little Carmine Lupertazzi
- Dan Grimaldi as Patsy Parisi
- Sharon Angela as Rosalie Aprile
- Maureen Van Zandt as Gabriella Dante

* = credit only ** = photo only

=== Guest stars ===
- Gregory Antonacci as Butch DeConcini
- Max Casella as Benny Fazio
- Carl Capotorto as "Little Paulie" Germani
- Arthur J. Nascarella as Carlo Gervasi
- Matt Servitto as Agent Harris
- Frank Albanese as Patrizio "Uncle Pat" Blundetto
- John Cenatiempo as Anthony Maffei
- John "Cha Cha" Ciarcia as Albie Cianflone
- Michele DeCesare as Hunter Scangarelo
- Michael Drayer as Jason Parisi
- Frank John Hughes as Walden Belfiore
- Michael Kelly as Agent Goddard
- Geraldine LiBrandi as Patty Leotardo
- David Margulies as Neil Mink
- Angelo Massagli as Bobby Baccalieri, Jr.
- Peter Mele as George Paglieri
- Donna Pescow as Donna Parisi
- Joseph Perrino as Jason Gervasi
- Anthony Ribustello as Dante Greco
- Daniel Sauli as Patrick Parisi
- Jenna Stern as Dr. Doherty
- Emily Wickersham as Rhiannon Flammer
- Danielle Di Vecchio as Barbara Soprano Giglione
- Ed Vassallo as Tom Giglione
- Rick Aiello as Raymond "Ray-Ray" D'Abaldo
- Melanie Minichino as Tara Zincone
- Amy Russ as Female FBI Agent
- Paolo Colandrea as Man in Members Only Jacket
- Patti Karr as Old Woman in Diner
- Avery Elaine and Emily Ruth Pulcher as Domenica Baccalieri (photo only)

== Deceased ==
- Phil Leotardo: Shot to death by Walden Belfiore. His head was then run over and crushed by his wife's truck, which was still in drive when she rushed to his aid.

== Production ==
=== Conception ===
Showrunner David Chase planned The Sopranos ending during the 21-month hiatus between seasons 5 and 6; the final scene was filmed as Chase had envisioned, while then-HBO chairman Chris Albrecht suggested concluding the series with the sixth season. The finale was not intended as a setup for a sequel. However, Chase later commented, "There may be a day where we all come up with something". Although a sequel was ultimately not developed, a prequel film titled The Many Saints of Newark was released in 2021.

=== Writing ===
As with every episode of the season, the plot outline of "Made in America" was developed by Chase and his writing staff; for the final season, this consisted of executive producers Terence Winter and Matthew Weiner, and supervising producers and writing team Diane Frolov and Andrew Schneider. Frequent episode director Tim Van Patten also provided Chase with storyline suggestions. After the episode's story was outlined, Chase wrote the first draft. After input from the staff, Chase revised the script, but continued to make minor changes during filming. "Made in America" is his 30th and final official writing credit (including story credits) for the series and his ninth as sole writer of an episode.

Chase again included allusions to real-life American Mafia history and events in the script for "Made in America". Specifically, the line "Damn! We're gonna win this thing!", spoken by Dwight Harris after being informed of Phil Leotardo's death, is quoted from former FBI supervisor Lindley DeVecchio. DeVecchio said the line after being told Lorenzo "Larry" Lampasi had been killed in front of his Brooklyn home. DeVecchio was later charged for informing the Mafia on various accounts, which Dwight later does for Tony Soprano.

=== Filming ===
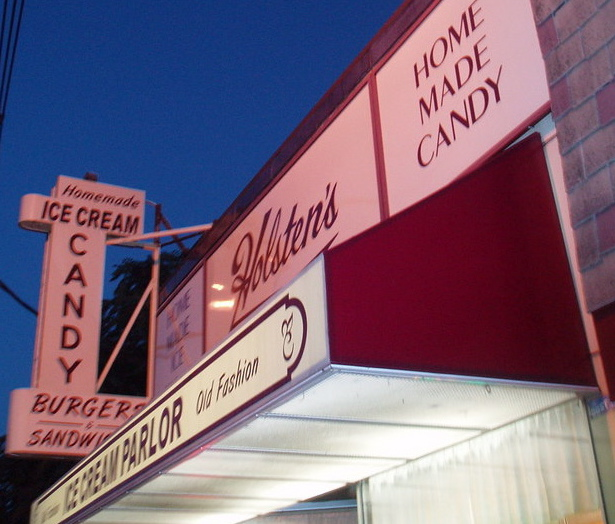
The episode's final scene was shot in Holsten's Brookdale Confectionery (pictured August 2007) in Bloomfield, New Jersey, in March 2007.

"Made in America" was directed by Chase and photographed by Alik Sakharov. The two served in the same capacities for the pilot episode, "The Sopranos", which was filmed in 1997. The series finale marks the second time Chase has officially directed an episode of The Sopranos, although as showrunner, he would oversee the direction of most episodes throughout the show's production. "Made in America" marks the 38th and final credit for Sakharov as director of photography.

Principal photography commenced in late February and concluded in late March 2007. Exterior scenes and certain interior scenes of "Made in America" were filmed on location in Bergen County, New Jersey, and in Brooklyn and Manhattan, New York City, New York. Additional interior scenes—including indoor shots of the Soprano residence and the back room of the Bada Bing! strip club—were filmed in a sound stage in Silvercup Studios in Long Island City, Queens, New York.

The final scene was filmed in March 2007 at Holsten's Brookdale Confectionery, an ice cream and candy shop located in Bloomfield, New Jersey. The Bloomfield Township Council tried to stop HBO from filming in the town because they found the series offensive to Italian-Americans and voted to deny the production company a filming permit. As the council had no authority to stop filming in the town as long as the crew met the requirements stated in Bloomfield's code for filming crews, a permit was issued.

To prevent leaks of the episode's ending or plot details, the scripts given to crew members had their final pages removed or given ones with alternate endings. In one example, the ending scene featured Tony raking leaves outside his house, which is a scene that occurs 10 minutes before the ending in the final cut; Chase received compliments for this ending from those with the edited script. The scene where Phil Leotardo was killed was filmed in Morris Plains, New Jersey.

=== Post-production ===
"Made in America" was edited by Sidney Wolinsky, one of the show's three editors, under the supervision of Chase. Chase originally wanted the black screen at the end of the episode to last "all the way to the HBO whoosh sound", meaning that no credits would roll at the end of the episode, but did not receive a waiver from the Directors Guild of America to do so.

=== Music ===
In the scene in which Anthony Jr.'s vehicle catches fire while parked on leaves, Anthony and Rhiannon are listening to "It's Alright, Ma (I'm Only Bleeding)" from the album Bringing It All Back Home by Bob Dylan. In the final scene, "All That You Dream" by Little Feat plays on the restaurant's speakers as Tony enters the diner ahead of his family. The song "Don't Stop Believin'" by Journey then plays throughout the rest of the scene. Steve Perry initially refused to clear the song for use, fearing it would be remembered for being part of a death sequence; Chase promised otherwise, and Perry ultimately gave final approval three days before the episode aired. Immediately following the episode, the song saw a huge surge in popularity, with its sales on iTunes growing by 482%; its use in the series is credited with reviving mainstream attention for Journey, who reportedly suffered financial difficulties in the 2000s.

== Analysis and interpretation ==
The final scene of "Made in America" became the subject of intense discussion, controversy, and analysis after its original broadcast. The use of an abrupt cut to black followed by several seconds of silence led many viewers to initially believe that their cable or DVR had cut out at a crucial moment. Opposing interpretations soon emerged among viewers regarding the ultimate fate of series protagonist Tony Soprano, with some believing that he was killed while others believe that he remains alive (the final shot has led many to speculate that if still alive, Tony will spend the rest of his life in true gangster fashion, "looking over his shoulder").

One argument for the former points to a conversation that Tony had in the midseason premiere episode "Soprano Home Movies" with his brother-in-law Bobby, in which Bobby comments on how suddenly death can happen in their line of work: "You probably don't even hear it when it happens, right?" A flashback to this scene also appears in the final minutes of "The Blue Comet", the episode preceding "Made in America". When questioned on the theory, HBO spokesman Quentin Schaffer stated that the conversation is a "legitimate" hint. The final scene showing a man who glances at Tony twice (credited as "Man in Members Only Jacket") and who later goes to the bathroom, has been interpreted as a reference to Michael Corleone retrieving a hidden gun from a restaurant bathroom to kill his enemies in The Godfather (1972); in the episode "Johnny Cakes", it was revealed that this is Tony's favorite scene from the film.

Speculation has also linked the jacket of the man to the title of the opening episode of the season, "Members Only", in which Tony is shot, and also as a symbolic reference to the mysterious man's membership in the Mafia. Matt Servitto, who portrayed Dwight Harris, said the scene originally continued with the Man in Members Only Jacket emerging from the bathroom and walking towards Tony's table. However, Servitto later clarified this statement, saying he did not mean to imply that there was a different or directly intended ending, but only that the "genius" editing was not what he had expected.

Other viewers offer opposing interpretations. It has been suggested that the final scene portrays that, while Tony's life is fraught with fear and danger, which could come from anywhere, and while Tony has to constantly watch his back and look out for any emerging trouble (he keeps an eye on the diner entrance), life nevertheless goes on and the viewer simply does not get to continue seeing it. The lyrics of the closing song, seemingly telling the viewer "Don't stop believin'," are thought to support this, while the silent black screen space before the credits is meant to allow people to imagine and believe in their own continuations of Tony's story. It can be stated that because of Tony's peace agreement with the Lupertazzi family, their tacit sanction of a hit on Phil, and Butchie's visible unwillingness to continue the hostilities, there was little legitimate basis to expect a hit on Tony from the Lupertazzis and the threat to him, although always present, was not higher than usual.

=== David Chase comments ===
Chase has made various comments about the finale but has avoided providing an explanation to the meaning of the final scene, noting its ambiguity as deliberate. In response to some reports that Chase has offered a definitive answer to the ultimate fate of Tony Soprano, Chase has issued denials indicating those reports were incorrect; publications have printed retractions, while Chase publicly reiterated the ending is ambiguous.

In his first interview after the broadcast of the finale with The Star-Ledger, Chase stated,

I have no interest in explaining, defending, reinterpreting, or adding to what is there. No one was trying to be audacious. We did what we thought we had to do. No one was trying to blow people's minds, or thinking, "Wow, this'll piss them off." People get the impression that you're trying to fuck with them and it's not true.

Chase also addressed the opinion the open-ended finale was insulting to the series' longtime fans:

I saw [opinions] that, "This was a huge fuck you to the audience." Why would we want to do that? Why would we entertain people for eight years only to give them the finger? We don't have contempt for the audience. [We] gave the audience credit for having intelligence and [an] attention span. We operated as though people don't need to be spoon-fed every single thing—their instincts and feelings and humanity will tell them what's going on.

In an interview with Brett Martin weeks after the finale's original broadcast, Chase reacted to the initial divided reception to the ending, saying,

[The ending] said much more than Tony facedown in a bowl of onion rings with a bullet in his head, or taking over the New York mob. Tony Soprano had been people's alter ego. They gleefully watched him rob, kill, pillage, lie, and cheat. They cheered him on. And then, all of a sudden, they wanted to see him punished for all that. They wanted "justice." I thought that was disgusting, frankly.

Chase also responded to criticism the ending provided no sense of finality:

This wasn't about "leaving the door open." There was nothing definite about what happened, but there was a trend on view—a definite sense of what Tony's future looks like. [Whatever] happened that night or some other night doesn't matter.

He offered definitive statements regarding the futures of A.J. and Meadow, saying,

A.J.'s not going to be citizen-soldier or help the world; he'll probably be a low-level movie producer. But he's not going to be a killer like his father, is he? Meadow may not be a pediatrician or a lawyer, but she's not going to be a housewife-whore like her mother. She'll learn to operate in the world in ways Carmela never did. Tiny, little bits of progress—that's how it works.

Chase later referred to scenes from previous episodes, specifically "Stage 5" and "Soprano Home Movies", appearing to hint at fan theories and critical interpretations:

There are no esoteric clues. Everything that pertains to [the finale] was in that episode, and in the episodes before that, and the seasons before. There [were] indications of what the end is like, [such as] when Gerry Torciano was killed. Silvio was not aware a gun [was] fired until Gerry was [shot]. That's the way things happen: It's already going on by the time you even notice it. I'm not saying anything. And I'm not trying to be coy. [But] to explain it would diminish it.

In an April 2015 interview with DGA Quarterly, Chase said viewers and critics over-analyzed the series' ending:

The ceiling I was going for was "don't stop believing". It [is] very simple and on the nose. That's what I wanted people to believe. There are attachments we make that are worth so much and we're lucky to have been able to experience them. Life is short. Either [Tony dies] here or some other time. But in spite of that, it's really worth it. So don't stop believing.

In a January 2019 interview with Alan Sepinwall and Matt Zoller Seitz for their book The Sopranos Sessions, Chase inadvertently referred to "that death scene" when discussing the finale. Seitz asked Chase if he was aware of his choice of words to which the latter, after a long pause, responded, "Fuck you guys." Chase said that he did not want to do a "straight death scene", and revealed he envisioned Tony's death occurring earlier in the series, during a meeting with Johnny Sack. However, Chase clarified his statement, saying he was not describing the final draft, but an earlier idea he abandoned.

In a November 2021 interview with The Hollywood Reporter, Chase made comments which were interpreted as confirmation that Tony Soprano dies. He revealed he envisioned Tony's death occurring during a meeting, which would take place after traveling from New Jersey to New York (the reverse of the route in the opening sequence of every episode). After driving past a small restaurant on Ocean Park Boulevard, Chase instead decided, if Tony should die, it would be "in a place like that". However, later that same month, Zoller Seitz released a statement on Chase's behalf denying this, with Chase saying, "Everybody who believes I said Tony is dead in a Hollywood Reporter article: works for me. Now you"ll [sic] stop fucking asking me."

In a January 2024 interview with TV Insider, celebrating the 25th anniversary of the show's premiere, Chase clarified his previous comment about Tony's fate. According to Chase, the final scene implied that Tony could die, not that he did die.

In a September 2024 interview at the close of the 2-part Max feature Wise Guy: David Chase and the Sopranos, Chase said, "I think what I was thinking about was, the universe goes on and on. You may not go on and on but the universe is going to go on and on. The movie's going to keep going." Referencing a discussion in the show about a poem by Robert Frost, he added, "There was that scene between Meadow and AJ [where AJ says] 'I thought black meant death!'. So that was in my head also. See now people will say, see he admitted it, Tony died. The truth is...". This was followed by the interview cutting to black.

== Reception ==
=== Ratings ===
According to Nielsen ratings, an average of 11.9 million viewers watched "Made in America" on its United States premiere date of Sunday, June 10, 2007. This was a 49% increase from the previous episode and the show's best ratings for both parts of the sixth season. It was also the show's largest audience since the season five premiere.

=== Critical response ===
==== Initial ====
"Made in America" initially received mainly favorable to semi-favorable reviews from critics, although early fan reception was mixed-to-negative, described by one critic as "a mixture of admiration and anger". During the weeks following the episode's original broadcast, "Made in America" and its closing scene, in particular, became the subject of much discussion and analysis. Several new interpretations and explanations of the ending were presented in magazines and on blogs, which led many critics and fans to reevaluate the ending.

Marisa Carroll of PopMatters awarded "Made in America" a score of 8 out of 10 and particularly praised the final scene as one of the best of the series. Mark Farinella of The Sun Chronicle called the episode "[a] perfect ending to a perfect TV series." Owen Gleiberman of Entertainment Weekly called "Made in America" "the perfect ending" and wrote about the final scene, "On shock of that cut to black, the marvelous way it got you to roll the scene over, again and again, in your mind's eye. Rather than bringing the series to a close, that blackout made The Sopranos live forever." Tim Goodman of the San Francisco Chronicle characterized the finale as "[a]n ending befitting genius of Sopranos" and wrote that "Chase managed, with this ending, to be true to reality [...] while also steering clear of trite TV conventions." Frazier Moore of the Associated Press called the episode "brilliant" and wrote that "Chase was true to himself." Kim Reed of Television Without Pity gave "Made in America" the highest score of A+ and praised it for staying true to the show. Alan Sepinwall of The Star-Ledger called the finale "satisfying" and wrote that the episode "fit[s] perfectly with everything Chase has done on this show before." Chicago Tribune critic Maureen Ryan's first review was mixed; she criticized the final scene for not providing any closure. Ryan later wrote: "Chase got me totally wound up, then ripped me away from that world. I was really mad at first [...] I still think what Chase did was, all due respect, kind of jerky. But minutes after the finale ended, I started laughing." Boston Globe's Matthew Gilbert thought that his television had lost power at the ending: "What will I do? Will I get fired? What will my second career be, because no other news outlet will ever hire the infamous writer who let the 'Sopranos' finale get away". After realizing that the black screen was intentional, he wrote "the finale, while mysterious, was true to the series as a whole. Rather than an ending that would stop the conversation about Tony Soprano, Chase gave us an ending that will keep us talking".

==== Retrospective ====
Retrospective reviews of "Made in America" have been highly positive; the episode has been included on several lists of the best series finales of all time. Alan Sepinwall of The Star-Ledger wrote, in an essay analyzing the finale one year after its original broadcast, that he felt the episode was "brilliant."

In 2009, Arlo J. Wiley of Blogcritics wrote: "by focusing on that last ambiguous parting shot from creator David Chase, we run the risk of forgetting just how beautifully structured and executed an hour of television 'Made in America' is" and ranked it as the eighth-best series finale ever.

Also in 2009, Stacey Wilson of Film.com named "Made in America" one of the 10 best series finales of all time and wrote: "Crude, rude and no time for emotional B.S., this finale was a delicious end to a show that reveled in the ugliness of humanity."

TV Guide included "Made in America" in their "TV's Best Finales Ever" feature, writing: "What's there to say about this finale that hasn't already been said? The much-anticipated closer had everyone waiting to see if Tony was finally going to go from whacker to whackee. Instead, they got Journey, a greasy plate of onion rings and a black screen. But, the fact that we're still talking about it proves—for better or worse—that the episode did its job."

In 2011, the finale was ranked #2 on the TV Guide Network special TV's Most Unforgettable Finales.

=== Awards and nominations ===
In 2007, "Made in America" won an Emmy Award in the category of Outstanding Writing for a Drama Series at the 59th Primetime Emmy Awards. It was the only category the episode was nominated in. This is the third and final time series creator/executive producer David Chase won the award for his writing of the series.

In 2008, Chase was nominated for a Directors Guild of America Award in the category of Drama Series (Night) but lost to fellow Sopranos director Alan Taylor, who won for directing the pilot episode of Mad Men, a series created by former Sopranos writer Matthew Weiner.

Also in 2008, editor Sidney Wolinsky won an American Cinema Editors Eddie Award in the category of Best Edited One-Hour Series for Non-Commercial Television.
