= The Blue Comet =

- The Sopranos episode
- Episode no.: Season 6 Episode 20
- Directed by: Alan Taylor
- Written by: David Chase; Matthew Weiner
- Cinematography by: Phil Abraham
- Editing by: William B. Stich
- Production code: S620
- Original air date: June 3, 2007
- Running time: 50 minutes

Episode chronology
← Previous "The Second Coming"	Next → "Made in America"
- The Sopranos season 6

"The Blue Comet" is the 85th and penultimate episode of the American crime drama The Sopranos, the eighth episode of the second half of the show's sixth season and 20th overall episode of the season. Written by series creator and showrunner David Chase and Matthew Weiner, and directed by Alan Taylor, it premiered on June 3, 2007, on HBO in the United States. It had nearly eight million viewers on its premiere.

Much praise was directed at the episode's pacing and efficient build-up of suspense as well as the execution of the gunfire scenes toward the end of the episode. The episode was also praised for story elements concerning the escalation of the conflict between the rivaling Mafia families of the show and for the conclusion that it brought to the professional and personal relationship between the characters Tony Soprano and Jennifer Melfi.

== Starring ==
- James Gandolfini as Tony Soprano
- Lorraine Bracco as Jennifer Melfi
- Edie Falco as Carmela Soprano
- Michael Imperioli as Christopher Moltisanti *
- Dominic Chianese as Corrado Soprano, Jr. *
- Steven Van Zandt as Silvio Dante
- Tony Sirico as Paulie Gualtieri
- Robert Iler as Anthony Soprano, Jr.
- Jamie-Lynn Sigler as Meadow Soprano
- Aida Turturro as Janice Soprano Baccalieri
- Steven R. Schirripa as Bobby Baccalieri
- Frank Vincent as Phil Leotardo
- John Ventimiglia as Artie Bucco
- Dan Grimaldi as Patsy Parisi
- Sharon Angela as Rosalie Aprile
- Kathrine Narducci as Charmaine Bucco

* = credit only

=== Guest starring ===
- Gregory Antonacci as Butch DeConcini
- Arthur J. Nascarella as Carlo Gervasi
- Peter Bogdanovich as Elliot Kupferberg
- Matt Servitto as Agent Harris
- Carlo Giuliano as Italo
- John "Cha Cha" Ciarcia as Albie Cianflone
- Artie Pasquale as Burt Gervasi
- Edoardo Ballerini as Corky Caporale
- Matilda Downey as Yaryna Kastropovic
- Aleks Shaklin as Yaryna's Father
- Rick Aiello as Raymond "Ray-Ray" D'Abaldo
- Emily Wickersham as Rhiannon Flammer
- Lenny Venito as James "Murmur" Zancone
- John Mainieri as Ira Shortz
- Mimi Lieber as Stacey Bellows
- Adam Heller as Arnold Bellows
- Connie Teng as Yaolin
- Anthony Ribustello as Dante Greco
- Miryam Coppersmith as Sophia Baccalieri
- Angelo Massagli as Bobby Baccalieri, Jr.
- Frank John Hughes as Walden Belfiore
- Joseph Perrino as Jason Gervasi
- Merissa Morin as Isabel
- Davide Borella as Roberto
- John Cenatiempo as Anthony Maffei
- Dominic Chianese, Jr. as Dominic
- Pete Bucossi as Petey B.
- Henry Glovinsky as Derek
- Jeff Talbott as Father
- Eric Mangini as himself
- Julie Mangini as herself
- Michael Drayer as Jason Parisi

== Synopsis ==
A.J. recognizes another patient: Rhiannon Flammer, Hernan O'Brien's old girlfriend, who has had food issues and depression. After discharge, they continue seeing each other.

Jennifer Melfi is at a dinner party with colleagues, including Elliot Kupferberg. The conversation turns to a recent study claiming criminal sociopaths take advantage of talk therapy. Kupferberg angers and shocks her by revealing that Tony Soprano is her patient. However, she reads the study at home and is convinced of its findings. At his next session, Tony wavers between contempt for A.J.'s depression and gratitude for his in-patient care. Her responses become sarcastic and aggressive. When she says she intends to cease treating him, he is taken aback and hurt: she waits for him to go, then closes the door on him.

Janice tells Tony that, as far as they can tell, Junior's money has run out, and she asks him to contribute, together with her and Bobby, so that he does not have to go into a state institution. Tony scornfully refuses.

Silvio uses a garrote to kill Burt Gervasi, a soldato of the Soprano crime family who has been negotiating with the New York family. Phil speaks contemptuously to Albie and Butchie about "this pygmy thing over in Jersey." Butchie and Albie meet with their own subordinates and order the murders of Tony, Silvio, and Bobby to be done swiftly in one 24-hour period. The FBI learn from an informant that something is being planned, and Agent Harris warns Tony that his life is in danger.

Tony decides to act first and kill Phil, using the cousins, the Italian hitmen who performed the hit on Rusty Millio. The order is eventually passed down to Corky Caporale, who makes contact with them. But Phil is in hiding, and they kill the wrong man, the father of Phil's comare — and kill his daughter too.

Tony realizes the urgent danger, and orders Silvio to tell everyone in the family to go to their safe house, but it is too late. Almost simultaneously, Bobby is killed in a model railway store and, leaving the Bada Bing together, Silvio and Patsy are intercepted by two Lupertazzi hit men. Silvio is shot several times and severely wounded; the doctors say he may never regain consciousness. Patsy escapes unhurt.

Tony goes home and breaks the news to Carmela. He is going to a safe house; she must go to some other safe place. He goes upstairs to A.J.'s bedroom, where he now spends most of his time. Rhiannon is there with him and Tony sends her away. Tony tries to explain things gently. When A.J. starts whimpering about depressive symptoms, he pulls him out of bed and throws him onto the floor, demanding that he pack his things.

At night, Tony, Paulie, Carlo, Walden Belfiore and Dante Greco drive to an old suburban safe house. Tony goes upstairs and lies down fully clothed, holding the AR-10 rifle that Bobby gave him for his birthday while reminiscing on his conversation with Bobby about the possibility of being killed.

== Deceased ==
- Burt Gervasi: garrotted to death by Silvio Dante for betraying his crime family and working with the Lupertazzis.
- Alec Kastropovic (Ukrainian mistress's father): shot dead in the head by Italo, the Italian hitman, who mistook him for Phil Leotardo, who he was supposed to murder on orders from Tony Soprano to eliminate the Lupertazzi threat to his crime family.
- Yaryna Kastropovic (Phil Leotardo's Ukrainian mistress): shot in the abdomen and then shot dead in the head by Italo, murdered for being present at the failed Leotardo hit.
- Robert "Bobby Bacala" Baccalieri Jr.: shot to death by two Lupertazzi hitmen on orders from Phil Leotardo, as part of Phil's move to quickly wipe out the DiMeo family's management after continued long arguments and fights between the two families.
- Unnamed Biker: Fell off his motorcycle after being overtaken by a car driven by two Lupertazzi hitmen, of which he is then run over by another car.

== Final appearances ==
"The Blue Comet" marks the final appearances in The Sopranos of these main or longtime recurring characters:

- Jennifer Melfi: Tony Soprano's psychotherapist since the start of the series. Originally contacted to help treat his panic attacks, Tony also used his talk therapy sessions to deal with stresses in his life and gain advice on how to act in his personal and criminal life. Melfi was, at times, Tony's romantic interest, though his advances were consistently rebuffed.
- Arthur "Artie" Bucco: a restaurateur, owner of Nuovo Vesuvio, a common mobster hangout, and Tony's close friend from childhood. After the fall-out with Davey Scatino in 2000 Artie was Tony's only remaining civilian friend.
- Charmaine Bucco: the wife of Artie Bucco and a childhood friend of Carmela and Tony Soprano. Throughout the series, she urged Artie not to deal with the mobsters in his career and life, but eventually started to seemingly tolerate their gatherings in their restaurant.
- Elliot Kupferberg: Melfi's own psychotherapist and mentor who often urged her to drop Tony Soprano as a patient. Kupferberg was an enthusiast of the Mafia.

== Production ==
=== Writing ===
The episode's general plot outline was developed collectively by the writing staff of The Sopranos, which for the second part of the sixth season consisted of showrunner and head writer David Chase, executive producer and co-showrunner Terence Winter, executive producer Matthew Weiner and supervising producers and writing team Diane Frolov and Andrew Schneider. After the main story had been outlined, the script for "The Blue Comet" was written by Chase and Weiner. It is Chase's 29th writing credit for the series (including story credits) and Weiner's 12th and final. The penultimate episode marks the fifth time Chase and Weiner have collaborated on a The Sopranos script, following "The Test Dream" of season five and "Kaisha" (also with Winter), "Soprano Home Movies" (also with Frolov and Schneider) and "Kennedy and Heidi" of season six.

The research study that Elliot Kupferberg introduces to Jennifer Melfi, which she later carefully reads and which makes her decide to finally drop Tony Soprano as her patient, is an actual three-volume study called The Criminal Personality, written by Dr. Samuel Yochelson and Dr. Stanton Samenow, published between 1977 and 1986. David Chase discovered the study when he and some Sopranos writers attended a psychiatric conference. Chase further asked forensic psychologist Nancy Duggan to analyze Tony Soprano's mental state and the progress of his psychotherapy with Melfi; Duggan also opined that talk therapy was enabling Melfi's patient to commit crimes and justify his actions for himself. The Criminal Personality greatly impressed Chase after he read it and he decided that its introduction in the show would spell the end of Tony and Melfi's psychotherapy story arc in the series. After the airing of the episode, psychotherapists reported an outpouring of questions and concern from their clientele about the ethics of dropping patients unilaterally. Chase also commented about the seeming lack of finality in Tony Soprano's therapy, stating that its depiction was most realistic as psychotherapy most often is marked with moments of progress but is essentially an endless process until one party decides he or she has had enough of it. Lorraine Bracco said she was "upset" at the way her character was written off the show. She said, "I just felt like he wanted me to get rid of Tony. I felt that he did it in a very abrupt way. I don't think that she should have done it that way. I would have liked for it to have been more meaningful. I think she cared for Tony. Even though he was a fuck-up and he was never going to really straighten out. But I think she really cared for him. You don't spend seven years with someone and then discard them. I felt bad about that."

Chase called Steve Schirripa in January 2007 to inform him of his character Bobby Baccalieri's death in the episode. Schirripa found Chase's choice to call him surprising, as Chase usually took the actors for characters who die aside at read-throughs and inform them of their demise and how it occurs. Chase visited Schirripa to discuss his character's death, with Chase telling him Bobby would be killed in a train store. Schirripa then told Chase how he hoped he impressed him with his work on the show; Chase assured him of his happiness.

The cardboard cutout of Silvio Dante that appears near the end of the episode in the safehouse was added by the writers as a way to give the character some sort of presence in the scene. The writers created the safehouse as an unoccupied house kept for emergencies and storage of various items, such as the promotional cutout of Silvio for the Bada Bing!.

=== Casting ===
Peter Bucossi, the stunt coordinator for the show for all six seasons, plays the role of Petey B. in this episode (a character also named after him), one of the Lupertazzi crime family hoodlums. Petey is the driver of "Ray Ray" D'Abaldo's car that attacks Silvio and Patsy when they attempt to flee the Bada Bing!.

=== Filming ===
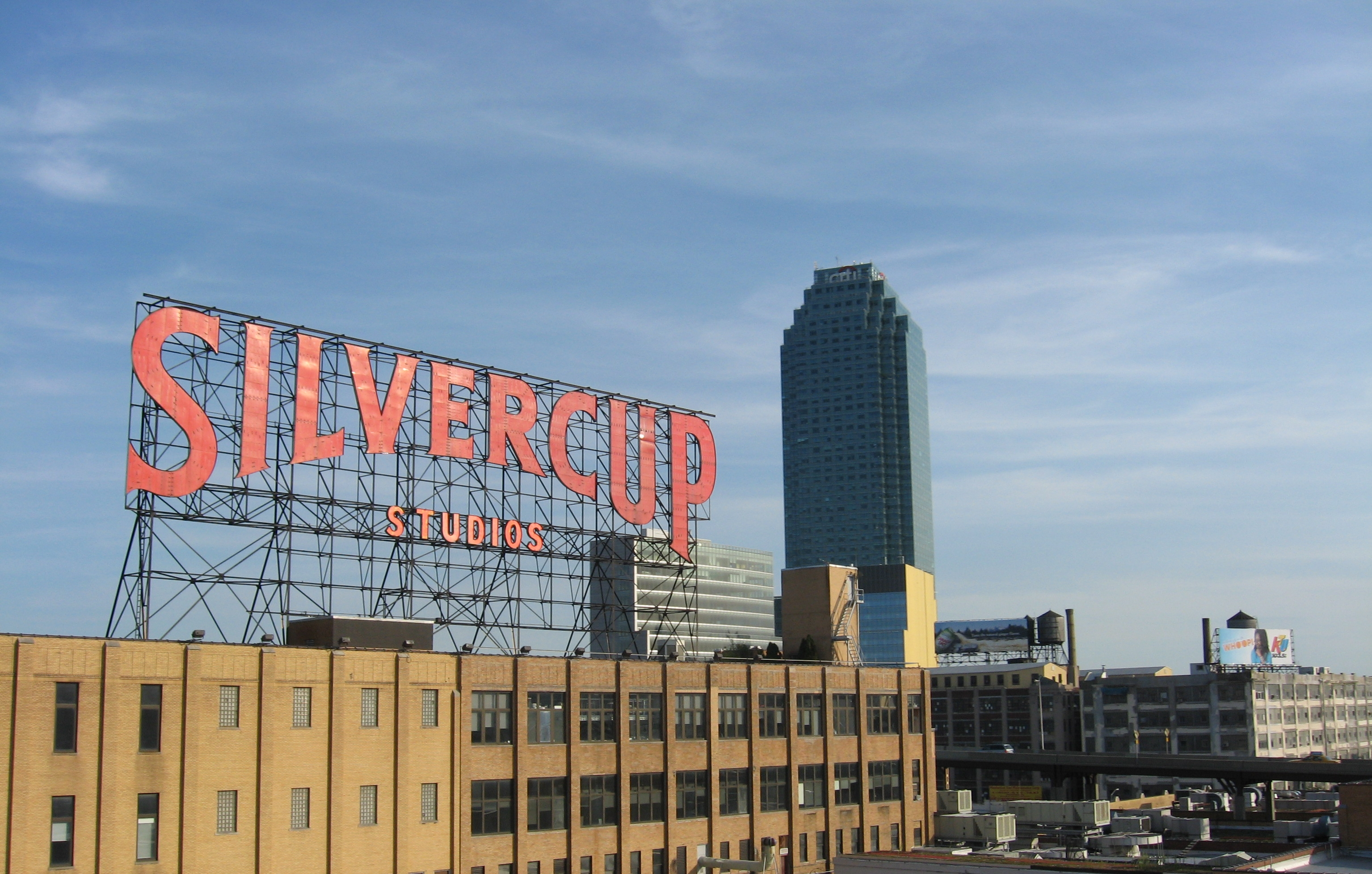
Interior scenes set at the Soprano residence, back room of the strip club Bada Bing!, Italian restaurant Nuovo Vesuvio and Melfi's psychiatrist's office were filmed at Silvercup Studios.

"The Blue Comet" was directed by Alan Taylor and photographed by Phil Abraham. Both had worked intermittently on the show in the same capacities since the first season. The penultimate episode marks Taylor's ninth credit as director and Abraham's 47th credit as director of photography; it is the final credit of the series for both. Before filming commenced, David Chase and Taylor held a pre-production director's meeting—called a "tone meeting" by the crew—in which Chase explained how he envisioned the filming of the episode's scenes in great detail and provided directions for Taylor to follow during principal photography.

"The Blue Comet" was filmed in January and February 2007, primarily at the show's usual filming locations: exterior and some interior scenes were filmed on location in New Jersey and New York while the majority of the interior scenes were shot at Silvercup Studios, New York City. The Soprano residence, meat market Satriale's, strip club Bada Bing! and Italian restaurant Nuovo Vesuvio—four of the most frequently recurring and recognizable backdrops of the series—are all featured prominently in the episode. Bobby Baccalieri's death scene was filmed on February 14 at a train store in Long Island. Despite this, Steven Schirripa still returned for some pick-ups after filming his character's death.

Some scenes were set in environments not typically featured in the series. The gunfire scene that takes place in a model railroading store was filmed on location at a store called Trainland in Lynbrook, New York. Scenes set at the Averna Social Club, a meeting place for the Lupertazzi family in the context of the series, were filmed at a bar on Manhattan's Mulberry Street, New York City. Janice and Bobby's residence, formerly owned by Johnny Sack, appears briefly in the episode; the scene was shot on location in North Caldwell, New Jersey.

=== Post-production ===
The editing of "The Blue Comet" was done by William B. Stich in close consultation with Chase. During post-production, Chase selected the music for the episode, using previously recorded and released songs he saw fit for particular scenes and rearranged the filmed scenes into their final order. Some filmed scenes were cut during editing. One involved Burt Gervasi telling Silvio Dante that he has begun cooperating with the Lupertazzi family, a scene that was meant as a setup for the murder that ended up as the episode's opening.

== Music ==
- When Bobby, Sil, and Tony go out to eat, the intermezzo from Cavalleria rusticana is playing.
- The Doors' "When the Music's Over" is playing in Bada Bing! when Bobby summons Paulie to the backroom to discuss the hit on Phil.
- When Patsy and Silvio are packing up to leave the Bada Bing, "Antisaint" by Chevelle is playing muffled in the background.
- During the shootout at the Bada Bing's parking lot, Nat King Cole's "Ramblin' Rose" is playing on Patsy's car radio.
- The song played in the final scene and over the end credits is an extended instrumental version of Tindersticks' song "Running Wild." Another one of Tindersticks' songs, "Tiny Tears," was previously prominently featured in the Season 1 episode "Isabella" during scenes of Tony's lethargic state prior to his assassination attempt.

== Reception ==
=== Ratings ===
According to Nielsen ratings, "The Blue Comet" attracted an average of eight million American viewers when first broadcast in the United States on HBO. This was the show's second best ratings for the second part of the sixth season. Only the following week's series finale, which drew 11.9 million viewers, received higher numbers.

=== Critical response ===
"The Blue Comet" received universal acclaim following its original broadcast and has since then frequently been named by critics as one of the best episodes of the series. Tom Biro of TV Squad was impressed with the episode because of "the way we're beginning to close the door on the lives of some people and get an idea on who will be around at the end and who won't" and because "we're treated to something thrilling not only in story, but visually as well." Biro awarded "The Blue Comet" the site's highest score of 7.

Geoffrey Dunn of Metro Silicon Valley stated that "Chase orchestrated the tension to a full crescendo." Tim Goodman of the San Francisco Chronicle wrote "In this penultimate episode (which David Chase co-wrote), you can see the veil of surprise, of artistic feints, red herrings, theory-bating and any other cool narrative device totally vanish. It's as if things snuck up on us. Time is not just running out, it's almost all gone. Action needed to step forth and be counted. And so, true to form historically, the second to last episode had more than it's [sic] fair share of Big Moments." Goodman also called Bobby's death scene "priceless" and "Really well done." "For the most part, the narrative, shot in shortest, most pause-free scenes...was classic gangland payback," wrote Mary McNamara about the episode for the Los Angeles Times.

Heather Havrilesky of Salon wrote "No sad music, no slow motion, no teary funeral, no time for condolences. When the blood-dimmed tide finally rolled in during last night's penultimate Sopranos episode, an eerie quiet settled in."

Matt Roush of TV Guide gave the episode a favorable review, writing "TV's landmark family crime drama went on a bloody rampage this week, just as we expected might happen in the next-to-last episode. [...] It was a sensational way to get us primed for Sunday's series finale."

Maureen Ryan of the Chicago Tribune wrote that "[The] second-to-last episode was certainly a classic" and praised it for its suspenseful storytelling.

Lisa Schwarzbaum of Entertainment Weekly offered "The Blue Comet" a favorable estimation, writing "Every moment in this bloody, bullet-riddled penultimate episode is about regular, familiar old ways that have now gone terribly, irreversibly awry. [...] In the last hours of this epic drama, every detail glitters with bitter meaning."

Matt Zoller Seitz described the episode as "the most atypically typical whack-fest the show has served up in quite some time" and "an orgy of Mafia mayhem." Zoller Seitz also praised the final therapy scene between Tony Soprano and Jennifer Melfi for its depth.

Alan Sepinwall of The Star Ledger called the penultimate episode "one of the best—and certainly one of the busiest—episodes in the history of The Sopranos," further describing it as "a superb, scary, thrilling episode." He also characterized Bobby's death scene as "a little masterpiece of editing."

Brian Tallerico of UGO called the episode "mind-blowing" and "intense," wrote that "[he] really didn't expect David Chase to take his show out with this much gunfire" and gave it an "A," the site's second-highest score.

Brian Zoromski of IGN awarded the episode a score of 9.1 out of 10, writing "Overall, 'Blue Comet' was a very well done, sometimes shocking, build-up to next week's series finale."

=== Awards ===
In 2007, Lorraine Bracco was nominated for an Emmy Award in the category of Outstanding Supporting Actress in a Drama Series for her performance in "The Blue Comet" but lost to Grey's Anatomy's Katherine Heigl at the 59th Primetime Emmy Awards. Bracco had previously been nominated three times in the category of Outstanding Lead Actress in a Drama Series for playing Jennifer Melfi. In 2008, sound mixers Mathew Price, Kevin Burns and Todd Orr were nominated for a Cinema Audio Society Award in the category of Outstanding Achievement in Sound Mixing – Television.
