= The Second Coming (The Sopranos) =

- The Sopranos episode
- Episode no.: Season 6 Episode 19
- Directed by: Tim Van Patten
- Written by: Terence Winter
- Cinematography by: Alik Sakharov
- Production code: 619
- Original air date: May 20, 2007
- Running time: 53 minutes

Episode chronology
← Previous "Kennedy and Heidi"	Next → "The Blue Comet"
- The Sopranos season 6

"The Second Coming" is the 84th episode of the American crime drama The Sopranos, the seventh episode of the second half of the show's sixth season, and the 19th episode of the season overall. In the episode, the Soprano and Lupertazzi crime families encounter business and interpersonal conflicts, while A.J. Soprano's depression leads him to attempt suicide.

Written by Terence Winter and directed by Tim Van Patten, it premiere on May 20, 2007, on HBO in the U.S. With nearly 7.3 million viewers, the episode was the seventh straight Sopranos episode to rank number one on the Nielsen U.S. cable television ratings and had positive critical reviews. At the 60th Writers Guild of America Awards in 2008, the episode won an award for outstanding writing.

== Starring ==
- James Gandolfini as Tony Soprano
- Lorraine Bracco as Dr. Jennifer Melfi
- Edie Falco as Carmela Soprano
- Michael Imperioli as Christopher Moltisanti**
- Dominic Chianese as Corrado Soprano, Jr.*
- Steven Van Zandt as Silvio Dante
- Tony Sirico as Paulie Gualtieri
- Robert Iler as Anthony Soprano, Jr.
- Jamie-Lynn Sigler as Meadow Soprano
- Aida Turturro as Janice Soprano Baccalieri*
- Steven R. Schirripa as Bobby Baccalieri
- Frank Vincent as Phil Leotardo
- Ray Abruzzo as Little Carmine Lupertazzi
- Dan Grimaldi as Patsy Parisi
- Arthur Nascarella as Carlo Gervasi

* = credit only ** = photo only

=== Guest starring ===
- Peter Bogdanovich as Dr. Elliot Kupferberg
- Gregory Antonacci as Butch DeConcini
- Matt Servitto as Agent Dwight Harris
- Cara Buono as Kelli Lombardo Moltisanti
- Armen Garo as Salvatore "Coco" Cogliano
- Michael Countryman as Dr. Richard Vogel
- Daniel Sauli as Patrick Parisi
- Frank John Hughes as Walden Belfiore
- John "Cha Cha" Ciarcia as Albie Cianflone
- John Cenatiempo as Anthony Maffei
- Felix Solis as Edgar Ramirez
- Michael Kelly as Agent Ron Goddard
- Lindsay Campbell as Professor Kline
- Dominic Chianese, Jr. as Dominic
- Joey Perillo as John Stefano
- Edward Furs as Driver
- Taleb Adlah as Ahmed (photo only)
- Donnie Keshawarz as Muhammad (photo only)

== Synopsis ==
Tony goes with Silvio and Bobby to a sitdown with Phil in New York. He offers a compromise about the asbestos removal, but Phil rejects it out of hand. In response, Tony takes Phil's men Coco and Butchie off the payroll from another construction project. When they hear of this from the foreman, they viciously beat him up and steal the cash in his wallet.

A drunken Coco notices Meadow in a restaurant. He touches her cheek and makes some lewd comments, implying she has cream on her mouth and that he'd like to "add to it". Meadow reluctantly tells her father. Enraged, Tony finds Coco and pistol-whips and curb stomps him, beating him near death. This assault opens a deep rift between the Soprano and Lupertazzi families. Little Carmine tells Tony that he will once again broker a truce meeting with Phil, who has shut down one of their joint construction projects. Tony admits, "I lost it, timing couldn't have been worse." But Phil refuses to meet with them when they arrive at his home; from behind a second-floor window, he spews profanities as they walk away.

FBI Agents Harris and Goddard visit Satriale's and ask Tony to look at some photos. Tony identifies Ahmed and Muhammad.

When Dr. Melfi sees Dr. Kupferberg, he shares with her the results of a recent study which has shown that sociopaths are not helped by talk therapy but rather only further enabled by it, perhaps even "sharpening their skills as con men" in the process.

Meadow reveals that her new boyfriend is Patrick Parisi, Patsy's eldest son, and that, inspired by him, she has decided to enter law school.

A.J. remains depressed. Moved by W. B. Yeats' apocalyptic poem "The Second Coming", he tries to kill himself in the family pool. With one foot tied by a rope to a cinder block, and with a plastic bag over his head, he jumps in. But the rope is too long to keep him submerged. He struggles: he can neither drown nor save himself. Tony happens to come home. Hearing shouts, he goes out. He runs and jumps, wearing a suit and tie, into the pool. He saves A.J. and hauls up the cinder block. At first, he is shocked and furious, but A.J. is sobbing; he cradles his son in his lap, saying "Come on, baby, you're all right, baby."

A.J. is put on Valium and admitted to a psychiatric ward. At a session with his therapist and his parents, he speaks of resentments going back to 2nd grade, and quotes his grandmother at the end of her life: "It's all a big nothing." This session occurs just after Tony's assault on Coco; as he listens, he notices one of Coco's bloody teeth in the cuff of his pant leg. Tony and Carmela both feel guilty about the attempted suicide, and in a fight, each blames the other.

Tony scornfully rejects Dr. Melfi's suggestion that A.J. was calling for help and, at some level, knew the rope was too long. He blames himself and his own history with mental illness.

== Final appearances ==
- Kelli Lombardo Moltisanti: widow of Christopher Moltisanti

== Production ==
- The episode was named after the William Butler Yeats poem "The Second Coming", which A.J. studies in college. Paul Brownfield of the Los Angeles Times observed symbolism between this episode and the poem, namely "bloodshed, sadness and death." Additionally, as Alan Sepinwall pointed out on his Star-Ledger blog about the show, the Yeats poem was previously quoted in the season five episode "Cold Cuts".
- Arthur J. Nascarella (Carlo Gervasi) is promoted to the main cast and billed in the opening credits but only for this episode.

== Music ==
- The song "Ridin'", by Chamillionaire, is played by A.J. when he wakes up in the morning at the beginning of the episode.
- The song "Please Mr. Postman", by The Marvelettes, is playing when Tony, Silvio, Paulie, Carlo, Walden, and Bobby discuss Tony's trip to Vegas and their respective drug experiences.
- The song "Suspicious Minds", by Elvis Presley, is playing in the back room of Satriale's while Tony meets with Patsy and (later) Little Carmine.
- The song "Into the Ocean", by Blue October, is playing during A.J. and Meadow's conversation in his room.
- The song "Caravan", by The Brian Setzer Orchestra, plays when Tony beats and curb-stomps Coco following Coco's comments to Meadow.
- The song "Ninna Ninna – Lullaby", that plays over the closing credits, is a traditional Sardinian song from the Smithsonian Folkways album Italian Folk Songs and Dances (1955). Its original, traditional title was "Sa corsicana".

== Reception ==
=== Ratings ===
On its premiere, "The Second Coming" had 7.34 million viewers, leading the Nielsen weekly U.S. cable ratings. This was the seventh straight Sopranos episode to rank number one on the weekly ratings.

=== Critical reception ===
Television Without Pity graded the episode with an A+, with some pointed comments about A.J.'s scenes, for instance: "...AJ has caught plenty of breaks in his life, starting with being born to rich parents who give him pretty much anything he wants." Reed also responded to A.J. complaining to Meadow about his depression: "AJ makes it hard to have empathy for him."

IGN rated the episode 8.6 points out of 10, with Dan Iverson commenting: "Never before have we felt more depressed after watching an episode of television."

For TV Squad, in a review rating the episode six points out of seven, Tom Biro praised the plot developments as "mesh[ing] even more than usual" with drama. Similarly, Matt Zoller Seitz cited this episode as an example of The Sopranos being "a consistently pessimistic, often wickedly honest vision of human nature."

Gary Susman observed on Entertainment Weekly: "The looming battle between Phil's crew and Tony's crew...is shaping up as a battle between the old, emotionally stunted, spiritually empty way and the new, more open-minded, struggling-for-meaning way." Susman added that the scene of Coco making lewd comments to Meadow "crossed a line we'd never seen crossed on this show."

=== Awards ===
At the 60th Writers Guild of America Awards in 2008, "The Second Coming" won Outstanding Writing for a Drama Series.
