= Curb stomp =

Form of battery

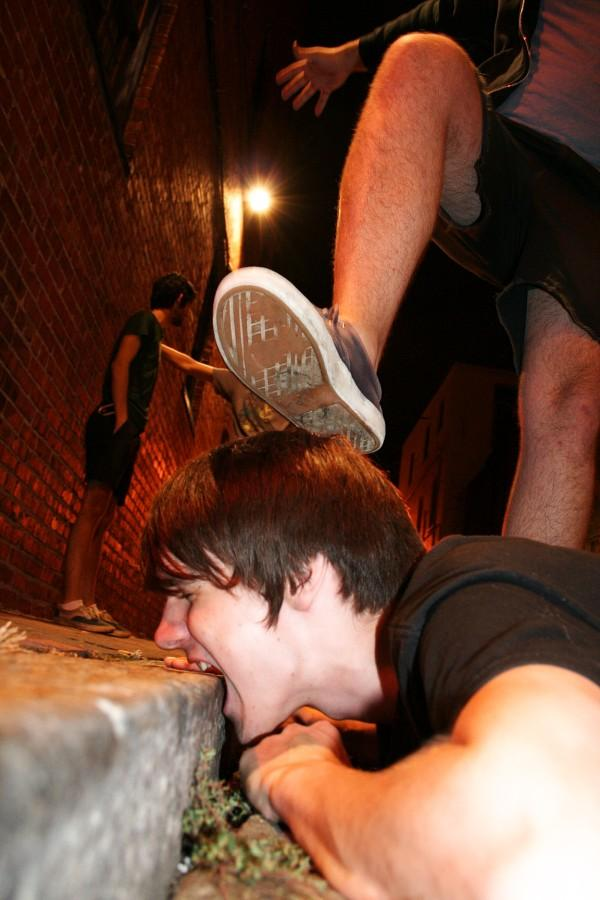
Illustrative recreation of the act of curbstomping

A curb stomp, also called curbing, curb painting, or making someone bite the curb, is a form of grievous assault or attempted murder in which a victim's jaw is forcefully placed on a curb and then stomped from behind, causing severe injuries or death.

== Notable incidents ==
- In July 2002, 16-year-old German Marinus Schöberl was tortured by young neo-Nazis in an abandoned pigsty in Oberuckersee (in the German state of Brandenburg) and was killed after being curb-stomped. The main perpetrator, who was 17 at the time of the killing, was released after serving eight years in prison.
- In 2003, Tacoma, Washington, resident Randall Townsend was murdered by four people. David Nikos Pillatos, Scotty James Butters, and Tristain Lynn Frye beat and kicked Townsend. Kurtis William Monschke curb-stomped Townsend, killing him. Monschke had recently been named head of the Washington chapter of Volksfront. "Prosecutors said the attack was meant to lift Monschke's status in the white supremacist movement and to earn Frye a pair of red shoelaces, with the red signifying the drawing of blood."

- Tristain Lynn Frye was sentenced to 13 years, nine months, for second-degree murder.
- Scotty James Butters and David Nikos Pillatos pled guilty to first-degree murder, accepted a plea agreement and testified against Monschke in exchange for being able to request that their imprisonment be no more than approximately 30 years. In June 2004, the U.S. Supreme Court ruled "a sentence longer than the standard range could not be ordered by a judge without action by a jury, meaning Butters and Pillatos could face no more than 31 years in prison."
- Kurtis William Monschke was convicted of aggravated first-degree murder and sentenced to life in prison without possibility of parole; in 2025, he was resentenced to 37 years and 6 months. His earliest possible date of release is in 2028. The incident has been described as a hate crime.

- On August 26, 2011, Dane Hall was curb stomped in an attack outside a gay bar in Salt Lake City, Utah. He lost six teeth and suffered a broken jaw as a result of the attack.

== Cultural references ==
- The earliest known literary reference of curb-stomping appeared in the 1995 graphic novel Sleepwalk and Other Stories by Adrian Tomine. The collection of stories features ‘Pink Frosting’, a two-page spread about a pedestrian involved in a road-rage incident who is brutally attacked by the driver and forced to perform curb biting before receiving a fatal blow to the back of his head by the driver’s boot.
- In the 1998 film American History X, white power skinhead Derek Vinyard murders Lawrence, a burglar who had tried to steal his truck, by curb-stomping him. The method of killing for both Marinus Schöberl and Randall Townsend appears to have been inspired by this scene.
- In the 2007 The Sopranos episode "The Second Coming", New Jersey mafia boss Tony Soprano curb-stomps New York mobster Salvatore "Coco" Cogliano on a step inside Coco's restaurant for making lewd comments to his daughter.
- WWE professional wrestler Seth Rollins uses a curb stomp as his finishing move. Rollins said that he stopped using the move between 2015 and 2018 as "from a PR standpoint ... it was too perceptually violent ... I never hurt anyone with it. It was just something we didn't want kids trying on each other". On the January 15, 2018, edition of Monday Night Raw, Rollins brought the move back, now referred to simply as a "stomp".
- In the 2017 film Brawl in Cell Block 99, an assault resembling a curb stomp takes place.
- In the 2017 film Leatherface, a main character murders another with a curb stomp.
- The JPEGMAFIA album Veteran contains a song called "Curb Stomp".
- In the 2021 film Willy's Wonderland, The Janitor (played by Nicolas Cage) curb stomps a sentient and murderous animatronic gorilla named Gus against a urinal, after the animatronic tried to kill him.
