= Tony Soprano =

Fictional character on television series The Sopranos

- The Sopranos character
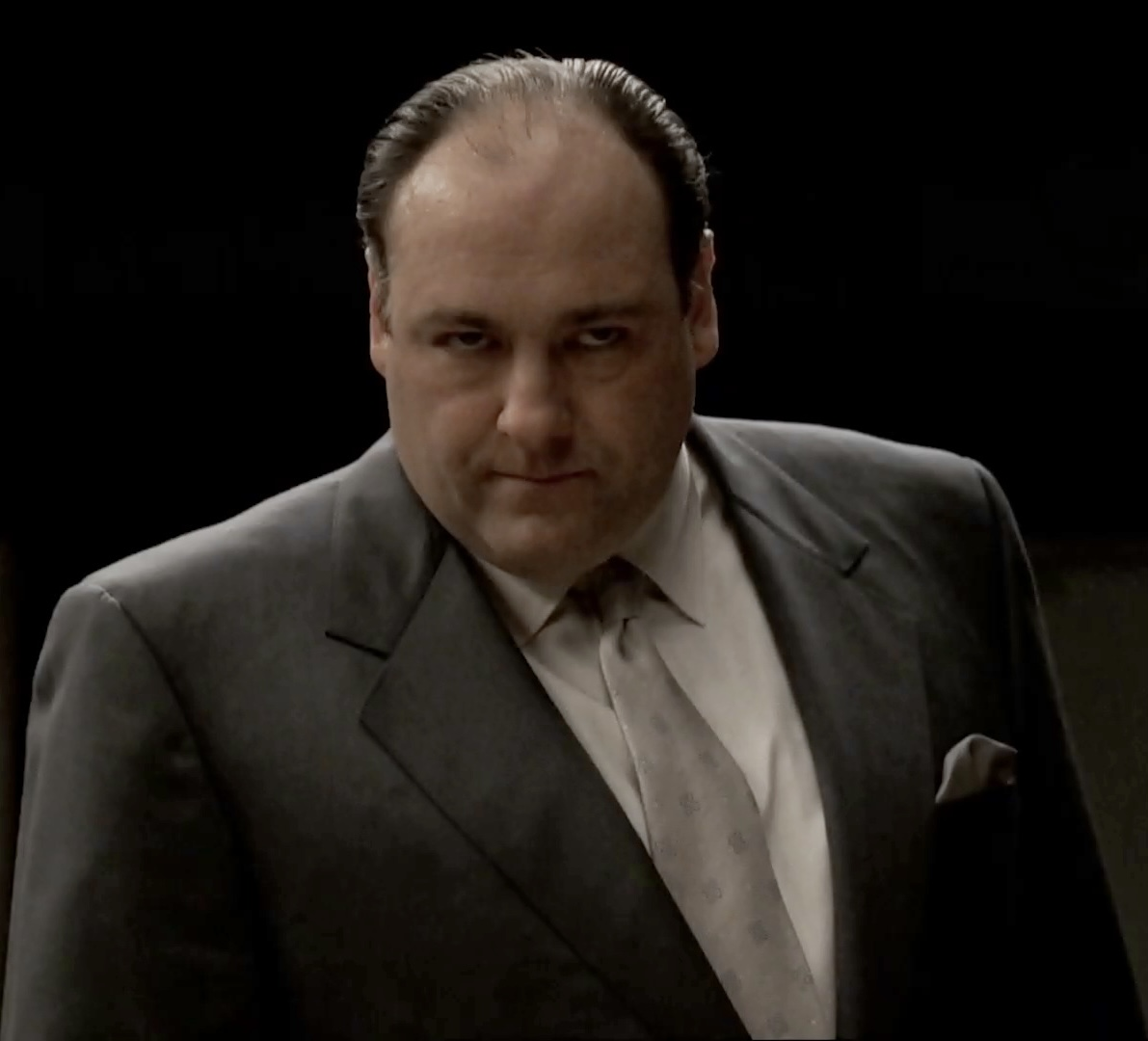
- James Gandolfini as Tony Soprano
- First appearance: "The Sopranos" (1999)
- Last appearance: The Many Saints of Newark (2021)
- Created by: David Chase
- Portrayed by: James Gandolfini; Michael Gandolfini (The Many Saints of Newark); Bobby Borriello (as a child); Mark Damiano II (as a child); Danny Petrillo (as a teenager); William Ludwig (The Many Saints of Newark, as a child)

In-universe information
- Full name: Anthony John Soprano Sr.
- Aliases: Ronald "Big Ron" F. Spears; Don Antonio; Kevin Finnerty; Mr. Petraglia; Der Bingle (FBI codename)
- Nicknames: T Tone; Leadbelly; Tony Uncle Johnny; Skip; Mr. Fat Mouth; Pork chop Tony-oni; The Bad Lieutenant
- Gender: Male
- Title(s): Captain (season 1); Underboss/De Facto Boss (seasons 2–5); Boss (seasons 6a–6b)
- Affiliation: DiMeo family
- Spouse: Carmela Soprano
- Significant others: Irina Peltsin (seasons 1–2); Gloria Trillo (season 3); Svetlana Kirilenko (season 4); Valentina la Paz (seasons 4–5); Julianna Skiff (season 6)
- Children: Meadow Soprano (daughter); Anthony Soprano Jr. (son)
- Relatives: Johnny Soprano (father); Livia Soprano (mother); Janice Soprano (sister); Barbara Giglione (sister); Corrado Soprano Jr. (uncle) Ercole Soprano (uncle); Tony Blundetto (cousin); Hugh DeAngelis (father-in-law); Mary DeAngelis (mother-in-law); Christopher Moltisanti (cousin-in-law)
- Nationality: Italian-American

Anthony John Soprano, Sr., portrayed by James Gandolfini, is a fictional character and the protagonist of the HBO crime drama television series The Sopranos. He is a member of the Italian-American Mafia and, later in the series, becomes the boss of the fictional DiMeo crime family of North Jersey. The character was created by Sopranos creator and showrunner David Chase, who was also largely responsible for the character's story arc throughout the series.

Gandolfini was cast in the role ahead of other actors, including Steven Van Zandt and Michael Rispoli. The character is loosely based on stories from and about an assortment of real-life Mafia figures, including New Jersey mobsters Ruggerio "Richie the Boot" Boiardo, boss of the Genovese crime family New Jersey faction, Vincent "Vinny Ocean" Palermo, a former caporegime and de facto boss of the DeCavalcante crime family and boss Sam DeCavalcante. Bobby Boriello and Mark Damiano II portrayed the character as a child in one episode each and Danny Petrillo played the character as a teenager in three episodes. William Ludwig portrayed him as a child and Gandolfini's son Michael portrayed him as a teenager in the 2021 prequel film The Many Saints of Newark.

In the first season, Tony is a capo and serves as a key ally for ailing acting boss Giacomo "Jackie" Aprile in the DiMeo family. Between the first and second seasons, he is promoted to acting underboss and then official underboss, a position he retains until the sixth season; his uncle Corrado "Junior" Soprano is the acting boss up until early in the sixth season, but actual power is retained by Tony. Throughout the series, Tony struggles to balance the conflicting needs of his family—wife Carmela, daughter Meadow, son A.J. and mother Livia—with those of the Mafia. He displays behavior traits characteristic of a violent sociopath, struggles with depression and is prone to panic attacks. From the pilot episode, he seeks treatment from Dr. Jennifer Melfi (a character Chase modeled after his own psychiatrist) and remains in therapy on and off until the penultimate episode of the series.

Both the character Tony Soprano, and Gandolfini's performance, have garnered universal critical acclaim and is often cited as one of the greatest and most influential characters in television history. For his portrayal of the character, Gandolfini won three Primetime Emmy Awards for Outstanding Lead Actor in a Drama Series, three Actor Awards for Outstanding Performance by a Male Actor in a Drama Series and a Golden Globe Award for Best Actor – Television Series Drama.

== Casting ==
James Gandolfini was invited to audition for the part of Tony Soprano after casting director Susan Fitzgerald saw a short clip of his performance in the 1993 film True Romance, ultimately receiving the role ahead of several other actors due to his physically large stature and acting abilities.

Anthony LaPaglia was initially interested in the role but, due to a Broadway production and the decision not to go with Fox, he was not considered further. Series creator David Chase invited Steven Van Zandt, a guitarist in Bruce Springsteen's E Street Band, to audition for the role of Tony. Van Zandt, who had never acted before, felt that the role should go to an experienced actor, so Chase wrote him into a part that did not exist—as Silvio Dante. Michael Rispoli, who eventually played Jackie Aprile, was also very close to being cast as Tony.

In the pilot, Tony was named Tommy—an homage to the character played by James Cagney in The Public Enemy, Tom Powers, but the clearance on naming the character Tom was never given. The name "Tony Soprano" came from a family friend of Chase's named Toby Soprano.

As methods to focus anger into his performances, Gandolfini said he would deliberately hit himself on the head, stay up all night to evoke the desired reaction, drink several cups of coffee or walk around with a rock in his shoe.

== Fictional character biography ==
=== Early life ===
Tony Soprano was born in 1959 (1955 in The Many Saints of Newark), the second child and only son of Livia and Johnny Soprano. His father was a caporegime in the DiMeo crime family. Tony grew up living with his parents and two sisters, Janice and Barbara, in the old First Ward neighborhood of Newark, New Jersey. Tony's paternal grandfather, Corrado Soprano, was from Avellino, a city in the Campania region of Southern Italy, and immigrated to the United States in 1911. He was a master stonemason who helped to build a church in Tony's old neighborhood.

In adulthood, Tony recalls how Johnny used Janice as a cover for attending meetings with criminal associates at a children's amusement park, leading him to assume she was his father's favorite child. In therapy, when asked to remember happy childhood memories about his mother, Tony struggles to come up with any; he later describes his mother as a cruel, joyless woman who wore his father down "to a little nub" and who seemed to delight in threatening her children.

Tony has a troubled relationship with Janice, due to her flighty and impulsive nature, which leads to her constantly relying on him for financial and emotional support. Their bond is further complicated in adulthood when she murders her boyfriend, Richie Aprile, one of Tony's subordinates, for striking her during a domestic dispute, leading to her calling on Tony for assistance in disposing of his body.

In high school, Tony met his future wife, Carmela DeAngelis, and became friends with Artie Bucco and Davey Scatino. He was also close to his maternal cousin Tony Blundetto. Their mutual relatives called them Tony-Uncle-Al and Tony-Uncle-Johnny (after their fathers) to tell them apart, although Tony Soprano and his friends would take to calling Blundetto "Tony B". The two Tonys spent summers at the farm of their uncle Pat Blundetto, a former DiMeo soldier allowed to retire from the Mafia due to chronic illness.

When they were in their early twenties, Tony Blundetto was arrested for his part in a hijacking; Tony Soprano was supposed to join him on the job but failed to appear because of a panic attack after an argument with his mother, which resulted in his blacking out and suffering a head injury. For years after, Tony Soprano claimed that he had sustained the injury during a mugging, a story he maintained to allay his guilt. As a young adult, he attended Seton Hall University for a semester and a half before dropping out to pursue a life of crime.

Tony was part of an unofficial crew of young criminals consisting of childhood friends Silvio Dante and Giacomo "Jackie" Aprile, Sr. He and Jackie gained notoriety in the DiMeo family by robbing a card game run by Feech La Manna. Under the tutelage of his father's friend Paulie "Walnuts" Gualtieri, Tony committed his first murder in 1982, killing a small-time bookie named Willie Overall. Following the murder, Paulie became Tony's mentor in the Mafia, with Paulie eventually settling into a role as Tony's own capo.

Johnny shepherded Tony through his ascendancy until his death in 1986 from emphysema. When he died, Johnny had risen to the level of capo of his crew, as had his older brother, Junior. Junior took over as Tony's mentor, with parental figures Paulie and Salvatore "Big Pussy" Bonpensiero passing their loyalty to Tony upon his father's death, while Silvio joined the crew. Tony became acting capo of his father's old crew, a position which eventually became permanent.

In 1995, Jackie became acting boss after Ercole "Eckley" DiMeo was sent to prison. The family was prosperous under Jackie's rule until 1998 when he was diagnosed with intestinal cancer. With Jackie's death in mid-1998, a succession crisis between Tony and Junior reached a point where a war within the family appeared imminent. However, Tony brought a quick end to the conflict by endorsing Junior as the official boss of the family. Unbeknownst to Junior, Tony secretly struck a deal with the rest of the family to be the true boss, allowing Junior to believe that he is in power and act as a distraction for the FBI.

=== Narrated killings committed by Tony Soprano ===
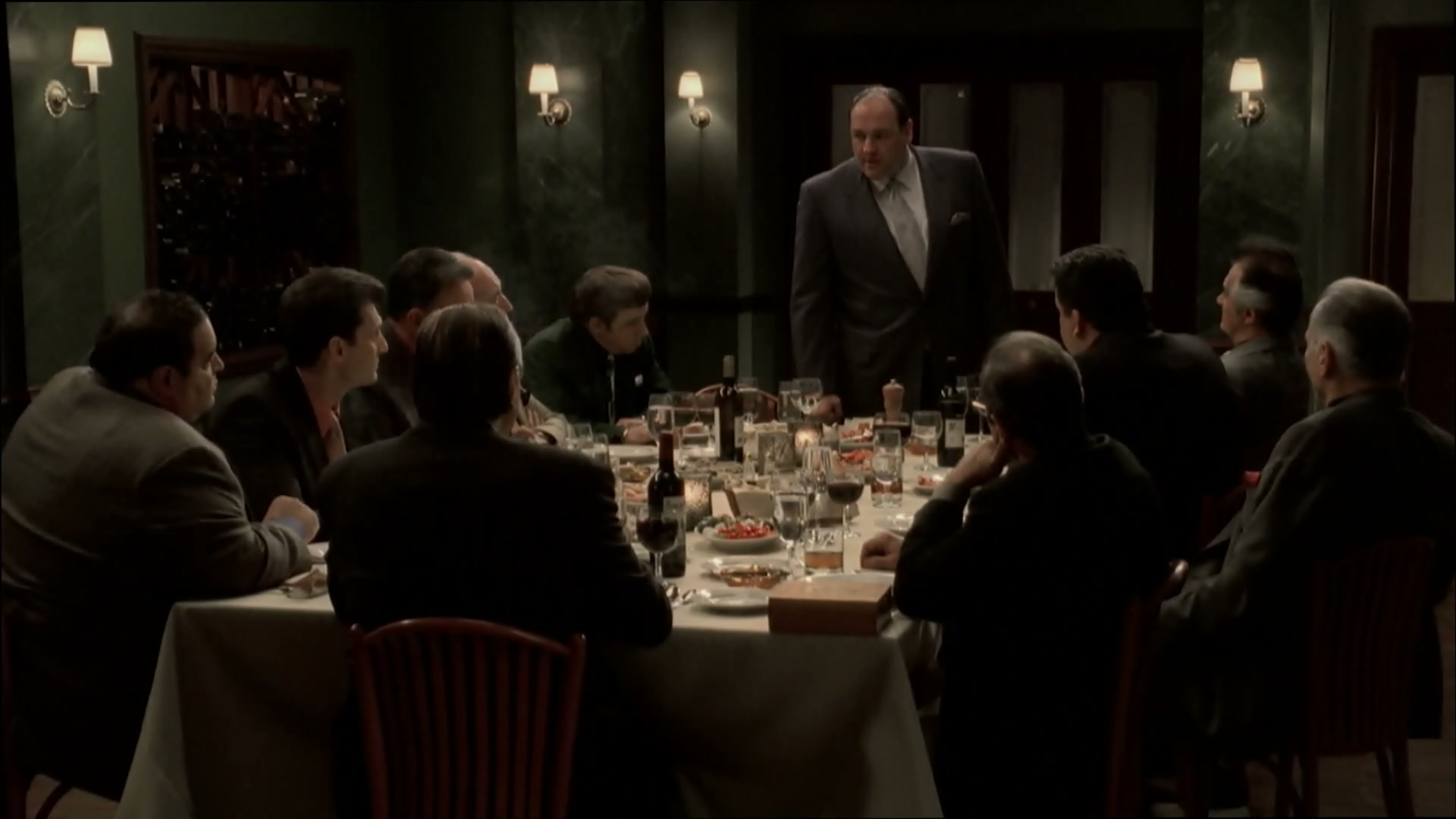
Tony Soprano presiding over the DiMeo crime family in "All Due Respect"

Tony personally committed eight murders during the show. As a boss, he was responsible for the deaths of others killed on his orders. The eight known murders, all explicitly presented onscreen, were:

Victim
Victim	Year	Reason	Episode
Willie Overall	1982	shot and killed by Tony to "make his bones" (become a made man).	Remember When
Fabian "Febby" Petrulio	1999	strangled by Tony for ratting out members of Paulie and Pussy's crew and joining the witness protection program.	College
Chucky Signore	1999	shot and killed by Tony for conspiring with Junior to kill him.	I Dream of Jeannie Cusamano
Matthew Bevilaqua	2000	killed by Tony and Big Pussy for attempting to kill Christopher Moltisanti.	From Where to Eternity
Salvatore "Big Pussy" Bonpensiero	2000	executed by Tony, Silvio, and Paulie on a yacht, after they discovered that he was an FBI informant.	Funhouse
Ralph Cifaretto	2002	choked/bludgeoned to death in a fight over Ralph's supposedly killing their prize-winning racehorse "Pie-O-My" for insurance money.	Whoever Did This
Tony Blundetto	2004	Shot and killed by Tony with a shotgun for the unauthorized killings of Joe Peeps and Billy Leotardo, to spare him from being the subject of torture from Phil Leotardo in revenge for his brother's death, as well as spare his crew from the threat of retaliation.	All Due Respect
Christopher Moltisanti	2007	Suffocated by Tony, following a major car accident with Christopher as the driver and Tony as the passenger, Christopher revealed that he was still using drugs and was worried about going to the hospital.	Kennedy and Heidi

=== As a father ===
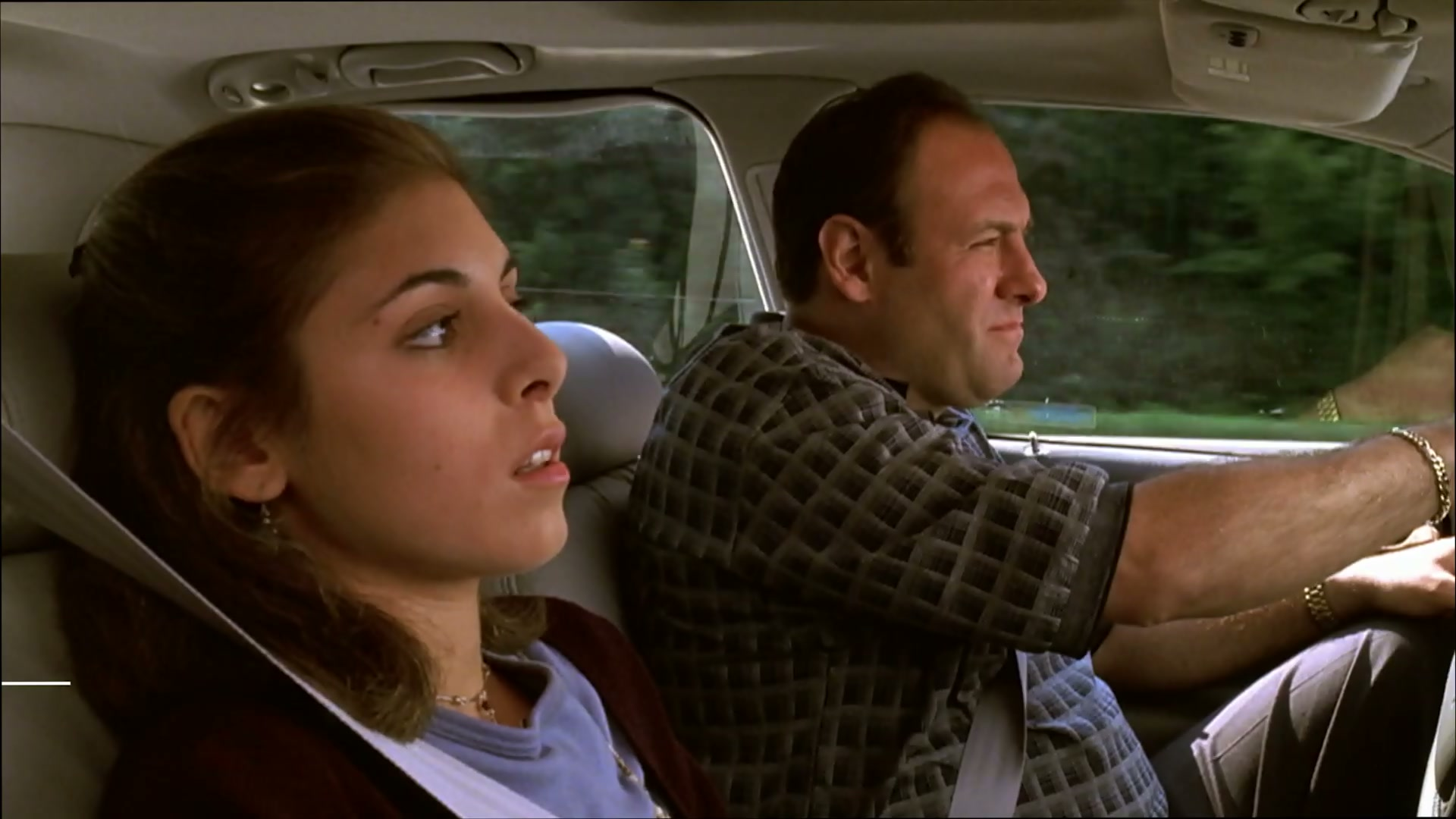
Tony with his daughter Meadow

Tony lives in North Caldwell, New Jersey with his wife and two children: Meadow Soprano and Anthony (A.J.) Soprano. He also treats Christopher Moltisanti, his wife's first cousin once removed, as a son in many ways.

Tony is often portrayed as a loving father—he attends his children's sporting events regularly and does all he can to ensure they have luxuries and opportunities. He hopes that both his children will escape the life of crime he has led. Tony takes great pride in Meadow's achievements. In Season 1, he is moved to tears by her performance at a choir recital. He often tells people about her aspiration to become a pediatrician.

He also sometimes alienates his children with his behavior. He has always tried to conceal his criminal life from them—something that Meadow saw through early on and A.J. also realizes with guidance from his sister.

Tony's over-protectiveness of Meadow leads to feuds between them on several occasions. For example, her first boyfriend at college, Noah Tannenbaum, is of black and Jewish ancestry and Tony's dislike of him leads him to try to drive him away. Meadow learns of her father's actions and does not speak to him for several months, eventually reconciling at Christmas in 2001.

Meadow's next boyfriend is Jackie Aprile Jr., the son of Tony's old friend, the late Jackie Aprile Sr. Tony had promised Jackie Jr.'s father that he would keep his son out of the Mafia life. Tony is initially pleased with the relationship, believing Jackie to be a hard-working pre-med student from a good family. However, since Jackie's uncle Richie Aprile's release from prison and subsequent death, Tony realizes that Jackie had become more involved in the Mafia when he sees him at strip clubs and a casino.

He eventually beats Jackie up to warn him about abusing his daughter's feelings and confiscates his gun. Tony begins seeing much of himself and his treatment of Carmela in Jackie's relationship with Meadow. Jackie is killed by Vito for his involvement in a robbery at Christopher's and Furio's executive card game, and for shooting a made man, Furio. This drives Meadow to drink and into depression, although they had broken up shortly before his death.

After Jackie's death, Tony accepts Meadow's college friends and gets along well with her fiancé, Finn, before the two separate under unrevealed circumstances.

When Meadow is out for dinner with her "mystery" boyfriend Patrick Parisi, New York mob member Salvatore "Coco" Cogliano walks up to the table and makes remarks about her looks and how "Tony must love tucking you in at night". After taking advice from her mother, Meadow tells Tony, who hides his rage and says Coco is "harmless" and "an idiot". Tony then tracks down Coco and Butch DeConcini at John's Restaurant on East 12th Street in Manhattan. Tony viciously pistol-whips Coco several times with a snubnosed revolver and warns Butch at gunpoint to shut up and remain seated at his table. After breaking off some of Coco's teeth with a curb stomp, Tony leaves the restaurant.

Tony's feelings toward his son are mixed; he worries about his future. From the beginning, Tony has doubts that his son could succeed in the Mafia, telling his therapist, Dr. Melfi that "he'd never make it". His fears are confirmed as A.J. consistently demonstrates throughout the series that he lacks his father's cunning and dominating persona. Tony tells A.J. numerous times that he is proud that his son is gentle and kind. Tony is especially proud of A.J.'s prowess on the football field, even amid his failing grades in high school, but is frustrated with A.J.'s lack of focus after graduation.

After flunking out of Ramapo State, A.J. loafs around the house, parties, and for a time holds a job at Blockbuster until his father gets him a job working construction. There, A.J. meets Blanca, and in Tony's opinion, A.J. does well until he and Blanca break up. Tony worries about A.J.'s depression, the "rotten putrid Soprano gene" that Tony believes he passed down to his son.

Hoping to get A.J. back on track, Tony rekindles A.J.'s friendship with "the Jasons", sons of two of his associates, and A.J. seems to be doing better. With the help of a therapist and medication, A.J. is finally getting back to college, this time at Rutgers University, to take classes and party with girls as Tony believes every college kid should. This later turns sour after A.J. sees his new friends attack a Somali student on a bike and he regresses into depression.

A.J. tries to drown himself in a swimming pool but decides he wants to live; he is unable to escape the pool, however. Tony hears his cries for help and rescues him. After A.J. is released from a mental health ward, Tony and Carmela dissuade him from joining the Army and persuade him instead to become involved in a film bankrolled by Carmine Lupertazzi Jr., with the possibility of opening a club.

=== Interests and hobbies ===
Tony is an animal lover and enjoys feeding the ducks that visit his pool. He has a sentimental attachment towards animals, as he had been traumatized by the loss of his childhood dog (as revealed in the episode "In Camelot"), whose name was "Tippy". When he goes to confront Angie Bonpensiero as she is walking her poodle, the dog greets Tony in a friendly manner, which Tony reciprocates. During Christopher Moltisanti's intervention, when Tony hears Christopher accidentally suffocated Adrianna's dog, he is furious, saying, "I oughta suffocate you, you little prick!".

He becomes involved in horse racing through his friend Hesh Rabkin, who owns a stable, and invests in a racehorse named Pie-O-My. When his horse is killed in a fire – possibly set by Ralph Cifaretto – Tony is deeply upset and saddened and kills Cifaretto, yelling: "She was a beautiful innocent creature. What did she ever do to you?" He repeats "You fucking killed her!", while banging Cifaretto's head against the floor.

When informed by Carmela that a black bear has been foraging in his home's backyard while they were separated during Season 5, he reacts with interest, rather than fear. During his stay in the hospital after his shooting, he can be seen reading a book about dinosaurs, given by Carmela. In the series finale, Tony finds a stray cat at his safe house during the war with New York and takes a liking to it. He brings it back to Satriale's, where it stares at the deceased Chris Moltisanti's photo (much to Paulie's dismay).

Tony is seen many times throughout the show engaging in both freshwater and saltwater angling. His son Anthony Jr. sometimes accompanies him on fishing outings. During the second season, he presents his son with a Fenwick rod and a Penn International reel, both extremely high-quality products. In the sixth season, while in Florida with Paulie, he rents a sport fishing boat. He is sometimes haunted by visions of Pussy Bonpensiero incarnated in the form of a fish – presumably a reference to the disposal of his body in the ocean, or perhaps a reference to "sleeping with the fishes," from Godfather I. A Big Mouth Billy Bass novelty singing fish, brought into the Bada Bing by Georgie and another later presented to him as a Christmas present by his daughter Meadow, recalls his nightmare and disturbs him greatly.

Throughout the series, Tony is shown to be a frequent cigar smoker, as well as an occasional cigarette smoker. He can be seen smoking a cigar during important events, such as shortly before being told of his mother's death and when disposing of Ralph Cifaretto's corpse. In the Season 1 episode "A Hit Is a Hit", he gives his doctor and next-door neighbor Bruce Cusamano a box of Cuban cigars as a thank-you gift for referring him to Dr. Melfi.

He is a gun enthusiast and is shown to have an arsenal in his home. He gives guns as birthday gifts to his father-in-law Hugh DeAngelis (in "Marco Polo") and receives one from Bobby Baccialieri on his birthday (in "Soprano Home Movies").

Tony enjoys sports, particularly baseball, football, basketball, golf, and horse racing. He played baseball and football at West Essex High School, and is a fan of the New York Yankees and New York Jets. He has taken A.J. to New Jersey Nets and New Jersey Devils games occasionally throughout the series. Some objects and posters in A.J.'s room confirm this. He plays golf with Johnny Sack at Upper Montclair Country Club. A large portion of his income is derived from illegal sports betting.

Tony is an amateur yachtsman and has owned two motor yachts throughout the show: Stugots and Stugots II, where several of his affairs take place. The name comes from the Italian phrase sto cazzo, literally meaning "this dick" or "my dick", and depending on the context, "what the fuck" or "my ass".

Tony maintains an avid interest in history, particularly World War II. Throughout seasons 4 and 5, Tony is seen watching Vietnam War documentaries. He is a big fan of President John F. Kennedy and owns one of his captain sailor hats, which he won at an auction. He is often shown watching programs on the History Channel about leaders such as George S. Patton, Erwin Rommel, and Winston Churchill. He reads The Art of War by Sun Tzu, which is quoted by several other characters on the show, particularly Paulie Walnuts.

Tony is often seen watching classic mob films. For example, he is shown watching The Public Enemy (1931) throughout the episode "Proshai, Livushka", which addresses his mother's death. He also shares a love for The Godfather series, wondering what went wrong in the third installment, although he and his friends are highly entertained when Silvio does an impression of Al Pacino from it.

Tony listens to classic, progressive rock and pop music, particularly of the 1960s and 1970s. Over the course of the show he is seen to enjoy AC/DC, Deep Purple, Eagles, Eric Clapton, Jefferson Airplane, Jethro Tull, Journey, Lynyrd Skynyrd, Pink Floyd, Rush, Steely Dan, The Clash, The Chi-Lites, Tom Petty and The Heartbreakers, and Van Morrison.

Despite remarking about the dangers of drug use to his children and some of his fellow mobsters, Tony engages in recreational use multiple times in the latter half of the series, doing lines of cocaine with Adriana, and smoking marijuana and using peyote on a trip to Las Vegas.

=== Vehicles ===
Like most of the mobsters in the series, Tony is shown to be partial to Cadillac and Lincoln vehicles. When discussing with Dr. Melfi a bizarre dream in which his penis falls off, he mentions that he went to the guy who used to "work on my Lincoln when I drove Lincolns". For the first four seasons, Tony drives a burgundy 1999 Chevrolet Suburban LT 4x4.

In season 5 he drives a black Cadillac Escalade ESV. This black Escalade is totaled in an accident and quickly replaced with a white Escalade ESV. Tony has this Escalade until the end of the series. He has occasionally used Carmela's Mercedes-Benz E-Class station wagon and drove it when they went places together.

=== Extramarital affairs ===
Throughout the series, Tony is shown to be a serial adulterer. He typically has mistresses whom he consistently sees for long periods, though he also has several brief one-night stands with strippers from the Bada Bing.

His wife Carmela is tacitly aware of his infidelity and usually views it as a form of masturbation, though sometimes the bottled-up tensions explode in domestic arguments. At the end of Season 4, Irina telephones Carmela in a jealous rage at Tony's cheating on her with her cousin Svetlana, which causes Carmela to finally snap. Carmela throws Tony out of the house and begins divorce proceedings.

Tony has a strong preference for women of European, particularly Italian descent, with dark hair and eyes. His mistresses have been, in chronological order, of Russian (Irina and later Svetlana), Italian (Gloria Trillo), Italian-Cuban (Valentina La Paz), and Jewish descent (Julianna Skiff). He favors dark features but also has a few brief flings with blonde American European women, including a stewardess from Icelandic Airways and a medical assistant. He has one very short encounter with an Asian-American escort during "The Test Dream".

Mistresses:

- Irina Peltsin – a young Russian woman whom he sees consistently throughout the first two seasons. She frequently calls Tony's house when drunk, and when Carmela hints that she knows that he is seeing her, he breaks off the relationship. After her suicide attempt, Tony sends Silvio to give her a monetary compensation of $75,000 and try to reason with her about moving on with her life.
- Gloria Trillo – an Italian-American Mercedes-Benz saleswoman with stylish tastes. Tony dates her throughout Season 3 after meeting her at Dr. Melfi's office (Melfi repeatedly expresses her disapproval of their relationship, knowing it will likely turn out a disaster). He eventually stops seeing her when she begins stalking him and calling his house while exhibiting manipulative behaviors reminding him of his own mother (which is foreshadowed very early on when she teases him by saying "poor you", jokingly at first). He also understands through Dr. Melfi's hints that Gloria is trying to use him as a means to commit suicide (akin to the suicide by cop phenomenon). Tony asks Patsy Parisi to threaten her; Parisi tells her that, if she tries again to harass Tony, the last face she'll see will be his, not Tony's, and that "it won't be cinematic". It turns out that it throws her over the edge and she commits suicide soon afterward, hanging herself. This greatly upsets Tony, who blames it on himself as well as Dr. Melfi.
- Valentina La Paz – a beautiful art dealer of Italian and Cuban descent, initially the mistress of Ralph Cifaretto. Tony dates her throughout Season 4. They share a love of horses, and she visits Pie-O-My at the stable with Tony. She accidentally sets her robe on fire in Season 5 while cooking eggs for Tony. Shortly thereafter he decides to get back together with Carmela, and he breaks up with Valentina while she is in the hospital recovering from second-degree burns to her head, face, and arm. Tony offers to take care of any cost related to her treatment, but their relationship ends on bad terms.
- Svetlana Kirilenko – the cousin of Tony's ex- mistress Irina and the manager of a home care nursing business. During her childhood, Svetlana developed osteosarcoma in her leg, which was amputated soon afterward. Tony comments that she looks like the actress Greta Garbo. She was first hired as Livia Soprano's nurse since Janice had left town. Svetlana resurfaces as Uncle Junior's nurse after he suffers a fall at the courthouse. One afternoon while Uncle Junior is asleep, Tony has sex with Svetlana on Junior's sofa but they are caught by Junior's nurse, Branca. Irina soon finds out about this and informs Carmela about the affair, prompting Carmela's violent confrontation of Tony and their ultimate separation. Svetlana later tells Tony that Branca told Irina about their affair after an argument over Svetlana's withholding FICA and other taxes from her paycheck. Tony admires Svetlana for her toughness of spirit and her refusal to allow her disability and misfortune to get in the way of her ambitions. Arguably, Svetlana is the most psychologically balanced of all Tony's extramarital affairs.
- Julianna Skiff – a real estate developer of Jewish descent. She meets Tony in Season 6 when offering to buy a building that he owns, to be converted into a Jamba Juice. They later begin an affair, along with a business relationship, but never consummate their relationship sexually; Tony backs off and decides to be faithful to Carmela, who stuck with him after the shooting and seems re-devoted to him. Julianna eventually dates Christopher Moltisanti and the two begin a very destructive, co-dependent drug habit; she is last seen attending Christopher's funeral service, where she mentions that they had split up.

=== Therapy ===
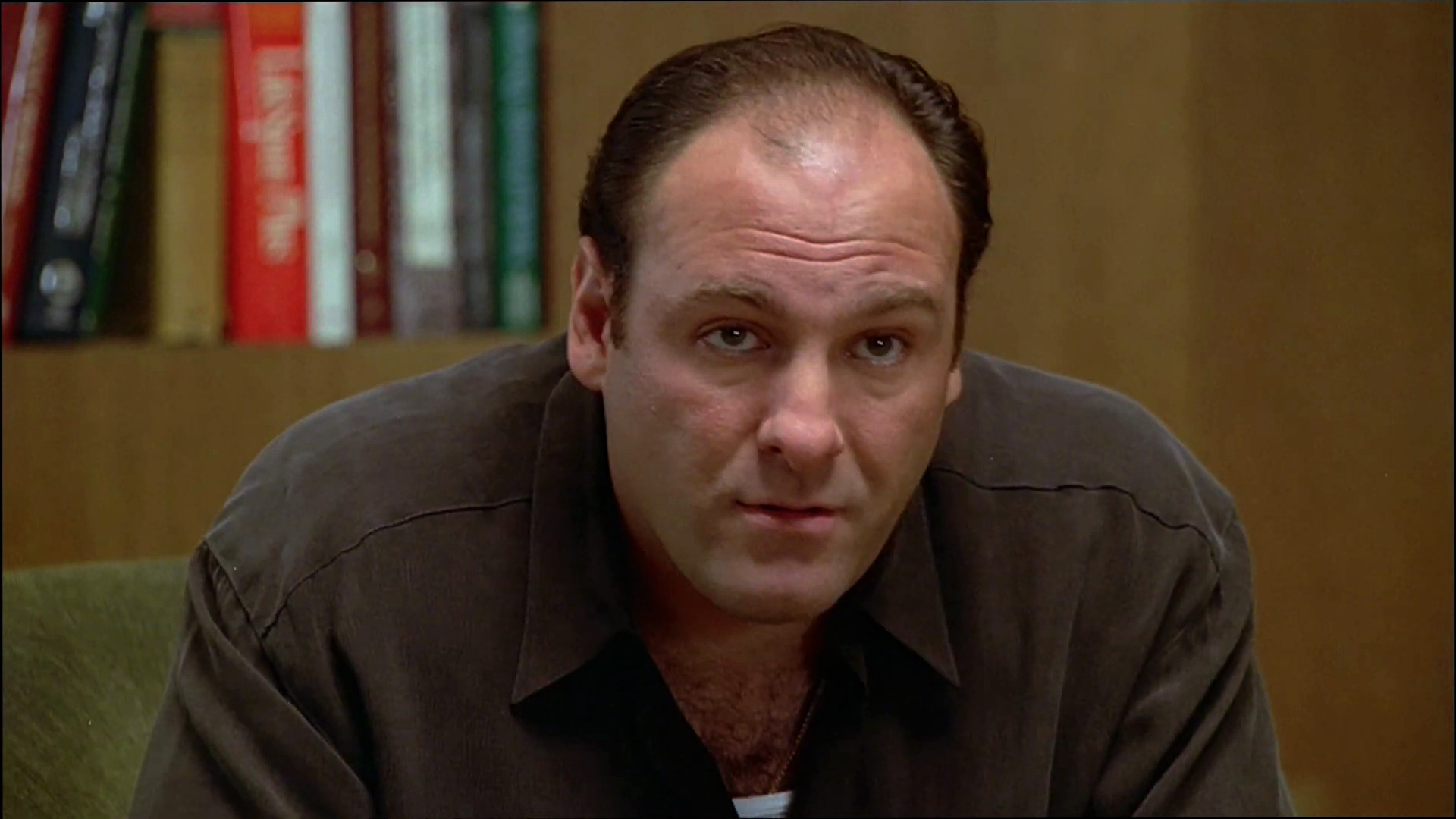
Tony during a therapy session

Tony has suffered from panic attacks that sometimes cause him to lose consciousness since his childhood. He has his first on-screen panic attack while cooking sausages at his son's birthday party—this occurs in a flashback in the pilot episode. Tony loses consciousness and causes a small explosion when he drops a bottle of lighter fluid onto the coals. Tony describes the experience of the panic attack as feeling like he had "ginger ale in his skull". This prompts him to seek help for the attacks. After extensive testing that includes an MRI scan and blood work, no physical cause can be found, so Dr. Cusamano refers Tony to psychiatrist Dr. Jennifer Melfi.

Tony's therapy allows a discussion of his thoughts and feelings away from both aspects of his life—this forum for reaching into the character's thoughts has been described as a Greek chorus, and as a key for viewers to understand the character.

Tony is initially very resistant to the idea that there was a psychiatric cause for his symptoms. He resents being in therapy and refuses to accept the diagnosis of panic attacks given him by the neurologists who had investigated his illness. Tony begins to open up once Dr. Melfi explains the doctor-patient confidentiality rules. He tells her about the stress of his business life—he has a feeling that he has come in at the end of something and describes a reverence for the glorified "old days" of the Mafia. Tony leaves out the violence associated with his criminal career. Tony tells Dr. Melfi a story about ducks landing in his pool. He describes his mother Livia as a cold, mean-spirited woman with whom he has an openly hostile relationship. By the end of the first session Tony has admitted that he feels depressed, but storms out when Dr. Melfi presses him further about the relationship between his symptoms and the ducks.

When the family visits Green Grove, a retirement community where Tony is trying to place his mother, Livia's derisive outburst prompts a second panic attack. Melfi prescribes Prozac as an anti-depressant, telling him that no one needs to have depression with the wonders of modern pharmacology. Tony fails to attend their next scheduled session.

At their next session, Tony is still reluctant to face his psychological weaknesses. Tony is quick to credit the medication for his improved mood, but Dr. Melfi tells him it cannot be that, as it takes six weeks to work—she credits their therapy sessions. Tony describes a dream where a bird steals his penis. Melfi extrapolates that Tony has projected his love for his family onto the family of ducks living in his pool. This brings him to tears, to his consternation. She tells him that their flight from the pool sparked his panic attack through the overwhelming fear of somehow losing his own family.

In the episode "46 Long", they continue discussing Tony's mother and her difficulties living alone. Tony admits that he feels guilty because his mother could not be allowed to live with his family. We learn that he has been left to care for his mother alone by his sisters. When Dr. Melfi asks him to remember good experiences from his childhood, he has difficulty. He blames Carmela for preventing his mother from living with them. Later they discuss Livia's car accident, and Melfi suggests depression may have contributed to the accident – Tony misunderstands her and becomes angry. Tony has a panic attack while visiting his mother's home after she moves to Green Grove. In a later session, Dr. Melfi pushes Tony to admit he has feelings of anger towards his mother, and he again storms out. During this episode, Tony introduces the concept of him acting like the sad clown – happy on the outside but sad on the inside.

In "Denial, Anger, Acceptance", Tony discusses Jackie's cancer with Dr. Melfi. She tries to use it as an example of Tony's negative thinking contributing to his depression. Tony becomes angry and storms out. He feels she is trying to trick him and manipulate his thoughts using the pictures that decorate her office. After Jackie worsens and Tony is called a "Frankenstein" by a business associate, he returns to therapy to discuss these things with Dr. Melfi. She asks him if he feels like a monster.

In "Fortunate Son", Tony discusses a childhood memory of an early panic attack. He saw his father and uncle mutilate Mr. Satriale, the local butcher, and later fainted at a family dinner made with free meat from Satriale's shop. Dr. Melfi makes a connection between meat and Tony's panic attacks.

Later Dr. Melfi tries prescribing lithium as a mood stabilizer. In the episode "Isabella", Tony sinks into a severe depressive episode and experiences hallucinations—he sees a beautiful Italian woman named Isabella in his neighbor's garden. Tony sees Isabella several times during the episode and later learns that she never existed. Melfi theorizes that Isabella was an idealized maternal figure that Tony's subconscious produced because he was deeply upset about his own mother's actions at the time.

In "I Dream of Jeannie Cusamano", Tony abruptly ends his therapy and persuades Dr. Melfi to go into hiding when he discovers that Uncle Junior has found out about their sessions.

The relationship between Tony and Dr. Melfi is up-and-down, with Tony reaching a level of comfort with Dr. Melfi that he has never experienced with anyone else before, not even his wife. This closeness leads Tony to have something of a "crush" on Dr. Melfi, something that is unattainable. However, the "prying" from Dr. Melfi is uncomfortable for Tony and he often turns sarcastic and antagonistic towards her, leading to an ongoing strain in their relationship. In the episode when Tony's sister, Janice, goes back to Seattle, it is revealed during a rushed conversation between Janice and Tony that their mother has narcissistic personality disorder.

During the episode "The Second Coming", aired in part II of season six, Melfi's therapist suggests to her that her work with Tony could be considered enabling toward Tony's sociopathic tendencies. Finally, in the penultimate episode of the series, "The Blue Comet", Melfi severs her relationship with Tony after reading research recommended by her therapist that indicates sociopaths can use talk therapy to improve their skills in manipulating others and use what is learned in therapy to become more capable criminals.

=== Shootings ===
In the first season, Tony is attacked by William Johnson "Petite" Clayborn and Rasheen Ray, two hitmen sent by Donnie Paduana to execute Tony. Tony sustains an injury to his ear, which is partially shot off, and minor bruises and cuts from crashing his vehicle. One of the two assailants, Clayborn, is shot dead by Ray in an attempt to kill Tony, and Ray is left bruised but runs off.

In the premiere of the sixth season, "Members Only", Junior Soprano, suffering from dementia, believes Tony to be Gennaro "Little Pussy" Malanga, and shoots him in the abdomen. Tony dials 911 but loses consciousness before being able to tell the operator what happened.

In the second episode of the sixth season, "Join the Club", Tony is in a medically induced coma in the hospital. In the second and third episodes, the viewer sees Tony in a dream-like state, eventually arriving at what could be purgatory, where he is greeted by a man who takes the physical form of his late cousin Tony Blundetto. The shadowy figure in the doorway of the house has the profile of his mother, who is dead. The voice of a younger version of his daughter calls him back. At the end of the third episode, he awakes from his coma in a confused but stable state.

By the fourth episode, Tony is mobile and fully aware and has regained his voice. Tony's attitude toward life is changed by his near-death experience. He has yet to discuss his experiences while unconscious with anyone close to him. However, in the Season 6 episode "Kaisha", he admits to Phil Leotardo (who had just suffered a heart attack), that while he was in a coma, he went to a place where he never wants to go again. While talking philosophy with John Schwinn, another patient at the hospital, he mentions that while in the coma he had the experience of being drawn towards somewhere he did not want to go and narrowly avoided it.

In the sixth episode of season 6, part 2, "Kennedy and Heidi", Tony sustains minor injuries in a car accident that seriously injures his nephew, Christopher Moltisanti. Tony suffocates Christopher after this accident. Tony is on bed rest for a few days and quickly recovers. Nonetheless, this gives his family quite a scare and a painful memory of his nearly fatal shooting the previous year.

=== Dreams ===
Tony sometimes has vivid dreams that are shown to the viewer. Episodes with dream sequences include "Pax Soprana", "Isabella", "Funhouse", "Everybody Hurts", "Calling All Cars", and "The Test Dream".

In the pilot, Tony tells Dr. Melfi about a dream he had wherein he had a screw in his belly button, which when removed, causes his penis to fall off. He tries to find a car mechanic (who had worked on his Lincoln when Tony drove Lincolns) to put it back on, but a duck swoops down and snatches it from his hand.

In "Meadowlands", Tony has a dream that several people in his life are present in Dr. Melfi's office: Hesh Rabkin strolling by the window, A.J. behind the door, Silvio Dante having sex with a woman in the waiting room, and Paulie Walnuts and Big Pussy reading Chinese newspapers. This causes him to worry that people will find out he is seeing a psychiatrist. The dream ends with Tony confronting Melfi, seeing Jackie Aprile, Sr. on his deathbed smoking a cigarette, asking Tony, "You smell that? That's rain," and only to find out that Melfi is his mother, Livia.

In "Pax Soprana", Tony has several dreams and fantasies about Dr. Melfi. He becomes convinced that he is in love with her, but she turns him down when he makes advances toward her.

In "Isabella", Tony, suffering from depression after Big Pussy disappears, acquaints himself with a dental student named Isabella who is staying in the Cusamano home while they are on vacation. He later discovers that he had hallucinated Isabella due to taking too much lithium and that Isabella represented the mother he never had.

In "Funhouse", an extended dream sequence exposes many of Tony's subconscious thoughts and feelings through symbolic and sometimes bizarre events: he attempts suicide to preempt a doctor's diagnosis of early death by dousing himself in gasoline and lighting himself on fire; he witnesses himself shooting Paulie Walnuts to death during a card game; he has an innuendo-laden conversation with Dr. Melfi while sporting a prominent erection, and a fish that speaks with the voice of Big Pussy confirms his suspicions that the longtime friend and soldier is a federal informant.

In "Everybody Hurts", Tony dreams of his ex-mistress Gloria Trillo shortly after learning of her suicide by hanging. He visits her apartment and finds her in a black dress with a black scarf around her neck. She is cooking dinner, and when she goes over to the oven the scarf drapes across Tony. Plaster falls in front of Tony and when he looks up, he sees that the chandelier is almost pulled out of the ceiling. Gloria is suddenly back at the table and offers Tony a choice between seeing what she has under her dress or her scarf. As she begins to peel away the scarf, Tony wakes up and makes his way to the bathroom for some medication.

In "Calling All Cars", Tony has two dreams featuring Ralph Cifaretto. In the first, he is being driven by Carmela in the back of his father's old car while Ralph sits in the passenger seat. A caterpillar is crawling on the back of Ralph's head. Tony's fellow passenger in the back seat changes; Gloria Trillo and Svetlana Kirilenko are both seen. The caterpillar turns into a butterfly. Dr. Melfi later tells him that the dream signifies a change for Ralph (recently killed by Tony) and Carmela being in control, which Tony doesn't like.

In the second dream, Tony follows Ralph to an old house, which Ralph enters. Tony is dressed in trousers, suspenders, and an undershirt. He knocks on the door and a female figure descends slowly in shadow; the door creaks ominously. Tony says he is there for the stonemason job but does not speak English well (Tony's grandfather was an immigrant stonemason). Just as Tony is about to enter the house, he wakes up.

In "The Test Dream", Tony comes to terms with having to kill his cousin Tony Blundetto. The episode reflects on his inner demons and fears, including his children's future, his relationship with his wife, his infidelities, deceased acquaintances—including some who have died by his hand or by his orders—his fate, and his relationship with his father. He is again shown in his father's old car, accompanied by a range of past associates.

In "Join the Club", a comatose Tony finds himself in an alternate universe where he is a law-abiding salesman on a business trip. Among other differences, his accent has changed and his hotel's bartender condescends to him (in sharp contrast to the bartender at The Bing, who is a recurring punching bag for Tony). Tony has mistakenly taken another man's briefcase—Kevin Finnerty's—along with all of his identification and work. The episode follows his attempts to discern his identity, recover his briefcase, and get back to his family.

In "Kennedy and Heidi", a stressed Tony Soprano has a dream following the death of Christopher Moltisanti. In this dream, he tells his therapist that Christopher was a burden and that he is relieved that he was dead. After that, he also tells her that he murdered Big Pussy and his cousin Tony Blundetto. Following the dream, he acts differently to his friends and family, trying to see if they also feel relieved now that Christopher is dead.

== Legacy and cultural impact ==
The character of Tony Soprano popularized the "antihero" character on television after the release of The Sopranos. Playwright Craig Wright stated, "A show like The Sopranos has a soothing quality because ultimately there's an unspoken assumption behind it that even the most monstrous people are haunted by the same concerns we're haunted by." Tony Soprano quickly became a pop culture icon during the show's run. In an article for the Los Angeles Times, Chris Lee referred to Tony Soprano as a "cultural sensation" who became the "unlikeliest of sex symbols." On the importance of Gandolfini's performance, Lee stated: "He forever rejiggered television's fascination with morally challenged antiheroes and less-than-physically-perfect protagonists."

The Globe and Mail wrote, "Women made Tony Soprano an unlikely sex symbol – and the men found him no less seductive. Wish fulfillment has always been at the queasy heart of the mobster genre, the longing for a life outside the bounds of convention, mingled with the conflicted desire to see the perpetrator punished for the same transgression. So it was for the fictional men of the straight world on The Sopranos, who were drawn to Tony's flame with consistently disastrous results. Likewise for viewers, for whom a life of taking, killing, and sleeping with whomever and whatever one wants had an undeniable, if conflict-laden, appeal."

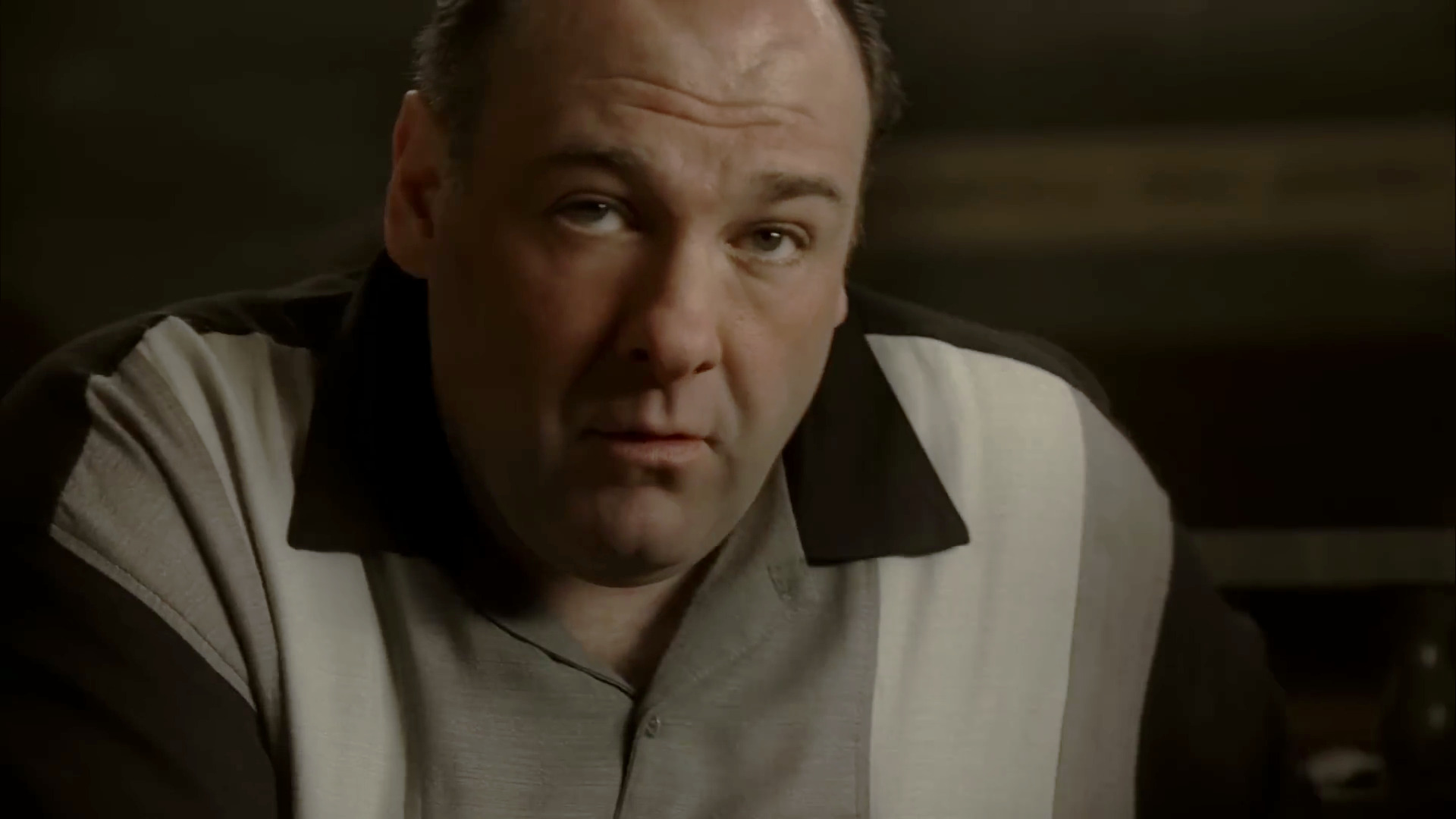
Tony in the series' final scene

The final scene of "Made in America" became the subject of much discussion, controversy, and analysis after its original broadcast; however, Chase consistently refused to give any definitive answers. The use of an abrupt cut to black followed by several seconds of silence led many viewers to initially believe that their cable or DVR had cut out at a crucial moment. Opposing interpretations soon emerged among viewers regarding the ultimate fate of Tony, with some believing that he was killed while others believed that he remained alive. During a November 2021 interview with Hollywood Reporter, Chase made comments which seemed to confirm Tony Soprano was killed at the end of the final episode.

Following Gandolfini's death on June 19, 2013, his portrayal of Tony Soprano was praised for its influence on subsequent other TV characters. TV Guide columnist Matt Roush stated, "Without Tony, there's no Vic Mackey of The Shield, no Al Swearengen of Deadwood, no Don Draper of Mad Men (whose creator, Matthew Weiner, honed his craft as a writer on The Sopranos)." Similar testimonials were included by his co-stars and colleagues; Bryan Cranston stated that his Breaking Bad character, Walter White, would not have existed without Tony Soprano. Mark Lawson of The Guardian praised Gandolfini for his "towering central performance" as Tony Soprano, writing: "The Sopranos was part of a wave of American TV dramas that finally persuaded cineastes and critics who had been snobbish and dismissive about television as a medium to accept the smaller screen as an artistic equivalent of the larger one. Although many of those who watched and wrote about TV had got this message much earlier, the remarkable and sustained range of Gandolfini's portrayal of Tony Soprano played a major part in ending any remaining inferiority complex about the medium."

Gandolfini's son Michael was cast in 2019 for the 2021 film The Many Saints of Newark to play a young Tony Soprano, as a prequel to the show. Michael, having never watched The Sopranos, watched through it to prepare for the role, describing it as an intense process.
