= List of awards and nominations received by The Sopranos =

List of awards and nominations for The Sopranos
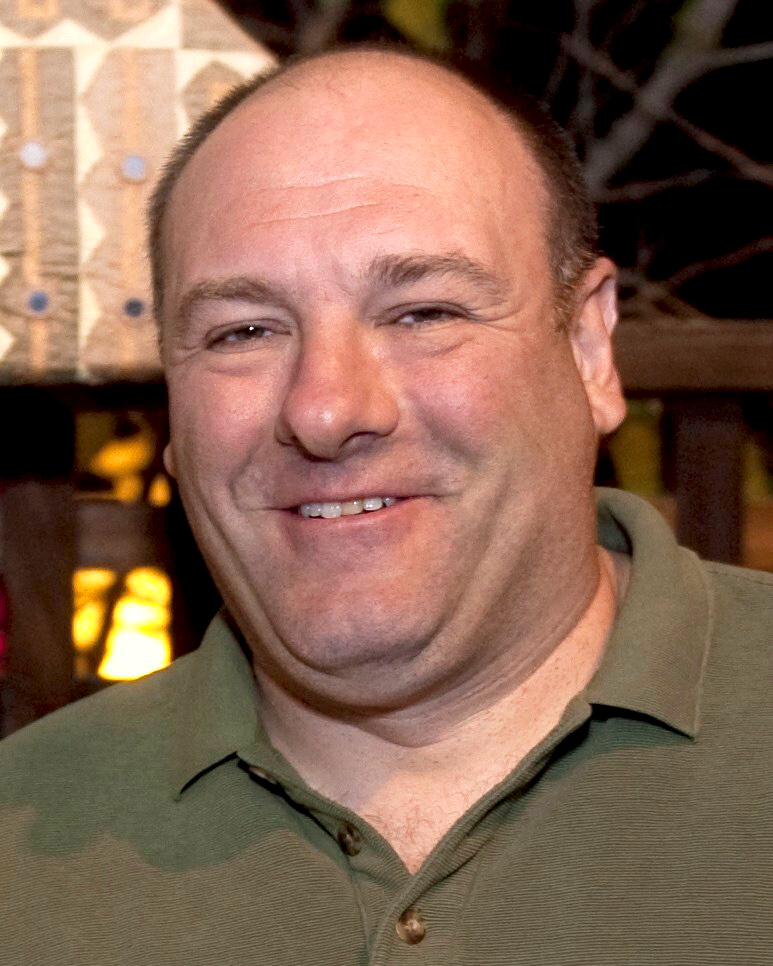
- James Gandolfini received numerous recognitions for his portrayal of series protagonist Tony Soprano.
Awards and nominations
Award	Wins	Nominations
ALMA Awards	0	2
American Cinema Editors Awards	3	7
American Film Institute Awards	6	6
American Society of Cinematographers Awards	0	1
Artios Awards	1	2
ASCAP Film and Television Music Awards	2	2
Banff Rockie Awards	3	4
BMI Film & TV Awards	3	3
Chris Awards	1	1
Cinema Audio Society Awards	1	6
Costume Designers Guild Awards	1	6
Directors Guild of America Awards	2	16
Edgar Awards	2	2
GLAAD Media Awards	0	1
Golden Globe Awards	5	23
Golden Reel Awards	2	6
Gracie Awards	1	1
Grammy Awards	0	2
Hollywood Post Alliance Awards	0	1
International Festival of Audiovisual Programs Awards	2	2
Make-Up Artists and Hair Stylists Guild Awards	0	1
NAACP Image Awards	0	1
Peabody Awards	2	2
PEN USA Literary Awards	1	1
People's Choice Awards	0	1
Primetime Emmy Awards	21	111
Prism Awards	0	2
Producers Guild of America Awards	3	6
Satellite Awards	1	10
Screen Actors Guild Awards	8	26
Television Critics Association Awards	12	24
TV Land Awards	0	2
Viewers for Quality Television Awards	0	6
Writers Guild of America Awards	4	11
Young Artist Awards	0	6
YoungStar Awards	4	4

Totals (Note: Certain award groups do not simply award one winner. They acknowledge several different recipients, have runners-up, and have third place. Since this is a specific recognition and is different from losing an award, runner-up mentions are considered wins in this award tally. For simplification and to avoid errors, each award in this list has been presumed to have had a prior nomination.)
- Wins: 91
- Nominations: 308

The Sopranos, an American crime drama television series created by David Chase that aired on the premium cable network HBO between 1999 and 2007, won and was nominated for a variety of different awards. The show won 21 Primetime Emmy Awards in 111 nominations. The series was nominated for the Primetime Emmy Award for Outstanding Drama Series seven times, in every year eligible, winning in 2004 (as the first series on a cable network to do so) and 2007. It also won five Golden Globe Awards in 23 nominations, including a win for Best Drama Series for its first season in 2000. The series was honored with two consecutive Peabody Awards in 2000 and 2001, and also won several major guild awards for its actors, directors, producers, and writers.

Additionally, because of the long hiatuses between certain seasons, the series was intermittently ineligible for awards.

Lead actor James Gandolfini and lead actress Edie Falco received the most nominations and wins of the ensemble cast, including three wins each for the Primetime Emmy Award, in their respective categories; as well as Falco winning the Golden Globe Award in 2000 and 2003, and Gandolfini winning in 2000. David Chase also received numerous accolades for his work on the series as a director, producer and writer, including the Primetime Emmy Award for Outstanding Writing for a Drama Series on three occasions. The Sopranos received 16 Directors Guild of America Award nominations, winning two of them; its four nominations in 2000 set a record for most nominations for a series in one category in a year. It received six Producers Guild of America Award nominations, winning three of them. At the Screen Actors Guild Awards, Gandolfini and Falco were honored three times each, and the entire cast also won for Outstanding Performance by an Ensemble in a Drama Series in 2000 and 2008. The show won four Writers Guild of America Awards from 11 nominations and 12 TCA Awards from 24 nominations. Its five nominations and four wins at the TCA Awards in 1999 set records for most nominations and wins in a year.

== Awards and nominations ==
Awards and nominations received by The Sopranos
Award	Year (Note: The listed year refers to the date of the ceremony, not necessarily the year in which the corresponding season or episode aired.)	Category	Nominee(s)	Result	Ref.
ALMA Awards	2001	Outstanding Actress in a Television Series	Jamie-Lynn Sigler	Nominated	
ALMA Awards	2002	Outstanding Actress in a Television Series	Jamie-Lynn Sigler	Nominated	
American Cinema Editors Awards	2000	Best Edited One-Hour Series for Television	William B. Stich (for "I Dream of Jeannie Cusamano")	Nominated	
American Cinema Editors Awards	2001	Best Edited One-Hour Series for Television	Sidney Wolinsky (for "Funhouse")	Nominated	
American Cinema Editors Awards	2002	Best Edited One-Hour Series for Television	Conrad Gonzalez (for "Pine Barrens")	Won	
American Cinema Editors Awards	2003	Best Edited One-Hour Series for Television	Sidney Wolinsky (for "Whitecaps")	Won	
American Cinema Editors Awards	2005	Best Edited One-Hour Series for Television	William B. Stich (for "Long Term Parking")	Nominated	
American Cinema Editors Awards	2007	Best Edited One-Hour Series for Non-Commercial Television	Sidney Wolinsky (for "Members Only")	Nominated	
American Cinema Editors Awards	2008	Best Edited One-Hour Series for Non-Commercial Television	Sidney Wolinsky (for "Made in America")	Won	
American Film Institute Awards	2001	Drama Series of the Year	The Sopranos	Won	
American Film Institute Awards	2001	Actor of the Year – Male – TV Series	James Gandolfini	Won	
American Film Institute Awards	2001	Actor of the Year – Female – TV Series	Edie Falco	Won	
American Film Institute Awards	2002	Television Programs of the Year	The Sopranos	Honored	
American Film Institute Awards	2004	Television Programs of the Year	The Sopranos	Honored	
American Film Institute Awards	2007	Television Programs of the Year	The Sopranos	Honored	
American Society of Cinematographers Awards	2005	Outstanding Achievement in Cinematography in Episodic Television	Alik Sakharov (for "Long Term Parking")	Nominated	
Artios Awards	2000	Outstanding Achievement in Dramatic Episodic Casting	Georgianne Walken and Sheila Jaffe	Won	
Artios Awards	2003	Outstanding Achievement in Dramatic Episodic Casting	Georgianne Walken and Sheila Jaffe	Nominated	
ASCAP Film and Television Music Awards	2004	Top Television Series	Jake Black, Simon Edwards, Piers Marsh, and Robert Spragg	Honored	
ASCAP Film and Television Music Awards	2005	Top Television Series	Jake Black, Simon Edwards, Piers Marsh, and Robert Spragg	Honored	
Banff Rockie Awards	2000	Best Continuing Series	The Sopranos (for "College")	Won	
Banff Rockie Awards	2001	Best Continuing Series	The Sopranos (for "Episode 28")	Won	
Banff Rockie Awards	2003	Best Continuing Series	The Sopranos (for "Whoever Did This")	Nominated	
Banff Rockie Awards	2004	Best Continuing Series	The Sopranos (for "Two Tonys")	Won	
BMI Film & TV Awards	2002	BMI Cable Award	Howlin' Wolf	Honored	
BMI Film & TV Awards	2003	BMI Cable Award	Howlin' Wolf	Honored	
BMI Film & TV Awards	2004	BMI Cable Award	Howlin' Wolf	Honored	
Chris Awards	2000	Bronze Plaque – Entertainment	The Sopranos	Honored	
Cinema Audio Society Awards	2000	Outstanding Achievement in Sound Mixing for Television Series	Adam Sawelson, Todd Orr, Ron Evans, and Mathew Price (for "I Dream of Jeannie Cusamano")	Won	
Cinema Audio Society Awards	2001	Outstanding Achievement in Sound Mixing for Television Series	Todd Orr, Kevin Burns, Tom Perry, and Mathew Price (for "Commendatori")	Nominated	
Cinema Audio Society Awards	2002	Outstanding Achievement in Sound Mixing for Television Series	Kevin Burns, Todd Orr, Fred Tator, and Mathew Price (for "Pine Barrens")	Nominated	
Cinema Audio Society Awards	2005	Outstanding Achievement in Sound Mixing for Television Series	Kevin Burns, Todd Orr, and Mathew Price (for "Irregular Around the Margins")	Nominated	
Cinema Audio Society Awards	2007	Outstanding Achievement in Sound Mixing for Television Series	Kevin Burns, Todd Orr, and Mathew Price (for "Members Only")	Nominated	
Cinema Audio Society Awards	2008	Outstanding Achievement in Sound Mixing for Television Series	Mathew Price, Kevin Burns, and Todd Orr (for "The Blue Comet")	Nominated	
Costume Designers Guild Awards	2002	Excellence in Contemporary Costume Design for Television	Juliet Polcsa	Won	
Costume Designers Guild Awards	2003	Excellence in Contemporary Costume Design for Television	Juliet Polcsa	Nominated	
Costume Designers Guild Awards	2004	Excellence in Contemporary Costume Design for Television	Juliet Polcsa	Nominated	
Costume Designers Guild Awards	2005	Excellence in Contemporary Costume Design for Television	Juliet Polcsa	Nominated	
Costume Designers Guild Awards	2007	Outstanding Contemporary Television Series	Juliet Polcsa	Nominated	
Costume Designers Guild Awards	2008	Outstanding Contemporary Television Series	Juliet Polcsa	Nominated	
Directors Guild of America Awards	2000	Outstanding Directorial Achievement in Dramatic Series Night	Daniel Attias (for "46 Long") (Note: Additional nominees: Henry J. Bronchtein and Ilene S. Landress (unit production managers); Mark McGann (first assistant director); Michelle L. Keiser (second assistant director))	Nominated	
Directors Guild of America Awards	2000	Outstanding Directorial Achievement in Dramatic Series Night	Henry J. Bronchtein (for "Nobody Knows Anything") (Note: Additional nominees: Ilene S. Landress (unit production manager); Mark McGann (first assistant director); Michelle L. Keiser (second assistant director))	Nominated	
Directors Guild of America Awards	2000	Outstanding Directorial Achievement in Dramatic Series Night	Allen Coulter (for "College") (Note: Additional nominees: Henry J. Bronchtein (unit production manager); Michael DeCasper (first assistant director); Kristin Cameron-Bernstein (second assistant director))	Nominated	
Directors Guild of America Awards	2000	Outstanding Directorial Achievement in Dramatic Series Night	David Chase (for "The Sopranos") (Note: Additional nominees: Alysse Bezahler (unit production manager); Henry J. Bronchtein (first assistant director); Kenneth G. Brown (second assistant director))	Won	
Directors Guild of America Awards	2001	Outstanding Directorial Achievement in Dramatic Series Night	Henry J. Bronchtein (for "From Where to Eternity") (Note: Additional nominees: Ilene S. Landress (unit production manager); Mark McGann (first assistant director); Lisa M. Rowe (second assistant director))	Nominated	
Directors Guild of America Awards	2001	Outstanding Directorial Achievement in Dramatic Series Night	Allen Coulter (for "The Knight in White Satin Armor") (Note: Additional nominees: Henry J. Bronchtein (unit production manager); Mark McGann (first assistant director); Jeff Bernstein (second assistant director))	Nominated	
Directors Guild of America Awards	2001	Outstanding Directorial Achievement in Dramatic Series Night	John Patterson (for "Funhouse")	Nominated	
Directors Guild of America Awards	2002	Outstanding Directorial Achievement in Dramatic Series Night	Steve Buscemi (for "Pine Barrens") (Note: Additional nominees: Scott Hornbacher (unit production manager); Michael DeCasper (first assistant director); Scott Schaeffer (second assistant director); Noreen Cheleden (second second assistant director))	Nominated	
Directors Guild of America Awards	2003	Outstanding Directorial Achievement in Dramatic Series Night	John Patterson (for "Whitecaps") (Note: Additional nominees: Scott Hornbacher (unit production manager); Michael DeCasper (first assistant director); Kristin Cameron-Bernstein (second assistant director); John Silvestri (second second assistant director); Mikki Ziska (additional second assistant director))	Won	
Directors Guild of America Awards	2003	Outstanding Directorial Achievement in Dramatic Series Night	Tim Van Patten (for "Whoever Did This") (Note: Additional nominees: Henry J. Bronchtein (unit production manager); Michael DeCasper (first assistant director); Kristin Cameron-Bernstein (second assistant director); John Silvestri (second second assistant director))	Nominated	
Directors Guild of America Awards	2005	Outstanding Directorial Achievement in Dramatic Series Night	John Patterson (for "All Due Respect") (Note: Additional nominees: Ilene S. Landress and Scott Hornbacher (unit production managers); Michael DeCasper (first assistant director); Kristin Cameron-Bernstein (second assistant director); John Silvestri (second second assistant director); Charlie Foster (DGA trainee))	Nominated	
Directors Guild of America Awards	2005	Outstanding Directorial Achievement in Dramatic Series Night	Tim Van Patten (for "Long Term Parking") (Note: Additional nominees: Henry J. Bronchtein (unit production manager); Mark McGann (first assistant director); Noreen Cheleden (second assistant director); John Silvestri (second second assistant director); Charlie Foster (DGA trainee))	Nominated	
Directors Guild of America Awards	2007	Outstanding Directorial Achievement in Dramatic Series Night	David Nutter (for "Join the Club") (Note: Additional nominees: Henry J. Bronchtein (unit production manager); Mark McGann (first assistant director); Noreen Cheleden (second assistant director); Matt Gordon (second second assistant director); Marcy Patterson (DGA trainee))	Nominated	
Directors Guild of America Awards	2007	Outstanding Directorial Achievement in Dramatic Series Night	Tim Van Patten (for "Members Only") (Note: Additional nominees: Scott Hornbacher (unit production manager); Jeff Bernstein (first assistant director); Nancy Herrmann (second assistant director); Matt Gordon (second second assistant director); Marcy Patterson (DGA trainee))	Nominated	
Directors Guild of America Awards	2008	Outstanding Directorial Achievement in Dramatic Series Night	David Chase (for "Made in America") (Note: Additional nominees: Henry J. Bronchtein and Ilene S. Landress (unit production managers); Jeff Bernstein (first assistant director); Nancy Herrmann (second assistant director); Charlie Foster (second second assistant director); Selena Beal (additional second second assistant director); Regina Heymann (second assistant director/location manager); Marcos Gonzalez Palma (DGA trainee))	Nominated	
Directors Guild of America Awards	2008	Outstanding Directorial Achievement in Dramatic Series Night	Tim Van Patten (for "Soprano Home Movies") (Note: Additional nominees: Henry J. Bronchtein and Ilene S. Landress (unit production managers); John E. Gallagher (first assistant director); Peter Soldo (second assistant director); Charlie Foster (second second assistant director); Henri Sann (additional second second assistant director); April Taylor (second assistant director/location manager); Kathleen Mulligan (DGA trainee))	Nominated	
Edgar Awards	2002	Best Television Episode	"Pine Barrens" (teleplay by Terence Winter; story by Tim Van Patten and Winter)	Won	
Edgar Awards	2005	Special Edgar Award	David Chase (Note: Also recognized for his work on The Rockford Files, Kolchak: The Night Stalker, and "many other breakthrough TV shows")	Honored	
GLAAD Media Awards	2007	Outstanding Drama Series	The Sopranos	Nominated	
Golden Globe Awards	2000	Best Television Series – Drama	The Sopranos	Won	
Golden Globe Awards	2000	Best Actor in a Television Series – Drama	James Gandolfini	Won	
Golden Globe Awards	2000	Best Actress in a Television Series – Drama	Lorraine Bracco	Nominated	
Golden Globe Awards	2000	Best Actress in a Television Series – Drama	Edie Falco	Won	
Golden Globe Awards	2000	Best Supporting Actress – Series, Miniseries, or Television Film	Nancy Marchand	Won	
Golden Globe Awards	2001	Best Television Series – Drama	The Sopranos	Nominated	
Golden Globe Awards	2001	Best Actor in a Television Series – Drama	James Gandolfini	Nominated	
Golden Globe Awards	2001	Best Actress in a Television Series – Drama	Lorraine Bracco	Nominated	
Golden Globe Awards	2001	Best Actress in a Television Series – Drama	Edie Falco	Nominated	
Golden Globe Awards	2002	Best Television Series – Drama	The Sopranos	Nominated	
Golden Globe Awards	2002	Best Actor in a Television Series – Drama	James Gandolfini	Nominated	
Golden Globe Awards	2002	Best Actress in a Television Series – Drama	Lorraine Bracco	Nominated	
Golden Globe Awards	2002	Best Actress in a Television Series – Drama	Edie Falco	Nominated	
Golden Globe Awards	2003	Best Television Series – Drama	The Sopranos	Nominated	
Golden Globe Awards	2003	Best Actor in a Television Series – Drama	James Gandolfini	Nominated	
Golden Globe Awards	2003	Best Actress in a Television Series – Drama	Edie Falco	Won	
Golden Globe Awards	2003	Best Supporting Actor – Series, Miniseries, or Television Film	Michael Imperioli	Nominated	
Golden Globe Awards	2005	Best Television Series – Drama	The Sopranos	Nominated	
Golden Globe Awards	2005	Best Actress in a Television Series – Drama	Edie Falco	Nominated	
Golden Globe Awards	2005	Best Supporting Actor – Series, Miniseries, or Television Film	Michael Imperioli	Nominated	
Golden Globe Awards	2005	Best Supporting Actress – Series, Miniseries, or Television Film	Drea de Matteo	Nominated	
Golden Globe Awards	2007	Best Actress in a Television Series – Drama	Edie Falco	Nominated	
Golden Globe Awards	2008	Best Actress in a Television Series – Drama	Edie Falco	Nominated	
Golden Reel Awards	2000	Best Sound Editing – Television Episodic – Dialogue & ADR	Ray Spiess, William H. Angarola, Cindy Rabideau, Anna MacKenzie, Mike Marchain, Robert Guastini, Benjamin Beardwood, Warren Smith, Barbara Harris, Mathew Price, Adam Sawelson, Robert Deschaine, Paul J. Zydel, and Tami Treadwell (for "A Hit Is a Hit")	Won	
Golden Reel Awards	2000	Best Sound Editing – Television Episodic – Music	Kathryn Dayak and Ron Evans (for "A Hit Is a Hit")	Won	
Golden Reel Awards	2001	Best Sound Editing – Television Episodic – Effects & Foley	Anna MacKenzie, Rick Hinson, Mike Marchain, Zane Bruce, Joseph Sabella, Kevin Burns, Todd Orr, Tom Perry, and Brian Ruberg (for "The Knight in White Satin Armor")	Nominated	
Golden Reel Awards	2001	Best Sound Editing – Television Episodic – Music	Kathryn Dayak and Tom Perry (for "Commendatori")	Nominated	
Golden Reel Awards	2002	Best Sound Editing in Television – Music, Episodic Live Action	Kathryn Dayak (for "Mr. Ruggerio's Neighborhood") (Note: Additional crew: Fred Tator (re-recording music mixer))	Nominated	
Golden Reel Awards	2005	Best Sound Editing in Television Episodic – Music	Kathryn Dayak (for "Marco Polo") (Note: Additional crew: Kevin Burns (music re-recording mixer))	Nominated	
Gracie Awards	2005	Outstanding Supporting Actress in a Drama Series	Drea de Matteo	Honored	
Grammy Awards	2001	Best Compilation Soundtrack Album for a Motion Picture, Television or Other Visual Media	The Sopranos (Note: Nominees: Various artists; David Chase and Martin Bruestle (producers))	Nominated	
Grammy Awards	2002	Best Compilation Soundtrack Album for a Motion Picture, Television or Other Visual Media	The Sopranos: Peppers & Eggs	Nominated	
Hollywood Post Alliance Awards	2007	Outstanding Audio Post – Television	Kevin Burns, Todd Orr, Jason George, Tim Boggs, and Jed Dodge (for "The Blue Comet")	Nominated	
International Festival of Audiovisual Programs Awards	2000	Silver FIPA – Series and Serials	The Sopranos (Note: Episodes 1, 2, and 13 were selected for the festival.)	Honored	
International Festival of Audiovisual Programs Awards	2000	Gold FIPA for Male Performance – Series and Serials	James Gandolfini	Honored	
Make-Up Artists and Hair Stylists Guild Awards	2003	Best Character Hairstyling for a Television Series	Victor DeNicola, Jr., Dale Brownell, and Gerald DeCarlo (Note: Presented for their work with Edie Falco and James Gandolfini)	Nominated	
NAACP Image Awards	2002	Outstanding Supporting Actor in a Drama Series	Charles S. Dutton	Nominated	
Peabody Awards	2000	—	The Sopranos (Note: Presented to Home Box Office and Brillstein-Grey Entertainment)	Honored	
Peabody Awards	2001	—	The Sopranos (Note: Presented to Home Box Office, Chase Films, and Brad Grey Television)	Honored	
PEN USA Literary Awards	2008	Teleplay	Terence Winter (for "The Second Coming")	Won	
People's Choice Awards	2005	Favorite TV Drama	The Sopranos	Nominated	
Primetime Emmy Awards	1999	Outstanding Drama Series	The Sopranos (Note: Nominees: David Chase and Brad Grey (executive producers); Robin Green and Mitchell Burgess (co-executive producers); Frank Renzulli (supervising producer); Ilene S. Landress and Allen Coulter (producers))	Nominated	
Primetime Emmy Awards	1999	Outstanding Lead Actor in a Drama Series	James Gandolfini	Nominated	
Primetime Emmy Awards	1999	Outstanding Lead Actress in a Drama Series	Lorraine Bracco	Nominated	
Primetime Emmy Awards	1999	Outstanding Lead Actress in a Drama Series	Edie Falco	Won	
Primetime Emmy Awards	1999	Outstanding Supporting Actress in a Drama Series	Nancy Marchand	Nominated	
Primetime Emmy Awards	1999	Outstanding Directing for a Drama Series	David Chase (for "The Sopranos")	Nominated	
Primetime Emmy Awards	1999	Outstanding Writing for a Drama Series	David Chase (for "The Sopranos")	Nominated	
Primetime Emmy Awards	1999	Outstanding Writing for a Drama Series	Robin Green and Mitchell Burgess (for "Isabella")	Nominated	
Primetime Emmy Awards	1999	Outstanding Writing for a Drama Series	James Manos, Jr. and David Chase (for "College")	Won	
Primetime Emmy Awards	1999	Outstanding Writing for a Drama Series	Frank Renzulli (for "Nobody Knows Anything")	Nominated	
Primetime Emmy Awards	2000	Outstanding Drama Series	The Sopranos (Note: Nominees: David Chase, Brad Grey, Robin Green, and Mitchell Burgess (executive producers); Frank Renzulli (co-executive producer); Ilene S. Landress, Martin Bruestle, Allen Coulter, Todd A. Kessler, and Terence Winter (producers))	Nominated	
Primetime Emmy Awards	2000	Outstanding Lead Actor in a Drama Series	James Gandolfini	Won	
Primetime Emmy Awards	2000	Outstanding Lead Actress in a Drama Series	Lorraine Bracco	Nominated	
Primetime Emmy Awards	2000	Outstanding Lead Actress in a Drama Series	Edie Falco	Nominated	
Primetime Emmy Awards	2000	Outstanding Supporting Actor in a Drama Series	Dominic Chianese	Nominated	
Primetime Emmy Awards	2000	Outstanding Supporting Actress in a Drama Series	Nancy Marchand	Nominated	
Primetime Emmy Awards	2000	Outstanding Directing for a Drama Series	Allen Coulter (for "The Knight in White Satin Armor")	Nominated	
Primetime Emmy Awards	2000	Outstanding Directing for a Drama Series	John Patterson (for "Funhouse")	Nominated	
Primetime Emmy Awards	2000	Outstanding Writing for a Drama Series	David Chase and Todd A. Kessler (for "Funhouse")	Nominated	
Primetime Emmy Awards	2000	Outstanding Writing for a Drama Series	Robin Green and Mitchell Burgess (for "The Knight in White Satin Armor")	Nominated	
Primetime Emmy Awards	2001	Outstanding Drama Series	The Sopranos (Note: Nominees: David Chase, Brad Grey, Robin Green, and Mitchell Burgess (executive producers); Ilene S. Landress (co-executive producer); Terence Winter (supervising producer); Martin Bruestle, Henry J. Bronchtein, and Todd A. Kessler (producers))	Nominated	
Primetime Emmy Awards	2001	Outstanding Lead Actor in a Drama Series	James Gandolfini	Won	
Primetime Emmy Awards	2001	Outstanding Lead Actress in a Drama Series	Lorraine Bracco	Nominated	
Primetime Emmy Awards	2001	Outstanding Lead Actress in a Drama Series	Edie Falco	Won	
Primetime Emmy Awards	2001	Outstanding Supporting Actor in a Drama Series	Dominic Chianese	Nominated	
Primetime Emmy Awards	2001	Outstanding Supporting Actor in a Drama Series	Michael Imperioli	Nominated	
Primetime Emmy Awards	2001	Outstanding Supporting Actress in a Drama Series	Aida Turturro	Nominated	
Primetime Emmy Awards	2001	Outstanding Directing for a Drama Series	Steve Buscemi (for "Pine Barrens")	Nominated	
Primetime Emmy Awards	2001	Outstanding Directing for a Drama Series	Allen Coulter (for "University")	Nominated	
Primetime Emmy Awards	2001	Outstanding Directing for a Drama Series	Tim Van Patten (for "Amour Fou")	Nominated	
Primetime Emmy Awards	2001	Outstanding Writing for a Drama Series	Robin Green and Mitchell Burgess (for "Employee of the Month")	Won	
Primetime Emmy Awards	2001	Outstanding Writing for a Drama Series	Lawrence Konner (for "Second Opinion")	Nominated	
Primetime Emmy Awards	2001	Outstanding Writing for a Drama Series	Frank Renzulli and David Chase (for "Amour Fou")	Nominated	
Primetime Emmy Awards	2001	Outstanding Writing for a Drama Series	Terence Winter and Tim Van Patten (for "Pine Barrens")	Nominated	
Primetime Emmy Awards	2003	Outstanding Drama Series	The Sopranos (Note: Nominees: David Chase, Brad Grey, Robin Green, Mitchell Burgess, and Ilene S. Landress (executive producers); Terence Winter (co-executive producer); Henry J. Bronchtein and Martin Bruestle (producers))	Nominated	
Primetime Emmy Awards	2003	Outstanding Lead Actor in a Drama Series	James Gandolfini	Won	
Primetime Emmy Awards	2003	Outstanding Lead Actress in a Drama Series	Edie Falco	Won	
Primetime Emmy Awards	2003	Outstanding Supporting Actor in a Drama Series	Michael Imperioli	Nominated	
Primetime Emmy Awards	2003	Outstanding Supporting Actor in a Drama Series	Joe Pantoliano	Won	
Primetime Emmy Awards	2003	Outstanding Directing for a Drama Series	John Patterson (for "Whitecaps")	Nominated	
Primetime Emmy Awards	2003	Outstanding Directing for a Drama Series	Tim Van Patten (for "Whoever Did This")	Nominated	
Primetime Emmy Awards	2003	Outstanding Writing for a Drama Series	Robin Green and Mitchell Burgess (for "Whoever Did This")	Nominated	
Primetime Emmy Awards	2003	Outstanding Writing for a Drama Series	Robin Green, Mitchell Burgess, and David Chase (for "Whitecaps")	Won	
Primetime Emmy Awards	2003	Outstanding Writing for a Drama Series	Terence Winter (for "Eloise")	Nominated	
Primetime Emmy Awards	2004	Outstanding Drama Series	The Sopranos (Note: Nominees: David Chase, Brad Grey, Robin Green, Mitchell Burgess, Ilene S. Landress, and Terence Winter (executive producers); Henry J. Bronchtein (co-executive producer); Matthew Weiner and Martin Bruestle (producers))	Won	
Primetime Emmy Awards	2004	Outstanding Lead Actor in a Drama Series	James Gandolfini	Nominated	
Primetime Emmy Awards	2004	Outstanding Lead Actress in a Drama Series	Edie Falco	Nominated	
Primetime Emmy Awards	2004	Outstanding Supporting Actor in a Drama Series	Steve Buscemi	Nominated	
Primetime Emmy Awards	2004	Outstanding Supporting Actor in a Drama Series	Michael Imperioli	Won	
Primetime Emmy Awards	2004	Outstanding Supporting Actress in a Drama Series	Drea de Matteo	Won	
Primetime Emmy Awards	2004	Outstanding Directing for a Drama Series	Allen Coulter (for "Irregular Around the Margins")	Nominated	
Primetime Emmy Awards	2004	Outstanding Directing for a Drama Series	Tim Van Patten (for "Long Term Parking")	Nominated	
Primetime Emmy Awards	2004	Outstanding Writing for a Drama Series	Michael Caleo (for "Where's Johnny?")	Nominated	
Primetime Emmy Awards	2004	Outstanding Writing for a Drama Series	Robin Green and Mitchell Burgess (for "Irregular Around the Margins")	Nominated	
Primetime Emmy Awards	2004	Outstanding Writing for a Drama Series	Matthew Weiner and Terence Winter (for "Unidentified Black Males") (Note: While both Weiner and Winter are credited by the Writers Guild of America with writing the episode, the initial nomination list only named Weiner as a nominee. Later sources list both as nominees.)	Nominated	
Primetime Emmy Awards	2004	Outstanding Writing for a Drama Series	Terence Winter (for "Long Term Parking")	Won	
Primetime Emmy Awards	2006	Outstanding Drama Series	The Sopranos (Note: Nominees: David Chase, Brad Grey, Ilene S. Landress, and Terence Winter (executive producers); Henry J. Bronchtein and Matthew Weiner (co-executive producers); Diane Frolov and Andrew Schneider (supervising producers); Martin Bruestle and Gianna Maria Smart (producers))	Nominated	
Primetime Emmy Awards	2006	Outstanding Supporting Actor in a Drama Series	Michael Imperioli	Nominated	
Primetime Emmy Awards	2006	Outstanding Directing for a Drama Series	David Nutter (for "Join the Club")	Nominated	
Primetime Emmy Awards	2006	Outstanding Directing for a Drama Series	Tim Van Patten (for "Members Only")	Nominated	
Primetime Emmy Awards	2006	Outstanding Writing for a Drama Series	Terence Winter (for "Members Only")	Won	
Primetime Emmy Awards	2007	Outstanding Drama Series	The Sopranos (Note: Nominees: David Chase, Brad Grey, Ilene S. Landress, Terence Winter, and Matthew Weiner (executive producers); Henry J. Bronchtein (co-executive producer); Diane Frolov and Andrew Schneider (supervising producers); Martin Bruestle and Gianna Maria Smart (producers))	Won	
Primetime Emmy Awards	2007	Outstanding Lead Actor in a Drama Series	James Gandolfini	Nominated	
Primetime Emmy Awards	2007	Outstanding Lead Actress in a Drama Series	Edie Falco	Nominated	
Primetime Emmy Awards	2007	Outstanding Supporting Actor in a Drama Series	Michael Imperioli	Nominated	
Primetime Emmy Awards	2007	Outstanding Supporting Actress in a Drama Series	Lorraine Bracco	Nominated	
Primetime Emmy Awards	2007	Outstanding Supporting Actress in a Drama Series	Aida Turturro	Nominated	
Primetime Emmy Awards	2007	Outstanding Directing for a Drama Series	Alan Taylor (for "Kennedy and Heidi")	Won	
Primetime Emmy Awards	2007	Outstanding Writing for a Drama Series	David Chase (for "Made in America")	Won	
Primetime Emmy Awards	2007	Outstanding Writing for a Drama Series	Matthew Weiner and David Chase (for "Kennedy and Heidi")	Nominated	
Primetime Emmy Awards	2007	Outstanding Writing for a Drama Series	Terence Winter (for "The Second Coming")	Nominated	
Primetime Creative Arts Emmy Awards	1999	Outstanding Art Direction for a Series	Edward Pisoni, Diann Duthie, and Jessica Lanier (for "The Sopranos")	Nominated	
Primetime Creative Arts Emmy Awards	1999	Outstanding Casting for a Series	Georgianne Walken and Sheila Jaffe	Won	
Primetime Creative Arts Emmy Awards	1999	Outstanding Guest Actor in a Drama Series	John Heard	Nominated	
Primetime Creative Arts Emmy Awards	1999	Outstanding Single-Camera Picture Editing for a Series	Joanna Cappuccilli (for "The Sopranos")	Won	
Primetime Creative Arts Emmy Awards	1999	Outstanding Sound Editing for a Series	Ray Spiess, Jr., William Angarola, Robert Guastini, Benjamin Beardwood, Anna MacKenzie, Mike Marchain, Rick Hinson, Bruce Swanson, Mark Cleary, Cindy Rabideau, Kathryn Dayak, Zane Bruce, and Joe Sabella (for "I Dream of Jeannie Cusamano")	Nominated	
Primetime Creative Arts Emmy Awards	1999	Outstanding Sound Mixing for a Drama Series	Mathew Price, Todd Orr, Ron Evans, and Adam Sawelson (for "A Hit Is a Hit")	Nominated	
Primetime Creative Arts Emmy Awards	2000	Outstanding Art Direction for a Single-Camera Series	Bob Shaw, Scott Murphy, and Janet Shaw (for "House Arrest")	Nominated	
Primetime Creative Arts Emmy Awards	2000	Outstanding Casting for a Drama Series	Georgianne Walken and Sheila Jaffe	Nominated	
Primetime Creative Arts Emmy Awards	2000	Outstanding Cinematography for a Single-Camera Series	Phil Abraham (for "D-Girl")	Nominated	
Primetime Creative Arts Emmy Awards	2000	Outstanding Costumes for a Series	Juliet Polcsa, Lauren Press, Kim Wilcox, Gail Fitzgibbons, and Kevin Faherty (for "Commendatori")	Nominated	
Primetime Creative Arts Emmy Awards	2000	Outstanding Hairstyling for a Series	Mel McKinney and William A. Kohout (for "Full Leather Jacket")	Nominated	
Primetime Creative Arts Emmy Awards	2000	Outstanding Single-Camera Picture Editing for a Series	William B. Stich (for "The Knight in White Satin Armor")	Nominated	
Primetime Creative Arts Emmy Awards	2000	Outstanding Single-Camera Picture Editing for a Series	Sidney Wolinsky (for "Funhouse")	Nominated	
Primetime Creative Arts Emmy Awards	2000	Outstanding Sound Mixing for a Drama Series	Mathew Price, Kevin Burns, Todd Orr, and Tom Perry (for "D-Girl")	Nominated	
Primetime Creative Arts Emmy Awards	2001	Outstanding Art Direction for a Single-Camera Series	Bob Shaw, Scott Murphy, and Janet Shaw (for "Amour Fou")	Nominated	
Primetime Creative Arts Emmy Awards	2001	Outstanding Casting for a Drama Series	Georgianne Walken and Sheila Jaffe	Nominated	
Primetime Creative Arts Emmy Awards	2001	Outstanding Costumes for a Series	Juliet Polcsa, Lauren Press, and Kim Wilcox (for "Proshai, Livushka")	Nominated	
Primetime Creative Arts Emmy Awards	2001	Outstanding Guest Actress in a Drama Series	Annabella Sciorra	Nominated	
Primetime Creative Arts Emmy Awards	2001	Outstanding Makeup for a Series	Kymbra Callaghan and Stephen M. Kelley (for "Employee of the Month")	Won (Note: Tied with Cheri Montesanto, Matthew W. Mungle, Laverne Munroe, Clinton Wayne, and Robin L. Neal for "Deadalive" from The X-Files)	
Primetime Creative Arts Emmy Awards	2001	Outstanding Single-Camera Picture Editing for a Series	Conrad Gonzalez (for "Pine Barrens")	Nominated	
Primetime Creative Arts Emmy Awards	2001	Outstanding Single-Camera Picture Editing for a Series	Sidney Wolinsky (for "Employee of the Month")	Nominated	
Primetime Creative Arts Emmy Awards	2001	Outstanding Single-Camera Sound Mixing for a Series	Mathew Price, Kevin Burns, Todd Orr, and Fred Tator (for "Another Toothpick")	Nominated	
Primetime Creative Arts Emmy Awards	2003	Outstanding Casting for a Drama Series	Georgianne Walken and Sheila Jaffe	Nominated	
Primetime Creative Arts Emmy Awards	2003	Outstanding Single-Camera Picture Editing for a Drama Series	William B. Stich (for "Whoever Did This")	Nominated	
Primetime Creative Arts Emmy Awards	2003	Outstanding Single-Camera Sound Mixing for a Series	Kevin Burns, Todd Orr, and Mathew Price (for "Whoever Did This")	Nominated	
Primetime Creative Arts Emmy Awards	2004	Outstanding Art Direction for a Single-Camera Series	Bob Shaw, Scott P. Murphy, and Janet Shaw (for "In Camelot", "Cold Cuts", and "The Test Dream")	Nominated	
Primetime Creative Arts Emmy Awards	2004	Outstanding Casting for a Drama Series	Georgianne Walken and Sheila Jaffe	Nominated	
Primetime Creative Arts Emmy Awards	2004	Outstanding Cinematography for a Single-Camera Series	Phil Abraham (for "Irregular Around the Margins")	Nominated	
Primetime Creative Arts Emmy Awards	2004	Outstanding Costumes for a Series	Juliet Polcsa, Lorraine Z. Calvert, Lauren Press, Barbara J. Hause, and Elizabeth Feldbauer (for "Rat Pack")	Nominated	
Primetime Creative Arts Emmy Awards	2004	Outstanding Single-Camera Picture Editing for a Drama Series	Conrad Gonzalez (for "Irregular Around the Margins")	Nominated	
Primetime Creative Arts Emmy Awards	2004	Outstanding Single-Camera Picture Editing for a Drama Series	William B. Stich (for "Long Term Parking")	Nominated	
Primetime Creative Arts Emmy Awards	2004	Outstanding Single-Camera Picture Editing for a Drama Series	Sidney Wolinsky (for "All Happy Families...")	Nominated	
Primetime Creative Arts Emmy Awards	2004	Outstanding Single-Camera Sound Mixing for a Series	Kevin Burns, Todd Orr, and Mathew Price (for "Irregular Around the Margins")	Nominated	
Primetime Creative Arts Emmy Awards	2006	Outstanding Cinematography for a Single-Camera Series	Phil Abraham (for "The Ride")	Nominated	
Primetime Creative Arts Emmy Awards	2006	Outstanding Costumes for a Series	Juliet Polcsa, Joseph La Corte, and Elizabeth Feldbauer (for "Mr. & Mrs. John Sacrimoni Request...")	Nominated	
Primetime Creative Arts Emmy Awards	2007	Outstanding Cinematography for a Single-Camera Series	Phil Abraham (for "Soprano Home Movies")	Nominated	
Primetime Creative Arts Emmy Awards	2007	Outstanding Guest Actor in a Drama Series	Tim Daly	Nominated	
Primetime Creative Arts Emmy Awards	2007	Outstanding Single-Camera Picture Editing for a Drama Series	William B. Stich (for "Soprano Home Movies")	Nominated	
Primetime Creative Arts Emmy Awards	2007	Outstanding Single-Camera Picture Editing for a Drama Series	Lynne M. Whitlock (for "The Second Coming")	Nominated	
Primetime Creative Arts Emmy Awards	2007	Outstanding Sound Mixing for a Comedy or Drama Series (One-Hour)	Mathew Price, Kevin Burns, and Todd Orr (for "Stage 5")	Nominated	
Prism Awards	2003	Television Drama Series Multi-Episode Storyline	The Sopranos (for Christopher's addiction)	Nominated	
Prism Awards	2003	Performance in a Television Drama Series Multi-Episode Storyline	Michael Imperioli	Nominated	
Producers Guild of America Awards	2000	Norman Felton Producer of the Year Award in Episodic Television	The Sopranos (Note: Nominee: David Chase (Note: Brad Grey was originally listed as a nominee for the award but was later removed after a review by the Producers Guild of America. Following the decision, Chase reportedly said he would not accept the award if Grey's contributions were not recognized. Chase did not appear at the awards ceremony on March 2 when The Sopranos won the award.))	Won	
Producers Guild of America Awards	2002	Norman Felton Producer of the Year Award in Episodic Television – Drama	The Sopranos (Note: Nominees: David Chase, Brad Grey, Mitchell Burgess, Robin Green, Ilene S. Landress, and Terence Winter)	Nominated	
Producers Guild of America Awards	2003	Norman Felton Producer of the Year Award in Episodic Television – Drama	The Sopranos	Nominated	
Producers Guild of America Awards	2005	Norman Felton Producer of the Year Award in Episodic Television – Drama	The Sopranos (Note: Nominees: David Chase, Brad Grey, Mitchell Burgess, Robin Green, Ilene S. Landress, Terence Winter, Henry J. Bronchtein, Matthew Weiner, and Martin Bruestle)	Won	
Producers Guild of America Awards	2007	Norman Felton Producer of the Year Award in Episodic Television – Drama	The Sopranos (Note: Nominees: David Chase, Brad Grey, Ilene S. Landress, Terence Winter, Matthew Weiner, Diane Frolov, Andrew Schneider, Henry J. Bronchtein, Martin Bruestle, and Gianna Maria Smart)	Nominated	
Producers Guild of America Awards	2008	Norman Felton Producer of the Year Award in Episodic Television – Drama	The Sopranos	Won	
Satellite Awards	2000	Best Television Series, Drama	The Sopranos	Nominated	
Satellite Awards	2000	Best Performance by an Actor in a Series, Drama	James Gandolfini	Nominated	
Satellite Awards	2000	Best Performance by an Actress in a Series, Drama	Lorraine Bracco	Nominated	
Satellite Awards	2000	Best Performance by an Actress in a Series, Drama	Edie Falco	Nominated	
Satellite Awards	2001	Best Television Series, Drama	The Sopranos	Nominated	
Satellite Awards	2001	Best Performance by an Actor in a Series, Drama	James Gandolfini	Nominated	
Satellite Awards	2001	Best Performance by an Actress in a Series, Drama	Edie Falco	Nominated	
Satellite Awards	2002	Best Television Series, Drama	The Sopranos	Nominated	
Satellite Awards	2002	Best Performance by an Actor in a Series, Drama	James Gandolfini	Nominated	
Satellite Awards	2002	Best Performance by an Actress in a Series, Drama	Edie Falco	Won	
Screen Actors Guild Awards	2000	Outstanding Performance by an Ensemble in a Drama Series	The Sopranos (Note: Nominees: Lorraine Bracco, Dominic Chianese, Edie Falco, James Gandolfini, Robert Iler, Michael Imperioli, Nancy Marchand, Vincent Pastore, Jamie-Lynn Sigler, Tony Sirico, and Steven Van Zandt)	Won	
Screen Actors Guild Awards	2000	Outstanding Performance by a Male Actor in a Drama Series	James Gandolfini	Won	
Screen Actors Guild Awards	2000	Outstanding Performance by a Female Actor in a Drama Series	Lorraine Bracco	Nominated	
Screen Actors Guild Awards	2000	Outstanding Performance by a Female Actor in a Drama Series	Edie Falco	Won	
Screen Actors Guild Awards	2000	Outstanding Performance by a Female Actor in a Drama Series	Nancy Marchand	Nominated	
Screen Actors Guild Awards	2001	Outstanding Performance by an Ensemble in a Drama Series	The Sopranos (Note: Nominees: Lorraine Bracco, Dominic Chianese, Drea de Matteo, Edie Falco, James Gandolfini, Robert Iler, Michael Imperioli, Nancy Marchand, Vincent Pastore, David Proval, Jamie-Lynn Sigler, Tony Sirico, Aida Turturro, and Steven Van Zandt)	Nominated	
Screen Actors Guild Awards	2001	Outstanding Performance by a Male Actor in a Drama Series	James Gandolfini	Nominated	
Screen Actors Guild Awards	2001	Outstanding Performance by a Female Actor in a Drama Series	Edie Falco	Nominated	
Screen Actors Guild Awards	2002	Outstanding Performance by an Ensemble in a Drama Series	The Sopranos (Note: Nominees: Lorraine Bracco, Federico Castelluccio, Dominic Chianese, Drea de Matteo, Edie Falco, James Gandolfini, Robert Iler, Michael Imperioli, Joe Pantoliano, Steve Schirripa, Jamie-Lynn Sigler, Tony Sirico, Aida Turturro, Steven Van Zandt, and John Ventimiglia)	Nominated	
Screen Actors Guild Awards	2002	Outstanding Performance by a Male Actor in a Drama Series	James Gandolfini	Nominated	
Screen Actors Guild Awards	2002	Outstanding Performance by a Female Actor in a Drama Series	Lorraine Bracco	Nominated	
Screen Actors Guild Awards	2002	Outstanding Performance by a Female Actor in a Drama Series	Edie Falco	Nominated	
Screen Actors Guild Awards	2003	Outstanding Performance by an Ensemble in a Drama Series	The Sopranos (Note: Nominees: Lorraine Bracco, Federico Castelluccio, Dominic Chianese, Vincent Curatola, Drea de Matteo, Edie Falco, James Gandolfini, Robert Iler, Michael Imperioli, Joe Pantoliano, Steve Schirripa, Jamie-Lynn Sigler, Tony Sirico, Aida Turturro, Steven Van Zandt, and John Ventimiglia)	Nominated	
Screen Actors Guild Awards	2003	Outstanding Performance by a Male Actor in a Drama Series	James Gandolfini	Won	
Screen Actors Guild Awards	2003	Outstanding Performance by a Female Actor in a Drama Series	Lorraine Bracco	Nominated	
Screen Actors Guild Awards	2003	Outstanding Performance by a Female Actor in a Drama Series	Edie Falco	Won	
Screen Actors Guild Awards	2005	Outstanding Performance by an Ensemble in a Drama Series	The Sopranos (Note: Nominees: Lorraine Bracco, Steve Buscemi, Dominic Chianese, Vincent Curatola, Drea de Matteo, Edie Falco, James Gandolfini, Robert Iler, Michael Imperioli, Steve Schirripa, Jamie-Lynn Sigler, Tony Sirico, Aida Turturro, Steven Van Zandt, and John Ventimiglia)	Nominated	
Screen Actors Guild Awards	2005	Outstanding Performance by a Male Actor in a Drama Series	James Gandolfini	Nominated	
Screen Actors Guild Awards	2005	Outstanding Performance by a Female Actor in a Drama Series	Drea de Matteo	Nominated	
Screen Actors Guild Awards	2005	Outstanding Performance by a Female Actor in a Drama Series	Edie Falco	Nominated	
Screen Actors Guild Awards	2007	Outstanding Performance by an Ensemble in a Drama Series	The Sopranos (Note: Nominees: Sharon Angela, Lorraine Bracco, Max Casella, Dominic Chianese, Edie Falco, James Gandolfini, Joseph R. Gannascoli, Dan Grimaldi, Robert Iler, Michael Imperioli, Steve Schirripa, Jamie-Lynn Sigler, Tony Sirico, Aida Turturro, Maureen Van Zandt, Steven Van Zandt, and Frank Vincent)	Nominated	
Screen Actors Guild Awards	2007	Outstanding Performance by a Male Actor in a Drama Series	James Gandolfini	Nominated	
Screen Actors Guild Awards	2007	Outstanding Performance by a Female Actor in a Drama Series	Edie Falco	Nominated	
Screen Actors Guild Awards	2008	Outstanding Performance by an Ensemble in a Drama Series	The Sopranos (Note: Nominees: Greg Antonacci, Lorraine Bracco, Edie Falco, James Gandolfini, Dan Grimaldi, Robert Iler, Michael Imperioli, Arthur J. Nascarella, Steve Schirripa, Matt Servitto, Jamie-Lynn Sigler, Tony Sirico, Aida Turturro, Steven Van Zandt, and Frank Vincent)	Won	
Screen Actors Guild Awards	2008	Outstanding Performance by a Male Actor in a Drama Series	James Gandolfini	Won	
Screen Actors Guild Awards	2008	Outstanding Performance by a Female Actor in a Drama Series	Edie Falco	Won	
Television Critics Association Awards	1999	Program of the Year	The Sopranos	Won	
Television Critics Association Awards	1999	Outstanding New Program	The Sopranos	Won	
Television Critics Association Awards	1999	Outstanding Achievement in Drama	The Sopranos	Won	
Television Critics Association Awards	1999	Individual Achievement in Drama	David Chase	Nominated	
Television Critics Association Awards	1999	Individual Achievement in Drama	James Gandolfini	Won (Note: Tied with David E. Kelley for The Practice)	
Television Critics Association Awards	2000	Program of the Year	The Sopranos	Nominated	
Television Critics Association Awards	2000	Outstanding Achievement in Drama	The Sopranos	Nominated	
Television Critics Association Awards	2000	Individual Achievement in Drama	James Gandolfini	Won	
Television Critics Association Awards	2001	Program of the Year	The Sopranos	Won	
Television Critics Association Awards	2001	Outstanding Achievement in Drama	The Sopranos	Won (Note: Tied with The West Wing)	
Television Critics Association Awards	2001	Individual Achievement in Drama	Edie Falco	Nominated	
Television Critics Association Awards	2001	Individual Achievement in Drama	James Gandolfini	Won	
Television Critics Association Awards	2003	Outstanding Achievement in Drama	The Sopranos	Nominated	
Television Critics Association Awards	2003	Individual Achievement in Drama	Edie Falco	Won	
Television Critics Association Awards	2003	Individual Achievement in Drama	James Gandolfini	Nominated	
Television Critics Association Awards	2004	Program of the Year	The Sopranos	Nominated	
Television Critics Association Awards	2004	Outstanding Achievement in Drama	The Sopranos	Won	
Television Critics Association Awards	2004	Individual Achievement in Drama	Edie Falco	Nominated	
Television Critics Association Awards	2004	Individual Achievement in Drama	James Gandolfini	Nominated	
Television Critics Association Awards	2006	Program of the Year	The Sopranos	Nominated	
Television Critics Association Awards	2006	Outstanding Achievement in Drama	The Sopranos	Nominated	
Television Critics Association Awards	2006	Individual Achievement in Drama	James Gandolfini	Nominated	
Television Critics Association Awards	2007	Outstanding Achievement in Drama	The Sopranos	Won	
Television Critics Association Awards	2007	Heritage Award	The Sopranos	Won	
TV Land Awards	2008	Character You Really Don't Want to Make Angry	Christopher Moltisanti (Michael Imperioli)	Nominated	
TV Land Awards	2008	Siblings That Make You Grateful for Your Own Crazy Family	Meadow Soprano (Jamie-Lynn Sigler) and A. J. Soprano (Robert Iler)	Nominated	
Viewers for Quality Television Awards	1999	Best Quality Drama	The Sopranos	Nominated	
Viewers for Quality Television Awards	1999	Best Actor, Quality Drama	James Gandolfini	Nominated	
Viewers for Quality Television Awards	1999	Best Supporting Actress, Quality Drama	Nancy Marchand	Nominated	
Viewers for Quality Television Awards	2000	Best Quality Drama	The Sopranos	Nominated	
Viewers for Quality Television Awards	2000	Best Actor, Quality Drama	James Gandolfini	Nominated	
Viewers for Quality Television Awards	2000	Best Actress, Quality Drama	Edie Falco	Nominated	
Writers Guild of America Awards	2000	Episodic Drama	Jason Cahill (for "Meadowlands")	Won	
Writers Guild of America Awards	2001	Episodic Drama	Robin Green and Mitchell Burgess (for "The Knight in White Satin Armor")	Nominated	
Writers Guild of America Awards	2001	Episodic Drama	Terence Winter (for "Big Girls Don't Cry")	Nominated	
Writers Guild of America Awards	2002	Episodic Drama	David Chase (for "Proshai, Livushka")	Nominated	
Writers Guild of America Awards	2002	Episodic Drama	Robin Green and Mitchell Burgess (for "Employee of the Month")	Nominated	
Writers Guild of America Awards	2002	Episodic Drama	Terence Winter and Tim Van Patten (for "Pine Barrens")	Won	
Writers Guild of America Awards	2003	Episodic Drama	Robin Green and Mitchell Burgess (for "Whoever Did This")	Nominated	
Writers Guild of America Awards	2005	Episodic Drama	Terence Winter (for "Long Term Parking")	Nominated	
Writers Guild of America Awards	2007	Dramatic Series	The Sopranos (Note: Nominees: Mitchell Burgess, David Chase, Diane Frolov, Robin Green, Andrew Schneider, Matthew Weiner, and Terence Winter)	Won	
Writers Guild of America Awards	2008	Dramatic Series	The Sopranos (Note: Nominees: David Chase, Diane Frolov, Andrew Schneider, Matthew Weiner, and Terence Winter)	Nominated	
Writers Guild of America Awards	2008	Episodic Drama	Terence Winter (for "The Second Coming")	Won	
Young Artist Awards	2000	Best Performance in a TV Drama Series – Supporting Young Actor	Robert Iler	Nominated	
Young Artist Awards	2000	Best Performance in a TV Drama Series – Supporting Young Actress	Jamie-Lynn Sigler	Nominated	
Young Artist Awards	2000	Best Performance in a TV Drama Series – Young Actor Age Ten and Under	Bobby Boriello	Nominated	
Young Artist Awards	2001	Best Performance in a TV Drama Series – Supporting Young Actor	Robert Iler	Nominated	
Young Artist Awards	2001	Best Performance in a TV Drama Series – Supporting Young Actress	Jamie-Lynn Sigler	Nominated	
Young Artist Awards	2002	Best Performance in a TV Drama Series – Leading Young Actor	Robert Iler	Nominated	
YoungStar Awards	1999	Best Young Actor/Performance in a Drama TV Series	Robert Iler	Won	
YoungStar Awards	1999	Best Young Actress/Performance in a Drama TV Series	Jamie-Lynn Sigler	Won	
YoungStar Awards	2000	Best Young Actor/Performance in a Drama TV Series	Robert Iler	Won	
YoungStar Awards	2000	Best Young Actress/Performance in a Drama TV Series	Jamie-Lynn Sigler	Won	
