= The Holy Family with Saints Anne and Catherine of Alexandria =

1648 painting by Jusepe de Ribera

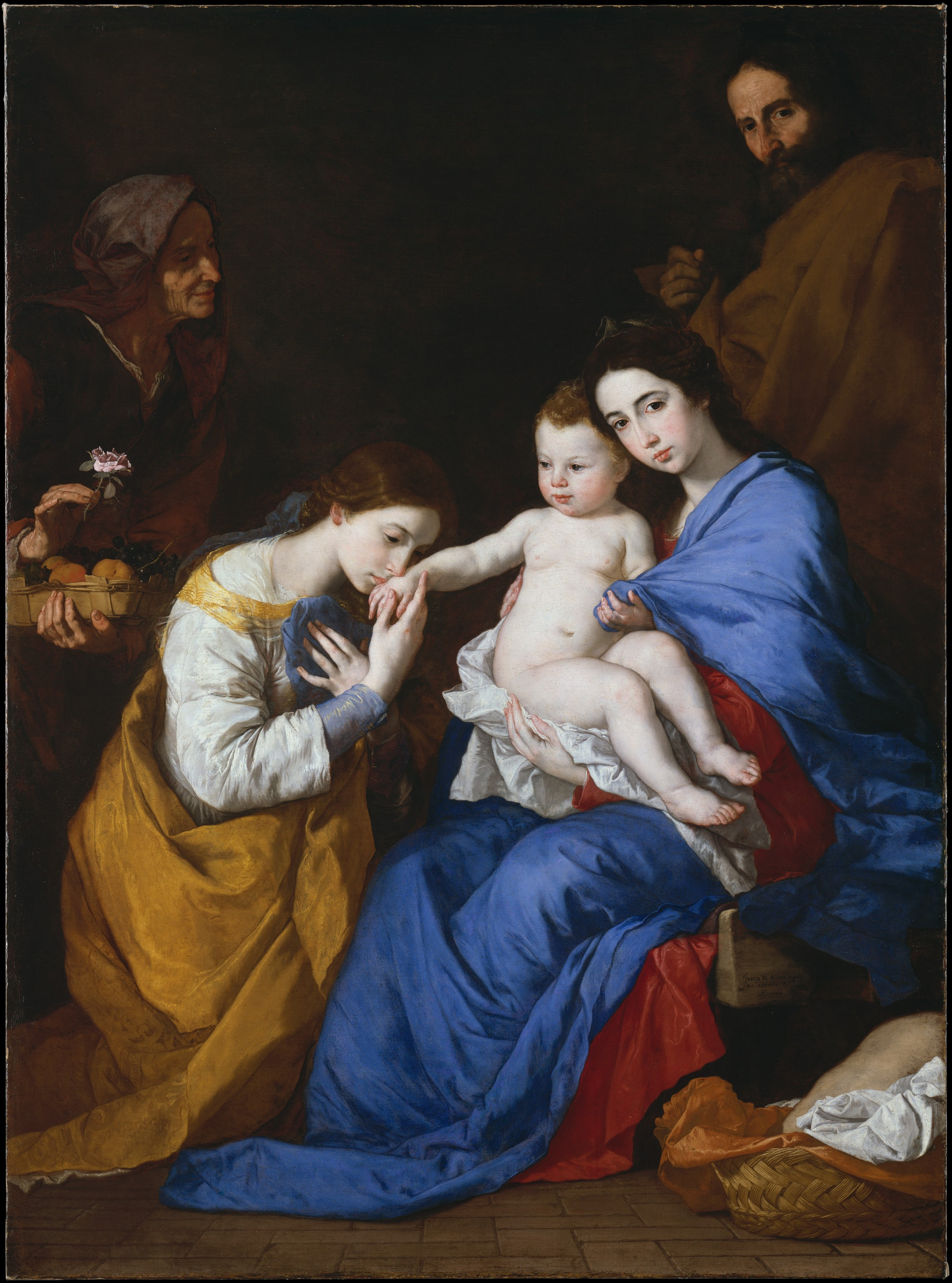
- Artist: Jusepe de Ribera
- Year: 1648
- Type: oil on canvas
- Dimensions: 209 cm × 154 cm (82 in × 61 in)
- Location: Metropolitan Museum of Art

The Holy Family with Saints Anne and Catherine of Alexandria is a 1648 painting by the Spanish artist Jusepe de Ribera owned by the Metropolitan Museum of Art in New York. The museum acquired The Holy Family with Saints Anne and Catherine of Alexandria in 1934 from the Earl of Harewood.

The painting appears in the television show The Sopranos during the episode "Amor Fou".
