= Ilene S. Landress =

American television and film producer

Ilene S. Landress is an American television and film producer. Her credits include The Sopranos, Camping, Girls, and Mildred Pierce. Landress won two production awards for The Sopranos at the Primetime Emmy Awards. She attended Union College, obtained a master's degree in nutrition from Columbia University and was accepted to Albany Medical College but ultimately did not attend, choosing to enter the entertainment industry instead. One of her first jobs was being a production assistant on Crocodile Dundee, which she found after encountering the film production on the streets of New York.

In the 1990s she was a producer for DreamWorks Television for ABC, working on Dear Diary, which won an Academy Award as a short film, and the TV show Spin City.

David Chase hired her as a producer on The Sopranos in 1997. Landress even played a cameo role as a doctor in an episode of the show.
