= Georgianne Walken =

American casting director

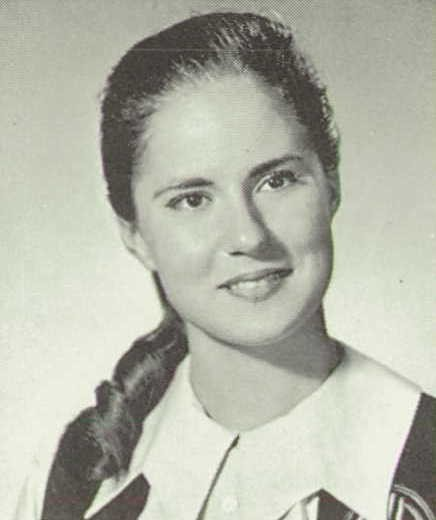
- Born: Georgianne Leigh Korzen; February 8, 1944 (age 82); Chicago, Illinois, U.S.
- Occupation: Casting director
- Years active: 1990–2007
- Spouse: Christopher Walken (m. 1969)

Georgianne Leigh Walken (née Thon; born February 8, 1944) is an American former casting director.

== Life and career ==
Her original surname, Korzen, was changed to that of her maternal aunt, Irene Thon, who raised her.

Walken, along with casting partner Sheila Jaffe of Walken/Jaffe, has been the casting director for more than 80 television shows and movies since 1989, including The Sopranos and Entourage.

Walken also had minor acting roles in a 2006 episode of The Sopranos, as well as the 1983 film Brainstorm with her husband Christopher Walken and the late Natalie Wood. The Walkens have been married since 1969 and reside in rural Connecticut. Walken and Jaffe did the casting for Basquiat, in which Christopher Walken has a cameo appearance. Among the other films which Walken and Jaffe have cast include Monkeybone, Bedazzled, Black Knight, Two Girls and a Guy, American Strays, and Subway Stories.
