= Martin Bruestle =

American television producer

Martin Bruestle is an American television producer best known for his work on Northern Exposure and The Sopranos. After graduating from the University of Minnesota in 1987, Martin Bruestle was selected to participate in the Academy of Television Arts & Sciences College Internship Program on the television series Thirtysomething. He was hired as the post production coordinator for three seasons of the series.

In 1990, Bruestle began work on Northern Exposure as the associate producer/co-producer for 60 episodes through all six seasons of the series. He was responsible for selecting much of the music on the series and helped produce two soundtrack CDs for the program. He shared the Emmy nominations the show received in 1993 and 1994 with the other crew members, including David Chase, with whom he would work on The Sopranos in 1997.

Bruestle, a native of Bemidji, Minnesota, was president of the Minnesota Association of Student Councils in 1980–81.

== Sources ==
Martin Bruestle on HBO. Accessed 27 Jan 2007.
Hollywood Speaks Our Language article at icommag.com. Accessed 27 Jan 2007.
