= The Sopranos =

American crime drama television series by David Chase

- Genre: Crime drama; Serial drama; Psychological drama; Family drama; Black comedy
- Created by: David Chase
- Showrunner: David Chase
- Starring: James Gandolfini; Lorraine Bracco; Edie Falco; Michael Imperioli; Dominic Chianese; Steven Van Zandt; Tony Sirico; Robert Iler; Jamie-Lynn Sigler
- Opening theme: "Woke Up This Morning (Chosen One Mix)" by Alabama 3
- Ending theme: Various
- Country of origin: United States
- Original language: English
- No. of seasons: 6
- No. of episodes: 86 (list of episodes)

Production
- Executive producers: David Chase; Brad Grey; Robin Green; Mitchell Burgess; Ilene S. Landress; Terence Winter; Matthew Weiner
- Production locations: New Jersey; New York City (Silvercup Studios)
- Cinematography: Alik Sakharov; Phil Abraham
- Editors: Sidney Wolinsky; William B. Stich; Conrad M. Gonzalez
- Camera setup: Single camera
- Running time: 43–75 minutes
- Production companies: Chase Films; Brad Grey Television (Note: Credited as Brillstein-Grey Entertainment in Season 1, current prints of the season use the Brad Grey Televlsion logo.); HBO Entertainment

Original release
- Network: HBO
- Release: January 10, 1999 – June 10, 2007

Related
- The Many Saints of Newark

The Sopranos is an American crime drama television series created by David Chase for HBO. The series follows Tony Soprano (James Gandolfini), a New Jersey Mafia boss. Suffering from panic attacks, he reluctantly begins seeing psychiatrist Dr. Jennifer Melfi (Lorraine Bracco), who encourages him to open up about his difficulties balancing his family life with his criminal activities. Other important characters include Tony's family, Mafia colleagues, and rivals, most notably his wife Carmela (Edie Falco), his nephew and protégé Christopher Moltisanti (Michael Imperioli), and his uncle Corrado "Junior" Soprano (Dominic Chianese).

Greenlit in 1997, the series was broadcast on HBO from January 10, 1999, to June 10, 2007, spanning six seasons and 86 episodes. The show was broadcast as a part of HBO's newly launched Sunday night programming block. After its original HBO run, the series entered broadcast and cable syndication in the United States and other territories. The series was produced by HBO in association with Chase Films and Brad Grey Television. It was primarily filmed at Silvercup Studios in New York City, with some on-location filming in New Jersey. The executive producers throughout the show's run were Chase, Brad Grey, Robin Green, Mitchell Burgess, Ilene S. Landress, Terence Winter, and Matthew Weiner.

Widely regarded as one of the greatest and most influential television series of all time, it has been credited by media commentators with ushering in the Second Golden Age of Television, marked by high-quality serialized dramas. The series won multiple awards, including Peabody Awards for its first two seasons, 21 Primetime Emmy Awards, and 5 Golden Globe Awards. The Sopranos has been the subject of extensive critical analysis and debate for its portrayal of organized crime and Italian-American identity, and has been referenced or parodied in other media, including a video game, soundtrack albums and podcasts. It has inspired tie-in merchandise. When the series premiered, several cast members had limited mainstream exposure; many subsequently received major award nominations or appeared in high-profile film and television roles.

In March 2018, New Line Cinema announced that they had purchased a film detailing the show's background story, set in the 1960s and 1970s during and after the Newark riots. The film, The Many Saints of Newark (2021), was written by Chase and Lawrence Konner and directed by Alan Taylor. It starred Gandolfini's son Michael Gandolfini as a young Tony Soprano.

== Premise ==
The series follows Tony Soprano, a North Jersey-based Italian-American mobster, who tries to balance his family life with his role as the boss of the DiMeo crime family. Tony's career causes him frequent rage and anxiety, and, following a series of panic attacks, begins therapy with psychiatrist Dr. Jennifer Melfi, which becomes a central narrative thread. In Dr. Melfi's office, Tony slowly begins to open up about his emotional problems, even as his career continually leads him into dangerous and even life-threatening scenarios. He finds himself at odds with his wife Carmela, his uncle Junior, and other ambitious family members, as well as the Lupertazzi crime family of New York.

== Production ==
=== Conception ===
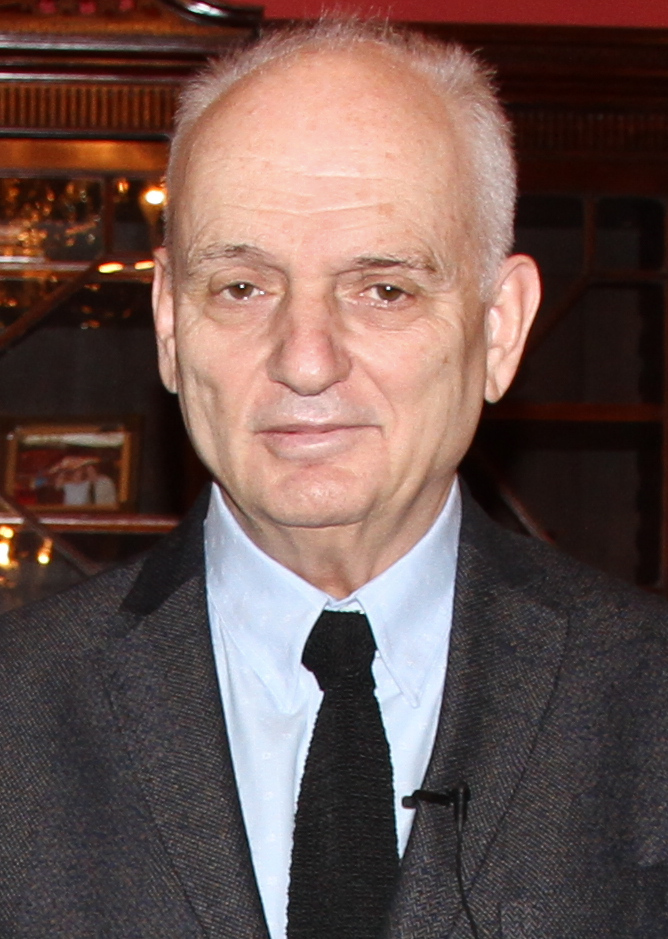
David Chase, creator of The Sopranos, in 2015

David Chase had worked as a television writer and producer for more than 20 years before creating The Sopranos. He had been employed as a staff writer or producer for several television series, including Kolchak: The Night Stalker, Switch, The Rockford Files, I'll Fly Away, and Northern Exposure. He had also co-created the series Almost Grown in 1988. He made his television directorial debut in 1986 with the "Enough Rope for Two" episode of Alfred Hitchcock Presents. He also directed episodes of Almost Grown and I'll Fly Away in 1988 and 1992, respectively. In 1996, he wrote and directed the television film The Rockford Files: Punishment and Crime. He served as showrunner for I'll Fly Away and Northern Exposure in the 1990s. Chase won his first Emmy Award in 1978 for his work on The Rockford Files (shared with fellow producers) and his second for writing the 1980 television film Off the Minnesota Strip. By 1996, he was a coveted showrunner.

I want to tell a story about this particular man. I want to tell the story about the reality of being a mobster—or what I perceive to be the reality of life in organized crime. They aren't shooting each other every day. They sit around eating baked ziti and betting and figuring out who owes who money. Occasionally, violence breaks out—more often than it does in the banking world, perhaps.

— David Chase, creator and showrunner of The Sopranos

The story of The Sopranos was initially conceived as a feature film about "a mobster in therapy having problems with his mother". Chase got some input from his manager Lloyd Braun and decided to adapt it into a television series. He signed a development deal in 1995 with production company Brillstein-Grey and wrote the original pilot script. He drew heavily from his personal life and his experiences growing up in an Italian-American family in New Jersey, and has stated that he tried to apply his own "family dynamic to mobsters". For instance, the tumultuous relationship between series protagonist Tony Soprano and his mother Livia is partially based on Chase's relationship with his own mother. He was also in psychotherapy at the time and modeled the character of Jennifer Melfi after his own psychiatrist.

Chase had been fascinated by organized crime and the mafia from an early age, observing such people while he was growing up. He also was raised on classic gangster films such as The Public Enemy and the crime series The Untouchables. The Sopranos is partly inspired by the Richard Boiardo family, a prominent New Jersey organized crime family when Chase was growing up, and partly on New Jersey's DeCavalcante family. He has mentioned American playwrights Arthur Miller and Tennessee Williams as influences on the show's writing, and Italian director Federico Fellini as an important influence on the show's cinematic style. The series was named after high school friends of his.

I said to myself, this show is about a guy who's turning 40. He's inherited a business from his dad. He's trying to bring it into the modern age. He's got all the responsibilities that go along with that. He's got an overbearing mom that he's still trying to get out from under. Although he loves his wife, he's had an affair. He's got two teenage kids, and he's dealing with the realities of what that is. He's anxious; he's depressed; he starts to see a therapist because he's searching for the meaning of his own life. I thought: the only difference between him and everybody I know is he's the Don of New Jersey.

— Chris Albrecht, president of HBO Original Programming, 1995–2002.

Chase and producer Brad Grey pitched The Sopranos to several networks; Fox showed interest but passed on it after Chase presented them the pilot script. According to Chase, CBS was "fine with all the break-ins and crime" but asked, "does he have to go to a psychiatrist?" They eventually pitched the show to Chris Albrecht, president of HBO Original Programming, who decided to finance a pilot episode which was shot in 1997. Chase directed it himself. They finished the pilot and showed it to HBO executives, but the show was put on hold for several months.

During this time, Chase, who had experienced frustration for a long period with being unable to break out of the TV genre and into film, considered asking HBO for additional funding to shoot 45 more minutes of footage and release The Sopranos as a feature film. In December 1997, HBO decided to produce the series and ordered 12 more episodes for a 13-episode season. The show premiered on HBO on January 10, 1999, with the pilot, "The Sopranos".

==== Baer v. Chase ====
North Jersey prosecutor and municipal judge Robert Baer filed a breach of contract lawsuit against Chase in Trenton, New Jersey, federal court, alleging that he helped to create the show. Baer lost the suit, but he won a ruling that a jury should decide how much he should be paid for services as a location scout, researcher, and story consultant. Baer argued that he had introduced Chase to Tony Spirito, a restaurateur and gambler with alleged mob ties, and Thomas Koczur, a homicide detective for the Elizabeth, New Jersey police department. Chase had conducted interviews and tours with both, which strongly inspired some characters, settings, and storylines portrayed in The Sopranos. On December 19, 2007, a federal jury found against Baer, dismissing all of his claims.

=== Casting ===
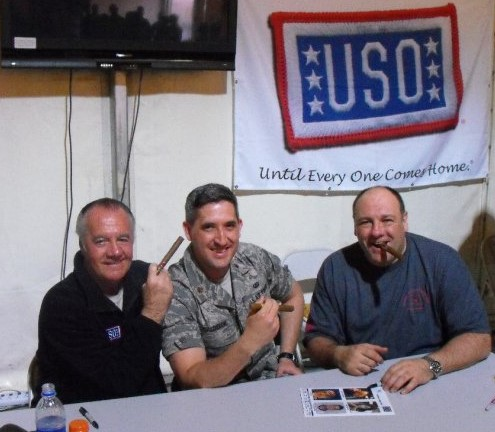
James Gandolfini (right) and Tony Sirico (left) visit the U.S. Air Force during a USO visit to Kuwait in 2010

Many of the actors on The Sopranos are Italian American, with many of them coming from the New York metropolitan area, like the characters they portray. Several had appeared together in films and television series before joining the cast of The Sopranos. The series has 27 actors in common with the 1990 Martin Scorsese gangster film Goodfellas, including main cast members Lorraine Bracco, Michael Imperioli, and Tony Sirico.

The casting directors were Georgianne Walken and Sheila Jaffe. The main cast was put together through a process of auditions and readings. Actors often did not know whether Chase liked their performances or not. Michael Imperioli beat out several actors for the part of Christopher Moltisanti; he said that Chase had "a poker face, so I thought he wasn't into me, and he kept giving me notes and having me try it again, which often is a sign that you're not doing it right." Chase said that he wanted Imperioli because of his performance in Goodfellas.

James Gandolfini was invited to audition for the part of Tony Soprano after casting director Susan Fitzgerald saw a short clip of his performance in the 1993 film True Romance. Lorraine Bracco played the role of mob wife Karen Hill in Goodfellas, and she was originally asked to play the role of Carmela Soprano. She took the role of Dr. Jennifer Melfi instead because she wanted to try something different and felt that the part of the highly educated Dr. Melfi would be more of a challenge for her. Tony Sirico had a criminal history, and he signed on to play Paulie Walnuts so long as his character was not to be a "rat". Sirico had originally auditioned for the role of Uncle Junior with Frank Vincent, but Dominic Chianese landed the role.

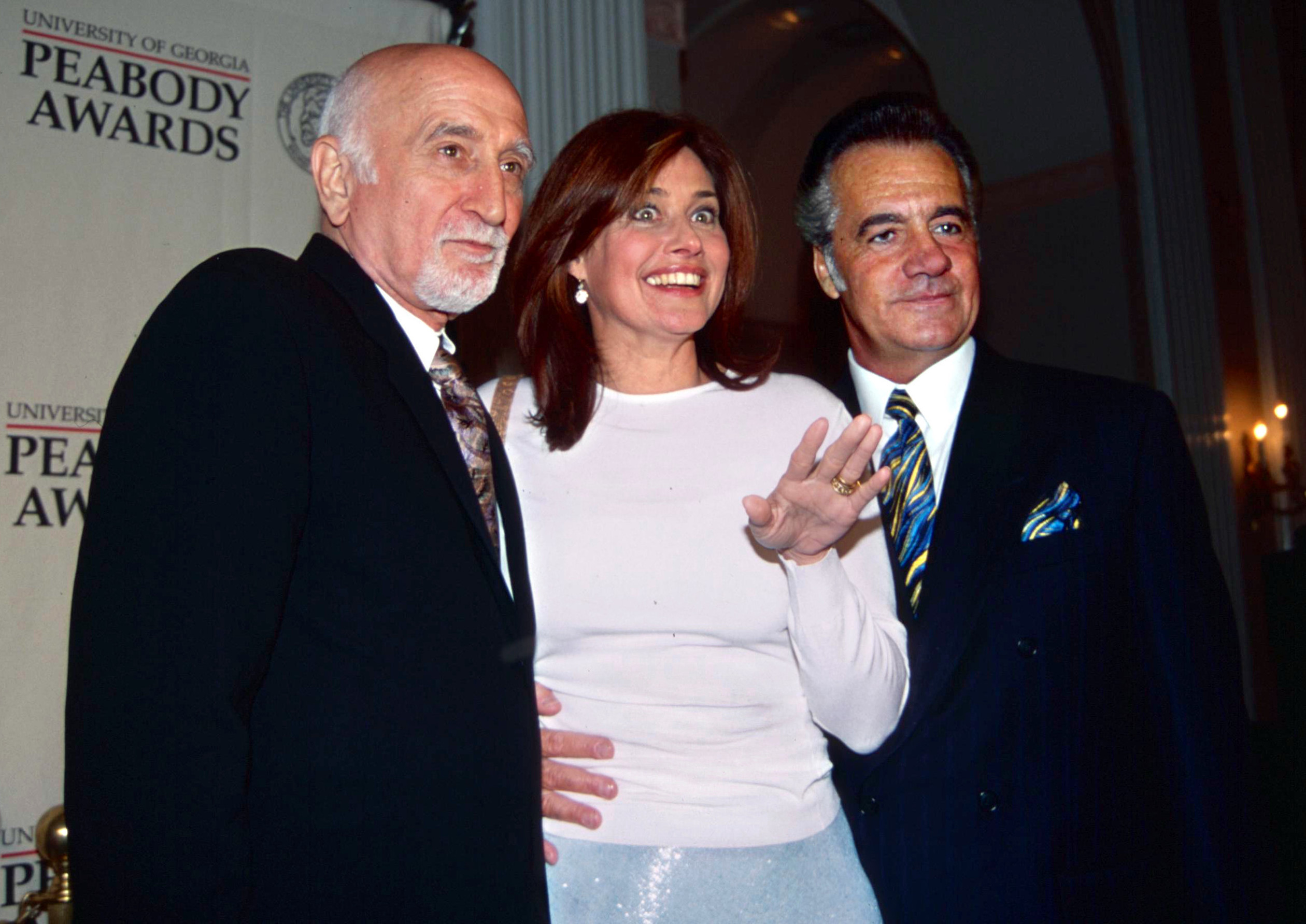
Dominic Chianese, Lorraine Bracco and Tony Sirico at the 2000 Peabody Awards ceremony.

Chase was impressed with Steven Van Zandt's humorous appearance and presence after seeing him induct The Rascals into the Rock and Roll Hall of Fame in 1997, and invited him to audition. Van Zandt, a guitarist in Bruce Springsteen's E Street Band, had never acted before. He auditioned for the role of Tony Soprano, but HBO felt that the role should go to an experienced actor, so Chase wrote a new part for him. Van Zandt eventually agreed to star on the show as consigliere Silvio Dante, and his real-life spouse Maureen was cast as his on-screen wife Gabriella.

The cast of the debut season of the series consisted of largely unknown actors, with the exception of Bracco, Chianese, and Nancy Marchand, but many cast members were noted for their acting ability and received mainstream attention for their performances. Subsequent seasons saw established actors Joe Pantoliano, Robert Loggia, Steve Buscemi, and Frank Vincent join the starring cast, along with well-known actors in recurring roles such as Peter Bogdanovich, John Heard, Robert Patrick, Peter Riegert, Annabella Sciorra, and David Strathairn.

Numerous well-known actors appeared in one or two episodes, such as Lauren Bacall, Daniel Baldwin, Annette Bening, Polly Bergen, Sandra Bernhard, Paul Dano, Charles S. Dutton, Jon Favreau, Janeane Garofalo, Hal Holbrook, Tim Kang, Elias Koteas, Ben Kingsley, Linda Lavin, Ken Leung, Julianna Margulies, Sydney Pollack, Wilmer Valderrama, Alicia Witt, and Burt Young. Ray Liotta, who was eventually cast as two of the Moltisanti brothers in The Many Saints of Newark film prequel, was approached by Chase at one point to appear in the third or fourth seasons of the show, but the plan did not work out.

=== Crew ===
Series creator and executive producer David Chase served as showrunner and head writer for the production of all six seasons of the show. He was deeply involved with the general production of every episode and is noted for being a very controlling, demanding, and specific producer. He wrote or co-wrote between two and seven episodes per season and would oversee all the editing, consult with episode directors, give actors character motivation, approve casting choices and set designs, and do extensive but uncredited rewrites of episodes written by others. Brad Grey served as executive producer alongside Chase but had no creative input on the show. Many members of the creative team behind The Sopranos were handpicked by Chase, some being old friends and colleagues of his; others were selected after interviews conducted by producers of the show.

Many of the show's writers had worked in television before joining the writing staff of The Sopranos. The writing team and married couple Robin Green and Mitchell Burgess worked on the series as writers and producers from the first to the fifth season; they had previously worked with Chase on Northern Exposure. Terence Winter joined the writing staff during the production of the second season and served as executive producer from season five onwards. He practiced law for two years before deciding to pursue a career as a screenwriter, and he caught the attention of Chase through writer Frank Renzulli.

Matthew Weiner served as staff writer and producer for the show's fifth and sixth seasons. He wrote a script for the series Mad Men in 2000 which was passed on to Chase, who was so impressed that he immediately offered Weiner a job as a writer for The Sopranos. Cast members Michael Imperioli and Toni Kalem portray Christopher Moltisanti and Angie Bonpensiero respectively, and they also wrote episodes for the show. Imperioli wrote five episodes of seasons two through five, and Kalem wrote one episode of season five.

Other writers included Frank Renzulli, Todd A. Kessler (co-creator of Damages), writing team Diane Frolov and Andrew Schneider who worked with Chase on Northern Exposure, and Lawrence Konner, who co-created Almost Grown with Chase in 1988. In total, 20 writers or writing teams are credited with writing episodes of The Sopranos. Of these, Tim Van Patten and Maria Laurino receive a single story credit, and eight others are credited with writing a sole episode. The most prolific writers of the series were Chase (30 credited episodes, including story credits), Winter (25 episodes), Green and Burgess (22 episodes), Weiner (12 episodes), and Renzulli (9 episodes).

Many of the directors had previously worked on television series and independent films. The most frequent directors of the series were Tim Van Patten (20 episodes), John Patterson (13 episodes), Allen Coulter (12 episodes), and Alan Taylor (9 episodes), all of whom have a background in television. Recurring cast members Steve Buscemi and Peter Bogdanovich also directed episodes of the series intermittently. Chase directed the pilot episode and the series finale. Both episodes were photographed by the show's original director of photography Alik Sakharov, who later alternated episodes with Phil Abraham. The show's photography and directing is noted for its feature film quality. This look was achieved by Chase collaborating with Sakharov. "From the pilot, we would sit down with the whole script and break the scenes down into shots. That's what you do with feature films."

=== Music ===
The Sopranos is noted for its eclectic music selections and has received considerable critical attention for its effective use of previously recorded songs. Chase personally selected all of the show's music with producer Martin Bruestle and music editor Kathryn Dayak, sometimes also consulting Steven Van Zandt. The music was usually selected once the production and editing of an episode was completed, but on occasion sequences were filmed to match preselected pieces of music.

The show's opening theme is "Woke Up This Morning" (Chosen One Mix), written by, remixed and performed by British band Alabama 3. With few exceptions, a different song plays over the closing credits of each episode. Many songs are repeated multiple times through an episode, such as "Living on a Thin Line" by The Kinks in the season three episode "University" and "Glad Tidings" by Van Morrison in the season five finale "All Due Respect". Other songs are heard several times throughout the series. A notable example is "Con te partirò", performed by Italian singer Andrea Bocelli, which plays several times in relation to the character of Carmela Soprano. While the show utilizes a wealth of previously recorded music, it is also notable for its lack of originally composed incidental music, compared with other television programs.

Two soundtrack albums containing music from the series have been released. The first, titled The Sopranos: Music from the HBO Original Series, was released in 1999. It contains selections from the show's first two seasons and reached No. 54 on the U.S. Billboard 200.

A second soundtrack compilation titled The Sopranos – Peppers & Eggs: Music from the HBO Series, was released in 2001. This double-disc album contains songs and selected dialogue from the show's first three seasons. It reached No. 38 on the U.S. Billboard 200.

The ending to the show has drawn attention and sparked controversy. The song "Don't Stop Believin'" by Journey plays at the end of the series finale. While Journey granted the rights to use the song in the ending of the series, their one request was that the scene not contain any violence or deaths.

=== Sets and locations ===
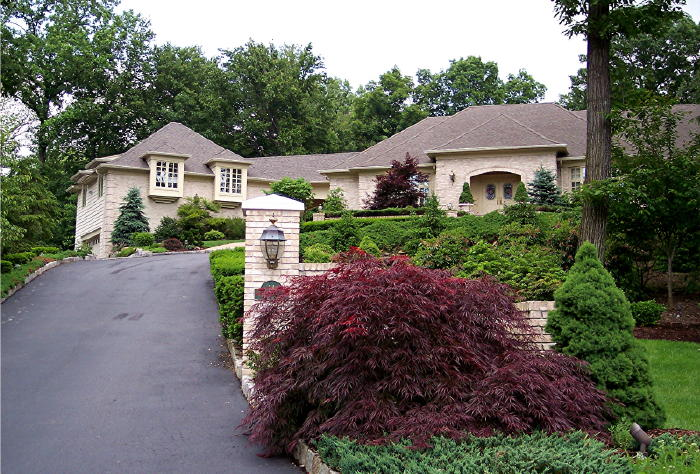
The Soprano house in North Caldwell (2006)

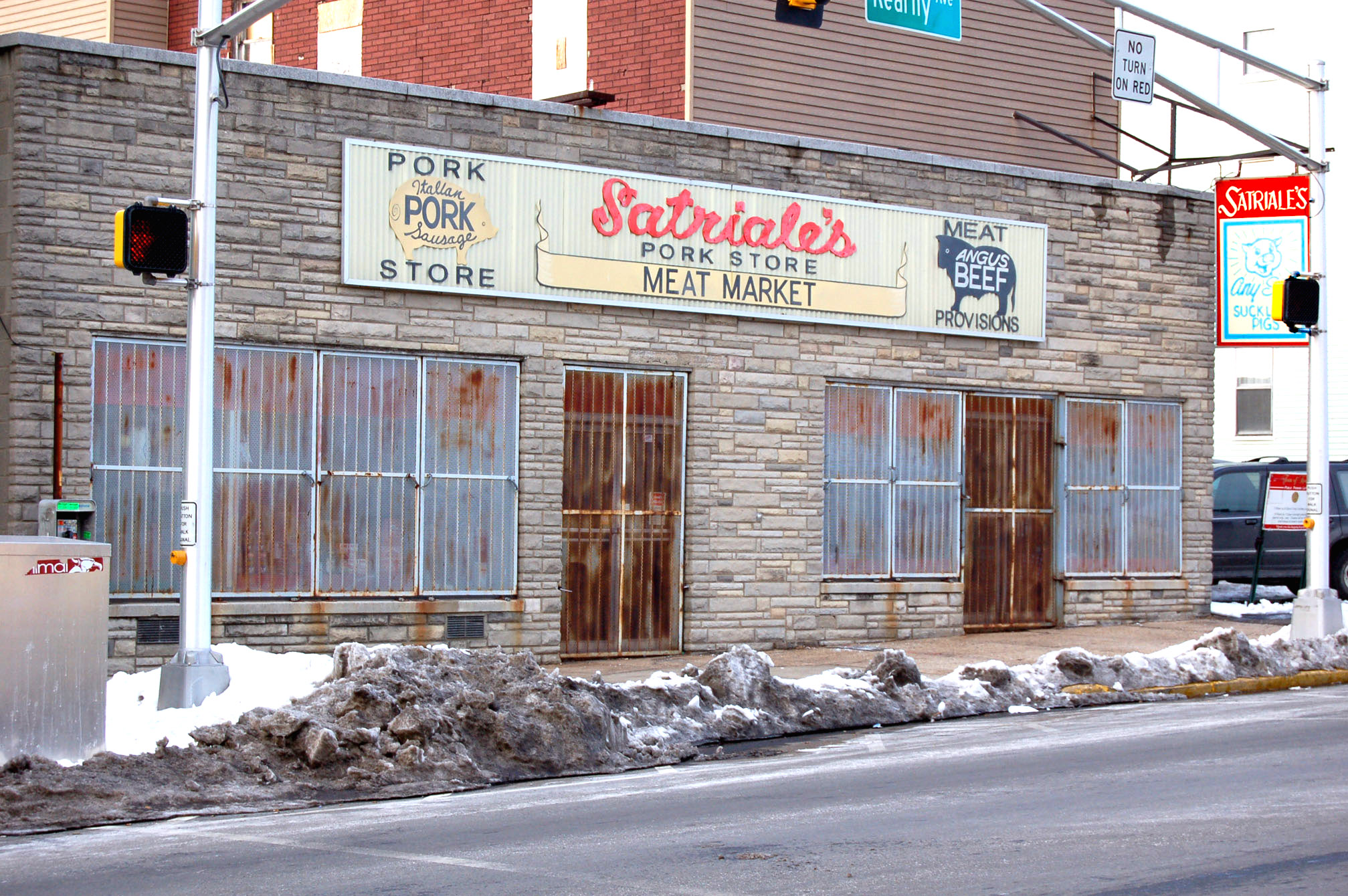
Satriale's Pork Store in Kearny (2007)

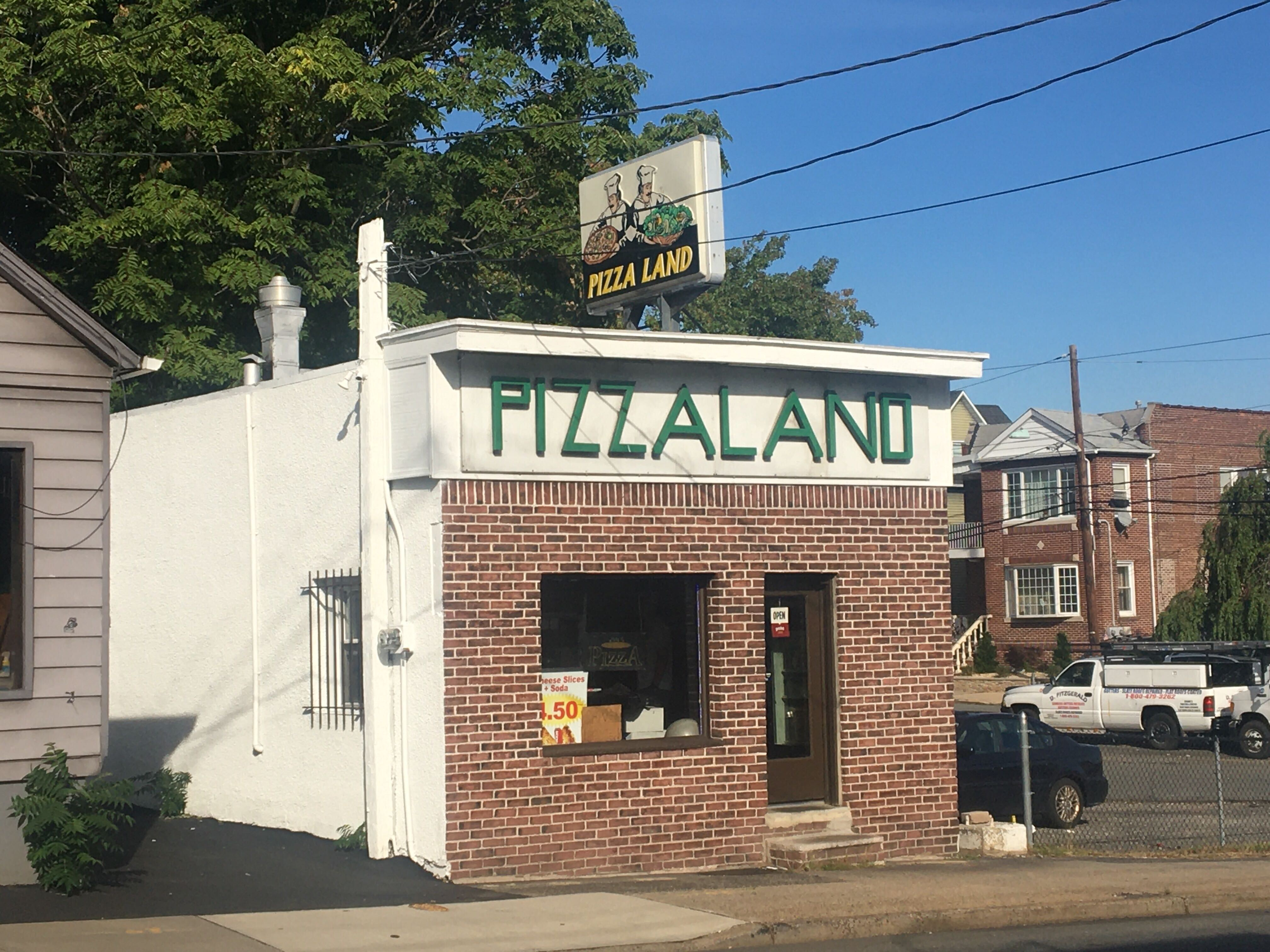
Pizza Land in North Arlington (2021)

The majority of the exterior scenes took place in New Jersey and were filmed on location, with the majority of the interior shots filmed at Silvercup Studios in New York City, including most indoor shots of the Soprano residence, the back room of the strip club Bada Bing!, and Dr. Melfi's office. The pork store was called Centanni's Meat Market in the pilot episode, an actual butchery in Elizabeth, New Jersey. After the series was picked up by HBO, the producers leased a building with a storefront in Kearny, New Jersey which served as the shooting location for exterior and interior scenes for the remainder of production; renamed Satriale's Pork Store. After the series ended, the building was demolished. Several scenes were filmed in Paterson, New Jersey on Washington Street and Cianci Street, Lou Costello Memorial, and Great Falls where a hit was famously executed in the first season.

The strip club Bada Bing! was owned and operated by Silvio Dante on the show, and is an actual strip club on Route 17 in Lodi, New Jersey. Exteriors and interiors were shot on location except for the back room. The club is called Satin Dolls and was an existing business before the show started. The club continued to operate during the eight years that the show was filmed there, and a business arrangement was worked out with the owner. Locations manager Mark Kamine recalls that the owner was "very gracious" as long as the shooting did not "conflict with his business time".

Scenes set at the restaurant Vesuvio, owned and operated in the series by character Artie Bucco, were filmed at a restaurant called Manolo's located in Elizabeth for the first episode. After the destruction of Vesuvio within the context of the series, Artie opened a new restaurant called Nuovo Vesuvio; exterior scenes set there were filmed at an Italian restaurant called Punta Dura located in Long Island City. All the exterior and some interior shots of the Soprano residence were filmed on location at a private residence in North Caldwell, New Jersey.

=== Title sequence ===
Tony Soprano is seen emerging from the Lincoln Tunnel out of Manhattan and passing through the tollbooth for the New Jersey Turnpike. Numerous landmarks in and around Newark and Jersey City, New Jersey, are then shown passing by the camera as Tony drives down the highway. The sequence ends with Tony pulling into the driveway of his suburban home. Chase has said that the goal of the title sequence was to show that this particular mafia show was about New Jersey, as opposed to New York, where most similar dramas have been set.

In the first three seasons, between Tony leaving the tunnel and passing through the toll plaza, the title sequence included a shot of the World Trade Center towers in the right side-view mirror. After the September 11 attacks, beginning with the show's fourth season, this shot was removed and replaced with a more generic view.

In a 2010 issue of TV Guide, the show's opening title sequence ranked No. 10 on a list of TV's top 10 credits sequences, as selected by readers.

A parody of the opening sequence was used in an episode of The Simpsons. In "Poppa's Got a Brand New Badge", a variation on the sequence is used, with Fat Tony leaving a Springfield tunnel instead of Tony. Fat Tony then continues to drive through Springfield to the same soundtrack as the original.

== Cast and characters ==
Clips of The Sopranos characters

Tony Soprano (James Gandolfini) is the series' protagonist. Tony is one of the capos of the New Jersey–based DiMeo crime family at the beginning of the series; he eventually becomes its undisputed boss. He is also the patriarch of the Soprano household. Throughout the series, Tony struggles to balance the needs of his Mafia family with those of his wife and children. Because he is prone to bouts of clinical depression and reflex syncope, after a fainting spell (triggered by a panic attack), Tony's physician refers him for treatment by psychiatrist Dr. Jennifer Melfi (Lorraine Bracco) in the show's first episode.

Dr. Melfi treats Tony to the best of her ability, even though he is prone to violent, angry outbursts. Melfi is usually thoughtful, rational, and humane, which is a stark contrast to Tony's personality. Tony, a serial womanizer, divulges that he is attracted to Dr. Melfi. She harbors some degree of attraction to Tony too, but rarely admits it and never acts on it. Melfi is drawn to the challenge of helping such an unusual client and naively assumes that their doctor–patient relationship will not affect her personal life.

Adding to Tony's complicated life is his relationship with his wife Carmela (Edie Falco), which is strained by his constant infidelity and her struggle to reconcile her misgivings about Tony's business, whose existence she publicly denies, with the affluent lifestyle and higher social status it brings her. Tony and Carmela's style of parenting involves anger, criticism and yelling, and they have challenging relationships with their two children: the intelligent, but rebellious Meadow (Jamie-Lynn Sigler) and underachiever Anthony Jr. ("A.J.") (Robert Iler), whose everyday teenage issues are further complicated by their eventual knowledge of their father's criminal activities and reputation.

The starring cast includes members of Tony's extended family, including his narcissistic and manipulative mother, Livia (Nancy Marchand), his aimless, histrionic older sister Janice (Aida Turturro), his crafty paternal uncle Corrado "Junior" Soprano (Dominic Chianese), who is nominal boss of the crime family following the death of then-acting boss Jackie Aprile Sr. (Michael Rispoli), and his immature and hot-headed cousin and protégé Christopher Moltisanti (Michael Imperioli).

Both Livia and Janice are scheming, treacherous, shrewd manipulators with major unaddressed psychological issues of their own. Uncle Junior is ambitious, and he is chronically frustrated that he is not boss of the family, despite being entitled to the position by old-school mob traditions regarding seniority. He feels his authority is perpetually undermined by Tony's greater influence in the organization and barely contains his seething jealousy at having to watch both his younger brother (Tony's father) and now Tony leapfrog him in the organization. As their tensions escalate, Uncle Junior employs increasingly desperate behind-the-scenes measures to solve his problems with Tony, who still idolizes his uncle and wants to retain Junior's affection and approval.

Uncle Junior and Christopher are fixtures in Tony's real family, as well as his crime family, so their actions in one realm often create further conflicts in the other. Christopher, an entitled, insecure associate who is as ambitious as he is insubordinate and incompetent, is also a chronic substance abuser. His maternal cousin Tony Blundetto (Steve Buscemi) is a well-respected DiMeo family soldier who returns after completing a lengthy prison sentence; he leaves prison committed to "going straight" (to Tony's dismay), but also has an intense violent streak.

Those in Tony's closest circle within the crime family include Silvio Dante (Steven Van Zandt), Tony's consigliere and best friend who runs the family's strip club headquarters and other businesses, Paulie "Walnuts" Gualtieri (Tony Sirico), a tough, short-tempered, aging soldier who is fiercely loyal to Tony, and Salvatore "Big Pussy" Bonpensiero (Vincent Pastore), a veteran gangster who runs an automotive body shop. Paulie "Walnuts" and "Big Pussy" (often called just "Pussy") have worked with Tony and his father. Also in Tony's criminal organization are Patsy Parisi (Dan Grimaldi), a soft-spoken soldier with a head for figures, and Furio Giunta (Federico Castelluccio), an Italian national who joins the family later in the series, who serves as Tony's enforcer and bodyguard.

Other significant characters in the crime family include Bobby "Bacala" Baccalieri (Steven R. Schirripa); Richie Aprile (David Proval); Ralph Cifaretto (Joe Pantoliano); Eugene Pontecorvo (Robert Funaro); and Vito Spatafore (Joseph R. Gannascoli). Bobby is a subordinate of Uncle Junior's whom Tony initially bullies, but later accepts into his inner circle. Ralph is a clever, ambitious 'top-earner', but his arrogant, obnoxious, disrespectful, and unpredictably violent tendencies turn Tony resentful. Richie Aprile is released from prison in season 2 and quickly makes waves. Pontecorvo is a young soldier who becomes a "made" man alongside Christopher. Vito Spatafore works his way up through the ranks to become top earner of the Aprile crew but is secretly gay.

Friends of the Soprano family include Herman "Hesh" Rabkin (Jerry Adler); Adriana La Cerva (Drea de Matteo); Rosalie Aprile (Sharon Angela); Angie Bonpensiero (Toni Kalem), along with Artie (John Ventimiglia) and Charmaine Bucco (Kathrine Narducci). Hesh is an invaluable adviser and friend to Tony, as he was when Tony's father ran things. Adriana is Christopher's loyal and long-suffering girlfriend; the two have a volatile relationship but appear destined to stay together. Christopher often ignores Adriana's advice and winds up regretting it. Rosalie is the widow of previous DiMeo boss Jackie Aprile Sr. and a very close friend of Carmela. Angie is Salvatore Bonpensiero's wife. She later goes into "business" for herself, quite successfully.

Artie and Charmaine are childhood friends of the Sopranos, and owners of the popular restaurant Vesuvio. Charmaine wishes to have no association with Tony and his crew due to fears that Tony's criminal ways will ultimately ruin everything she and Artie have achieved. Artie, however—a law-abiding, hard-working man—is drawn to his childhood friend Tony's glamorous, seemingly carefree lifestyle. Charmaine bitterly resents Artie's chronic tendency to disregard her wishes while catering to Tony's; their marriage suffers greatly as a result. Charmaine also had a brief sexual encounter with Tony (when he and Carmela had temporarily broken-up) when all four were teenagers.

John "Johnny Sack" Sacramoni (Vince Curatola), Phil Leotardo (Frank Vincent) and "Little" Carmine Lupertazzi Jr. (Ray Abruzzo) are all significant figures in the New York City–based Lupertazzi crime family, which does a lot of business with the Soprano organization. Although the Lupertazzis' and DiMeos' interests are often at odds, Tony maintains a cordial, business-like relationship with Johnny Sack, preferring to make mutually beneficial deals, not war. Johnny Sack's second-in-command and eventual successor, Phil Leotardo, is less friendly and harder for Tony to do business with. Little Carmine is the son of the family's first boss and vies for power with its other members.

== Episodes ==
Season	Episodes		Originally released	
Season	Episodes		First released	Last released
1	13		January 10, 1999	April 4, 1999
2	13		January 16, 2000	April 9, 2000
3	13		March 4, 2001	May 20, 2001
4	13		September 15, 2002	December 8, 2002
5	13		March 7, 2004	June 6, 2004
6	21	12	March 12, 2006	June 4, 2006
6	21	9	April 8, 2007	June 10, 2007

=== Season 1 (1999) ===
When Tony Soprano collapses after suffering a panic attack, he begins therapy with Dr. Jennifer Melfi. Details of Tony's upbringing—with his father's influence looming large on his development as a gangster, but more so that of Tony's mother, Livia, who is vengeful, narcissistic, and possibly psychopathic—are revealed. His complicated relationship with his wife Carmela is also explored, as well as her feelings regarding her husband's cosa nostra ties. Meadow and Anthony Jr., Tony's children, gain increasing knowledge of their father's mob dealings. Later, federal indictments are brought as a result of someone in his organization talking to the FBI.

Tony's uncle Corrado "Junior" Soprano, who controls his own crew, orders the murder of Brendan Filone and the mock execution of Christopher Moltisanti, associates of Tony's, as a reprisal for repeated hijackings of trucks under Corrado's protection. Tony defuses the situation by allowing his uncle to be installed as boss of the family (following the death of the previous boss Jackie Aprile from cancer), while Tony retains actual control of most dealings from behind the scenes. Corrado discovers the subterfuge, after talking to Livia and falling for her subtle manipulation, and he orders an attempt on Tony's life. The assassination is botched and Tony responds violently, before confronting his mother for her role in plotting his downfall; she appears to have a psychologically triggered stroke as a result. Junior is arrested by the FBI on charges related to the federal indictments before Tony gets a chance to murder him in retaliation.

=== Season 2 (2000) ===
Jackie's brother Richie Aprile is released from prison. He proves to be uncontrollable in the business arena, siding more with Junior than Tony, despite the fact that Tony is the acting boss of the family after Junior's arrest. Richie starts a relationship with Janice, Tony's sister, who has arrived from Seattle to take care of their mother. "Big Pussy" returns to New Jersey after a conspicuous absence.

Christopher Moltisanti becomes engaged to his girlfriend Adriana La Cerva, despite his past abuse. Matthew Bevilaqua and Sean Gismonte, two low-level associates dissatisfied with their perceived lack of success in the Soprano crew, try to make names for themselves by attempting to kill Christopher as a favor to Richie, even though he didn't ask them to. Their plan fails and Christopher kills Sean, but Christopher is critically wounded. He manages to recover after surgery. Tony and Big Pussy locate Matthew and kill him. A witness to the murder goes to the FBI and identifies Tony, but later retracts his statement.

Junior is placed under house arrest as he awaits trial. Richie, frustrated with Tony's authority over him, entreats Junior to have Tony killed. Junior feigns interest, then informs Tony of Richie's intentions, leaving Tony with another problem to address. However, the situation is defused unexpectedly when Janice kills Richie in a violent argument; Tony and his men conceal all evidence of the murder, and Janice returns to Seattle.

After a food poisoning incident that causes vivid dreams, Tony finally comes to terms with his suspicion that Big Pussy might be an FBI informant. He manages to search Pussy's bedroom under false pretenses and discovers damning evidence. Tony kills Pussy on board a boat (with assistance from Silvio Dante and Paulie Gualtieri), disposing of his body at sea.

=== Season 3 (2001) ===
Following the "disappearance" of Richie Aprile, the return of the ambitious Ralph Cifaretto, having spent an extended period of leisure time in Miami, marks the third season. He renews a relationship with Rosalie Aprile, the widow of Jackie Aprile Sr. With Richie assumed to have joined the Witness Protection Program, Ralph unofficially usurps control over the Aprile crew, proving to be an exceptionally dexterous earner. While Ralph's competitive merit would seemingly have him next in line to ascend to capo, his insubordination inclines Tony not to promote him and he instead gives the promotion to the less qualified but competent Gigi Cestone, causing much resentment and tension between him and Ralph.

Ralph ultimately crosses the line when, in a cocaine-induced rage, he gets into a confrontation with his pregnant girlfriend Tracee and beats her to death. This infuriates Tony, who had come to care for the girl, to the point where he violates the traditional mafia code by beating Ralph in front of the entire family. Bad blood temporarily surfaces between the two but is shortly resolved after Ralph apologizes. Cestone suffers a fatal heart attack, thereby forcing Tony to reluctantly promote Ralph to capo.

After getting arrested at the airport for stolen airplane tickets that Tony gave her, Livia is set to testify against him in court. Before that can happen, Livia dies of a stroke and Tony has to deal with his complicated feelings surrounding their relationship. Junior is diagnosed with stomach cancer; following surgery and chemotherapy, it goes into remission.

One night after work, Dr. Melfi is raped by a stranger in a parking complex. After police mishandle evidence, the suspect is released from custody without facing charges. Dr. Melfi struggles with the fallout of the assault and the notion that she could ask Tony to deal out his brand of justice, which she ultimately decides against. Meanwhile, Tony begins an affair with Gloria Trillo, who is also a patient of Dr. Melfi. Their relationship is brief and tumultuous.

Rosalie's son Jackie Aprile Jr. becomes involved with Meadow and then descends into a downward spiral of recklessness, drugs, and crime. Tony initially attempts to act as a mentor to Jackie and encourages him to stay in school, but he becomes increasingly impatient with Jackie's escalating misbehavior, particularly as Jackie's relationship with Meadow begins to become serious. Inspired by a story from Ralph about how Tony, Jackie Sr., and Silvio Dante got made, Jackie and his friends Dino Zerilli and Carlo Renzi make a similar move and attempt to rob Eugene Pontecorvo's Saturday night card game so they can gain recognition from the family.

The plan takes a turn for the worse when Jackie panics and kills the card dealer, provoking a shoot-out. Dino and Carlo are killed, but Jackie manages to escape. Tony decides to let Ralph handle the decision regarding Jackie Jr.'s punishment, but he strongly implies that he thinks Ralph should kill Jackie. Despite his role as a surrogate father, Ralph decides to have Jackie Jr. killed when other members of the crew play up how badly Jackie had disrespected him.

A.J. continues to get in trouble at school—despite success on the football team—which culminates in his expulsion and his parents considering sending him to military school. When he suffers a panic attack, his second after the one his old school failed to report, Tony realizes A.J. can't attend military school and he blames himself. Meadow is hit hard by Jackie Jr.'s death, resorting to drinking and then storming out of his funeral reception.

=== Season 4 (2002) ===
New York underboss Johnny Sack becomes enraged after learning Ralph Cifaretto joked about his wife's weight. He seeks permission from boss Carmine Lupertazzi to have Ralph killed, but is denied. Johnny orders the hit anyway. Tony receives the okay from Carmine to hit Johnny for insubordination. Junior Soprano tips Tony to use an old outfit in Providence for the work. After catching his wife eating sweets secretly instead of following her diet, Johnny Sack talks it out with her and then calls off the hit on Ralph, averting bloodshed.

Tony and Ralph invest in a racehorse named Pie-O-My, who wins several races and makes them both a great deal of money until the horse dies in a stable fire. When Ralph's 12-year-old son Justin is severely injured in an archery accident, Tony comes to believe Ralph started the stable fire himself in order to collect $200,000 in insurance money. Tony confronts Ralph and Ralph denies setting the fire. The two engage in a violent brawl, culminating in Tony strangling Ralph to death. Tony and Christopher dispose of the body and tell the rest of the crew that the likely culprit for Ralph's disappearance is Johnny Sack.

While he is leaving court, Junior is hit in the head with a boom mic and falls down several steps. Tony advises him to take advantage of the opportunity, act mentally incompetent and employ it as a ruse for not continuing the trial. When that fails, Eugene Pontecorvo intimidates a juror, resulting in a deadlocked jury, forcing the judge to declare a mistrial.

Following the death of Bobby Baccalieri's wife, Janice pursues a romantic relationship with him. Bobby is initially reluctant to move on, but after an incident with his kids and Anthony Jr. trying to summon his deceased wife's ghost, he becomes more receptive to Janice's advances.

Christopher's addiction to heroin deepens, prompting his associates and family to organize an intervention, after which he enters a drug rehabilitation center. Adriana's friend Danielle Ciccolella is revealed to be an undercover FBI agent named Deborah Ciccerone-Waldrup, who tells Adriana the only way for her to stay out of prison for cocaine distribution at her bar is to become an informant. Adriana reluctantly agrees and starts sharing information with the FBI.

Carmela, whose relationship with Tony is tense due to financial worries and Tony's infidelities, develops a mutual infatuation with Furio Giunta. Furio, incapable of breaking his personal moral code and that of the Neapolitan mafia, clandestinely returns home to Italy. After Tony's former mistress calls their home, Carmela throws Tony out. As a result, their plan to buy a beach house falls through and Tony pesters the owner until he gets his deposit back.

Anthony Jr. starts attending a new high school, with Tony suggesting he needed to pull some strings to get him in. A.J. gets a girlfriend but is intimidated by her family's wealth. Meadow initially struggles with her ex-boyfriend's death. As she considers taking a gap year or switching schools, she sees a therapist that Dr. Melfi recommended. Eventually, Meadow finds a worthwhile cause by volunteering at a law center. She gets an apartment with some roommates and starts dating again. Her relationship with Carmela becomes strained after several arguments. Both the kids take their parents' separation hard, with A.J. asking to live with his dad instead of his mom.

Tony decides to quit therapy, thinking he isn't making any progress. He thanks Dr. Melfi for all her help and they part amicably. Stuck in a deadlock over a deal with the Lupertazzi family, Tony is approached by Johnny Sack with a proposal to murder Carmine. He considers it, even after managing to reach an agreement with Carmine, but he later becomes suspicious of Johnny's intentions and turns him down.

=== Season 5 (2004) ===
A string of new characters are introduced, including Tony's cousin Tony Blundetto, who simultaneously along with other Mafiosi, is released from prison. Among the others released are former DiMeo crime family capo Michele "Feech" La Manna, Lupertazzi family capo Phil Leotardo, and semi-retired Lupertazzi consigliere Angelo Garepe. Tony offers Tony B a job, but he respectfully declines, as he is determined to lead a straight life. He initially begins to take courses to earn a degree in massage therapy and aspires to open up a massage parlor. After Carmine Lupertazzi dies of a stroke, his death leaves a vacancy for the boss of the Lupertazzi family, which will soon be fought over by underboss Johnny Sack and Carmine's son Carmine Lupertazzi Jr. After Feech proves to be an insubordinate presence, Tony arranges for him to be sent back to prison by setting him up with stolen property, violating his parole.

The war between Johnny Sack and Carmine Jr. begins when Johnny has Phil kill "Lady Shylock" Lorraine Calluzzo. Tony B's attempt to stay straight comes to a head when he gets into a brawl with his employer. Angelo, who was a good friend to Tony B in prison, and Lupertazzi capo Rusty Millio offer Tony B the job of taking out Joey Peeps in retaliation for Lorraine's death. Tony B initially declines but, desperate to earn, accepts the job. He catches Joey outside a bordello, shoots him, and quickly flees the scene. Johnny believes Tony B is involved and retaliates by having Phil and his brother Billy Leotardo kill Angelo. Tony B finds the Leotardo brothers and opens fire, killing Billy and wounding Phil.

Separated from Carmela, Tony is living at his parents' house. Carmela, the sole authority figure in the home, becomes frustrated as her rules lead A.J. to resent her so she allows him to live with his father. She has a brief relationship with Robert Wegler, A.J.'s guidance counselor; he breaks it off abruptly when he suspects that she is manipulating him to improve A.J.'s grades. Tony and Carmela reconcile; Tony promises to be more loyal and agrees to pay for a piece of real estate Carmela wishes to develop.

Tony gets Meadow's boyfriend Finn De Trolio a summer job at a construction site, which is run by Aprile crew capo Vito Spatafore. Finn comes in early one morning and catches Vito performing fellatio on a security guard. Vito tries to buddy up to Finn so that he keeps quiet, but Finn soon quits the job out of fear.

After covering up a murder that occurred at The Crazy Horse, Adriana is arrested and pressured by the FBI to start sharing more relevant information about the family to avoid being charged as an accomplice. Rather than taking the risk of wearing a wire, Adriana confesses to Christopher and tries to persuade him to co-operate and become an informant against Tony. A grief-stricken Christopher instead informs Tony, who has Silvio pick up Adriana under the pretense of taking her to the hospital to see Christopher after he supposedly attempted suicide, but Silvio instead drives her out to the woods and executes her. Adriana's betrayal and subsequent execution are too much for Christopher to handle and he briefly relapses into drug use to deal with the pain.

Phil Leotardo and his henchmen beat Benny Fazio while trying to acquire the whereabouts of Tony B; Phil also threatens to have Christopher taken out if Tony B's whereabouts are not disclosed soon. To pacify New York and give his cousin a painless death, Tony tracks Tony B to their Uncle Pat's farm and executes him. Phil is furious that he did not get the opportunity to do it himself. Tony and Johnny meet at Johnny's house in a reconciliatory manner, but Johnny is arrested by Federal agents, while Tony escapes.

=== Season 6 (2006–07) ===
Part I

A senile and confused Uncle Junior shoots Tony one night in his house. Rendered comatose, Tony dreams he is a salesman on a business trip who mistakenly exchanges his briefcase and identification with a man named Kevin Finnerty. Tony's recovery from the shooting changes his outlook and he tries to mend his ways. However, he is faced with more problems in his business and personal life. Eugene Pontecorvo makes a request to Tony to get out of the life, which is subsequently denied, and coupled with the stress and problems with his home life, hangs himself in his garage.

Once Tony is out of the hospital, Johnny Sack's daughter is about to get married and the Soprano family attends the wedding. Johnny is approved to leave prison for six hours to attend, but he is humiliated by having to pay for the metal detectors and the presence of U.S. marshals at the event. As his daughter is about to drive away with her husband, Johnny's time expires and the marshals publicly take him back to prison. In a moment of weakness and despair, Johnny bursts into tears as he is handcuffed, dismantling the remaining respect his and Tony's crews had for him.

Vito Spatafore is outed as gay after running into a friend making collections at a New York gay nightclub. The rumor spreads quickly, and once word gets to Meadow that everyone else knows, she tells Tony and Carmela about the incident between Finn and Vito. Finn is forced to tell Tony's entire crew what happened with Vito and the security guard at the construction site, solidifying their suspicions about Vito's sexuality. Tony is urged to deal with the problem by the intensely homophobic Phil Leotardo, now the acting boss of New York, whose cousin is married to Vito.

Once Vito is confronted by other members of the crew, he flees to a New Hampshire town, where he poses as an author and starts a romantic relationship with a male cook at a local diner. Despite finally living an authentic life, Vito misses the benefits his old job afforded him, so he eventually returns to New Jersey. He asks Tony to allow him to return to work, making a case that he could bring in a lot of money in Atlantic City. Vito visits his wife and children and continues to maintain that he is not a homosexual.

Tony mulls over the decision to let him back into the crew, as well as whether to let him live. When Tony fails to act, Phil intervenes and brutally executes Vito. When one of the members of the New York family, Fat Dom Gamiello, pays a visit to the Jersey office and won't stop making jokes about Vito and his death, Silvio Dante and Carlo Gervasi kill Fat Dom out of anger at his disrespect. Once more, it appears that the families are on the verge of an all-out war.

During the first half of the season, Christopher and Little Carmine head to Los Angeles in an ultimately unsuccessful attempt to try to sign Ben Kingsley for a slasher film they are trying to make called Cleaver, which is a mix of The Godfather and Saw. While in Los Angeles, Chris goes back to drinking and using cocaine for a short period, and he robs famous actress Lauren Bacall. Christopher has an affair with realtor Julianna Skiff, a woman Tony was romantically interested in, which strains his relationship with Tony. When Christopher's new girlfriend Kelli Lombardo accidentally gets pregnant, they decide to get married in Atlantic City.

Part II

Christopher's film Cleaver is released, and Carmela is upset that the boss character, who is based on Tony, sleeps with his underling's girlfriend, who seems to be based on Christopher's ex Adriana. Tony's negative portrayal in the movie further strains his relationship with Christopher. Tony considers killing several of his associates for relatively minor infractions, including Paulie Gualtieri. Christopher is unable to thrive in the business because of his addiction, deflecting his problems by relapsing and killing his friend from Narcotics Anonymous and co-writer of Cleaver, J. T. Dolan. He is then seriously injured in a car accident while driving under the influence of narcotics. Tony, the sole passenger, finally loses patience with Christopher's failings and suffocates him. He later tries to justify his actions by bringing up the infant car seat that was impaled by a branch in the accident, implying that Christopher was a danger to his new daughter.

A.J. is dumped by his fiancée and he slips into depression, culminating in a suicide attempt in the backyard pool. After spending some time in a mental institution, he returns home but is still haunted by existential questions and he ultimately decides to join the army. Tony and Carmela come up with a movie set job to keep him from enlisting, with Tony promising he would one day finance A.J.'s nightclub. Dr. Melfi is convinced by colleagues that Tony is making no progress and may even be using talk therapy to excuse his own actions and as practice for manipulative behavior. She drops him as a patient, and he fully quits therapy.

Johnny dies from lung cancer while imprisoned, and Phil officially takes over the Lupertazzi family after having his rivals killed. Phil renews his past feud with Tony and refuses to compromise with New Jersey on a garbage deal. When Tony assaults a Lupertazzi soldier for harassing Meadow while she was on a date, Phil initiates open war on the Soprano crew. He orders the executions of Bobby Baccalieri, who is shot to death; Silvio Dante, who ends up comatose; and Tony, who goes into hiding. Since Phil won't back down until Tony is executed, a deal is eventually brokered whereby the rest of the Lupertazzi family agrees to ignore the hit on Tony, allowing him to go after Phil without fear of repercussions. FBI agent Dwight Harris informs Tony of Phil's location, allowing Tony to have him killed.

Tony starts suspecting that Carlo Gervasi, a capo from New Jersey, has become an informant in an attempt to help out his son, who has recently been arrested for dealing ecstasy. Tony meets his lawyer, who informs him that subpoenas are being delivered to New Jersey and New York crews alike. Tony visits Uncle Junior for the first time since the shooting, and although he does not forgive him, he comes to understand the full extent of his dementia and that his uncle likely did not intend to kill him.

Tony plans to have a quiet dinner at a diner with his family. As Meadow arrives at the door, the camera cuts to Tony. A bell signals the door opening, Tony looks up, and the show smash cuts to black; after a few seconds, the credits roll in silence.

== Influence and legacy ==
=== Ratings ===
The Sopranos was a major ratings success throughout its run, despite being aired on premium cable network HBO, which had been available in significantly fewer American homes than regular networks. The show frequently attracted equal or larger audiences than most popular network shows of the time. The Nielsen ratings for the first four seasons are not entirely accurate, as Nielsen reported aggregate numbers for cable networks prior to January 2004, meaning that people who were included in the ratings estimates were actually watching HBO channels other than the main one on which The Sopranos aired.

Season	Originally aired	Nielsen ratings (in millions)			Time slot
Season	Originally aired	Season premiere	Season finale	Season average	Time slot
1	January 10 – April 4, 1999	3.45	5.22	3.46	Sunday; 9:00 pm
2	January 16 – April 9, 2000	7.64	8.97	6.62	Sunday; 9:00 pm
3	March 4 – May 20, 2001	11.26	9.46	8.87	Sunday; 9:00 pm
4	September 15 – December 8, 2002	13.43	12.48	10.99	Sunday; 9:00 pm
5	March 7 – June 6, 2004	12.14	10.98	9.80	Sunday; 9:00 pm
6A	March 12 – June 4, 2006	9.47	8.90	8.60	Sunday; 9:00 pm
6B	April 8 – June 10, 2007	7.66	11.90	8.23	Sunday; 9:00 pm

=== Critical response ===
Critical response of The Sopranos
Season	Rotten Tomatoes	Metacritic
1	98% (51 reviews)	88 (20 reviews)
2	94% (18 reviews)	97 (24 reviews)
3	100% (13 reviews)	97 (25 reviews)
4	92% (12 reviews)	97 (3 reviews)
5	93% (14 reviews)	86 (3 reviews)
6	Part I: 89% (37 reviews); Part II: 84% (31 reviews)	96 (18 reviews)

The Sopranos has been hailed by many critics as the greatest and most groundbreaking television series of all time. (Note: Attributed to multiple references:) The writing, acting, and directing have often been singled out for praise. The show has also received considerable attention from critics and journalists for its technical merit, music selections, cinematography, and willingness to deal with difficult and controversial subjects including crime, family, gender roles, mental illness, and American and Italian-American culture.

The Sopranos is credited for creating a new era in the mafia genre deviating from the traditional dramatized image of the gangster in favor of a simpler, more accurate reflection of ordinary day-to-day mob life in a suburb. The series sheds light on Italian family dynamics through the depiction of Tony's tumultuous relationship with his mother. Edie Falco's character Carmela Soprano is praised in Kristyn Gorton's essay "Why I Love Carmela Soprano" for challenging Italian-American gender roles. New Yorker editor David Remnick described The Sopranos as mirroring the "mindless commerce and consumption" of modern America. The series has an overall rating of 92 percent on Rotten Tomatoes, and 94 out of 100 on Metacritic.

The Sopranos has been called "perhaps the greatest pop-culture masterpiece of its day" by Vanity Fair contributor Peter Biskind. Remnick called the show "the richest achievement in the history of television." In 2002, TV Guide ranked The Sopranos fifth on their list of the "Top 50 TV Shows of All Time", while the series was only in its fourth season. In 2007, Channel 4 (UK) named The Sopranos the greatest television series of all time.

The first season of the series received overwhelmingly positive reviews. Following its initial airing in 1999, The New York Times stated, "[The Sopranos] just may be the greatest work of American popular culture of the last quarter century." In 2007, Roger Holland of PopMatters wrote, "the debut season of The Sopranos remains the crowning achievement of American television."

Time Out New York's Andrew Johnston had high praise for the series, stating: "Together, Chase and his fellow writers (including Terence Winter and Mad Men creator Matthew Weiner) produced the legendary Great American Novel, and it's 86 episodes long." Johnston asserted the preeminence of The Sopranos as opposed to The Wire and Deadwood in a debate with television critics Alan Sepinwall and Matt Zoller Seitz, both of whom would later include The Sopranos in their 2016 book titled TV (The Book) as the 2nd greatest American television series of all time, behind only The Simpsons and ahead of The Wire, with Seitz considering the show's ending to be the greatest ending for any television show.

In November and December 2009, many television critics named The Sopranos the best series of the decade and all time in articles summarizing the decade in television. In numbered lists over the best television programs, The Sopranos frequently ranked first or second, almost always competing with The Wire. In 2013, TV Guide ranked The Sopranos No. 2 in its list of The 60 Greatest Dramas of All Time, In the same year, the Writers Guild of America named it the best-written television series of all time and TV Guide ranked it as the greatest show of all time.

A 2015 The Hollywood Reporter survey of 2,800 actors, producers, directors, and other industry people named The Sopranos as their #6 favorite show. In 2016 and 2022, Rolling Stone ranked it first on the magazine's list of 100 Greatest TV Shows of All Time. In September 2019, The Guardian ranked the show first on its list of the 100 best TV shows of the 21st century, stating that it "hastened TV's transformation into a medium where intelligence, experimentation and depth were treasured" and describing it as "something to aspire to" for anyone currently making TV. In 2021, Empire ranked The Sopranos at number one on their list of The 100 Greatest TV Shows of All Time. In 2023, Variety ranked The Sopranos #3 on its own list of the 100 greatest TV shows of all time. Also in 2023, The Sopranos was ranked as the second best TV series in the last 25 years by critics in a poll conveyed by Rotten Tomatoes.

Certain episodes have frequently been singled out by critics as the show's best. These include the pilot, titled "The Sopranos", "College" and "I Dream of Jeannie Cusamano" of the first season; "The Knight in White Satin Armor" and "Funhouse" of the second; "Employee of the Month", "Pine Barrens" and "Amour Fou" of the third; "Whoever Did This" and "Whitecaps" of the fourth; "Irregular Around the Margins" and "Long Term Parking" of the fifth and "Members Only", "Join the Club", "Kennedy and Heidi", "The Second Coming", "The Blue Comet" and "Made in America" of the sixth season.

Chase's decision to end the last episode abruptly with just a black screen was controversial. While Chase has insisted that it was not his intention to stir controversy, the ambiguity over the ending and question of whether Tony was murdered has continued for years after the finale's original broadcast and has spawned numerous websites devoted to finding out his true intention.

=== Awards and nominations ===
The Sopranos won and was nominated for many awards throughout its original broadcast. It was nominated for the Primetime Emmy Award for Outstanding Drama Series in every year it was eligible and was the first cable TV series to receive a nomination for the award. After being nominated for and losing the award in 1999, 2000, 2001, and 2003 (losing the first time to The Practice and the last three to The West Wing), The Sopranos won the award in 2004, and again in 2007. Its 2004 win made The Sopranos the first series on a cable network to win the award, while its 2007 win made the show the first drama series since Upstairs, Downstairs in 1977 to win the award after it had finished airing. The show earned 21 nominations for Outstanding Writing for a Drama Series and won the award six times, with creator David Chase receiving three awards. The Sopranos won American Film Institute's Drama Series of the Year Award in 2001.

The Sopranos won at least one Emmy Award for acting in every eligible year except 2006 and 2007. James Gandolfini and Edie Falco were each nominated six times for Outstanding Lead Actor and Actress, respectively, both winning a total of three awards. Joe Pantoliano won an Emmy for Outstanding Supporting Actor in 2003, and Michael Imperioli and Drea de Matteo also won Emmys in 2004 for their supporting roles on the show. Other actors who have received Emmy nominations for the series include Lorraine Bracco (in the Lead Actress and Supporting Actress categories), Dominic Chianese, Nancy Marchand, Aida Turturro, Tim Daly, John Heard, Annabella Sciorra and Steve Buscemi, who was also nominated for directing the episode "Pine Barrens".

In 1999 and 2000, The Sopranos earned two consecutive George Foster Peabody Awards. Only two other series have won the award in consecutive years: Northern Exposure (1991 and 1992) and The West Wing (1999 and 2000). The show also received numerous nominations at the Golden Globe Awards (winning the award for Best Drama Series in 2000) and the major guild awards (Directors, Producers, Writers, and Actors).

In 2001, the American Psychoanalytic Association presented the producers and writers with an award for "the artistic depiction of psychoanalysis and psychoanalytic psychotherapy" and also presented Lorraine Bracco with an award for creating "the most credible psychoanalyst ever to appear in the cinema or on television."

=== Influence on television industry ===
The Sopranos has been characterized by critics as one of the most influential artistic works of the 2000s and has been cited as helping to turn serial television into a legitimate art form on the same level as feature films, literature, and theater. Time editor James Poniewozik wrote in 2007, "This mafia saga showed just how complex and involving TV storytelling could be, inspiring an explosion of ambitious dramas on cable and off."

Maureen Ryan of PopMatters described The Sopranos as the most influential television drama ever. "No one-hour drama series has had a bigger impact on how stories are told on the small screen, or more influence on what kind of fare we've been offered by an ever-growing array of television networks."

Hal Boedeker stated in PopMatters in 2007 that the series was "widely influential for revealing that cable would accommodate complex series about dark characters. The Sopranos ushered in Six Feet Under, The Shield, Rescue Me, and Big Love." Breaking Bad creator Vince Gilligan said in 2013 shortly after Gandolfini's death, "Without Tony Soprano, there would be no Walter White."

Weiner said that when he became a writer for The Sopranos after having written the Mad Men pilot, "Whatever I had intended [Mad Men] to be ... was very different after seeing how seriously David Chase took human behavior. Real human behavior", giving "Maidenform" and how Peggy Olson's baby affects her as examples.

The series helped establish HBO as producers of critically acclaimed and commercially successful original television series. Michael Flaherty of The Hollywood Reporter has stated that The Sopranos "helped launch [HBO's] reputation as a destination for talent looking for cutting-edge original series work."

=== Depiction of stereotypes ===
The show has frequently been accused of perpetuating negative stereotypes about Italian Americans. Several major organizations have voiced their concern that The Sopranos presents a very distorted and harmful stereotype of Italian Americans and their cultural values, including the National Italian American Foundation, Order Sons of Italy in America, Unico National, and the Italic Institute of America.

In 2000, officials in Essex County, New Jersey, denied producers permission to film scenes in the South Mountain Reservation, which is county-owned property, by Essex County, New Jersey Executive James Treffinger, who argued that the show depicts Italian Americans "in stereotypical fashion". In 2002, organizers of the New York City Columbus Day Parade won an injunction preventing Mayor Michael Bloomberg from inviting cast members of The Sopranos to participate in the parade.

Fairleigh Dickinson University's PublicMind conducted a national survey in August 2001 that polled 800 people, out of which 37% said that they watched the show regularly, and 65% of this group (192 people, or 24% of the total) disagreed that the show negatively portrayed Italian Americans. Professor William Roberts, who was associated with the poll, said that "The show's inflated image of organized crime casts a shadow over both the state [of New Jersey] and its Italian American community."

He further stated "The show helped to perpetuate one of the more problematic and stereotypical images of Italian Americans. Both Italian and Italian American cultures have much more diverse and interesting heritages than the American public generally realizes." Humanities professor Camille Paglia, herself an Italian American, has spoken negatively about The Sopranos, arguing that its depiction of Italian Americans was inaccurate, inauthentic, and dated.

Chase has defended his show, saying that "It is not meant to stereotype all Italian Americans, only to depict a small criminal subculture".

=== Parodies and commercials ===
Actors from The Sopranos have reprised their roles, or at the very least parodied their roles, in various other media. Tony Sirico and Steve Schirripa appear in two separate Muppet-related Christmas specials, A Muppets Christmas: Letters to Santa and Elmo's Christmas Countdown, parodying their roles on The Sopranos. Sirico also appeared in a series of commercials for Denny's in-character as Paulie Gualtieri, a nod to the restaurant chain's mention in "Pine Barrens". James Gandolfini appeared on Weekend Update as a "New Jersey Resident" on the October 2, 2004, episode of Saturday Night Live to comment on the recent resignation of New Jersey governor Jim McGreevey. Gandolfini's character went unnamed, and hosts Tina Fey and Amy Poehler insisted at the segment's conclusion that he was "unidentified", but the character was clearly meant to be Tony Soprano.

==== 2022 Chevrolet commercial ====
Jamie-Lynn Sigler and Robert Iler reprised their roles as Meadow and A.J. Soprano in a Chevrolet television commercial initially broadcast in 2022 during Super Bowl LVI. David Chase directed the commercial and treated it as a continuation of The Sopranos story. At Chase's insistence, former Sopranos director of photography Phil Abraham performed the filming. The ad recreates the opening-title sequence of The Sopranos, with Meadow driving a Silverado EV (as opposed to Tony's Chevrolet Suburban) and meeting A.J. at Bahrs Landing, featured in The Many Saints of Newark. Along the way, she passes some Sopranos landmarks including Satriale's. Chase wanted the commercial to continue the intrigue surrounding The Sopranos finale: besides the visual allusion to the episode with Meadow's parking, Chase intentionally left open why Meadow and A.J. were at the restaurant and who they could be meeting there.

=== Reboot chances ===
In an interview with The Independent journalist Annabel Nugent in February 2026, Sopranos regulars Michael Imperioli and Steve Schirripa conceded that James Gandolfini's death in 2013 ended the chance for a Sopranos reboot series.

== Merchandise ==
=== Home media ===
The first four seasons of The Sopranos were released on VHS in five-volume box sets which lack bonus material.

All six Sopranos seasons were released as DVD box sets, with the sixth season released in two parts. A complete series box set was released in 2008.

The sixth season was released on Blu-ray Disc and HD DVD in 2006 and 2007. The first season was released on Blu-ray in 2009. A complete series box set was released in 2014. The entire series is set to be released on 4K Blu-ray on December 8, 2026.

Box set	Release dates			Episodes	Special features
Box set	Region 1	Region 2	Region 4	Episodes	Special features
The Complete First Season	December 12, 2000: VHS; DVD November 24, 2009 Blu-ray	November 24, 2003	April 19, 2001: Digipak September 29, 2010 (Blu-ray)	1 – 13	List: A 77-minute interview with series creator David Chase, conducted by film historian and director Peter Bogdanovich.; "Family Life" featurette.; "Meet Tony Soprano" featurette.; Cast and crew biographies; One audio commentary by David Chase and Peter Bogdanovich for the pilot episode, "The Sopranos".
The Complete Second Season	November 6, 2001: VHS; DVD	November 24, 2003	September 3, 2001 (Digipak)	14 – 26	List: "The Real Deal" featurette.; "A Sit Down With Tony Soprano" featurette.; Cast and crew biographies; Four audio commentaries by crew members for the episodes "Commendatori", "From Where to Eternity", "The Knight in White Satin Armor", and "Funhouse".
The Complete Third Season	August 27, 2002: VHS; DVD	November 24, 2003	October 4, 2002 (Digipak)	27 – 39	List: "A Day On The Set Of The Sopranos" featurette.; Cast and crew biographies; Three audio commentaries by crew members for the episodes "The Telltale Moozadell", "Pine Barrens", and "Amour Fou".
The Complete Fourth Season	October 28, 2003: VHS; DVD	November 3, 2003	December 3, 2003 (Digipak)	40 – 52	List: Episodic previews and recaps.; Cast and crew biographies.; Four audio commentaries by crew members for the episodes "The Weight", "Everybody Hurts", "Whoever Did This", and "Whitecaps".
The Complete Fifth Season	June 7, 2005: DVD	June 20, 2005	August 16, 2005 (Digipak)	53 – 65	List: Five audio commentaries by cast and crew members for the episodes "All Happy Families...", "Sentimental Education", "In Camelot", "Cold Cuts", and "Long Term Parking".
Season Six, Part I	November 7, 2006: DVD December 19, 2006; HD DVD; Blu-ray	November 27, 2006	March 7, 2007	66 – 77	List: Four audio commentaries by cast and crew members for the episodes "Join the Club", "Luxury Lounge", "The Ride", and "Kaisha".
Season Six, Part II	October 23, 2007: DVD; HD DVD; Blu-ray	November 19, 2007	January 31, 2008	78 – 86	List: "Making Cleaver: Behind the scenes of Christopher's horror film" featurette.; "The Music of The Sopranos" – Creator David Chase, cast, and crew discuss the songs from the show.; Four audio commentaries by cast members for the episodes "Soprano Home Movies", "Remember When", "The Second Coming", and "The Blue Comet".
The Complete Series	November 11, 2008: DVD November 4, 2014 Blu-ray	November 24, 2008	December 12, 2008: (Photo Book, DVD) October 1, 2014 (Blu-ray) August 27, 2014 (15th Anniversary Photo Book Blu-ray)	1 – 86	List: Includes all special features from the previously released box-sets.; Never before seen scenes from all six seasons.; Exclusive interviews with David Chase conducted by actor Alec Baldwin.; Supper with The Sopranos: Two sit-down dinners with the cast and crew of the show as they discuss the series finale.; Lost scenes from all six seasons of The Sopranos.; Panel Center Seminar: Discussions featuring "whacked" characters.; Extra Gravy: Spoofs and Parodies, including The Simpsons and Saturday Night Live.

=== Companion books ===
Three companion books, written by Allen Rucker, were published during The Sopranos' run:

- The Sopranos: A Family History (2000) discusses the history of the fictional crime family and Tony Soprano's childhood, while providing photos, information about the Sopranos cast, and a synopsis of the show's first two seasons. Second and third editions of the book were later released, which provide updates through the show's third and fourth seasons, respectively.
- The Sopranos Family Cookbook (As Compiled by Artie Bucco) (2002) features Southern Italian recipes (from cookbook author Michele Scicolone), photos, and additional lore from the series.
- Entertaining with the Sopranos (As Compiled by Carmela Soprano) (2006) features Neapolitan-based recipes (from Michele Scicolone) and "Soprano-approved tips" on "picking the ideal location, choosing tasteful decorations, whipping up the best drinks, and selecting the right music."

On September 17, 2020, Michael Imperioli and Steve Schirripa signed a deal with HarperCollins book imprint William Morrow and Company to write an oral history of the show; the book, titled Woke Up This Morning: The Definitive Oral History of The Sopranos, was released on November 2, 2021.

=== Soundtracks ===
Two official soundtrack compilations were released featuring music used in The Sopranos:

- The Sopranos: Music from the HBO Original Series (1999) contains music selections from the show's first two seasons.
- The Sopranos: Peppers & Eggs – Music from the HBO Original Series (2001) contains music selections and character dialogue from the show's first three seasons.

=== Video game and pinball ===
A video game based on the series, titled The Sopranos: Road to Respect, was developed by 7 Studios and released by THQ for the PlayStation 2 in November 2006. The game features the voices and likenesses of key Sopranos cast members.

In 2005, Stern Pinball released a Sopranos pinball machine designed by George Gomez.

=== Podcasts ===
Several cast members of The Sopranos have started podcasts regarding the series. Michael Imperioli and Steve Schirripa began hosting a podcast called Talking Sopranos on April 6, 2020, where the two provide inside info as they follow The Sopranos series episode-by-episode and interview cast and crew from the series. By September 2020, the podcast had reached over five million downloads. In May 2021, the podcast won a Webby Award for Best Television & Film Podcast by method of "People's Voice Winner".

Drea de Matteo and Chris Kushner began hosting a re-watch podcast on March 13, 2020, called Made Women; in July, the podcast was retooled and renamed Gangster Goddess Broad-Cast.

== Film ==
In March 2018, New Line Cinema announced that they had purchased a film detailing The Sopranos background story, set in the 1960s and '70s during, and in the wake of, the Newark riots. The 2021 film, The Many Saints of Newark, was written by David Chase and Lawrence Konner and directed by Alan Taylor. Alessandro Nivola was cast in the film as Christopher Moltisanti's father Dickie, and Michael Gandolfini, James Gandolfini's son, as the younger version of Tony Soprano. Vera Farmiga, Jon Bernthal, Ray Liotta, Corey Stoll, Billy Magnussen and John Magaro are other cast members.

The film was initially scheduled to be released on September 25, 2020, however, the film's release was delayed multiple times due to the COVID-19 pandemic in the United States; it was released on October 1, 2021, in theaters and on HBO Max.

Chase has expressed interest in producing a sequel to The Many Saints of Newark that follows Tony Soprano in his 20s, provided he could collaborate with former Sopranos writer Terence Winter. Upon hearing this, Winter replied he would do it "in a heartbeat. Absolutely."

== See also ==
- List of Primetime Emmy Awards received by HBO
- Wise Guy: David Chase and the Sopranos – 2024 American documentary film
