= Amour Fou (The Sopranos) =

- The Sopranos episode
- Episode no.: Season 3 Episode 12
- Directed by: Tim Van Patten
- Story by: David Chase
- Teleplay by: Frank Renzulli
- Cinematography by: Alik Sakharov
- Production code: 312
- Original air date: May 13, 2001
- Running time: 60 minutes

Episode chronology
← Previous "Pine Barrens"	Next → "Army of One"
- The Sopranos season 3

"Amour Fou" is the 38th episode of the HBO original series The Sopranos and the 12th of the show's third season. Its teleplay was written by Frank Renzulli from a story idea by series creator, David Chase. It was directed by Tim Van Patten and originally aired on May 13, 2001.

== Starring ==
- James Gandolfini as Tony Soprano
- Lorraine Bracco as Dr. Jennifer Melfi
- Edie Falco as Carmela Soprano
- Michael Imperioli as Christopher Moltisanti
- Dominic Chianese as Corrado Soprano, Jr. *
- Steven Van Zandt as Silvio Dante
- Tony Sirico as Paulie Gualtieri *
- Jamie-Lynn Sigler as Meadow Soprano
- Robert Iler as Anthony Soprano, Jr. *
- Drea de Matteo as Adriana La Cerva *
- Aida Turturro as Janice Soprano *
- Federico Castelluccio as Furio Giunta
- Robert Funaro as Eugene Pontecorvo
- Joe Pantoliano as Ralph Cifaretto

* = credit only

=== Guest starring ===
- Sharon Angela as Rosalie Aprile
- Jason Cerbone as Jackie Aprile, Jr.
- Louis Crugnali as Carlo Renzi
- Andrew Davoli as Dino Zerilli
- Dan Grimaldi as Patsy Parisi
- Toni Kalem as Angie Bonpensiero
- Richard Maldone as Ally Boy Barese
- Paul Mazursky as Sunshine
- Annabella Sciorra as Gloria Trillo
- Nick Tarabay as Matush Gia
- Maureen Van Zandt as Gabriella Dante
- Isaach De Bankolé as Father Obosi
- Anthony Zayas as Cholo #1
- Freddy Martinez as Cholo #2
- Cesar de Leon as Cholo #3

== Synopsis ==
Carmela and Meadow are visiting the Brooklyn Museum when Carmela has to go to the restroom to use a tampon. She has some alarming symptoms and fears she has ovarian cancer or is pregnant. When she comes back, she is brought to tears upon seeing Jusepe de Ribera's painting The Holy Family with Saints Anne and Catherine of Alexandria. Watching something sentimental on television, she begins to cry and is unnerved when she realizes it is only a commercial for dog food. She takes confession with a priest who tells her to learn to live only on what the "good part" of her husband earns and to forgo the rest. On his advice, she sees an OB-GYN, who tells her that she does not have cancer, but rather a thyroid problem.

Tony continues to see Gloria, even as her erratic behavior continues. Dr. Melfi uses the term "amour fou" (crazy love). Gloria happens to meet Carmela at the Mercedes dealership and gives her a drive home while eliciting information from her. When Tony discovers this, he furiously breaks up with her. Gloria phones him, sobbing uncontrollably; he goes to her home and gently explains again that he is breaking up with her. She threatens to tell Carmela and Meadow about their affair, and when Tony starts strangling her in response, she urges him to kill her. He lets her go but threatens her as he leaves. Later, he sends Patsy, who goes on a test drive with her, pulls over on a rural road, holds her at gunpoint, and tells her that if she ever contacts Tony or his family again, he — not Tony — will kill her.

Jackie Jr. and his friends Carlo and Dino decide to rob Eugene's poker game, after Ralphie tells them how Tony and Jackie's father gained recognition for a similar heist. The dealer, Sunshine, heckles the would-be robbers and is fatally shot by a panicking Jackie. In the ensuing firefight, Furio is shot in the thigh, and Carlo is killed. Jackie and Dino find that their wheelman, Matush, has fled and left them at the mercy of Christopher and Albert. Jackie carjacks a vehicle and flees, abandoning Dino, who is shot dead.

Christopher furiously expresses his desire to kill Jackie Jr., but Tony forbids it, enraging Christopher. The next morning, Ralphie meets with Tony to discuss how to deal with Jackie. Tony says Ralphie is responsible, but his advice is ambiguous. Ralphie is full of doubt: he blames the late Jackie Sr. for "spoiling" his son and wants to give Jackie a "pass", but Tony vaguely leaves the final decision to Ralph's discretion. Tony gives Ralph back the pistol he confiscated from Jackie. Ralph embraces Tony and leaves. Outside, he pauses, perplexed. At home, Ralph, visibly annoyed, tries to comfort Rosalie, who is distraught at her son's disappearance.

== Deceased ==
- "Sunshine": a card dealer for the mob who was shot during the poker robbery by Jackie Jr.
- Carlo Renzi: shot by Christopher in the head during the poker robbery.
- Dino Zerilli: shot in the head outside of the Aprile hangout by Christopher and Albert Barese.

== Final appearances ==
- Gloria Trillo: Tony's girlfriend. She would later appear in a dream in "Everybody Hurts" and "The Test Dream".

== Title reference ==
- The translation from French is "crazy love", a term Dr. Melfi uses to describe the conflicted relationship between Tony and Gloria. Tony later mispronounces it "Our mofo."

== Production ==
- On the commentary on the season three DVD, David Chase affirms that this episode features "the biggest gunfight we ever shot."
- The tiny shell casings which strike the pavement after Chris executes Dino outside the card game were added into the scene in post-production using CGI.

== Other cultural references ==
- Jackie and Dino are watching the famous "leg cross" scene from the film Basic Instinct on television.
- Tony tells Dr. Melfi that Gloria reminds him of a princess in a Spanish painting, a "Goyim." He means to refer to Goya.
- Tony calls Gloria's Buddha statue "a regular Captain Marvel".
- Jackie and Dino are also watching a documentary on Vanilla Ice.
- Gloria brandishing a corkscrew as a weapon against Tony could be a reference to Gandolfini's role in True Romance, where a female character similarly uses a corkscrew against Gandolfini.
- During dinner with Gabriella, Carmela, and Angie, Rosalie mentioned the Clinton–Lewinsky scandal while discussing Meadow and Jackie's breakup

== Music ==
- This episode opens with the same music that closes the previous episode, "Pine Barrens" – the aria "Sposa son disprezzata" from the opera Bajazet by Antonio Vivaldi, sung by Cecilia Bartoli.
- "Return To Me (Ritorna a me)" by Dean Martin is playing while Ralphie tells Jackie Jr. and Dino about when Tony and Jackie Sr. robbed Feech LaManna's card game.
- The Bangles' song, "Walk Like an Egyptian", is playing in the Ooh-Fa Pizza & Restaurant, a regular hangout of Chris, when he sits down with Jackie and Dino.
- The music played when Ralph returns home to comfort Rosalie is a Bob Dylan cover of a Carmen Lombardo and Danny Di Minno song, "Return To Me", previously released as a single by Dean Martin. It was recorded for this episode at Dylan's request, as he is an admitted fan of the series.
- While Tony Soprano is with Gloria, she turns on the song "Affection" by Little Steven and the Lost Boys. The same song is played over the end credits. Lead singer Steve Van Zandt plays Silvio Dante on the show.

== Awards ==
James Gandolfini won his second Primetime Emmy Award for Outstanding Lead Actor in a Drama Series for his performance in this episode. Annabella Sciorra was nominated for the Primetime Emmy Award for Outstanding Guest Actress in a Drama Series for her performance.
