= Alma Cuervo =

American stage actress and singer

- Cuervo in a.k.a. Pablo (1984)
- Born: August 13, 1951 (age 75); Tampa, Florida, U.S.
- Education: Tulane University
- Occupations: Actress, singer

Alma Cuervo (born August 13, 1951) is an American stage actress and singer, who has also performed in film and television.

== Career ==
Born in Tampa, Florida on August 13, 1951, Cuervo is a graduate of Tulane University. She starred in the role of Madame Morrible in the first national tour of Wicked. She replaced Carole Shelley on March 8, 2006. She left the role on January 14, 2007, to star in the first national tour of My Fair Lady. She was replaced by Barbara Tirrell. After My Fair Lady, she returned to the tour of Wicked from November 14, 2007, through July 14, 2008, and was replaced by Myra Lucretia Taylor. In 2011, she originated the role of Hilary in Susan Charlotte's The Shoemaker, directed by Antony Marsellis and co-starring Danny Aiello and Lucy Devito. In 2015, she originated the role of Gloria Estefan's grandmother, Consuelo, in the Broadway musical On Your Feet! Other theater credits include Beauty and the Beast, Cabaret, Dancing at Lughnasa, Once in a Lifetime and as Ida Straus in the Tony Award-winning musical, Titanic (original cast). She also played Cinderella’s Stepmother/Granny/Giant’s Wife in Into the Woods in a 25th anniversary co-production between Baltimore's Center Stage and Westport Country Playhouse. In July 2023 she originated the role of Ana Sofia in the Leeds Playhouse production of In Dreams, a new musical written by David West Read (Schitt’s Creek, & Juliet) and directed by Luke Sheppard (& Juliet, In The Heights), based on the music of Roy Orbison.

== Stage credits ==
=== Broadway credits ===
Year	Production	Role	Location	Category
1978	Once in a Lifetime	Coat Check Girl, Bridesmaid	Circle in the Square Theatre	Broadway
1979	Bedroom Farce	Susannah replacement	Brooks Atkinson Theatre	Broadway
1980	Censored Scenes From King Kong	Deborah	Princess Theatre	Broadway
1982	Is there life after high school?	Performer	Ethel Barrymore Theatre	Broadway
1984	Quilters	Daughter	Jack Lawrence Theatre	Broadway
1987	A Month of Sundays	Nurse Wilson, Julia understudy	Ritz Theatre	Broadway
1989	Ghetto	Ooma	Circle in the Square Theatre	Broadway
1989	The Secret Rapture	Isobel Glass, Marion French understudy	Ethel Barrymore Theatre	Broadway
1989-1990	The Heidi Chronicles	Fran, Molly, Betsy, April replacement	Plymouth Theatre	Broadway
1991-1992	Dancing at Lughnasa	Kate understudy	Plymouth Theatre	Broadway
1997-1999	Titanic	Ida Straus, 3rd Class Passenger	Lunt-Fontanne Theatre	Broadway
2003	Cabaret	Fraulein Schneider	Studio 54	Broadway
2004-2005	Beauty and the Beast	Mrs. Potts replacement	Lunt-Fontanne Theatre	Broadway
2010-2011	Women on the Verge of a Nervous Breakdown	Woman in Cinema, Ivan's Concierge, Magistrate 2	Belasco Theatre	Broadway
2015-2017	On Your Feet!	Consuelo	Marquis Theatre	Broadway
