= Rick Aiello =

American actor (1955–2021)

- Born: September 21, 1955
- Died: July 26, 2021 (aged 65); Warwick, New York, U.S.
- Occupations: Film and television actor
- Years active: 1984–2016
- Spouse: Arlene Urichich
- Children: 2
- Father: Danny Aiello
- Relatives: Michael Kay (cousin)
- Family: Danny Aiello III (brother)

Richard Aiello (September 21, 1955 – July 26, 2021) was an American film and television actor. He was known for playing Officer Long in the Spike Lee films Do the Right Thing and Jungle Fever.

== Career ==
Aiello worked as a nightclub bouncer, bartender and club manager, and later pursued his acting career.

Aiello guest-starred in television programs including Diagnosis: Murder, L.A. Law, 21 Jump Street, CSI: Crime Scene Investigation, Early Edition, The Sopranos, Walker, Texas Ranger and 18 Wheels of Justice. He also appeared and co-starred in films such as Spike Lee's Do The Right Thing, Jungle Fever and Clockers as NYCPD patrol officers, One Good Cop as an NYCPD detective, She Hate Me, Twin Peaks: Fire Walk with Me, The Don's Analyst, Me and the Kid, Hollywood Confidential, Sex and the City, A Brooklyn State of Mind, 29th Street and Silent Madness. Aiello also co-starred in the short-lived American crime drama television series Dellaventura, playing Teddy Naples. He retired in 2016, last appearing in the film Nobody's Perfect.

== Personal life ==
Aiello was the son of actor Danny Aiello. Aiello died of pancreatic cancer at St. Anthony Community Hospital (WMCHealth) in Warwick, New York, on July 26, 2021, at the age of 65.

== Filmography ==
=== Film ===
Year	Title	Role	Notes
1984	Silent Madness	Michael	
1984	The Terminator	Bouncer	
1989	Do the Right Thing	Officer Long	
1989	Harlem Nights	Man #1	
1990	Downtown	Mickey Witlin	
1990	The Closer	Billy Grant	
1991	One Good Cop	Knudson	
1991	Switch	Wiseguy at Duke's	
1991	Jungle Fever	Officer Long	
1991	29th Street	Jimmy Vitello	
1992	Twin Peaks: Fire Walk with Me	Cliff Howard	
1993	Me and the Kid	Agent Pasetta	
1994	Minotaur	Mink	
1994	Endangered	Sheriff Shirley	
1995	Clockers	Cop #2	
1998	A Brooklyn State of Mind	Nicky Vetrino	
2000	Other Voices	Mink	
2001	One Eyed King	Terry / Voice over	
2004	She Hate Me	Rocco Bonasera	
2004	Jimmy Whispers Returns to Mulberry Street	Bobby Bars	
2005	Remedy	Tom	
2005	Brooklyn Lobster	Tommy C.	
2007	The Gentleman	Cooper Russo	
2008	Sex and the City	Angry Driver	
2012	Destination Fame	Mr. Perry	
2014	Twin Peaks: The Missing Pieces	Cliff Howard	
2014	Reach Me	Maitre D'	
2016	Nobody's Perfect	Dr. Drummond	

=== Television ===
Year	Title	Role	Notes
1989	Perry Mason: The Case of the Musical Murder	Parker Newton	Television film
1989	The Preppie Murder	Policeman	Television film
1989	21 Jump Street	Lenny	Episode: "Say It Ain't So, Pete"
1990	K-9000	Waiter	Television film
1990	Parker Kane	Bartender	Television film
1990	Knights of the Kitchen Table	Barry	Television film
1991	L.A. Law	Michael Maceina	Episode: "Badfellas"
1992	The Fifth Corner	Ovid Giorgano	Episode: "Home"
1992	Tales from the Crypt	Marty	Episode: "This'll Kill Ya"
1992	Angel Street	Gianni America	Episode: "Death of a Car Salesman"
1993	Renegade	Johnny Bendetti	Episode: "The Rabbit and the Fox"
1994, 1996	Diagnosis: Murder	Eddie Romero / Daniel Strega	2 episodes
1994, 2001	Walker, Texas Ranger	Chachi / Anthony	2 episodes
1995	Marker	Hit man	Episode: "Factor X"
1995	Brothers' Destiny	Yale Preacher	Television film
1995, 1996	Strange Luck	Frankie	2 episodes
1996	NYPD Blue	Joe Carlin	Episode: "A Tushful of Dollars"
1996	High Incident	Al	Episode: "52 Car Pick-Up"
1997	Hollywood Confidential	Joey Di Rosa	Television film
1997	The Don's Analyst	Frankie Leoni	Television film
1997–1998	Dellaventura	Teddy Naples	14 episodes
1998	Clueless	Jason	2 episodes
2000	Early Edition	Knuckles	Episode: "Everybody Goes to Rick's"
2001	18 Wheels of Justice	Eddie 'The Horse' Ferenga	Episode: "Amore... Omerta"
2001	V.I.P.	Dolman	Episode: "Amazon Val"
2002	100 Centre Street	William Monteleone	Episode: "Justice Delayed"
2002	CSI: Crime Scene Investigation	Boxing Referee	Episode: "Fight Night"
2003	Law & Order: Special Victims Unit	Craig Fulton	Episode: "Choice"
2006, 2008	Law & Order: Criminal Intent	Thug Boyfriend / Mac McGregor	2 episodes
2007	The Sopranos	Ray-Ray D'Abaldo	2 episodes
2010	Ugly Betty	Bouncer #1	Episode: "London Calling"
