= 29th Street (film) =

1991 film by George Gallo

- Promotional film poster
- Directed by: George Gallo
- Written by: George Gallo; Frank Pesce; James Franciscus (story)
- Produced by: David Permut
- Starring: Danny Aiello; Anthony LaPaglia; Lainie Kazan
- Cinematography: Steven Fierberg
- Edited by: Kaja Fehr
- Music by: William Olvis
- Production companies: JVC Entertainment Networks; Largo Entertainment; Permut Productions
- Distributed by: 20th Century Fox
- Release date: November 1, 1991
- Running time: 101 minutes
- Country: United States
- Language: English
- Budget: <$10 million
- Box office: $2,120,564

29th Street is a 1991 American comedy-drama film written and directed by George Gallo and starring Danny Aiello, Anthony LaPaglia, and Lainie Kazan. It was adapted from a story by Frank Pesce and James Franciscus (who had both co-starred in the cult thriller Killer Fish).

== Plot ==
In 1976, Frank Pesce Jr. is a lucky man. His father, Frank Sr., is very unlucky. One day, Frank Jr. buys a lottery ticket and finds that he has a good chance of winning. But Frank Sr. has some gambling debts to the mob and they are willing to take Frank Jr.'s ticket. Frank must decide what to do with the ticket.

== Cast ==
- Danny Aiello as Frank Pesce Sr.
- Anthony LaPaglia as Frank Pesce Jr.
- Lainie Kazan as Mrs. Pesce
- Frank Pesce as Vito Pesce
- Robert Forster as Sergeant Tartaglia
- Ron Karabatsos as Philly "The Nap"
- Rick Aiello as Jimmy Vitello
- Vic Manni as Louie Tucci
- Paul Lazar as "Needle Nose" Nipton
- Pete Antico as Tony
- Donna Magnani as Madeline Pesce
- Sal Ruffino as Angelo
- Tony Lip as Nicky "Bad Lungs"

== Reception ==
On Rotten Tomatoes, 29th Street has an approval rating of 75% based on reviews from 12 critics.
