= In Camelot =

- The Sopranos episode
- Episode no.: Season 5 Episode 7
- Directed by: Steve Buscemi
- Written by: Terence Winter
- Cinematography by: Alik Sakharov
- Production code: 506
- Original air date: April 18, 2004
- Running time: 55 minutes

Episode chronology
← Previous "Sentimental Education"	Next → "Marco Polo"
- The Sopranos season 5

"In Camelot" is the 59th episode of the HBO original series The Sopranos and the seventh of the show's fifth season. Written by Terence Winter and directed by Steve Buscemi, it originally aired on April 18, 2004.

== Starring ==
- James Gandolfini as Tony Soprano
- Lorraine Bracco as Dr. Jennifer Melfi
- Edie Falco as Carmela Soprano
- Michael Imperioli as Christopher Moltisanti
- Dominic Chianese as Corrado Soprano, Jr.
- Steven Van Zandt as Silvio Dante
- Tony Sirico as Paulie Gualtieri *
- Robert Iler as Anthony Soprano, Jr.
- Jamie-Lynn Sigler as Meadow Soprano
- Drea de Matteo as Adriana La Cerva *
- Aida Turturro as Janice Soprano Baccalieri
- Steven R. Schirripa as Bobby Baccalieri
- Vincent Curatola as Johnny Sack
- John Ventimiglia as Artie Bucco
- Kathrine Narducci as Charmaine Bucco
- Steve Buscemi as Tony Blundetto

* = credit only

=== Guest starring ===
- Jerry Adler as Hesh Rabkin

==== Also guest starring ====
- Polly Bergen as Fran Felstein
- Tim Daly as J.T. Dolan
- Joseph Siravo as Johnny Boy Soprano
- Laurie Williams as Young Livia Soprano
- Danny Petrillo as Teenage Tony Soprano
- Frank Vincent as Phil Leotardo
- Leslie Bega as Valentina La Paz
- Joseph R. Gannascoli as Vito Spatafore
- Paul Schulze as Father Phil Intintola
- Carl Capotorto as Little Paulie Germani
- Max Casella as Benny Fazio
- Richard Portnow as Harold Melvoin
- Frank Santorelli as Georgie
- Danielle Di Vecchio as Barbara Soprano Giglione
- Arthur Nascarella as Carlo Gervasi
- Angelo Massagli as Bobby Baccalieri III
- Miryam Coppersmith as Sophia Baccalieri
- Artie Pasquale as Burt Gervasi
- Chris Caldovino as Billy Leotardo
- Rae Allen as Quintina Blundetto
- Fred Caiaccia as Uncle Zio
- Allen Enlow as Dr. Harry Winer

== Synopsis ==
Tony's Aunt Concetta dies. After the funeral, at his father's grave, he happens to meet Fran Felstein, his father Johnny Boy's longtime comàre. They continue to meet, and Tony learns more about his father from her. He learns that, pressured by his mother Livia, Johnny Boy took his childhood dog Tippy away; he gave it to Fran, and it became her son's dog. Fran also remembers Junior who, she says, almost used to stalk her; Junior tells Tony he loved her but was not bold enough to tell her. Fran also tells Tony about a one-time fling with President John F. Kennedy.

Tony and Fran tour a midget car racetrack in New Egypt; she has explained that Johnny Boy had promised to leave her a share of the racetrack, but that Phil and Hesh Rabkin cheated her out of it. Tony undertakes to collect the money on her behalf and has a sit-down with Phil and Hesh, mediated by Johnny. While Hesh agrees to pay, Phil objects to paying 25% and delays payment. When Tony spots him in the street, there is a car chase that ends with Phil crashing into a truck. Later, Tony is able to collect $150,000 for Fran.

Junior, with his mental health and memory now improved due to new medication, says he is going stir crazy while still under house arrest. He begins going to every funeral he can, even when he knows the deceased only slightly, just to get out of the house. However, at the funeral of Concetta's husband, who died shortly after his wife, Junior begins crying uncontrollably and has to be helped away by Bobby and Janice. Junior later breaks down in his physician's office when he mentions the lack of purpose in his life.

Christopher begins to spend time with J.T. Dolan, a television screenwriter he met in rehab. The two offer to support one another when they get the urge to use. After he loses a sports bet to J.T., Chris introduces him to the family's high-stakes poker games. J.T. runs up $60,000 in debt and starts missing payments; Chris and Little Paulie go to his apartment and beat him up. J.T. loses some writing jobs, causing him to turn to heroin. Chris then helps direct him back toward rehab.

Tony's friendship with Fran begins to sour as he learns that Johnny Boy was often with her when he was needed, including the night Livia was hospitalized for a miscarriage; on that occasion, Tony had to lie to his mother to protect his father. Furthermore, Fran starts to openly disparage Livia to Tony and, after claiming she was broke, buys expensive clothes with the money he obtained for her. Dr. Melfi suggests he could have more sympathy for Livia, forgive her, and forget. Tony remains unsympathetic, recalling that Livia made his father give Tippy away. As the episode closes, Tony starts regaling his buddies at the Bada Bing with exaggerated accounts of Fran's involvement with JFK.

== First appearances ==
- J.T. Dolan: Christopher's Alcoholics Anonymous friend, who is also a screenwriter.
- Burt Gervasi: Cousin of Carlo Gervasi, and associate in the Soprano Family.

== Deceased ==
This episode had five deaths, the most in the series, although they all happened offscreen and none of them were murders.

- Aunt Concetta: died of a heart attack
- Vincent Patronella: claimed by Junior to be a distant relation
- Mrs. Crilli: sister of Uncle Junior's cousin by marriage
- Unnamed Boy: 7 years old, died in a jacuzzi; "son of Sal from the dry-cleaners"
- Uncle Nicolo "Zio": husband of Concetta

== Production ==
- Although the seventh episode of the season, it was produced sixth, due to scheduling availability of previous episode director Peter Bogdanovich, as episode director Steve Buscemi wanted to direct an episode in which his character was minimally featured.
- The racetrack that Tony and Fran visit is referred to in the episode as "Chikamauga Raceway in New Egypt." While scenes at the track were filmed at Riverhead Raceway in Riverhead, New York, New Egypt is home to the New Egypt Speedway.

== Music ==
- Kylie Minogue's "Can't Get You Out of My Head" is playing when Chris and J.T. are in the gym.
- The song playing when Chris and J.T. talk at the Bada Bing is "Tongue" by Johnny Heartsman.
- The song blaring from Tony's stereo as he pursues Phil Leotardo is "Rock the Casbah" by The Clash. The song is about censorship of Western music in Islamic countries, like Iran after the Iranian revolution, which began with the fall of The Shah of Iran. Tony refers to Phil like that in future episodes, due to the semblance between Phil and The Shah.
- When Tony takes Fran Felstein to dinner, the title track from John Coltrane's album My Favorite Things is playing.
- The song played at the Bada Bing at the end of the episode, when Tony is exaggerating Fran's exploits with JFK, is "Session" by Linkin Park, from their album Meteora.
- The song played over the end credits is "Melancholy Serenade", the theme from The Jackie Gleason Show, which was composed by Gleason. Fran said that Gleason was present at the March 1961 party at which she met President Kennedy. Other references to Gleason are made throughout the show (e.g., at Tony B's homecoming party at the Bing).
- During a flashback scene of Johnny Soprano, the song "Misty Blue" by Dorothy Moore is playing in the background.

== Reception ==
In the week's Nielsen ratings, "In Camelot" tied with Law & Order: Criminal Intent to lead in the Sunday 9 p.m. timeslot among viewers 18 to 49, with a 4.8 rating and 11 share.

Television Without Pity graded "In Camelot" with an A−, praising the humor in some scenes.

For The Star-Ledger, Alan Sepinwall had a mixed review, questioning the addition of J.T. Dolan as merely a vehicle for Sopranos writers to attack other writers who opposed The Sopranos. Sepinwall found the episode to have "some amazing individual moments" but overall having too much reuse of plot devices or character traits.
