= Henry Yuk =

American actor

Henry Yuk is an American actor known for his roles on numerous television shows. Yuk has also frequently appeared in Broadway plays. The son of immigrants from Guangdong, Yuk was born and raised in Brooklyn. After graduating from Midwood High School, he earned a Bachelor of Arts degree in English and education from Brooklyn College.

== Filmography ==
=== Film ===
| Year | Title | Role | Notes |
|---|---|---|---|
| 1981 | Eyewitness | Vietnamese Man #2 | |
| 1984 | The Pope of Greenwich Village | Assistant Cook | |
| 1984 | C.H.U.D. | Coroner | |
| 1985 | The Last Dragon | Hu Yi | |
| 1987 | Radio Days | Japanese | |
| 1988 | Sticky Fingers | Joey | |
| 1989 | Identity Crisis | White Eye | |
| 1993 | Robot in the Family | Massage Parlor Patron | |
| 1995 | Kiss of Death | Chinese Restaurant Owner | |
| 1997 | Kundun | General Tan | |
| 1998 | A Fish in the Bathtub | Chinese baker | |
| 1998 | Lulu on the Bridge | Chinese Thug | |
| 2002 | Winning Girls Through Psychic Mind Control | Maintenance guy | |
| 2002 | I'm with Lucy | Korean Man | |
| 2005 | Brooklyn Lobster | Bill Lau | |
| 2006 | The Departed | Chinese Government Man | |
| 2007 | Year of the Fish | Mr. Meng | |
| 2009 | The Good Heart | Chin Lee | |
| 2010 | Meet Monica Velour | Amanda's Dad | |
| 2010 | The Sorcerer's Apprentice | Chinese Dragon Carrier | |
| 2015 | Tracers | Chinese Man | |
| 2017 | Where Is Kyra? | Scott | |
| 2018 | Asher | Khan | |

=== Television ===
| Year | Title | Role | Notes |
|---|---|---|---|
| 1985 | Murder: By Reason of Insanity | Dr. Chang | Television film |
| 1989 | Gideon Oliver | Man Toasting Wu | Episode: "Tongs" |
| 1992 | Guiding Light | Nakamura | Episode #1.11482 |
| 1997 | Law & Order | Lao | Episode: "We Like Mike" |
| 1998 | Dellaventura | Henry Chang | Episode: "Made in America" |
| 1998, 2000 | Cosby | Mr. Wong | 2 episodes |
| 2000 | Third Watch | Driver | Episode: "Spring Forward, Fall Back" |
| 2001 | Deadline | Vendor | Episode: "The Old Ball Game" |
| 2004 | Chappelle's Show | Asian Delegation Rep | Episode: "Samuel Jackson Beer & Racial Draft" |
| 2004 | The Sopranos | Sungyon Kim | Episode: "Sentimental Education" |
| 2006 | Law & Order: Criminal Intent | Bradley | Episode: "Watch" |
| 2009 | Une aventure New-Yorkaise | Salesman | Television film |
| 2012 | NYC 22 | Elian | Episode: "Pilot" |
| 2012 | Nurse Jackie | Lok-Kwan | Episode: "Slow Growing Monsters" |
| 2016 | The Tick | Shaman | Episode: "The Tick" |
| 2017–2018 | Iron Fist | Hai-Qing Yang | Recurring role; 6 episodes |
| 2018 | Luke Cage | Hai-Qing Yang | Guest star; 2 episodes |
| 2019 | Warrior | Long Zii | 4 episodes |
| 2019 | Blue Bloods | Mr. Chow | Episode: "Another Look" |
| 2019 | Law & Order: Special Victims Unit | Arthur Chang | Episode: "Counselor, It's Chinatown" |

=== Video games ===
| Year | Title | Role | Notes |
|---|---|---|---|
| 2004 | Grand Theft Auto: San Andreas | Pedestrian | Voice; uncredited |
| 2008 | Grand Theft Auto IV | The Crowd of Liberty City | Voice |
