= Unidentified Black Males =

- The Sopranos episode
- Episode no.: Season 5 Episode 9
- Directed by: Tim Van Patten
- Written by: Matthew Weiner; Terence Winter
- Cinematography by: Phil Abraham
- Production code: 509
- Original air date: May 2, 2004
- Running time: 59 minutes

Episode chronology
← Previous "Marco Polo"	Next → "Cold Cuts"
- The Sopranos season 5

"Unidentified Black Males" is the 61st episode of the HBO original series The Sopranos and the ninth of the show's fifth season. Written by Matthew Weiner and Terence Winter, and directed by Tim Van Patten, it originally aired on May 2, 2004.

== Starring ==
- James Gandolfini as Tony Soprano
- Lorraine Bracco as Dr. Jennifer Melfi
- Edie Falco as Carmela Soprano
- Michael Imperioli as Christopher Moltisanti
- Dominic Chianese as Corrado Soprano, Jr. *
- Steven Van Zandt as Silvio Dante
- Tony Sirico as Paulie Gualtieri
- Robert Iler as Anthony Soprano, Jr.
- Jamie-Lynn DiScala as Meadow Soprano
- Drea de Matteo as Adriana La Cerva
- Aida Turturro as Janice Soprano Baccalieri *
- Vincent Curatola as Johnny Sack
- John Ventimiglia as Artie Bucco
- Steve Buscemi as Tony Blundetto

* = credit only

=== Guest starring ===
- Ray Abruzzo as Little Carmine
- Chris Caldovino as Billy Leotardo
- Carl Capotorto as Little Paulie Germani
- Max Casella as Benny Fazio
- Robert Funaro as Eugene Pontecorvo
- Joseph R. Gannascoli as Vito Spatafore
- Dan Grimaldi as Patsy Parisi
- Will Janowitz as Finn De Trolio
- Arthur Nascarella as Carlo Gervasi
- Joe Santos as Angelo Garepe
- Frankie Valli as Rusty Millio
- Frank Vincent as Phil Leotardo
- Karen Young as Agent Sanseverino
- Maureen Van Zandt as Gabriella Dante
- Paula Garcés as Felicia Galan
- William DeMeo as Jason Molinaro
- Allison Dunbar as Nicole Lupertazzi
- Aleksa Palladino as Alex
- Joel Blum as Golfer
- Andrew Eisenman as Priest
- Tony Siragusa as Frankie Cortese
- Angel Cabon as Louie Ramos
- Sidney Davidoff as Lee Nieman

== Synopsis ==
Tony notices Tony B's foot injury, which he blames on an attempted assault by several black men. The next day, after Johnny informs him that Joey Peeps' killer was limping, Tony nearly passes out from a panic attack. Upon being confronted, Tony B calmly denies his involvement. Tony, aware of his cousin's tough financial situation, decides to put him in control of an illegal casino on Bloomfield Avenue and have him made. Christopher resents this favoritism.

At Joey's funeral, Johnny realizes that Little Carmine engineered the hit as payback for Lorraine's murder. He suspects Tony B's involvement because one of his informants saw him near the scene of the killing. In a confrontation with Johnny, Tony invents an alibi for Tony B which Johnny reluctantly accepts; he threatens consequences if he finds out he's been lied to. In a session with Dr. Melfi, Tony's panic attacks are traced to his recent encounters with Tony B. He admits the truth about what really happened the night Tony B was arrested in 1986: Tony had a panic attack after arguing with his mother Livia and covered it up with a story of being beaten up by black men. Tony realizes that he has been assuaging his own guilt and shame.

A faux pas causes tensions between Tony and Meadow's boyfriend, Finn DeTrolio. After they make amends, Tony gets Finn a job at a mob-run construction site, where several members of his crew have "No-work" jobs. In the unfamiliar situation, Finn is uneasy. Uneasiness turns into fear after he witnesses a violent encounter between Eugene Pontecorvo and Little Paulie over homophobic jibes. Early another morning, as Finn arrives at work, he accidentally catches Vito performing oral sex on a male security guard. Later, Vito tries to coerce Finn into attending a New York Yankees game with him. Fearing for his life, Finn considers leaving New Jersey, prompting a heated argument with Meadow which lasts the night. Sometime after four o'clock, he proposes to her.

Carmela finally decides to divorce Tony and obtain her share of their assets. Tony is furious when she informs him. Looming over her, he says she is "entitled to shit." Carmela becomes encouraged when she learns that a forensic accountant could discover Tony's unreported financial assets. After contacting several lawyers, however, Carmela realizes that Tony has already consulted them all to prevent them from taking her case, and no forensic accountant is willing to assess his finances. She becomes tearful looking out the window at Tony floating in the swimming pool, while Meadow on the phone tells her about her engagement.

== Title reference ==
Numerous misfortunes that members of the crime family have experienced, usually at one another's hands, are falsely blamed on black men. Four are mentioned in this episode: Tony's absence the night Tony B was arrested; the murder of Jackie Aprile, Jr. in "Army of One"; Tony B's foot injury from the previous episode which he still suffers from in this episode; and the injuries Eugene causes to Little Paulie's head in this episode.

== Production ==
- Joseph R. Gannascoli came up with the idea of Vito being a gay mobster after reading about a member of the Gambino crime family who was gay and allowed to live for the sake of being a good earner.

== Music ==
- The song played over the end credits is "If I Were a Carpenter" sung by Bobby Darin. Christopher also sings a ribald adaptation of the same song in the Season 4 episode "No Show".
- The song played during the scene where Meadow and Finn are at the beach party is "Bichu Rap" by Titi Robin. This song is also heard in the earlier Season 5 episode "Two Tonys".
- The song played while Silvio and Paulie are arguing at the Bing is "Choker" by Fireball Ministry.

== Reception ==
Television Without Pity graded "Unidentified Black Males" with an A+, praising the "balance [of] mob stories with the family stories in a way that was sorely lacking last year." Regarding the scene where Finn and Meadow describe their futures, Television Without Pity described Finn as "liberal and patronizing" and "clueless about romance".

The revelation that Vito Spatafore was a closeted gay man has been analyzed by critics. George De Stefano found it to be the "boldest subversion" in The Sopranos regarding gender. Franco Ricci, professor of Italian studies, observed a "bridge between his publicly straight and privately gay natures" that "flaunts mobster proscriptions."
