= Sentimental Education (The Sopranos) =

- The Sopranos episode
- Episode no.: Season 5 Episode 6
- Directed by: Peter Bogdanovich
- Written by: Matthew Weiner
- Cinematography by: Phil Abraham
- Production code: 507
- Original air date: April 11, 2004
- Running time: 55 minutes

Episode chronology
← Previous "Irregular Around the Margins"	Next → "In Camelot"
- The Sopranos season 5

"Sentimental Education" is the 58th episode of the HBO original series The Sopranos and the sixth of the show's fifth season. Written by Matthew Weiner and directed by Peter Bogdanovich, it originally aired on April 11, 2004.

== Starring ==
- James Gandolfini as Tony Soprano
- Lorraine Bracco as Jennifer Melfi *
- Edie Falco as Carmela Soprano
- Michael Imperioli as Christopher Moltisanti
- Dominic Chianese as Corrado Soprano, Jr. *
- Steven Van Zandt as Silvio Dante
- Tony Sirico as Paulie Gualtieri
- Robert Iler as Anthony Soprano, Jr.
- Jamie-Lynn DiScala as Meadow Soprano
- Drea de Matteo as Adriana La Cerva
- Aida Turturro as Janice Soprano Baccalieri
- Steven R. Schirripa as Bobby Baccalieri
- Steve Buscemi as Tony Blundetto

* = credit only

=== Guest starring ===
- Tom Aldredge as Hugh De Angelis
- Sharon Angela as Rosalie Aprile
- Alison Bartlett as Gwen MacIntyre
- Robert Funaro as Eugene Pontecorvo
- Joseph R. Gannascoli as Vito Spatafore
- Dan Grimaldi as Patsy Parisi
- Liza Lapira as Amanda Kim
- Arthur Nascarella as Carlo Gervasi
- Paul Schulze as Father Phil Intintola
- David Strathairn as Robert Wegler
- Ed Vassallo as Tom Giglione
- Danielle Di Vecchio as Barbara Soprano Giglione
- Henry Yuk as Sungyon Kim
- Dennis Aloia as Justin Blundetto
- Kevin Aloia as Jason Blundetto
- Angela Bullock as Clerk
- Karl Bury as Tom Fiske
- Kimberly Guerrero as Dealer

== Synopsis ==
Tony is finding it increasingly difficult living with A.J., culminating in a physical altercation between them. Carmela allows A.J. to move back in on the condition that he improve his grades and behavior. She goes to see Robert Wegler at the school and agrees to have dinner with him the following evening. After dinner, they go to his home and have sex. Carmela meets Father Phil Intintola for lunch and tells him of her new relationship; he reminds her that she made a commitment to her husband before God. However, she continues the affair, even after making formal confession to Father Phil.

During a date with Wegler, Carmela repeatedly keeps harping on about her concerns with A.J.’s academic performance and her troubles with the laws of the Church. While kissing, she wonders aloud whether Wegler could pressure A.J.'s English teacher, Mr. Fiske, to raise his grade, before abruptly walking out on an aroused Wegler. The next day, Wegler pressures Fiske to raise AJ's grade for a poorly written term paper.

After several rounds of sex, with Carmela constantly talking about strategies to elevate A.J.'s academic standing, Wegler concludes that she is just using him to get her son better grades and confronts her, telling her that she uses people. Carmela, deeply hurt, vehemently rejects his assessment. Wegler calmly stands his ground, and Carmela storms out, vaguely threatening him. The next day, when her father suggests that she look for other men, Carmela replies that, as Tony's wife, her motives will always be distrusted.

Tony B tries to adjust to civilian life. His Korean-American employer, who was pressured by Tony into giving Tony B a job, is hostile due to Tony B's mob connections. The employer changes his mind when he realizes how hardworking Tony B is, both on the job and in his efforts to pass the state massage board exam. He offers to partner up with Tony B, offering an empty storefront in West Caldwell. Tony B passes the exam and begins work on the storefront, preparing it for business. However, he comes across a bag containing $12,000, apparently thrown away by fleeing drug dealers, and goes on a self-destructive tear, wasting most of the money on gambling, alcohol, and expensive clothes. Tony B's employer visits the store and encourages him to keep on working; Tony B snaps and beats him up. With Tony at Nuovo Vesuvio, Tony B hints that he screwed up and asks if Tony still needs someone to cover the airbag scheme.

== Title reference ==
- Sentimental Education is a novel by Gustave Flaubert, who also wrote Madame Bovary, which Mr. Wegler recommends to Carmela.

== Production ==
- The episode was directed by Peter Bogdanovich, who also has a recurring guest role as Elliot Kupferberg (Melfi's psychotherapist) on the show, although he does not appear in this episode.
- Although the sixth episode of the season, it was produced seventh, due to the scheduling availability of director Peter Bogdanovich, as the following episode was directed by cast member Steve Buscemi, who wanted to direct an episode in which his character was minimally featured.

== Cultural references ==
- Carmela finds the book The Letters of Abelard and Heloise in Wegler's bathroom and asks him about it. She later tells Father Phil, who erroneously corrects her pronunciation of 'Heloise'.
- During her confession, Carmela tells Father Phil Intintola that her affair makes her feel like "walking around on a cloud" as the character Maria from the West Side Story.
- Tony Blundetto refers to "piping in a little Keith Jarrett" when discussing his plan for a massage studio.
- Tony Blundetto buys his twin sons a pair of Nintendo Game Boy Advance handheld game consoles.
- A.J. tries to write an English school paper on Animal Farm but ends up plagiarizing it. He later tries to write a paper on Lord of the Flies, which he also plagiarizes.
- When Wegler tells A.J.'s English teacher, Mr. Fiske, to raise the grade of his term paper that was "90 percent CliffsNotes," Fiske refers to A.J. as "Fredo Corleone," a character from The Godfather novel and films, alluding to the fact that he is part of a powerful family despite being an unintelligent member.
- After Tony Blundetto tells Paulie and the others at Satriale's Pork Store about his business opportunity with Kim, Paulie comments "Word to the wise, remember Pearl Harbor!", ignorant to the fact that Kim is actually Korean.
- Kim compares Tony B to Henry Ford.

== Music ==
- The song played on Tony B's delivery truck radio when it's stolen is "The Breakup Song (They Don't Write 'Em)" by The Greg Kihn Band.
- The song played when Carmela is deciding what to wear before seeing Robert Wegler is "The Angels Listened In" by The Crests.
- The song played when Carmela and Bob eat at a restaurant is "Mon homme" (lyrics by Maurice Yvain).
- The song played when Carmela is peeling the cucumber is "Over The Mountain" by Johnnie & Joe.
- The song played in Paulie's Cadillac is "Hold Me, Thrill Me, Kiss Me" by Mel Carter.
- The song played over the end credits is "The Blues is my Business" by Etta James.
- Tony Blundetto's ringtone is a monophonic version of "We Are The Champions" by Queen
- The song played in the restaurant at the end is a version of Modern Jazz Quartet's "Django".

== Reception ==
"Sentimental Education" had 9.9 million viewers, for a 5.3 rating and 13 share on its original broadcast on April 11, 2004. The episode also won its timeslot among viewers aged 18 to 49 for all television.

Television Without Pity graded "Sentimental Education" with a B, criticizing the single-line appearance of Meadow as filler and Tony B finding a bag of cash as a poorly written plot device in developing Tony B's return to gang activity.

Franco Ricci, professor of Italian studies at the University of Ottawa, noted the symbolism of Carmela helping A.J. with a homework assignment about Lord of the Flies and Carmela's affair with school counselor Robert Wegler. Observing that the affair is likely transactional in value relating to A.J.'s grades, Ricci explains: "...the Golding story of disaster when individuals cannot govern their own impulses should be compulsory reading for Carmela as she heads down the path of eventual heartache."
