= Harry: A Communication Breakdown =

- Directed by: Jonathan Doscher; Fran Ganguzza
- Narrated by: Danny Aiello
- Release date: 2008
- Country: United States

Harry: A Communication Breakdown is a 2008 documentary film written, produced, and directed by Jon Doscher and Fran Ganguzza, and executive produced by Kevin Leckner of Starline Films, modeled after Roberta Roesch's novel Anyone's Son. The film is narrated by Danny Aiello.

== Incident ==
On November 28, 1976, Harry De La Roche, Jr., an 18-year-old cadet at The Citadel in Charleston, South Carolina, on furlough after his first three months at the citadel, fatally shot his parents and younger brothers with a .22 caliber pistol as they slept in their home in Montvale, New Jersey.

On January 26, 1978, De La Roche was found guilty of first degree murder for fatally shooting his parents and two younger brothers. Judge James F. Madden of Superior Court imposed concurrent life terms for each of the four counts of murder, the mandatory sentence for first‐degree murder convictions in New Jersey. De La Roche was denied parole for the 6th time in 2019.

== Plot ==
Harry: A Communication Breakdown follows the story of the 1976 De La Roche family murders and the testimony of people involved in the case, including Harry De La Roche.

Doscher interviews Harry, who gives his explanation of what happened in his first interview after serving almost 30 years of his sentence for the murders.
