= Frank Pesce =

American actor (1946–2022)

- Born: December 8, 1946; New York City, U.S.
- Died: February 6, 2022 (aged 75); Burbank, California, U.S.
- Occupation: Actor
- Years active: 1974–2022

Frank Pesce (December 8, 1946 – February 6, 2022) was an American film and television actor.

== Early life ==
Born in New York City, Pesce was the son of two working-class Italian parents.

== Career ==
Pesce started his film career as an extra in The Godfather Part II, and got his first credited role in 1976, in an episode of the television series Police Story. He guest-starred a large number of well-known TV-series, including Knight Rider, Kojak and Matlock, and was a busy character actor in films, notably appearing in Rocky, Top Gun, Beverly Hills Cop and Flashdance. He wrote the script of the film 29th Street, based on his own autobiographical experiences. He made his last appearance in 2015, in Creed.

== Personal life ==
A cancer survivor, Pesce died of dementia complications on February 6, 2022, at the age of 75.

== Filmography ==
=== Film ===
Year	Title	Role	Notes
1976	Rocky	Spectator	Uncredited
1977	Sorcerer	Married Man	Uncredited
1978	Fingers	Carmine	
1978	Paradise Alley	Skinny the Hand	
1978	The One Man Jury	Freddie	
1979	Tilt	Rock Manager (Carrots)	
1979	Killer Fish	Warren	
1980	American Gigolo	Suspect #4	
1980	Defiance	Herbie	
1980	Maniac	T.V. Reporter	
1982	Young Doctors in Love	Rocco	
1982	Vigilante	Blueboy	
1983	Flashdance	Mawby's Regular	
1983	Eureka	Stefano	
1983	The Big Score	J.C.	
1984	Beverly Hills Cop	Cigarette Buyer	
1986	Top Gun	Bartender	
1986	Hollywood Harry	Peter the Producer	
1986	The Messengers	Man 1	
1987	Beverly Hills Cop II	Carlotta	
1988	Maniac Cop	Watchman	
1988	Cameron's Closet	Ed Wallace	
1988	Midnight Run	Carmine	
1989	Hit List	Quigley	
1989	Lock Up	Johnson	
1989	Relentless	Marra	
1989	The Kill Reflex	Pond	
1990	Maniac Cop 2	Strip Club M.C.	
1991	Steel and Lace	Patroni	
1991	29th Street	Vito Pesce	
1992	The Pamela Principle	Eddie Breeding	
1992	Maniac Cop III: Badge of Silence	Tribble	
1993	South Beach	Jimmy	
1993	Mirror Images II	Clerk	
1994	Ice	Mobster	
1994	The Pamela Principle 2	Ralph	
1994	Trapped in Paradise	Caesar Spinoza	
1996	Original Gangstas	Detective Waits	
1996	Uncle Sam	Barker	
1997	Donnie Brasco	Wiseguy	
1997	Night Vision	Mike Mahoney	
1999	Black and White	Joey	
2000	Down 'n Dirty	Kingpin	
2001	Double Take	Vito	
2002	On the Edge	Bo	
2004	The Whole Ten Yards	Policeman #1	
2009	Middle Men	Bar Patron	
2011	Tower Heist	Riker's Prison Guard	
2013	Grudge Match	Journalist #4	
2014	The Expendables 3	Fight Watcher	
2014	Reach Me	Frank's Henchman	
2015	Creed	Mickey's Gym Doorman	
2022	Beyond the Neon	Strip Club Owner	

=== Television ===
Year	Title	Role	Notes
1976	Police Story	Frank	Episode: "Eamon Kinsella Royce"
1977	The Godfather Saga	Extra	Miniseries
1977, 1978	Kojak	Jerry Gerson / Spencer	2 episodes
1983	Knight Rider	Director	Episode: "Give Me Liberty... or Give Me Death"
1983	The Greatest American Hero	Bartender	Episode: "Vanity, Says the Preacher"
1983	Emergency Room	Dusted Man	Television film
1984	Blue Thunder	Guard / Gunner	Episode: "Payload"
1984	The Master	Officer Thomas	Episode: "Rogues"
1984	Hardcastle and McCormick	Valet	Episode: "Ties My Father Sold Me"
1985	Miami Vice	Benny	Episode: "The Home Invaders"
1985	Airwolf	Ray	Episode: "The Deadly Circle"
1985–1992	Who's the Boss?	Various roles	4 episodes
1986	Doing Life	Red Hot	Television film
1986	Cagney & Lacey	Perp	Episode: "Roll Call"
1988	Matlock	Bailiff	2 episodes
1989	The Cover Girl and the Cop	Assistant Director	Television film
1990	Bar Girls	Joe	Unsold pilot
1991, 1992	Jake and the Fatman	Barkeep / Jerry	2 episodes
1992	Reasonable Doubts	Taliaferro	2 episodes
1992	In the Shadow of a Killer	Torelli	Television film
1992	Ring of the Musketeers	Joey Gardner	Television film
1993	Casualties of Love: The "Long Island Lolita" Story	Rehab Patient	Television film
1993	Blindsided	Detective	Television film
1994	Another Midnight Run	Vito	Television film
1993	North & South: Book 3, Heaven & Hell	Luis	Episode: "Summer 1865 - Autumn 1865"
1997	The Single Guy	Cabbie	Episode: "Starting Over"
1997	The Tony Danza Show	Guy	Episode: "Pilot"
2000	Falcone	Bodyguard #1	Episode: "Pilot"
2003–2004	Karen Sisco	Sonny	5 episodes
2005	Jane Doe: Til Death Do Us Part	Rocco Galletta	Television film
2007	Final Approach	FAA Official Russo	Television film
2009	Citizen Jane	Virgil Jackman	Television film
2013	Man Life Crisis	Frank	5 episodes
