= Remedy (film) =

- Directed by: Christian Maelen
- Written by: Charlotte Wise; Sandy Eiges; Nicholas Reiner
- Produced by: Jon Doscher; Christian Maelen
- Starring: Frank Vincent; Vincent Pastore; Arthur J. Nascarella; Chuck Zito; Christian Maelen
- Cinematography: Brendan Flynt
- Edited by: Jack Haigis
- Music by: Jonathan Hanser
- Production companies: Starline Films; Lucy's Bone Productions
- Distributed by: American World Pictures; MTI Home Video
- Release date: March 29, 2005
- Running time: 83 minutes
- Country: United States
- Language: English
- Budget: $500,000

Remedy is a 2005 American crime drama directed by Christian Maelen and written by Sandy Eiges, Nicholas Reiner, and Charlotte Wise. The film stars Maelen, Arthur Nascarella, Jon Doscher, Frank Vincent, Vincent Pastore, and Chuck Zito.

== Production ==
Filming took place during April and May 2003, in New Jersey and New York City. The film was produced by Starline Films. Producer Jon Doscher, a native of Woodcliff Lake, New Jersey, chose to feature several Woodcliff Lake natives in the film, including former Woodcliff Lake Mayor Josephine Higgins, who played the part of an ambulance driver.

The film features the debut acting performance of Ace Frehley in a non-Kiss related appearance. He also contributes to the soundtrack.

== Synopsis ==
The film is about a New York City-based artist who claims to have witnessed his best friend's murder. Due to a drug problem, he cannot recall what happened, and is the prime suspect. He desperately tries to remember before it is too late.

== Partial cast ==
- Arthur J. Nascarella as Detective Lynch
- Christian Maelen as Will Bentley
- Jon Doscher as Dr. Evan Quinn
- Frank Vincent as Uncle Charles
- Vincent Pastore as Casper Black
- Chuck Zito as Captain Sallie
- Ace Frehley as Johnny
- Maureen Van Zandt as Wanda
- Cane as Mick
- Rick Aiello as Tom
- Kelly Michaels as Detective Sloane
- Nicholas Reiner as Josh
- Candice Coke as Michelle
- Ina Rosenthal as Mrs. Waxman
- Krie Alden as Mindy
- Susan Mitchell as Mona
- Holly Perkins as Ariel
- Sarah Ford Smith as Kate
- Kathryn Comperatore as Kathy
- Adonis Kapsalis as Art Dealer

== Reception ==
During May 2005, Howard Stern discussed the premiere of Remedy on The Howard Stern Show, at which he spoke to Steven Van Zandt (whose wife Maureen appears in the film) and Danny Aiello about Howard's recent conflicts with the Federal Communications Commission.
