= Michael Kay (sports broadcaster) =

American sportscaster (born 1961)

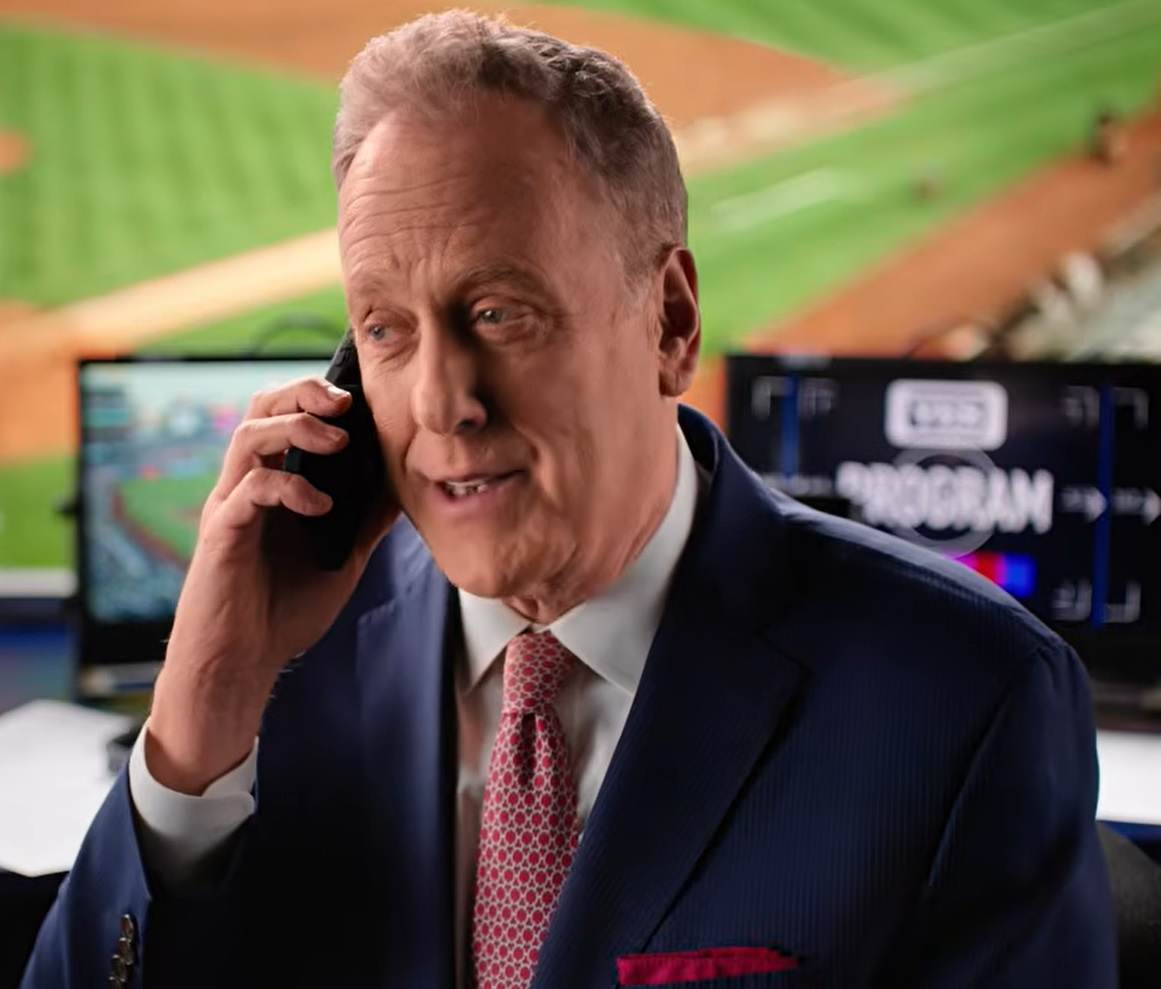
- Kay in a 2026 commercial
- Born: February 2, 1961 (age 65); New York City, U.S.
- Education: Fordham University (B.A.)
- Occupation: Broadcaster
- Years active: 1982–present
- Known for: Broadcaster for the New York Yankees
- Spouse: Jodi Applegate (m. 2011)
- Children: 2
- Relatives: Danny Aiello (uncle); Danny Aiello III (cousin); Rick Aiello (cousin)

Michael Kay (born February 2, 1961) is an American sports broadcaster who is the television play-by-play broadcaster of the New York Yankees and host of CenterStage on the YES Network, and the host of The Michael Kay Show heard on "ESPN New York 880" WHSQ in New York City and simulcast on ESPN Xtra on XM Satellite Radio.

== Early life and education ==
Kay was born and raised in the New York City borough of the Bronx. His father was Jewish and his mother was of Italian descent. Always a Yankee fan, Kay wore number 1 in Little League for his favorite player, Bobby Murcer. Wanting to be the Yankees announcer when he grew up, he wrote as many of his school assignments as he could about the Yankees, so he could learn all about them. Kay began his reporting career at the Bronx High School of Science and continued reporting at Fordham University for their radio station WFUV. He earned a Bachelor of Arts in communications from Fordham.

== Early career ==
Kay started his professional career with the New York Post in 1982 as a general assignment writer, with sports-specific assignments to college basketball, the National Basketball Association and the New Jersey Nets happening over time. He received the writing assignment covering the Yankees in 1987.

In 1989, Kay left the Post for the Daily News, still primarily covering the Yankees. Kay also served as the Madison Square Garden Network Yankee reporter starting in 1989.

In 1992–99, he was MSG's locker room reporter for the New York Knicks. He had previously worked for the network as a contributor on the news-format sports show MSG SportsDesk. Kay left the Daily News to host a sports talk show on WABC in 1992, briefly returning to write "Kay's Korner" for the Daily News in 1993, before taking a job doing radio broadcasts of New York Yankees games with John Sterling. Kay also worked as a reporter for Fox Sports Net in the late 1990s.

== Announcer for the New York Yankees (1992–present) ==
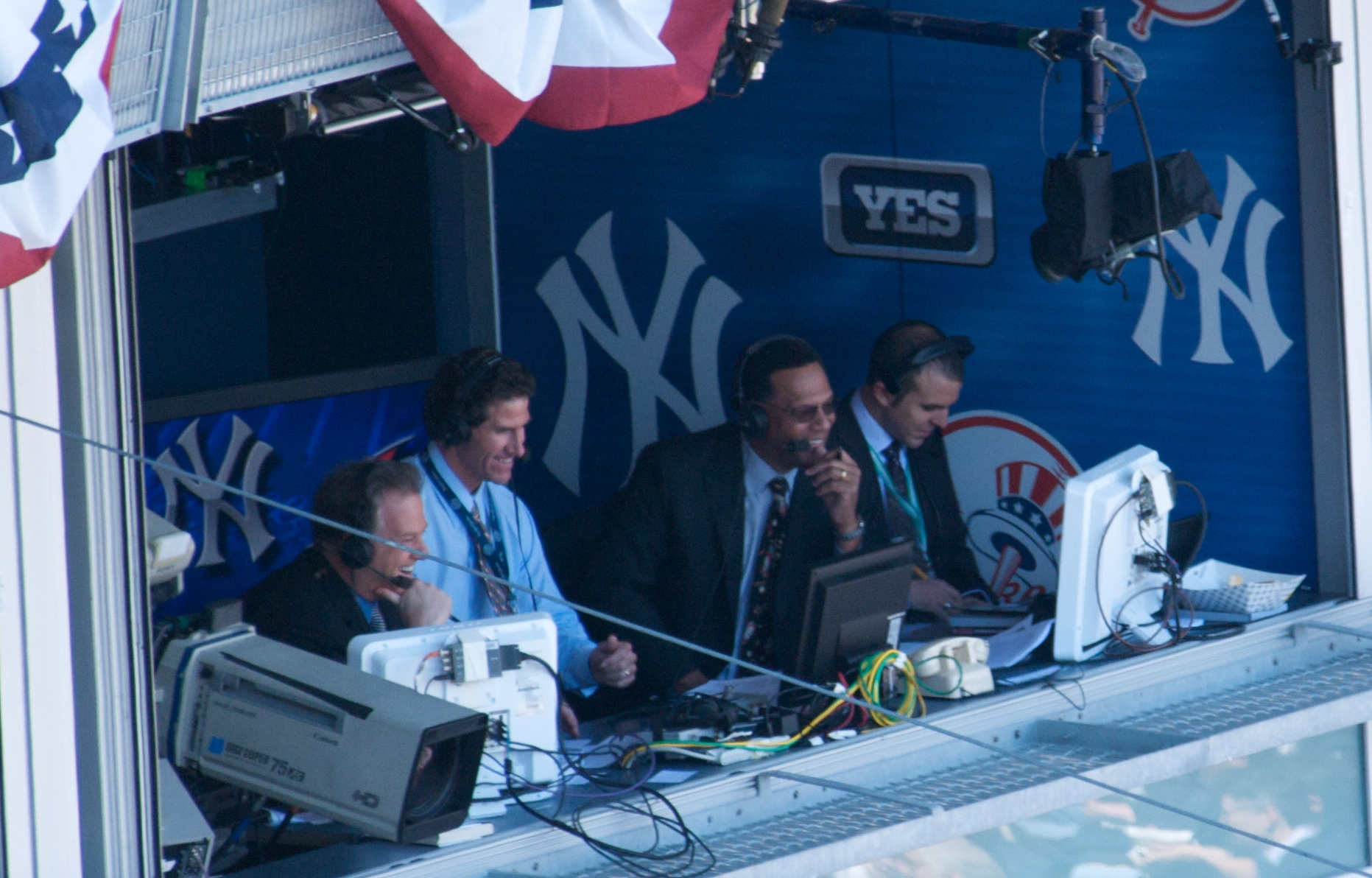
Kay (far left) with Paul O'Neill, Ken Singleton, and Ryan Ruocco providing play-by-play commentary for the Yankees on YES

Kay spent a decade partnered with Sterling as the radio announcers of the team on WABC from 1992 to 2001. Kay and Sterling also paired together in 1998 for Sports Talk with John Sterling and Michael Kay, a nightly radio show which aired on WABC.

During the baseball season, the duo hosted Yankee Talk, a weekend pre-game radio show. From 1992 to 1993 Kay hosted his own show on WABC. Kay continued during that time as a spot reporter on ABC Radio, doing off-season shows with Sterling and as a fill-in sports reporter on WABC-TV. When ESPN Radio began leasing (and later purchasing) WEVD radio in 2001, Kay was chosen to host a daily radio show on the newly rechristened "1050 ESPN Radio".

When WCBS acquired the radio rights to the Yankees broadcasts in 2002, Kay moved to the debuting YES Network on television and Sterling remained on the radio. Kay has been the Yankees' lead television play-by-play announcer ever since.

Kay has worked with a series of partners on YES, often with three or four different partners in the same season. Most have been former professional players, including Ken Singleton, David Cone, Al Leiter, Paul O'Neill, Jim Kaat, John Flaherty, Joe Girardi, Lou Piniella, and Bobby Murcer. Kay calls about 125 games a year for the YES Network and Prime Video (the Prime games were formerly broadcast in the Yankees' territory by a network led by WPIX-TV).

In 2008, Major League Baseball invited Kay to call the Home Run Derby at Yankee Stadium during that year's All Star festivities. On September 21, 2008, he joined Jon Miller and Joe Morgan to call the seventh inning of ESPN's broadcast of the final home game at Yankee Stadium against the Baltimore Orioles. According to Miller, Kay was brought in because ESPN felt that they should include the local aspects of broadcasting for the Yankees for this special game, as the YES Network was not allowed to cover the game.

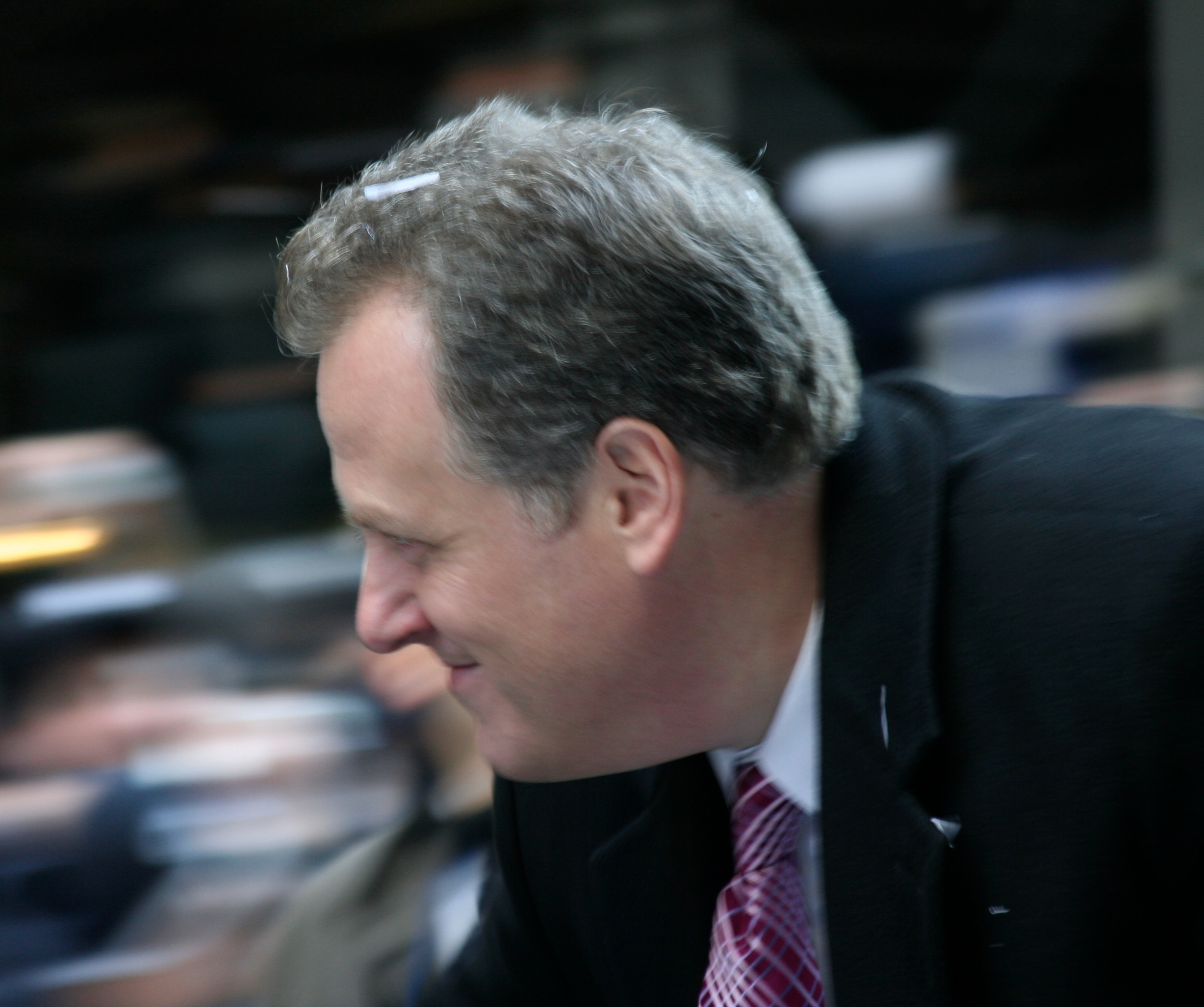
Kay at the 2009 Yankees World Series parade

Since the late 1990s, Kay and Sterling have co-emceed such events as the Yankees' annual Old-Timers' Day ceremony as well as players' number retirements, anniversary celebrations for the team's World Series victories, and the City Hall celebrations after Yankees' World Series victories. Following Sterling's retirement, Kay handled 2024 duties solo.

== Other work ==
Kay and Sterling also provided play-by-play commentary for Nintendo 64's All-Star Baseball video games from 1999 to 2001. In addition to his Yankees work, Kay has called play-by-play of several postseason games on ESPN Radio, including the 2008 NLDS between the Philadelphia Phillies and Milwaukee Brewers, the 2013 ALDS between the Detroit Tigers and Oakland Athletics, and Game 3 of the 2016 ALDS between the Texas Rangers and Toronto Blue Jays.

In January 2022, ESPN hired Kay and Alex Rodriguez to broadcast an alternate Sunday Night Baseball broadcast on ESPN2, similar to the critically acclaimed "Manningcast" for Monday Night Football. These broadcasts ran through 2023.

That same year, Kay also called the 2022 National League Wild Card Series on ESPN alongside Rodriguez. Doing the St. Louis Cardinals-Philadelphia Phillies series, these games were noted for being the final games in the careers of Albert Pujols and Yadier Molina. The duo both went out with singles and getting standing ovations from the crowd as they exited for pinch runners. The Phillies swept the Cardinals in two games in the best of three.

In 2025, Kay began posting “chicken tender reviews” on an Instagram page, following in the example of Dave Portnoy’s pizza reviews. He aims to sample chicken tenders at every ballpark the Yankees visit.

In April 2026, Kay appeared with Larry David in a commercial for YES Network.

=== The Michael Kay Show (2002-present) ===
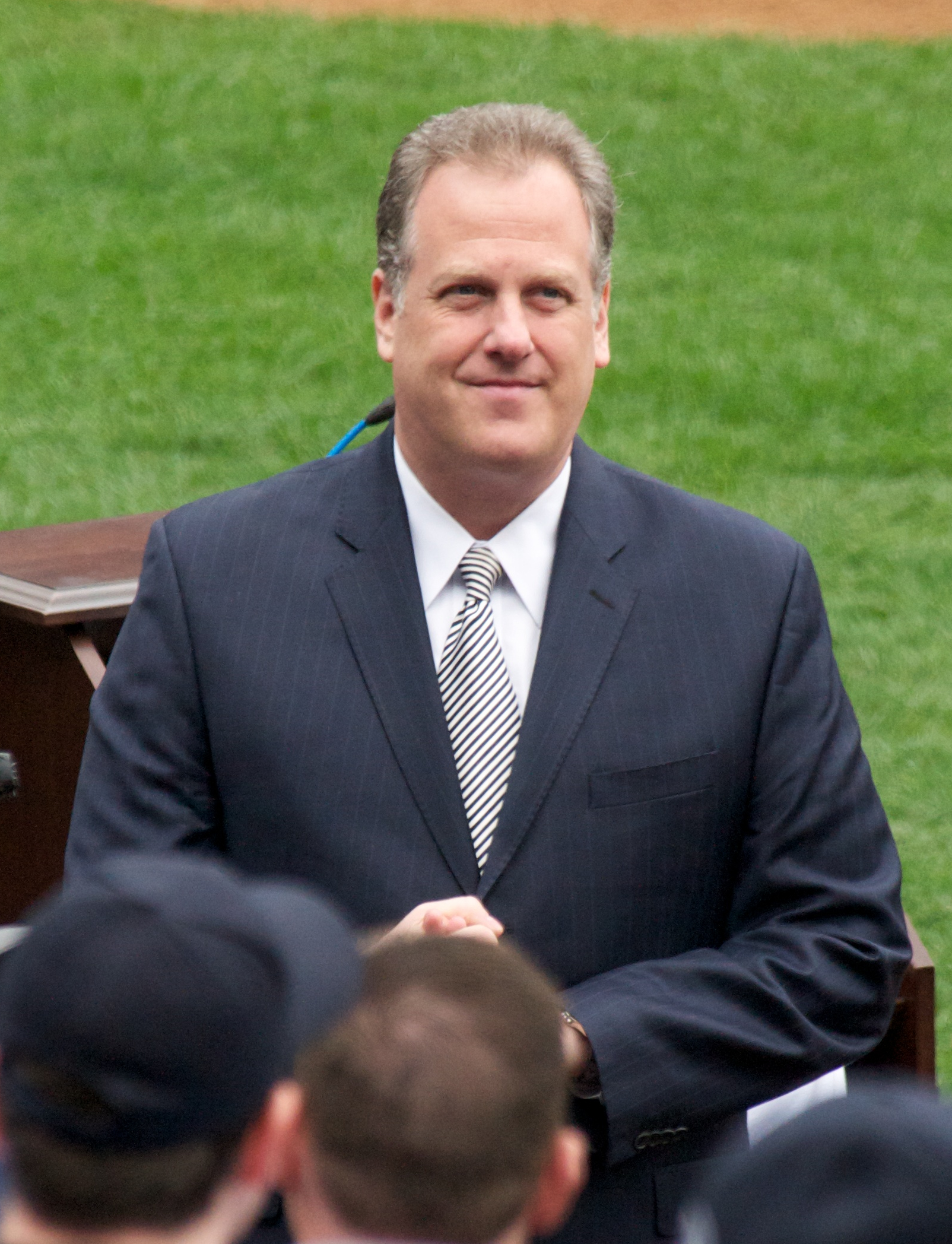
Kay in 2010

In 2002, Kay began hosting a drive-time talk show on WEPN (the former WEVD). That same year he began hosting the YES Network's CenterStage, a sports and entertainment interview-format show.

Kay frequently broadcast live from the vicinity of the stadium that the Yankees were playing in that evening (his contractual exclusivity prohibited him from hosting the show from inside Yankee Stadium). This is no longer the case.

From 2009 until 2011, the 6:00 hour had been co-titled New York Baseball Tonight throughout the baseball season. Kay did not usually appear during that hour if he was broadcasting a Yankee game that evening. Don La Greca often hosted this segment and appeared with Kay on the rest of The Michael Kay Show.

When Kay is on the air for the end of his program, he usually signs off with the following: "In the words of Billy Joel, life is a series of hellos and goodbyes, and I'm afraid it's time for goodbye again," before promoting the next program. Kay opened his first-ever simulcast on the YES Network on February 3, 2014, by dumping a bottle of Diet Coke into the garbage, a move meant to poke fun of the channel's former occupant Mike Francesa. The canned action was widely criticized.

The final broadcast of The Michael Kay Show in its original format was on December 13, 2024. On January 6, 2025, Kay launched a new version of the show with him hosting solo. The show is also available as a podcast.

== Awards ==
In 2003, Kay was added to the Bronx Walk of Fame. In 2007, Kay was nominated for a number of New York Emmy Awards for his work with the YES Network, both for Yankees broadcasts and for his highly rated interview program Centerstage. He won one New York Emmy for his work on the YES Network as part of the team of the NYY broadcast: New York Yankees Baseball "Manny vs. NY – Yankees/Red Sox- 5/24/06." (YES Network).

In 1998, Kay was on the MSG team that won an Emmy for Outstanding Live Sports Coverage—Series. In 1996 and 1997 he was a member of the MSG team that won Emmys for Outstanding Live Sports Coverage—Single Program for Dwight Gooden's no-hitter and The Battle for New York: Yankees vs. Mets, and he was awarded the Dick Young Award for Excellence in Sports Media by the New York Pro Baseball Scouts in 1995, and the award for Best Sports Reporter at the 2000 New York Metro Achievement in Radio Awards.

== Personal life ==
Kay married television journalist Jodi Applegate on February 12, 2011, with former New York mayor Rudy Giuliani officiating. Guests included former Yankees such as Al Leiter, Tino Martinez, and Paul O'Neill, actors Robert De Niro, Bobby Cannavale, and Billy Crystal, and actor/uncle Danny Aiello. The couple have two children: a daughter, Caledonia, born in 2013 and a son, Charles, born in 2014. He resides in Greenwich, Connecticut.

On July 3, 2019, Kay announced that he would undergo vocal cord surgery, keeping him out of the broadcasting booth from early July until late August. He returned to the booth on August 17, and returned to his radio show on August 26.

Kay is an infamously picky eater. He has never eaten fish or seafood of any kind, avoids soup entirely because of the slurping sounds and fear of germ contamination on spoons, and does not eat bananas, coffee, veal and cheese unless it is melted or on pizza. In December 2023 at age 62, Kay ate an egg for the first time, in an omelet form.

== See also ==
- New Yorkers in journalism
