= Brooklyn Lobster =

- Poster
- Directed by: Kevin Jordan
- Written by: Kevin Jordan
- Produced by: Darren Jordan; Kevin Jordan; Chris Valentino
- Starring: Danny Aiello; Jane Curtin
- Cinematography: David Tumblety
- Edited by: Mako Kamitsuna
- Music by: Craig Maher
- Distributed by: Meadowbrook Pictures
- Release date: November 4, 2005
- Running time: 93 minutes
- Country: United States
- Language: English
- Box office: $138,267

Brooklyn Lobster is a 2005 American drama film presented by Martin Scorsese and written, produced, and directed by Kevin Jordan. The screenplay is based on Jordan's family's efforts to salvage their Brooklyn-based wholesale and retail seafood operation when the bank defaulted on a loan they had secured to finance a restaurant extension to the business.

== Plot ==
Frank Giorgio's life is thrown into chaos when the bank that loaned him money for a restaurant addition to his seafood business folds and the FDIC demands he repay the loan in full immediately. With the threat of a public auction looming, the very proud and stubborn Frank, his family, and eccentric crew rally to save the business.

Frank's son Michael, who works in the tech world of Seattle, and his girlfriend Kerry return home for Christmas and are dragged into the family drama. Michael's childhood home has been sold, and his mother Maureen, who has separated from Frank and is hoping to establish her own identity apart from the business that has consumed her life, is scheduled to move into a rental house after the holidays. Over the course of two weeks, Michael finds himself sleeping on a pull-out couch with his father in Frank's office, catching wandering lobster crates in the bay, and trying to mend his relationship with Kerry after his father assaults her uncle. Meanwhile, his sister Lauren, who has worked with her father since graduating from college, is striving to keep the lines of communication open among all the family members.

In the end, Frank's longtime customer and friend Bill Lau offers the highest bid on the property, with the idea he and Frank will complete construction of the restaurant and operate it as partners.

== Cast ==
- Danny Aiello as Frank Giorgio
- Jane Curtin as Maureen Giorgio
- Daniel Sauli as Michael Giorgio
- Heather Burns as Kerry Miller
- Marisa Ryan as Lauren Georgio Wallace
- Ian Kahn as Justin Wallace
- Rick Aiello as Tommy
- Sam Freed as James Miller
- Barbara Garrick as Lynn Miller
- Henry Yuk as Bill Lau
- Tom Mason as Chuck Miller
- Stephen Schnetzer as Mr. Hammon
- John Rothman as Sal Guardino

== Production ==
In a bonus feature on the DVD release of the film, Kevin and Darren Jordan discuss family events that inspired them to develop the film. In 1938, their grandfather established a seafood business on Bleecker Street in Manhattan, and later moved it to a waterfront location in the Sheepshead Bay section of Brooklyn where, under the name Jordan's Lobster Dock, it became a popular local landmark. Their father Bill decided to expand the operation by adding a restaurant, but midway through construction the bank that loaned him money to finance the project failed, and the FDIC demanded full repayment of the loan, placing the family in a financial bind.

The film was shot in less than five weeks on the actual site of the Jordan business, as well as in Chinatown and Rockville Centre. All members of Jordan's immediate family had cameo roles.

== Release ==
The film premiered at the Toronto International Film Festival and was shown at the Hamptons International Film Festival, the Avignon Film Festival, and the Bahamas International Film Festival. It went into theatrical release in the US on November 4, 2005, and earned $11,729 in two theaters on its opening weekend. It eventually grossed a total of $138,267.

== Critical reception ==
On Rotten Tomatoes, Brooklyn Lobster has a 47% approval rating, based on 15 reviews, with an average rating of 5.9/10. On Metacritic, the film has a score of 55 out of 100, based on 11 critics, indicating "mixed or average" reviews.

Roger Ebert of the Chicago Sun-Times said the film "has a spontaneous, confident realism about it" and added, "Brooklyn Lobster is a sweet and touching film, worth a visit."

Michael Wilmington of the Chicago Tribune awarded the film three out of four stars, calling it "the kind of smart, realistic indie family drama the movies should give us more often, just as they should more often offer performances as full-blooded and rich as Aiello's and Curtin's here."

Joe Leydon of Variety said, "Despite worthy contributions on both sides of the camera, Brooklyn Lobster comes across primarily as a showcase for Danny Aiello in a powerhouse performance . . . Character's multiple mid-life crises could make this genuinely engaging drama especially appealing to older viewers".
