= Danny Aiello =

American actor (1933–2019)

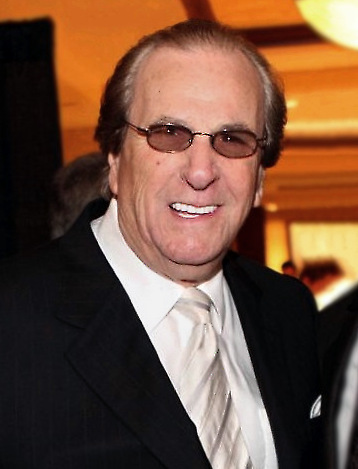
- Aiello in 2011
- Born: Daniel Louis Aiello Jr. June 20, 1933; New York City, U.S.
- Died: December 12, 2019 (aged 86); Saddle River, New Jersey, U.S.
- Occupation: Actor
- Years active: 1970–2019
- Spouse: Sandy Cohen (m. 1955)
- Children: 4, including Danny III and Rick
- Relatives: Michael Kay (nephew)
- Website: dannyaiello.com

Daniel Louis Aiello Jr. (/aɪˈɛloʊ/; June 20, 1933 – December 12, 2019) was an American actor. He appeared in numerous motion pictures, including The Godfather Part II (1974), The Front (1976), Once Upon a Time in America (1984), Hide in Plain Sight (1984), The Purple Rose of Cairo (1985), Moonstruck (1987), Harlem Nights (1989), Do the Right Thing (1989), Jacob's Ladder (1990), Hudson Hawk (1991), Ruby (1992), Léon: The Professional (1994), 2 Days in the Valley (1996), Dinner Rush (2000), and Lucky Number Slevin (2006). He played Don Domenico Clericuzio in the miniseries The Last Don (1997).

Aiello was nominated for an Academy Award for Best Supporting Actor for his role as Salvatore "Sal" Frangione in Do the Right Thing.

== Early life ==
Aiello, the fifth of six children, was born on West 68th Street in Lincoln Square, Manhattan, the son of parents Frances Pietrocova, a seamstress from Naples, Italy, and Daniel Louis Aiello, a laborer who deserted the family after his wife lost her eyesight and became legally blind. For many years, Aiello publicly condemned his father, but the two reconciled in 1993, although Aiello harbored a resentment of his father's conduct. He was of Italian descent. He moved to the South Bronx when he was seven, and later attended James Monroe High School.

At the age of 16, Aiello lied about his age to enlist in the United States Army. After serving for three years, he returned to New York City and did various jobs in order to support himself and, later, his family.

In the 1960s, Aiello served as president of New York Local 1202 of the Amalgamated Transit Union, representing Greyhound Bus workers. In 1967, he presided over an unsanctioned wildcat strike when the company changed bus driver schedules. The strike was called without authorization by the parent union and he was suspended for that action. He called off the strike after one day.

He was also a bouncer at the legendary New York City comedy club, The Improv. In the mid-1980s, he was a nightly regular at Café Central, a bistro frequented by celebrities on 79th Street and Amsterdam Avenue, in Manhattan, and at an eatery named Columbus restaurant on 66th Street and Columbus Avenue.

== Career ==
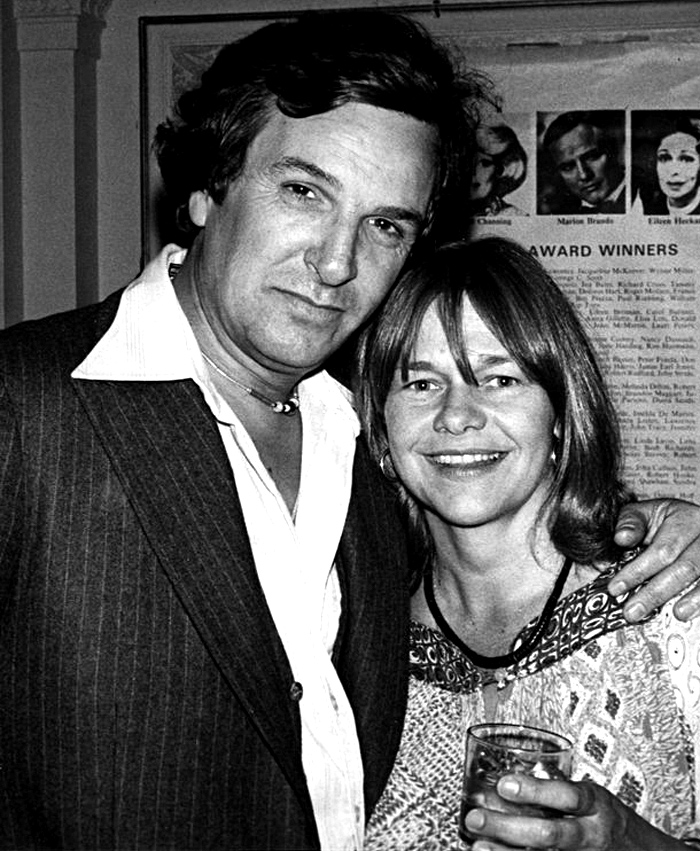
With actress Estelle Parsons in 1977

=== Film and television ===
Aiello broke into films in the early 1970s. One of his earliest roles came as a ballplayer in the baseball drama, Bang the Drum Slowly (1973), with Robert De Niro. Aiello had a walk-on role as small-time hood Tony Rosato in The Godfather Part II (1974), ad-libbing the line "Michael Corleone says hello!" during a hit on rival gangster Frank Pentangeli (Michael V. Gazzo).

Aiello had a co-lead role with Jan-Michael Vincent in Defiance (1980), about some Manhattan residents who fight back against the thugs terrorizing the neighborhood. He received considerable acclaim for playing a racist New York City cop in Fort Apache, The Bronx (1981) with Paul Newman. In 1981, Aiello won a Daytime Emmy Award for Outstanding Performer in Children's Programming for his appearance in an ABC Afterschool Special called A Family of Strangers.

He was paired with De Niro again for the Sergio Leone gangster epic, Once Upon a Time in America (1984), as a police chief whose name was also "Aiello." His many film appearances included two for director Woody Allen, who cast him in The Purple Rose of Cairo (1985), and Radio Days (1987). He played a main role in the 1985-86 television series Lady Blue.

Aiello played Phil Cantone in Harlem Nights (1989) & the pizzeria owner Sal in Spike Lee's Do the Right Thing (1989). At the time of the film's release, in an interview with the Chicago Tribune, he called the role his "first focal part". He further identified the film as a very collaborative effort, during which Lee at one point told him, "Whatever you wanna do, you do." Aiello went on to write a crucial scene he shared with John Turturro ten minutes prior to its production. The role earned him nominations for a Golden Globe Award for Best Supporting Actor – Motion Picture and the Academy Award for Best Supporting Actor, while the film critics' associations of Boston, Chicago, and Los Angeles each named him best supporting actor.

Aiello also portrayed more sympathetic characters. He gained recognition as the befuddled fiancé of Cher opposite her Oscar-winning performance in the romantic comedy Moonstruck (1987), and made a comic appearance in drag for the Robert Altman fashion-industry film Prêt-à-Porter (1994). He also had sympathetic roles in the horror thriller Jacob's Ladder (1990) and the comedy-drama 29th Street (1991).

Aiello played nightclub owner and Lee Harvey Oswald assassin Jack Ruby in the biopic Ruby (1992), the lead role in Paul Mazursky's film business satire The Pickle (1993), the titular character in the Academy Award-winning short film Lieberman in Love (1995), and a political big shot with mob ties in City Hall (1996), starring Al Pacino. He later starred in the independent feature film Dolly Baby (2012), written and directed by Kevin Jordan; Aiello also starred in Jordan's Brooklyn Lobster, which premiered at the Toronto International Film Festival in 2005.

=== Music ===
Aiello's singing was on display in films such as Hudson Hawk (1991), Once Around (1991), and Remedy (2005) that starred his son Ricky Aiello and Jonathan Doscher. He released several albums featuring a big-band including I Just Wanted to Hear The Words (2004), Live from Atlantic City (2008), and My Christmas Song for You (2010). Aiello and EMI songwriter Hasan Johnson released an album of standards fused with rap entitled Bridges in 2011.

He played the father for the video of Madonna's song, "Papa Don't Preach" (1986), and recorded his own answer song, "Papa Wants the Best for You", written by Artie Schroeck.

=== Theater ===
Aiello appeared on the Broadway stage many times throughout the 1970s and 1980s. He appeared in three plays by Louis La Russo II: Lamppost Reunion (his Broadway debut - 1975), Wheelbarrow Closers (1976), and Knockout (1979). In 1977, he originated the role of Fran Geminiani in the long-running play Gemini.

In 1981, Aiello starred in Woody Allen's play The Floating Light Bulb alongside Beatrice Arthur. The play, set in 1945, is a semi-autobiographical tale of a lower middle class family living in Brooklyn, New York City. Frank Rich, critic from The New York Times gave the play a mild review, writing "there are a few laughs, a few well-wrought characters, and, in Act II, a beautifully written scene that leads to a moving final curtain". Rich also compared the play to the work of Tennessee Williams.

In the mid-1980s, Aiello starred in a replacement cast version of Hurlyburly (1984) alongside Christine Baranski, Frank Langella, Ron Silver, and Candice Bergen. He also starred in The House of Blue Leaves (1986) alongside John Mahoney (who earned a Tony Award for his performance), Ben Stiller, Stockard Channing, and Julie Hagerty.

In 2002, Aiello starred in Elaine May's comedic play, Adult Entertainment alongside May's daughter, Jeannie Berlin. The play was directed by Stanley Donen and opened off-broadway at the Variety Arts Theatre. Critic Ben Brantley of The New York Times, described the play as an "often very funny, but overstretched comedy sketch".

In July 2011, Aiello appeared Off-Broadway in the two-act drama The Shoemaker, written by Susan Charlotte and directed by Antony Marsellis. The play is a stage version of his 2006 movie A Broken Sole, which began life in 2001 as a one-act play.

== Personal life ==
Aiello lived in Ramsey, New Jersey, for many years with his wife, Sandy Cohen, whom Aiello married in 1955. He later moved to Saddle River, New Jersey.

In 2014, Aiello published his autobiography, I Only Know Who I Am When I Am Somebody Else: My Life on the Street, on the Stage, and in the Movies via Simon & Schuster. He was the father of stuntman and actor Danny Aiello III, who died in 2010 of pancreatic cancer. Another son Rick, who was also an actor, died in 2021 of the same disease. His surviving children are Jaime, and Stacey Aiello. His nephew is Michael Kay, broadcaster for the New York Yankees.

=== Death ===
Aiello died on December 12, 2019, at age 86, at a hospital in New Jersey, following a brief illness.

Many in the entertainment industry voiced their sadness either on Twitter or released statements, such as his Moonstruck co-star Cher, and Robert De Niro, who starred alongside Aiello in four films: Bang the Drum Slowly (1973), The Godfather Part II (1974), Once Upon a Time in America (1984), and Mistress (1992). De Niro wrote, "I am very saddened to hear of Danny's passing. I have known him for almost 50 years. See you in Heaven, Danny."

== Filmography ==
=== Film ===
Year	Title	Role	Notes
1973	Bang the Drum Slowly	Horse	
1973	The Godmothers		Uncredited
1974	The Godfather Part II	Tony Rosato	
1976	The Front	Danny LaGattuta	
1977	Hooch	Tony	
1978	Fingers	Butch	
1978	Bloodbrothers	Artie Di Falco	
1980	Defiance	Carmine	
1980	Hide in Plain Sight	Sal Carvello	
1981	Fort Apache, The Bronx	Morgan	
1981	Chu Chu and the Philly Flash	Johnson	
1983	Blood Feud	Randy Powers	
1984	Old Enough	Mr. Bruckner	
1984	Once Upon a Time in America	Police Chief Vincent Aiello	
1984	Death Mask	Captain Mike Grasso	
1984	Broadway Danny Rose		Uncredited
1985	The Purple Rose of Cairo	Monk	
1985	The Stuff	Vickers	
1985	The Protector	Danny Garoni	
1985	Key Exchange	Carabello	
1987	Radio Days	Rocco	
1987	Man on Fire	Conti	
1987	The Pick-up Artist	Phil Harper	
1987	Moonstruck	Johnny Cammareri	
1988	The Third Solution	George Sherman	
1988	Shocktroop	John Cunningham	
1989	The January Man	Captain Vincent Alcoa	
1989	White Hot	Charlie Buick	
1989	Do the Right Thing	Salvatore "Sal" Fragione	
1989	Harlem Nights	Phil Cantone	
1990	Jacob's Ladder	Louis	
1990	The Closer	Chester Grant	
1991	Once Around	Joe Bella	
1991	He Ain't Heavy		Short
1991	Hudson Hawk	Tommy "Five-Tone" Messina	
1991	29th Street	Frank Pesce Sr.	
1992	Ruby	Jack Ruby	
1992	Mistress	Carmine Rasso	
1993	The Cemetery Club	Ben Katz	
1993	The Pickle	Harry Stone	
1993	Me and the Kid	Harry	
1994	Léon: The Professional	Tony	
1994	Prêt-à-Porter	Major Hamilton	
1994	Save the Rabbits	Ronnie	Short
1995	Power of Attorney	Joseph Scassi	
1995	Lieberman in Love	Joe Lieberman	Short
1995	Two Much	Gene	
1996	City Hall	Frank Anselmo	
1996	2 Days in the Valley	Dosmo Pizzo	
1996	Mojave Moon	Al	
1997	Bring Me the Head of Mavis Davis	Mr. Rathbone	
1997	A Brooklyn State of Mind	Danny Parente	
1998	Wilbur Falls	Phillip Devereaux	
1999	18 Shades of Dust	Vincent Dianni	
2000	Mambo Café	Joey	
2000	Dinner Rush	Louis Cropa	
2000	Prince of Central Park	Noah Cairn	
2001	Off Key	Fabrizio Bernini	
2003	Mail Order Bride	Tony Santini	
2004	Zeyda and the Hitman	Nathan	
2005	The Fool	Voice of the Dummy	Short
2005	Brooklyn Lobster	Frank Giorgio	
2006	Lucky Number Slevin	Roth	
2006	Last Request	Pop	
2006	A Broken Sole	The Shoemaker	
2010	Stiffs	Frank Tramontana	
2013	Dolly Baby	Tony Lanza	Short
2014	Henry & Me	Dr. Acosta	Voice
2014	Reach Me	Father Paul	
2017	The Neighborhood	Joseph Donatello	
2018	Little Italy	Carlo	
2019	The Last Big Save	Louis Brown	
2019	Making a Deal With The Devil	Mario	
2021	One Moment	Joe McGuinness	Posthumous release; final film role
TBA	Hereafter Musical	Jason	Short

=== Television ===
Year	Title	Role	Notes
1976	Kojak	Mattie	Episode: "Black Thorn"
1977	The Andros Targets	Lt. Phil Lombardi	3 episodes
1978	On Our Own	Skip Mazarelli	2 episodes
1978	The Last Tenant	Carl	TV film
1978	Lovey: A Circle Of Children, Part II	Bernie Serino	TV film
1980	A Family of Strangers	Dominic Ginetti	ABC Afterschool Special
1982	Gemini	Fran	Broadway on Showtime TV film
1982	Nurse	Gene Halley	Episode: "Gene Halley"
1982	The Unforgivable Secret	Frank Caruso	ABC Afterschool Special
1982	A Question of Honor	Martelli	TV film
1983	3-2-1 Contact	Florist	Episode: "Babies: Growth and Development"
1984	Tales from the Darkside	Tommy Vale	Episode: "The Odds"
1985	The Lucie Arnaz Show	Vic Rosetti	Episode: "Good Sports"
1985–1986	Lady Blue	Lt. Terry McNichols	14 episodes
1987	Saturday Night Live	Master of Ceremonies	Episode: "Charlton Heston/Wynton Marsalis"
1987	Daddy	Coach Jacobs	TV film
1987	Night Heat	Frankie D.	Episode: "Comeback"
1988	Alone In The Neon Jungle	Chief	TV film
1989	The Preppie Murder	Det. Mike Sheehan	TV film
1990	Madonna: The Immaculate Collection	Papa	Segment: "Papa Don't Preach"
1992	The Godfather Trilogy: 1901-1980	Tony Rosato	TV reruns
1995	Brothers' Destiny (aka The Road Home)	Duke	TV film
1996	Unforgotten: Twenty-Five Years After Willowbrook	Narrator	Documentary
1996	Saturday Night Live	Himself (host)	Episode: "Danny Aiello/Coolio"
1997	The Last Don	Don Domenico Clericuzio	Miniseries
1997–1998	Dellaventura	Anthony Dellaventura	14 episodes
1998	The Last Don II	Don Domenico Clericuzio	Miniseries
2009	Harry: A Communication Breakdown	Narrator	Documentary
2017	Broken Dreams Blvd	Teddy Berry	TV film
2017	Difficult People	Danny Aiello (voice)	Episode: "Passover Bump"

=== Theatre ===
Year	Title	Role	Venue
1944	Follow the Girls	Dancing Boy	New Century Theatre, Broadway
1975	Lamppost Reunion	Biggie	Little Theatre, Broadway
1976	Wheelbarrow Closers	Chester Grant	Bijou Theatre, Broadway
1977	Gemini	Fran Geminiani	Little Theatre, Broadway
1979	Knockout	Damie Ruffino	Helen Hayes Theatre, Broadway
1981	The Floating Light Bulb	Max Pollack	Vivian Beaumont Theater, Broadway
1985	Hurlyburly	Phil (replacement)	Ethel Barrymore Theatre, Broadway
1986	The House of Blue Leaves	Billy Einhorn	Plymouth Theatre, Broadway
2002	Adult Entertainment	Guy Aikens	Variety Arts Theatre, Off Broadway
2011	The Shoemaker	Performer	Acorn Theatre, Off-Broadway
2017	Home for the Holidays	Performer	August Wilson Theatre, Broadway

== Awards ==
Year	Award	Category	Title	Result	Ref.
1981	Daytime Emmy Award	Performer in a Children's Program	ABC Afterschool Special: A Family of Strangers	Won	
1989	Academy Award	Best Supporting Actor	Do the Right Thing	Nominated	
1989	Golden Globe Award	Best Supporting Actor - Film	Do the Right Thing	Nominated	
1989	Boston Society of Film Critics	Best Supporting Actor	Do the Right Thing	Won	
1989	Los Angeles Film Critics Association	Best Supporting Actor	Do the Right Thing	Won	
1989	Chicago Film Critics Association	Best Supporting Actor	Do the Right Thing	Won	
1991	Chicago Film Critics Association	Best Supporting Actor	Once Around	Nominated	
1994	National Board of Review	Best Ensemble	Prêt-à-Porter	Won	

== Publications ==
- Aiello, Danny (2014). I Only Know Who I Am When I Am Somebody Else: My Life on the Street, On the Stage, and in the Movies. Simon and Schuster. ISBN 9781476751924.

== See also ==
- List of crooners
- Bronx Walk of Fame
