= Me and the Kid =

1993 film by Dan Curtis

- Theatrical release poster
- Directed by: Dan Curtis
- Written by: Richard Tannenbaum
- Based on: Taking Gary Feldman (1970 novel) by Stanley Cohen
- Produced by: Dan Curtis; Lynn Loring
- Starring: Danny Aiello; Joe Pantoliano; Cathy Moriarty; David Dukes; Alex Zuckerman
- Cinematography: Dietrich Lohmann
- Edited by: Bill Blunden
- Music by: Bob Cobert
- Production company: Dan Curtis Productions
- Distributed by: Orion Pictures
- Release date: October 22, 1993
- Running time: 97 minutes
- Country: United States
- Language: English
- Budget: $4 million

Me and the Kid is a 1993 American crime comedy-drama film directed and produced by Dan Curtis. It stars Danny Aiello, Alex Zuckerman, Joe Pantoliano, Cathy Moriarty, and David Dukes. It is based on the 1970 novel Taking Gary Feldman by Stanley Cohen. It was released by Orion Pictures on October 22, 1993, and was Curtis' last theatrical film before his death in 2006.

== Plot ==
A couple of ex-cons, Harry and Roy, break into a home expecting to find $250,000 in a safe, but come away empty-handed. They do, however, take 8-year-old Gary with them, hoping that the boy's father will pay a ransom.

Harry forms a bond with Gary, who has multiple allergies, is home-schooled and has rarely been out in the world. Roy resents the kid-glove treatment of the boy and becomes at odds with his partner over what to do with him. In the end, things between Roy and Harry get violent, but Gary saves Harry's life. While Gary enjoys life with Harry much more than his home life, things get too dangerous and Harry is forced to leave him behind. However, Gary aids Harry in escaping from the authorities. Sometime later, Harry visits Gary at home and the two leave together once more, heading for Mexico to start a new life.

== Cast ==
- Danny Aiello as Harry Banner
- Alex Zuckerman as Gary Feldman
- Joe Pantoliano as Roy Walls
- Cathy Moriarty as Rose Farrell
- David Dukes as Victor Feldman
- Anita Morris as Isobel Feldman
- Rick Aiello as Agent Pasetta
- Demond Wilson as Agent Schamper
- Ben Stein as Fred Herbert
- Robin Thomas as Dr. Berman
- Abe Vigoda as Pawnbroker
- Todd Bryant as J.P.
- Alaina Reed Hall as Sarah

== Production ==
Producer Jack Farren obtained the film rights to Stanley Cohen's novel in 1970, with Curtis attached to direct as his feature film debut. However, financial issues meant the film entered development hell. Curtis' ultimately self-financed the film through his own production company.

The film was shot in New York City and California, in October 1992.

== Reception ==
The film received negative reviews and was a box office bomb. Emanuel Levy of Variety wrote, “Danny Aiello’s considerable talents are wasted…” Kevin Thomas of the Los Angeles Times wrote, “Dan Curtis and writer Richard Tannenbaum fail to establish a satisfying premise.”
