= Wheelbarrow Closers =

- Original language: English
- Written by: Louis La Russo II
- Characters: Millie Grant; John Mogan; Larry Freede; Beatrice Grant; Chet Grant; Chester Grant; Wilfred Dee

Premiere
- Date: 11 October 1976
- Place: Bijou Theatre

Wheelbarrow Closers is a 1976 play written by Louis La Russo II. The show opened at the Bijou Theatre on October 11, 1976 and closed on October 16, 1976 after 8 performances.

== Plot ==
In the present at the Grant household, a tough sales executive comes to grips with the problem of his own retirement.

== Original production ==
The show was directed by Paul Sorvino, scenery Charles Carmello Jr., supervised by Ken Billington, costumes Jan Wallace, supervised Carol Luiken, lighting Leon Di Leone, associate producers Michael Bash, Howard Wesson, and Irving Warhaftig, production stage manager Gary Stein, and press by Max Eisen, Barbara Glenn, Irene Gandy, and Judy Jacksina.

The cast starred Norah Foster (Millie Grant), Ray Serra (John Mogan), Harvey Seigel (Larry Freede), Frances Helm (Beatrice Grant), James Allan Bartz (Chet Grant), Danny Aiello (Chester Grant), and Tom Degidon (Wilfred Dee).

== Adaptations ==
It was adapted into the 1990 film The Closer, starring Danny Aiello, Michael Paré, and Justine Bateman.
