= Defiance (1980 film) =

1980 American film directed by John Flynn

- Film poster
- Directed by: John Flynn
- Screenplay by: Thomas Michael Donnelly
- Story by: Thomas Michael Donnelly; Mark Tulin
- Produced by: Jerry Bruckheimer; William S. Gilmore; Executive producer Robert J. Wunsch
- Starring: Jan-Michael Vincent; Theresa Saldana; Art Carney
- Cinematography: Ric Waite
- Edited by: David Finfer
- Music by: Dominic Frontiere; Gerard McMahon
- Distributed by: American International Pictures
- Release date: March 14, 1980
- Running time: 103 minutes
- Country: United States
- Language: English

Defiance is a 1980 American action neo noir crime film directed by John Flynn and starring Jan-Michael Vincent, Art Carney, and Theresa Saldana. The film was an early Jerry Bruckheimer production.

The film was unsuccessful upon release, both with critics and the public, though it was shown often on cable film channels (such as HBO) in the early 1980s.

== Plot ==
When merchant seaman Tommy Campbell receives a six-month suspension, he is stuck in New York City with nothing to do. He rents a cheap, rundown apartment on the Lower East Side, while harassing a supervisor named Karenski to find him any ship assignment. When Tommy lies that he knows how to speak Spanish, Karenski offers him work on a Panamanian ship. Back at his apartment, Tommy listens to Spanish language records. A kid in a neighboring apartment hears Tommy practicing and imitates him. Marsha Bernstein, another neighbor in the upstairs apartment, sprinkles Tommy when she waters her plants on the fire escape. She visits Tommy's apartment to apologize, chattering about his paintings and his ship photographs, but Tommy becomes bored and disappears into another room.

At the corner grocery store, the owner, Abe, agrees to take Tommy's phone calls until he gets a telephone installed. While they talk, two Souls gang members help themselves to groceries and leave. Although Abe is angry, he does not confront the gang members. As Tommy walks back to his apartment, the Souls gang wonders what he is doing in their neighborhood. One night, Tommy uses the public restroom in the subway. The gang beats him and steals his watercolor paints. At a nightclub, gang leader Angel Cruz gives money to an older Latino named El Bravo, and presents his lady with Tommy's paints. Meanwhile, Marsha finds Tommy collapsed in the apartment lobby and nurses him in her apartment.

The next morning, she warns him not to retaliate and leaves for work. Soon, Tommy takes a walk and talks to his young neighbor and his guardian, Whacko, who are collecting junk by the waterfront. Later, Tommy asks Marsha on a date and they go bowling. Afterward, they walk to the pier and he explains his love of the sea. She tells him she used to share an apartment on the Upper West Side with three other roommates, but now she lives on Barrow Street because she knows the neighborhood and people are friendly. They return home and make love. The next day, Tommy takes a walk with the kid and finds out that he ran away from foster homes and now lives with Whacko. In an alley, they see the Souls taunting Whacko. Tommy starts to fight them, but when a patrol car cruises nearby, the gang disappears. Upon returning to his apartment, Tommy is struck by dead rats that hang by the front door and sees that his walls have been covered in graffiti. He installs stronger door locks and paints over the graffiti. The next day, a neighbor, Carmine DeFranco, invites Tommy out for a drink at the nearby Sportsmen Bar and they become friends. At church bingo, Angel Cruz and his friends rob the players. When Angel tears the front of a woman's dress, Father Rivera warns that Angel will be condemned to eternal hell. As Angel rips the crucifix from the priest's neck, he asks the clergyman what he knows about hell and leaves.

The police arrive to file a report, but the victims are afraid of being further harassed by the gang and refuse to sign a complaint. Finally, Abe has the courage to sign the paperwork. Later, Carmine tries to rally his fellow neighbors to fight Angel and his gang. Tommy does not want to get involved and leaves, but tensions rise when the Souls beat up Abe in his grocery. Later, Marsha's plants die from too little sun so Tommy, the kid, and Whacko build her a new garden on the roof. In a meeting with Karenski, Tommy is told to report to a container ship on Pier 44 called American Trader in one week. Soon, the Souls destroy the roof garden and beat the kid. Angered, Tommy attacks several gang members down by the basketball courts. Using a gang member’s knife found on the pavement, Tommy cuts off the gangster's ponytail. Soon, Angel calls for Tommy’s death, and breaks into Tommy's apartment, threatening him while he is in the shower.

After the Souls leave, Tommy installs bars on his apartment windows, and waits until the last minute to tell Marsha that he is shipping out. She is sad, but she knows she cannot stop him. Carmine visits Tommy and tells him the neighborhood thinks he is a hero because he stood up to the gang, but Tommy knows it is too dangerous to stay. As a taxicab takes Tommy to the ship, he sees the kid running on the street and tells the driver to stop. He follows the kid to an alley, where they see Whacko's dead body. Tommy decides to stick around and destroy Angel's car, while Carmine and his friends join the attack. Afterward, the Souls vandalize Tommy's apartment, then corner Tommy, Carmine, and the others in the alley.

From the fire escapes, neighbors pelt the Souls with garbage. Someone else sets off an explosion and the fighting escalates. When Angel shoots Carmine, Tommy chases the gangster and beats him. The police arrest the Souls and Carmine threatens them with more violence if they come back to the neighborhood. Marsha and the kid prop up a dazed but alive Tommy, who tells officers he wants to sign a complaint. Finally, after the Souls have been defeated, other neighbors agree to sign the police report.

== Cast ==
- Jan-Michael Vincent as Tommy
- Theresa Saldana as Marsha
- Art Carney as Abe
- Danny Aiello as Carmine
- Rudy Ramos as Angel Cruz
- Lee Fraser as Bandana
- Lenny Montana as Whacko
- Joseph Campanella as Karenski
- Tony Sirico (billed as G. Anthony Sirico) as Davey
- Santos Morales as Paolo
- Fernando López as Kid
- Frank Pesce as Herbie
- Ismael "East" Carlo as "El Bravo"

== Production ==
John Flynn later said working with Jan Michael Vincent was difficult:

Jan was a drinker even then. He had Heinekens for breakfast. There was a night scene where we literally had to prop him up. Poor Jan. He latched onto Danny Aiello. Jan loved Danny and tried to give him more of his own lines in the picture. I told Jan he couldn’t mess with the script like that. But Jan was a sweet guy. He never believed that he was an actor, though. He was embarrassed to be an actor. He always thought he was doing an awful job and that people were laughing at him. You had to keep telling him he was wonderful and he would do whatever you wanted him to do. Jan was like a little kid, but he just didn’t believe in himself. Talk about actors’ egos. He was the opposite. This was an actor with a non-ego.
