= Marco Polo (The Sopranos) =

- The Sopranos episode
- Episode no.: Season 5 Episode 8
- Directed by: John Patterson
- Written by: Michael Imperioli
- Cinematography by: Alik Sakharov
- Production code: 508
- Original air date: April 25, 2004
- Running time: 53 minutes

Episode chronology
| ← Previous "In Camelot" | Next → "Unidentified Black Males" |
- The Sopranos season 5

"Marco Polo" is the 60th episode of the HBO original series The Sopranos and the eighth of the show's fifth season. Written by Michael Imperioli and directed by John Patterson, it originally aired on April 25, 2004.

== Starring ==
- James Gandolfini as Tony Soprano
- Lorraine Bracco as Jennifer Melfi *
- Edie Falco as Carmela Soprano
- Michael Imperioli as Christopher Moltisanti
- Dominic Chianese as Corrado Soprano, Jr.
- Steven Van Zandt as Silvio Dante *
- Tony Sirico as Paulie Gualtieri *
- Robert Iler as Anthony Soprano, Jr.
- Jamie-Lynn DiScala as Meadow Soprano
- Drea de Matteo as Adriana La Cerva
- Aida Turturro as Janice Soprano Baccalieri *
- Steven R. Schirripa as Bobby Baccalieri
- Vincent Curatola as Johnny Sack
- John Ventimiglia as Artie Bucco
- Kathrine Narducci as Charmaine Bucco
- Steve Buscemi as Tony Blundetto

* = credit only

=== Guest starring ===
- Ray Abruzzo as Little Carmine
- Tom Aldredge as Hugh De Angelis
- Allison Bartlett as Gwen McIntyre
- Chris Caldovino as Billy Leotardo
- Toni Kalem as Angie Bonpensiero
- Joe Maruzzo as "Joey Peeps"
- Joe Santos as Angelo Garepe
- Paul Schulze as Father Phil Intintola
- Suzanne Shepherd as Mary De Angelis
- Frank Vincent as Phil Leotardo
- Frankie Valli as Rusty Millio
- Sharon Angela as Rosalie Aprile
- Will Janowitz as Finn DeTrolio
- Bruce Kirby as Dr. Russ Fegoli
- Matthew Del Negro as Brian Cammarata
- Marianne Leone as Joanne Moltisanti
- Dennis Aloia as Justin Blundetto
- Kevin Aloia as Jason Blundetto
- Rae Allen as Quintina Blundetto
- Jessica Dunphy as Devin Pillsbury
- Garry Pastore as Jerry Basile
- Barbara Caruso as Lena Fegoli
- Samrat Chakrabarti as Dr. Onkar Singh
- Allison Dunbar as Nicole Lupertazzi
- Louis Mustillo as Sal Vitro
- Tony Siragusa as Frankie Cortese
- Erin Stutland as Heather
- Philip Larocca as Edward "Duke" Bonpensiero
- Sammy Semenza as Carmine III
- Vic Martino as Muzzy Nardo

== Synopsis ==
After the recent car chase, Tony meets with Johnny and agrees to pay for the damage to Phil's car. To control costs, he has the work done in the late Big Pussy Bonpensiero's body shop, now run by his widow Angie. When the work is finished, Phil demands further repairs for non-existent defects.

Tensions continue to rise in New York. Little Carmine's yacht is deliberately sunk. His crew attempt to recruit Tony B through Angelo, his old prison buddy. Angelo and Rusty offer him "a chance to earn": in retaliation for Johnny's hit on Lorraine, "someone has to go". Tony B, knowing that Tony wants to keep the family out of New York hostilities, initially refuses. But he is short of money and an argument with his young sons who envy Tony's standard of living and the privilege AJ enjoys, result in an eventual agreement. His assigned target is Joey Peeps. Tony B finds Joey in his car outside a New York brothel and shoots him along with a prostitute by his side. Tony B's foot is injured when Joey's car rolls over it, and he hobbles back to his own car.

Carmela is planning a surprise party for her father Hugh De Angelis's 75th birthday. Nudged by her mother Mary, she tells Tony that, because of the separation, it would be better if he didn't attend. Tony is taken aback, but consents. Mary does not want him present because she thinks his vulgar behavior will embarrass her in front of an old friend, Russ Fegoli, who will be attending with his wife. Mary has enormous respect for Fegoli, who had a modest career in the Foreign Service. Junior tells Hugh about the party, intentionally ruining the surprise. When Hugh insists that the "man of the house" attend, Carmela reluctantly invites Tony at short notice.

At the party, Mary is duly embarrassed by Tony's behavior. He presents Hugh with a Beretta Giubileo shotgun, but Fegoli observes that the best ones are not exported. At the end of the evening, Tony roughly puts the now-devalued shotgun in the trunk of the car. As the Fegolis are leaving, Mary apologizes to them for Tony's conduct. Carmela is furious at her mother's snobbery, commending Tony for his gift to Hugh and his courtesy to the guests.

As Artie leads the younger guests in a game of Marco Polo, Tony and A.J. grab Carmela and throw her into the pool. Eventually, Tony and Carmela find themselves alone. They kiss in the pool and spend the night together. He leaves in the morning before she wakes.

== Deceased ==
- Joseph "Joey Peeps" Peparelli: shot by Tony Blundetto on Little Carmine's orders
- Heather: prostitute with Joey Peeps; shot by Tony Blundetto

== Title reference ==
- After Hugh's birthday party, a game of Marco Polo breaks out in the Sopranos' pool. The game is named for the Italian explorer Marco Polo; Italian identity and pride plays a role in the episode.

== References to previous episodes ==
- Sal Vitro is seen landscaping at the Sacrimoni residence per the deal that was set up in the episode "Where's Johnny?"
- Tony says to Fegoli, "A doctor in the house? That's good, because somebody usually goes down at these affairs." In "The Sopranos", Tony had a panic attack while barbecuing.
- Tony is wearing shorts, even though the late Carmine told him, in "For All Debts Public and Private", "A don doesn't wear shorts."
- Paulie Gualtieri is called "Paulie Walnuts" by Tony B. This is only the second of two times that the nickname is used in the show, the first being by the bad stand-up comedian in "Toodle-Fucking-Oo."

== Other cultural references ==
- The movie Junior is watching when Bobby enters is the Fellini film, La Dolce Vita. Junior references the opening scene, in which a statue of Jesus is flown over Rome by helicopter, with the comment: "You could tell it was a dummy!"
- When Tony arrives at the house for Hugh's party, he responds to Carmela's complaints about his tardiness by reciting, "Pins and needles, needles and pins." This is a line from a ditty frequently recited by Ralph Kramden in The Honeymooners, which in turn references the nursery rhyme: "Needles and pins, Needles and pins. When a Man marries his Trouble begins."
- Johnny Sack buys a Maserati Coupé with Grigio Touring paint color, and takes Tony for a drive.
- When discussing his auto repairs, Phil says to Tony B, "You can sit in there till San Gennaro."
- It is mentioned that Carmela's parents live in West Orange, New Jersey.
- Lena Fegoli wrote in a Christmas letter about Papa Russ shaking hands with Andrew Cuomo on Flag Day. At the time, Cuomo had just ended his tenure as United States Secretary of Housing and Urban Development (1997–2001) and had lost the 2002 New York gubernatorial election.
- Dr Russ has a doctorate in international relations from Princeton University, paid for by the G. I. Bill. It can be presumed that his doctorate was in the Princeton School of Public and International Affairs, then named the Woodrow Wilson School.
- At Angelo's urging, Tony B does a Jackie Gleason impersonation for Rusty, who does not seem to be impressed. Angelo compares himself and Tony B to Frick and Frack.
- Angelo, Rusty Millio, and Tony B meet at The Four Seasons Restaurant, a subtle nod to The Four Seasons (band) of which Frankie Valli (the entertainer who plays Rusty Millio) was the lead singer.
- The sign for the Bada Bing says "Holyfield vs Lewis, Sat Nov 13." This is a reference to the rematch between heavyweight champions Evander Holyfield and Lennox Lewis, which took place on 13 November 1999.
- The shotgun Tony gives to Hugh is a Beretta Giubileo over-under 12 gauge shotgun with hand-engraved sideplates, a straight stock, and 28-inch barrels. Finn jokingly mistakes the case for a Stratocaster.
- One man reminisces about Hugo throwing a cherry bomb at a German American Bund meeting in Paterson, New Jersey.
- When Tony B asks Tony if there is any other work he can do besides airbags, he says, "I'm a team player, I'm Charlie Hustle." This is a reference to the former Major League Baseball player Pete Rose.
- Tony B mentions he will go to Grand Union but Carmela says "it has been closed for 10 years".

== Music ==
- The song on the radio in the opening scene is Mason Williams' "Classical Gas".
- The song playing on Sal Vitro's radio as he tends to Johnny Sack's garden is "Come Go With Me" by The Del-Vikings.
- One of the songs played at Hugh's birthday party is "Bandstand Boogie," best known as the original theme of American Bandstand.
- Another song played at the party is "Cherry Pink (and Apple Blossom White)" by Perez Prado.
- The song played toward the end of the party while Tony S is talking to Tony B is "Allegheny Moon" by Patti Page.
- The song being played on saxophone when the party is closing is "Stardust" by Hoagy Carmichael.
- Toward the end of the episode, as Joey Peeps is about to leave the brothel with a prostitute, Bon Jovi's "Wanted Dead or Alive" (from 1986's Slippery When Wet album) is playing in the background.
- The song playing when Tony Blundetto kills Joey Peeps, and which continues over the end credits, is "Bad 'n' Ruin" by Faces, sung by Rod Stewart, from their 1971 album Long Player (it is also played at the Bada Bing! when Tony Soprano and Tony Blundetto have their meeting).

== Reception ==
Television Without Pity graded "Marco Polo" with a B, criticizing the washing machine installation scene as covert product placement.

For The Star-Ledger, Alan Sepinwall praised Edie Falco's "Marco?" line in the Marco Polo pool scene as having humorous delivery that expressed "[f]rustration, pathos, sarcasm, love and affection" all at once.

Italian studies professor Franco Ricci noted the symbolism in the scene where Uncle Junior watches La dolce vita on television, as La dolce vita has a "plot about unrequited love and impossible happiness" that echoes the "constant bickering between Tony and Carmela". Furthermore, Junior's comment about not understanding La dolce vita illustrates a "heritage gap between American Italians and Italians."
