= Jersey Guy =

- Directed by: Elia Zois
- Screenplay by: Elia Zois; Chris Zois
- Produced by: Roosey Khawly
- Starring: Steve Parlavecchio; Arthur J. Nascarella; Stacie Mistysyn
- Edited by: Charlie Sadoff
- Production company: Jersey Guy Films
- Distributed by: Castle Hill Productions
- Release date: April 25, 2003
- Running time: 90 minutes
- Country: United States
- Language: English

Jersey Guy is a 2003 American comedy-drama film directed by Elia Zois and starring Steve Parlavecchio, Arthur J. Nascarella and Stacie Mistysyn.

== Cast ==
- Steve Parlavecchio as Jack
- Arthur J. Nascarella as Father
- Ralph Caputo as Merle
- Stacie Mistysyn as Susan
- Tom Borillo as George
- Jill Wolfe as Samantha

== Production ==
The film was shot in 2000.

== Reception ==
The film has a 0% rating on Rotten Tomatoes.
