= Chris Zois =

American screenwriter

Christ L. Zois
- Occupations: Author, screenwriter, former psychiatrist
- Writing career
- Genres: Self-help, independent

Chris L. Zois (commonly known as Chris Zois) is an American author of two short-term therapy books.

== Early life and education ==
Zois graduated from Rutgers University in New Jersey in 1963 with a major in philosophy. He obtained his medical degree from New York Medical College and completed a residency in psychiatry at New York Hospital.

== Career ==
=== Writer ===
Zois is the author of two books on short-term therapy: Think Like a Shrink, a self-help book published by Warner Books; and a textbook, Short Term Therapy Techniques, published by Jason Aronson Publishers.

=== Medicine ===
Zois has been on the teaching faculty of three medical schools, founded the New York Center for Short Term Psychotherapy, and contributed articles on short-term therapy to journals.

In 2011, his license to practice medicine in New Jersey was revoked .

== Bibliography ==
=== Books ===
- Think Like a Shrink: Solve Your Problems Yourself with Short Term Therapy Techniques by Christ L. Zois (1992) ISBN 0-446-39256-1
- Short-Term Therapy Techniques by Christ L. Zois (1997) ISBN 0-7657-0026-3
- Life Guard by Chris Zois (2014) published by Capricci Editions, Paris. ISBN 9791023900002

=== Games ===
- Think Like a Shrink (iPhone)

=== Films ===
- The Blackout (1997)
- New Rose Hotel (1998)
- Jersey Guy (2003)
- Chelsea on the Rocks (2008)
- Welcome to New York (2014)
- Siberia (2020)
