= The Shoemaker =

Play written by Susan Charlotte

- Original language: English
- Written by: Susan Charlotte
- Characters: The Shoemaker; Hilary; Louise; Offstage Voices
- Genre: Drama
- Setting: Hell's Kitchen, New York City

Premiere
- Date: July 24, 2011
- Place: The Acorn Theatre; New York City, New York
- Directed by: Antony Marsellis

The Shoemaker is a play written by Susan Charlotte, first staged at the off-Broadway Acorn Theater on 24 July 2011. The play was directed by Antony Marsellis and starred Danny Aiello as The Shoemaker, Alma Cuervo as Hilary, Lucy Devito as Louise and Michael Twaine providing Offstage Voices.

== Production history ==
The Shoemaker was first produced at the Acorn Theatre in New York City on 24 July 2011. It was directed by Antony Marsellis. The cast was as follows:

- The Shoemaker - Danny Aiello
- Hilary - Alma Cuervo
- Louise - Lucy Devito
- Offstage Voices - Michael Twaine
