= A Brooklyn State of Mind =

- Directed by: Frank Rainone
- Cinematography: Ken Kelsch
- Music by: Paul Zaza
- Release date: 1997
- Country: United States

A Brooklyn State of Mind is a 1997 American crime drama film written and directed by Frank Rainone.

== Plot ==
A young man learns the truth about his father's death.

== Cast ==
- Vincent Spano: Al Stanco
- Maria Grazia Cucinotta: Gabriela
- Danny Aiello: Danny Parente
- Abe Vigoda: Uncle Guy
- Rick Aiello: Nicky Vetrino
  - Leonard Spinelli: Young Nicky Vetrino
- Tony Danza: Louie Crisci
- Jennifer Esposito: Donna Delgrosso
- Morgana King: Aunt Rose
- Vincent Pastore: Vinnie "D"
- Jamie-Lynn Sigler: Young Angie
- Arthur Nascarella: Building Inspector
