= Dellaventura =

- Genre: Crime drama
- Created by: Richard DiLello; Julian Neil; Bernard L. Nussbaumer
- Starring: Danny Aiello; Rick Aiello; Byron Keith Minns; Anne Ramsay
- Composer: Joe Delia
- Country of origin: United States
- Original language: English
- No. of seasons: 1
- No. of episodes: 14 (1 unaired)

Production
- Executive producers: Richard Di Lello; Danny Aiello
- Running time: 60 minutes
- Production company: Rysher Entertainment

Original release
- Network: CBS
- Release: September 23, 1997 – January 13, 1998

Dellaventura is an American crime drama television series created by Richard Di Lello, Julian Neil and Bernard L. Nussbaumer, that aired on CBS from September 23, 1997, to January 13, 1998. The show was based on the life of NYPD detective Anthony Dellaventura.

== Premise ==
A former NYPD detective now works as a private detective, taking on cases in which the bureaucratic legal system has failed.

== Cast ==
- Danny Aiello as Anthony Dellaventura
- Rick Aiello as Teddy Naples
- Byron Keith Minns as Jonas Deeds
- Anne Ramsay as Geri Zarias

== Episodes ==
No.	Title	Directed by	Written by	Original release date
1	"Above Reproach"	Peter Levin	Frank Abatemarco	September 23, 1997
The career of a future DA is threatened by an ex-con. Also stars James Russo and Ellen Greene.
2	"Pilot"	Michael Dinner	Richard DiLello	September 30, 1997
A woman wants Dellaventura to trap the man who raped her. Also stars Stephen Lang and Lucy Liu.
3	"Music of the Night"	Rick Rosenthal	Michael Cole Dinelli	October 7, 1997
Dellaventura wants to prove that a recording executive murdered a singer, and a man wants Dellaventura to find the woman he met on the subway. Guest stars include Novella Nelson, Sharrieff Pugh, Erin Daniels, Shiek Mahmud-Bey and Scott Cohen.
4	"Joe Fallon's Daughter"	Michael Dinner	Story by : J.J. Valcoeur; Teleplay by : J.J. Valcoeur & Frank Abatemarco	October 14, 1997
A cop friend of Dellaventura was murdered and Dellaventura works to clear his name after $47,000 was found in his locker. Also stars James Handy, Nadia Dajani and Nestor Serrano.
5	"Clean Slate"	Robert Mandel	Tom Towler	October 21, 1997
A friend of Dellaventura who was a U.S. Marshal is found murdered. Also stars Olek Krupa, Elizabeth Wilson, Mary Mara and Jude Ciccolella.
6	"Fathers"	Chuck Bowman	Joe Viola	October 28, 1997
Dellaventura is reunited with his daughter after many years. Gimmez Ruiz (Antone Pagan) is murdered in the episode and Dellaventura goes to his wake to investigate. A priest asks Dellaventura for help when ex-gang members are accused of murder. Also stars Frank Pellegrino, Rafael Baez, Jack Gwaltney and Wendy Makkena.
7	"Hell's Kitchen"	Alan J. Levi	Richard Vetere	November 4, 1997
Dellaventura helps an ex-con who was forced into taking part in a robbery. Also stars Erik Jensen, John Costelloe and Ritchie Coster.
8	"In Deadly Fashion"	Sandy Smolan	Jack LoGiudice	December 2, 1997
A fashion designer is threatened when she agrees to go along with her business partner's shady business practice. Also stars Paul Calderón, Martin Moran, Paul Schulze, Sebastian Roché and Elizabeth Peña.
9	"With a Vengeance"	Danny Aiello III	Michael Cole Dinelli	December 9, 1997
Stars Vincent Pastore, Markos De Mayo, Alix Elias and Kathrine Narducci.
10	"Dreamers"	John D. Hancock	David Assael	December 16, 1997
Someone is keeping a racehorse from winning. Also stars Rebecca Harrell Tickell, Melanie Norris, Tony Darrow and Sándor Técsy.
11	"The Biggest Miracle"	Donna Deitch	Tom Towler & Richard Vetere	December 30, 1997
The crew goes undercover to find out who is stealing toys from a toy store. Dellaventura helps a boy find his father and a candle in the church is spontaneously lighting. Also stars Robert Klein, Molly Price, Tom Gilroy, Walt MacPherson and Peter Maloney.
12	"David and Goliath"	Dan Lerner	Story by : Lorenzo Carcaterra; Teleplay by : Joe Viola	January 6, 1998
Dellaventura tries to prove that a man with cancer has been wrongfully imprisoned. Also stars Joseph Cortese, Julianne Nicholson, Irma St. Paule, John Rothman, Thomas Ryan and Fred Weller.
13	"Made in America"	James Quinn	Richard Vetere & Peyton Webb	January 13, 1998
A woman's mother disappears. A young couple from two different cultures are having problems with their parents. Also stars Doris Belack, Debra Monk, George DiCenzo, Henry Yuk, Caitlin Clarke, Deedee Magno Hall and Wai Ching Ho.
14	"The Human Factor"	Danny Aiello III	Frank Abatemarco	UNAIRED
Stars Scott Bryce, Joanna Wolff, Isabel Glasser and Edward James Hyland.

== Reception ==
Dellaventura was described as "essentially a rip-off" of The Equalizer.

A review in the TV Guide noted:

As the tough-talking, larger-than-life private eye, Aiello redefines the concept of swaggering, and that voice-over narration ("Sometimes things have a way of working themselves out. Sometimes they don't. This time they did.") has to be heard to be believed. But the big problem -- at least in the pilot -- is that Dellaventura and his gang are so infallible and self-assured that the viewer never doubts that good will vanquish evil. There's simply no suspense. Imagine The Equalizer without a single thrill.
