= Susan Charlotte =

American dramatist

- Born: 1954 (age 71–72); New York, New York, United States
- Education: Columbia University
- Occupations: Author, playwright, screenwriter,
- Writing career
- Notable works: Love Divided By; The Shoemaker

Susan Charlotte (born July 21, 1954) is an American playwright, screenwriter and author.

Best known as a playwright, Charlotte was the inaugural recipient of the Joseph Kesselring Prize. She is the author of such plays as The Shoemaker, Love Divided By/Times Three and Did You Know My Husband? She is also a screenwriter whose films include: A Broken Sole and Come On. Charlotte has written for CBS, PBS and Lifetime TV. She is the author of two critically acclaimed books. She is the founding artistic director of the award-winning theatre company Food For Thought Productions and the non-profit theatre company Cause Celebre Productions. She has also been a Film and Theatre professor at Columbia University, CUNY, and NYU.

== Career ==
=== Theatre ===
She has written fifteen full-length plays and fifty one-acts. Her plays, which have been produced for over thirty years, include: the 2011 Off-Broadway premiere of The Shoemaker starring Danny Aiello and directed by Antony Marsellis, who also directed the film version entitled Something Like That with Danny Aiello. Her play The Hairdresser, which has enjoyed multiple productions, starred Kathleen Chalfant, Maria Tucci, Louise Lasser and Steven Schetzner.

She also founded a school for writers, Prism Playhouse Inc. and two theatre companies—Food For Thought Productions (winner of the National Arts Club Gold Medal in drama) where she premiered plays by Tennessee Williams, Tony Kushner and Lynn Redgrave and the not-for-profit theatre, Cause Celebre Productions.

=== Film ===
Her film credits include: A Broken Sole, which was theatrically released in 2007 and directed by Antony Marsellis, starred Danny Aiello, Margaret Colin, Bob Dishy, Judith Light, Laila Robins, and John Shea. Come On, premiered at the Hamptons International Film Festival in 2000. Love Divided By (based on her play) with original music by Philip Glass, was chosen to open MoMA's Titus II theatre.

=== Television ===
Her TV credits include: CBS' "Comedy Zone" (1984), which starred Patty Duke and Paul Reiser, the daytime series "Loving" (1983), "Guiding Light", and PBS' "Did You Know My Husband?" (2018) with Carole Shelley and Louise Lasser. In addition, She has written for Lifetime TV.

=== Books ===
She has written two critically acclaimed books, "Creativity: Conversations with 28 Who Excel" and "Creativity in Film: Conversations with 14 Who Excel".

== Awards ==
She is the recipient of the inaugural Joseph Kesselring Prize. Her theatre company Food For Thought Productions was the recipient of the National Arts Club Gold Medal of Honor for Achievement in the Dramatic Arts.

== List of works ==
=== Full-Length Plays Include ===
- The Shoemaker
- Prism Blues
- Delicate Choices
- It Takes One Litre of Petrol and Twenty Minutes
- Before It Happened
- Love Divided By/Times Three
- Sublet
- The Round Table (Collaboration with Peter Stone)

=== One-Act Plays Include ===
- Love Divided By
- Folded Hands
- Tango Finish
- The Shoemaker
- The Cabbie
- The Dyslexic Lover
- The Hairdresser
- Come On
- The Typist
- The Neon Sign Man
- I Can Imagine/I Can't Imagine
- The Squeegee Man
- Life in a Paper Bag
- The Pirates (Co-Written by Pascal Aubier)
- Between a Local and an Express
- What She Didn't Say
- The Cleaning Girl

=== Theatrical Adaptations Include ===
- When The Women Come Out To Dance by Elmore Leonard
- Sparks by Elmore Leonard
- The Rocking Horse Winner by D.H. Lawrence
- Youth by Joseph Conrad
- The Wall by Jean-Paul Sartre
- The Yellow Wallpaper by Charlotte Perkins
- The Lottery by Shirley Jackson

=== Films Include ===
- A Broken Sole
- Something Like That
- Come On
- Out of Your Hands

=== Television Include ===
- "The Comedy Zone"
- "Loving"
- "Guiding Light"
- "Dr. Ruth"
- "Did You Know My Husband?"
