= Killer Fish =

1979 film directed by Antonio Margheriti

- Original movie poster
- Directed by: Antonio Margheriti
- Written by: Michael Rogers
- Produced by: Alex Ponti
- Starring: Lee Majors; Karen Black; Margaux Hemingway; Marisa Berenson; James Franciscus
- Cinematography: Alberto Spagnoli
- Edited by: Cesare D'Amico
- Music by: Guido De Angelis; Maurizio De Angelis
- Production companies: Fawcett-Majors Productions; Victoria Productions; Filmar do Brasil
- Distributed by: Paris Filmes; ITC Entertainment
- Release date: 7 December 1979
- Running time: 101 minutes
- Countries: Italy; United States; United Kingdom; France; Brazil
- Languages: English; Portuguese; Italian

Killer Fish is a 1979 Italian (Note: Production) (Note: Directing, cinematography, music)-American (Note: Casting)-British-French (Note: Distribution)-Brazilian (Note: Location, initial release) horror film directed by Antonio Margheriti.

== Plot ==
The mastermind behind a precision theft of priceless emeralds decides to hide the jewels at the bottom of a reservoir he has secretly stocked with savage deadly piranha. Retrieving the gems turns out to be a caper in itself since the group is now torn by suspicion and jealousy. Several gang members try to recover the loot on their own, only to become screaming victims of the insatiable horde of killer fish. The treasure is down there just waiting to be brought up. To get them, everyone must face the inescapable terror of thousands of man-eating creatures.

== Cast ==
- Lee Majors as Robert Lasky
- Karen Black as Kate Neville
- Margaux Hemingway as Gabrielle
- Marisa Berenson as Ann
- James Franciscus as Paul Diller
- Roy Brocksmith as Ollie
- Dan Pastorini as Hans
- Frank Pesce as Warren Bailey
- Anthony Steffen as Max
- Fábio Sabag as Quintin
- Gary Collins as Tom

== Filming ==
The film was made on location in the city of Angra dos Reis, Rio de Janeiro, Brazil.

== Reception ==
The Monthly Film Bulletin stated that the film "appears to have a greater budget than Piranha" and that it "exhibits considerably less imagination". Vincent Canby of The New York Times stated that the film "may not be a good movie — it's really inept—but it's friendly, like Mr. Majors's quizzical squint, which is, I'm told by people who watch more television than I do, what Mr. Majors does best. Everyone, in fact, carries on gamely, as people do at a picnic when it rains."

== Legacy ==
The film is one of six movies featured in Season 12 of Mystery Science Theater 3000: The Gauntlet.

The film was broadcast on Tele 5 as part of the programme format SchleFaZ in season 1.
