= Reach Me =

- Promotional poster
- Directed by: John Herzfeld
- Written by: John Herzfeld
- Produced by: Rebekah Chaney; Cassian Elwes; Buddy Patrick; John Herzfeld
- Starring: Danny Aiello; Tom Berenger; Lauren Cohan; Kevin Connolly; Terry Crews; Cary Elwes; Kelsey Grammer; Omari Hardwick; Elizabeth Henstridge; Thomas Jane; Ryan Kwanten; Nelly; David O'Hara; Kyra Sedgwick; Tom Sizemore; Sylvester Stallone; Danny Trejo
- Cinematography: Vern Nobles
- Edited by: Scott Boyd; Steven Cohen
- Music by: Tree Adams
- Production company: Seraphim Films Productions
- Distributed by: Millennium Entertainment
- Release date: November 21, 2014
- Running time: 95 minutes
- Country: United States
- Language: English
- Budget: $5 million

Reach Me is a 2014 American drama film directed and written by John Herzfeld. The film stars Sylvester Stallone, Kyra Sedgwick, Terry Crews, Thomas Jane, Kevin Connolly, Lauren Cohan, Kelsey Grammer, and Tom Berenger. The film was produced by Rebekah Chaney, Cassian Elwes, Buddy Patrick, John Herzfeld.

The plot revolves around how a self-help book inspires a diverse group of people: journalist Roger King and his editor Gerald, former inmate Colette, hip-hop mogul E-Ruption, actress Eve and undercover cop Detective Wolfe. The creation of Reach Me was influenced as least partly by Herzfeld's memories of seeing televangelist Reverend Ike and reading Napoleon Hill's self-help book Think and Grow Rich, although Herzfeld says the film is "not about getting rich, but believing in yourself."

== Cast ==
- Sylvester Stallone as Gerald
- Kyra Sedgwick as Collette
- Thomas Jane as "Wolfie"
- Lauren Cohan as Kate
- Kelsey Grammer as Angelo Aldo Brandini
- Kevin Connolly as Roger King
- Tom Berenger as Teddy
- Nelly as "E-Ruption"
- Omari Hardwick as Dominic
- Terry Crews as Wilson
- Danny Trejo as Victor "Vic"
- Danny Aiello as Father Paul
- Ryan Kwanten as Jack Burns
- David O'Hara as "Thumper"
- Elizabeth Henstridge as Eve
- Rebekah Chaney as Denise-Denise
- Chuck Zito as Joe
- Tom Sizemore as Frank
- Cary Elwes as Kersey
- Scarlet Stallone as Young Girl

== Production ==
To build a solid cast for the movie, John Herzfeld started with Sylvester Stallone; the two had been friends since they were roommates together as students at University of Miami. After Stallone committed to participate, other actors agreed to join the cast at minimum pay rates. Herzfeld recruited another long-time friend, Danny Aiello, to play the role of mobster Frank – but after Aiello declined that role, Herzfeld and Aiello collaborated on creating the character of Father Paul. Aiello credits his work on Reach Me with aiding his emotional recovery from the death of his son, Danny Aiello III.

While inviting friends' participation in Reach Me, Herzfeld also enlisted close relatives of participants: Herzfeld's wife, Rebekah Chaney, joined as co-producer and cast member. Stallone's youngest daughter, Scarlet, had her acting debut in Reach Me, although she described the experience as "pretty humiliating" because she "just had to say one tiny line, and they had to cut that in half."

During principal photography in 2013, funding for the film dried up when one of the investors, Norman Zada, backed out and sued for return of US$1,000,000. Herzfeld, Stallone and producers Rebekah Chaney and Cassian Elwes started a Kickstarter campaign to raise their goal of US$250,000 by September 19. Despite reaching the US$250,000 goal on Kickstarter, the production team decided to withdraw its Kickstarter campaign and start again with the competing crowdfunding platform Indiegogo, citing its broader and more flexible capabilities. The Indiegogo campaign set a goal for US$50,000 starting on September 17 and ended on September 22 with a total of US$178,640. Total production costs for the film are estimated at US$5,000,000.

== Marketing ==
The first official trailer for Reach Me was released on July 7, 2014, and the second official trailer was released on September 25, 2014.

== Reception ==
The film holds a 4% approval rating on Rotten Tomatoes based on 24 reviews, with an average rating of 3.2/10. The website's critics consensus reads: "Featuring a bewildering array of talented actors pummeled by disjointed direction and a dull, hackneyed script, Reach Me is so fundamentally misbegotten that its title reads more like a threat." At Metacritic, which assigns a weighted average score out of 100 to reviews from mainstream critics, the film received an average score of 21% based on 14 reviews.

== See also ==
- Grand Canyon
- Magnolia
- Third Person
- Crash
