= Danny Aiello III =

American actor

- Born: Daniel Louis Aiello III; January 27, 1957; The Bronx, New York, U.S.
- Died: May 1, 2010 (aged 53); Hillsdale, New Jersey, U.S.
- Occupations: Actor; stuntman; director
- Years active: 1979–2010
- Spouse: Cindy Lamb (m. 2001)
- Children: 2
- Father: Danny Aiello
- Relatives: Michael Kay (cousin)
- Family: Rick Aiello (brother)

Daniel Louis Aiello III (January 27, 1957 – May 1, 2010) was an American stunt performer, stunt coordinator, director, and actor in film and television.

He was the son of actor Danny Aiello. He doubled as his father in a number of films, such as Ruby, Hudson Hawk, and Do the Right Thing.

== Death ==
Aiello died of pancreatic cancer, at the age of 53, in Hillsdale, New Jersey, on May 1, 2010.
