= Arthur J. Nascarella =

American actor (born 1944)

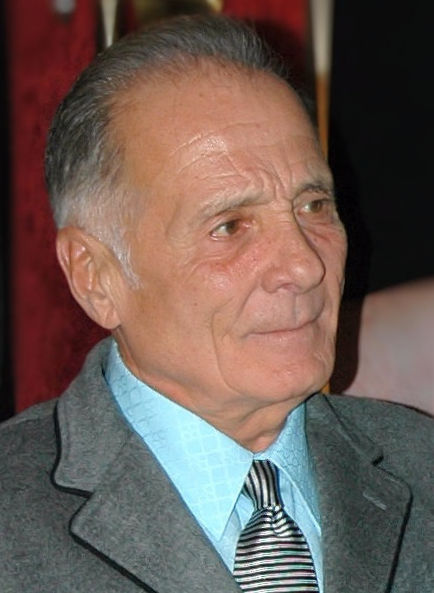
- Nascarella in 2012
- Born: November 18, 1944 (age 81); Suffolk County, New York, U.S.
- Other names: Arthur Nascarella, Arthur Valero
- Occupation: Actor
- Years active: 1994–present

Arthur J. Nascarella (born November 18, 1944) is an American actor who has appeared in dozens of films, most often playing a mobster or police officer. Among his notable film credits include a corrupt cop in Cop Land (1997), the hypocritical ambulance Captain Barney in Martin Scorsese's film Bringing Out the Dead (1999) and fed-up casino boss, Nicky "Fingers" Bonnatto in The Cooler (2003). He is perhaps best known for playing the fictional mobster and caporegime Carlo Gervasi in the hit television series The Sopranos. He appeared in 28 episodes from 2002 to 2007.

== Career ==
Nascarella served eight years in the United States Marine Corps, and was a member of the New York City Police Department for 21 years.

He is one of Spike Lee's most frequent collaborators, having worked with him in New Jersey Drive (1995), Clockers (1995), Girl 6 (1996), He Got Game (1998), Summer of Sam (1999), Bamboozled (2000), and BlacKkKlansman (2018). He also appeared and played roles in the films The Ref (1994), Witness to the Mob (1998), Happiness (1998), 54 (1998), Enemy of the State (1998), Knockaround Guys (2001), In the Cut (2003), Running Scared (2006), World Trade Center (2006), Solitary Man (2009), and Man on a Ledge (2012).

He also had a small part as the yacht-owning bootlegger Louie Gavotte in the 2001 USA Network television film After the Storm. He appears on the Showtime series Billions as a local pizza shop owner named Bruno.

== Filmography ==
=== Film ===
Year	Title	Role	Notes
1993	Hu xue tu long zhi hong tian xian jing	FBI director	
1994	Minges Alley	Caesar Falvo	
1994	The Ref	State Trooper	
1994	Hand Gun	Police Sergeant	
1994	Who Do I Gotta Kill?	Distraught Wiseguy	
1995	New Jersey Drive	Mr. Chop Shop	
1995	Closer to Home	Bartender	
1995	Clockers	Bartucci	
1995	Pictures of Baby Jane Doe	Bianchi	
1996	Girl 6	Boss #2	
1996	No Exit	Jimmy 'Cabs'	
1997	Grind	Factory Foreman	
1997	A Brother's Kiss	Lex's Father	
1997	Fall	Anthony the Maitre D'	
1997	A Gun for Jennifer	Lt. Rizzo	
1997	Cop Land	Frank Lagonda	
1998	A Brooklyn State of Mind	Building Inspector	
1998	He Got Game	Coach Cincotta	
1998	Happiness	Detective Berman	
1998	Harvest	DEA Agent	
1998	54	IRS Agent	
1998	Above Freezing	Khaleel	
1998	Enemy of the State	Frankie	
1998	Shock Television	Det. John Rizzo	
1999	On the Run	Irwin	
1999	Summer of Sam	Marlo	
1999	Bringing Out the Dead	Captain Barney	
2000	Raindrops	Dr. Waters	
2000	Bamboozled	Police Chief	
2001	Mourning Glory	Joey Fanelli	
2001	The Curse of the Jade Scorpion	Tom	
2001	Knockaround Guys	Billy Clueless	
2001	Kate & Leopold	Gracy	
2002	WiseGirls	Mr. Santalino	
2002	Unforeseen	Assassin	
2003	The Cooler	Nicky Fingers Bonnatto	
2003	Jersey Guy	Father	
2003	In the Cut	Captain Crosley	
2004	The Beautiful Country	Griff	
2005	Remedy	Detective Lynch	
2005	Searching for Bobby D	Matty	
2006	Running Scared	Frankie Perello	
2006	The Groomsmen	Mr. B	
2006	World Trade Center	Fire Chief at Ground Zero	
2006	Underdogs	Mason	
2008	Pistol Whipped	Bruno	
2008	Yonkers Joe	Dino	
2009	Solitary Man	Nascarella	
2010	Bronx Paradise	Tony Manfredi	
2011	The Grasslands	Detective Flynt	
2012	Man on a Ledge	Construction Worker	
2012	Mighty Fine	Lenny	
2012	Somebody's Hero	Donald Delansky	
2012	1,000 Times More Brutal	Frank Bonadello	
2015	The Wannabe	Chester	
2016	Little Men	Stu Gershman	Uncredited
2016	The Brooklyn Banker	Father Matteo	
2018	The Truth About Lies	James Lance	
2018	BlacKkKlansman	Officer Wheaton	
2018	Cabaret Maxime	Warren	
2019	Inside Game	Mr. M	

=== Television ===
Year	Title	Role	Notes
1994, 1996	New York Undercover	Vinny / Daniels	2 episodes
1996	Swift Justice	Grassi	Episode: "Pilot"
1996	On Seventh Avenue	Ugo the Italian	Television film
1996–2004	Law & Order	Various roles	3 episodes
1998	Witness to the Mob	Bruce Mouw	Television film
2001	After the Storm	Louie Gavotte	Television film
2002	The X-Files	Duke Tomasick	Episode: "Underneath"
2002–2007	The Sopranos	Carlo Gervasi	28 episodes
2004	The Jury	William Mussina	Episode: "The Boxer"
2007	The Bronx Is Burning	Tommy Lasorda	8 episodes
2009	Life on Mars	Rooney	Episode: "Revenge of Broken Jaw"
2009	Rescue Me	Ernie	Episode: "Play"
2010	Law & Order: SVU	Alberto Seraphine	Episode: "Beef"
2012	Unforgettable	Stefano Cioffi	Episode: "Allegiances"
2012	Person of Interest	Basile	Episode: "Flesh and Blood"
2013	Over/Under	Anthony	Television film
2016–2021	Billions	Bruno Capparello	11 episodes
2020	Blue Bloods	Dominic Reina	Episode: "Atonement"
2023-2025	Godfather of Harlem	Carlo Gambino	

== Awards ==
- National Board of Review Award for Best Acting by an Ensemble for Happiness (1998)
