= 4Chosen: The Documentary =

2008 film by Jon Doscher

- Film poster
- Directed by: Jon Doscher
- Starring: Johnnie L. Cochran Jr.; Wynton Marsalis; Peter Nufeld; Barry Scheck; Al Sharpton
- Narrated by: Montel Williams
- Cinematography: Craig Needelman
- Music by: Jonathan Hanser; Cindy Valentine Leone; Danny Reyes
- Production company: Starline Films
- Distributed by: Starline Pictures
- Release date: April 3, 2008 (Garden State)
- Country: United States
- Language: English

4CHOSEN: The Documentary is a 2008 documentary film narrated by Montel Williams. It was written and directed by Jon Doscher, and produced by Doscher and Fran Ganguzza.

The film is about the aftermath of an incident that occurred April 23, 1998, on the New Jersey Turnpike. Four young men (Danny Reyes, Keshon Moore, Rayshawn Brown, and Jarmaine Grant) from New York City were traveling on the turnpike on their way to a basketball talent showcase in North Carolina when they were pulled over by two state troopers and shot at thirteen times. Three of the young men were seriously injured, and the incident sparked conversations about police brutality as well as racial profiling.

== Summary ==
The film documents the court proceedings and the investigation of the New Jersey State Police. The four basketball players were represented by attorney David Ironman, and supported by Reverend Al Sharpton and Johnnie Cochran in a case that became known as "one of the largest racial profiling cases in American history".

== Reception ==
The film opened the 2008 Garden State Film Festival where the film won Best Documentary – Short. The film premiered at the Paramount Theater in Asbury Park.

Jon Doscher promoted the film on various outlets, including The Montel Williams Show and Quite Frankly with Stephen A. Smith.
