= 1st Shorty Awards =

Awards show for short-form social web media content

The 1st Annual Shorty Awards
- Date: February 11, 2009
- Location: Galapagos Art Space, New York City
- Hosted by: Rick Sanchez

The first Shorty Awards ceremony was held on February 11, 2009, at the Galapagos Art Space in Brooklyn, New York. Approximately 300 people attended the event. The event was hosted by CNN anchor Rick Sanchez and featured appearances by prominent Twitter users MC Hammer and Gary Vaynerchuk and a video appearance by Shaquille O'Neal. The awards, in 26 categories, were voted on by Twitter users.

== History ==
The Shorty Awards were created in 2008 by tech entrepreneurs Greg Galant, Adam Varga, and Lee Semel of Sawhorse Media. They invited Twitter account holders to nominate the best Twitter users in general categories such as humor, news, food, and design. Winners were chosen by more than 30,000 Twitter users during the voting period. The founders of Twitter first heard about the awards after the contest had gotten underway and expressed support for it.

== Winners ==
The first annual winners by category:

Category	Winner
Best in Advertising	Peggy Olson, @PeggyOlson
Best in Apps	brightkit, @brightkit
Best Brand	Action Wipes, @MarthaVan
Best in Business	Paw Luxury, @PawLuxury
Best in Design	Yiying Lu, @yiyinglu
Best in Education	RubyLearning, @RubyLearning
Best in Entertainment	Flashlight Worthy Books, @FLWBooks
Best in Finance	StockTwits, @StockTwits
Best in Food	Foodimentary, @foodimentary
Best in Green	green jaden @greenjaden on twitter
Best in Health	Debra Wendler, @ADHDParenting
Best in Humor	Charles Trippy, @charlestrippy
Best in Music	Hunter Burgan, @tranquilmammoth
Best in News	BNO News, @BreakingNewsOn
Best in Nonprofits	Athletes for a Cure, @athletes4acure
Best Personal	Arleen Boyd, @AlohaArleen
Best in Photography	Kyle Reese, @Twipphoto
Best in Politics	Justin Hart, @justin_hart
Best in Science	NASA's Phoenix Mars Lander, @MarsPhoenix
Best in Social Media	Dan Zarrella, @danzarrella
Best in Sports	Jackie, @girlwithnoname
Best in Startups	Hanniversary, @hanniversary
Best in Tech	Twitter Tips, @Twitter_Tips
Best in Travel	Cruise Source, @cruisesource
Best in Video Games	Justin McElroy, @justinmcelroy
Best in Weird	Martin Sargent, @martinsargent
