= Today Trader =

Educational hub

Today Trader, Inc
- Industry: Finance
- Founded: 2008
- Founder: Steve Gomez and Andy Lindloff
- Headquarters: Frankfurt am Main, Germany
- Area served: World wide
- Owner: Michael Hebenstreit; CEO
- Website: todaytrader.com

Today Trader, Inc is a trading and education service that started in 2008. As of 2013, trading with their service is done primarily through their relationship with the Ditto Trade online brokerage service. Since 2018, the venture serves as an educational hub.

== History ==
Steve Gomez and Andy Lindloff met at a Level 2 trading seminar when they were both working as floor traders in 1998. Today Trader, Inc was started in 2008 when Gomez and Lindloff began sharing their desktops with other traders through GoToMeeting. This service was available as a subscription for active day traders.

The day trading transparency and education provided by Today Trader was unique and they were early adopters in 2010. The company utilized many social media resources to crowdsource ideas and share their ideas including YouTube, Twitter, and StockTwits.

Following the article in The New York Times, the company was approached by Brian Lund to consider becoming a "Lead Trader" with the online brokerage service Ditto Trade. Ditto Trade allows people to follow the Today Trader Lead Trader account and be included in every trade or trade alongside these "master traders" from trade alerts. In 2011, the company was performing approximately thirty transactions per month. These trades are primarily day and swing trading transactions. The service was launched later in 2010 and has been outperforming the S&P 500 since that time.

Gomez was interviewed by CNBC reporter Jane Wells after he sold a portion of his silver holdings in 2011.

On September 20, 2012, the Today Trader team discontinued their live trading service in favor of their relationship with Ditto Trade. They offer trading classes online to learn their specialized trading technique called "swing scalping". Gomez and Lindloff have also published on the importance on money management for traders.

Gomez was listed as one of the "Top 5 Trading Guru's of 2013" by Trader Robotics.

In March 2018 Michael Hebenstreit, a stock broker from Germany, acquired Today Trader and converted the venture into an educational hub offering content and services for professional traders and students who want to learn trading.

== Controversy ==
The Today Trader live trading service brought attention to the field of day trading. The Motley Fool author Rich Greifner argued that the day trading lifestyle and results described in The New York Times article was "impressive" but questioned the accuracy of the claim as well as offering that these results were "hardly indicative of the typical day trader's experience".

In a follow-up post, StockTwits founder Howard Lindzon described his dislike of the term "day trader" describing it as "tired" similar to the term "journalist". He also noted that traders Gomez "keep moving forward and adapt" to the current market conditions.
