= 59th Primetime Emmy Awards =

2007 American television programming awards

- Promotional poster
- Date: September 16, 2007 (Ceremony); September 8, 2007 (Creative Arts Awards)
- Location: Shrine Auditorium, Los Angeles, California
- Presented by: Academy of Television Arts and Sciences
- Hosted by: Ryan Seacrest

Highlights
- Most awards: Major: Broken Trail; Prime Suspect: The Final Act; The Sopranos; Tony Bennett: An American Classic (3); All: Tony Bennett: An American Classic (7)
- Most nominations: The Sopranos (10)
- Outstanding Comedy Series: 30 Rock
- Outstanding Drama Series: The Sopranos
- Outstanding Miniseries: Broken Trail
- Outstanding Reality-Competition Program: The Amazing Race
- Outstanding Variety, Music or Comedy Series: The Daily Show with Jon Stewart
- Website: http://www.emmys.com/

Television/radio coverage
- Network: Fox
- Produced by: Ken Ehrlich
- Directed by: Bruce Gowers

The 59th Primetime Emmy Awards were held on Sunday, September 16, 2007, honoring the best in U.S. prime time television programming at the Shrine Auditorium in Los Angeles, California. The ceremony was televised live on Fox at 8:00 p.m. EDT for the first time in high definition (on tape delay three hours later on the West Coast of the United States at 8:00 p.m.). It was also the most recent Primetime Emmy Awards ceremony to be held at the Shrine Auditorium, as it was then relocated to the Nokia Theatre from the following year (PDT/3:00 UTC). The ceremony was hosted by Ryan Seacrest. 28 competitive awards were presented.

The ceremonies were supposed to be produced by Nigel Lythgoe and Ken Warwick, executive producers of American Idol, but because of their heavy work load with Idol, Ken Ehrlich, last year's producer, resumed the producer's role for the fourth time. Ratings plunged further down to a near an all-time low as an estimate 12.87 million, 19% lower than the past year, making it the second smallest television audience in Emmy history, behind the 1990 telecast.

The nominations were announced on July 19 at 5:40 a.m. PDT (12:40 UTC) by Jon Cryer and Kyra Sedgwick.

Meanwhile, the Creative Arts Emmy Awards ceremony, hosted by comedian-actor Carlos Mencia, were presented eight days earlier on September 9.

Freshman series 30 Rock defeated defending champion The Office to claim Outstanding Comedy Series; this was the only major award for 30 Rock.

Going into its final ceremony, The Sopranos needed just three major awards to tie the drama series record of 18 major wins set by Hill Street Blues. It was nominated in ten major categories coming in and ended the night with three wins, including its second win for Outstanding Drama Series. This tied the record and gave both shows identical résumés—18 major wins and 74 major nominations. This win for The Sopranos was also the first time any show's sixth season had won for the Outstanding Drama award, later achieved by Game of Thrones as well, another HBO drama.

AMC, a smaller cable network, won big with Broken Trail winning three Emmys. It won Outstanding Miniseries and the network's first Acting wins, for the series' stars, Thomas Haden Church and Robert Duvall.

As of 2026, this is the last year where ABC, CBS, FOX, and NBC received the majority of the Drama Series nominations.

== Winners and nominees ==
Winners are listed first and highlighted in bold:

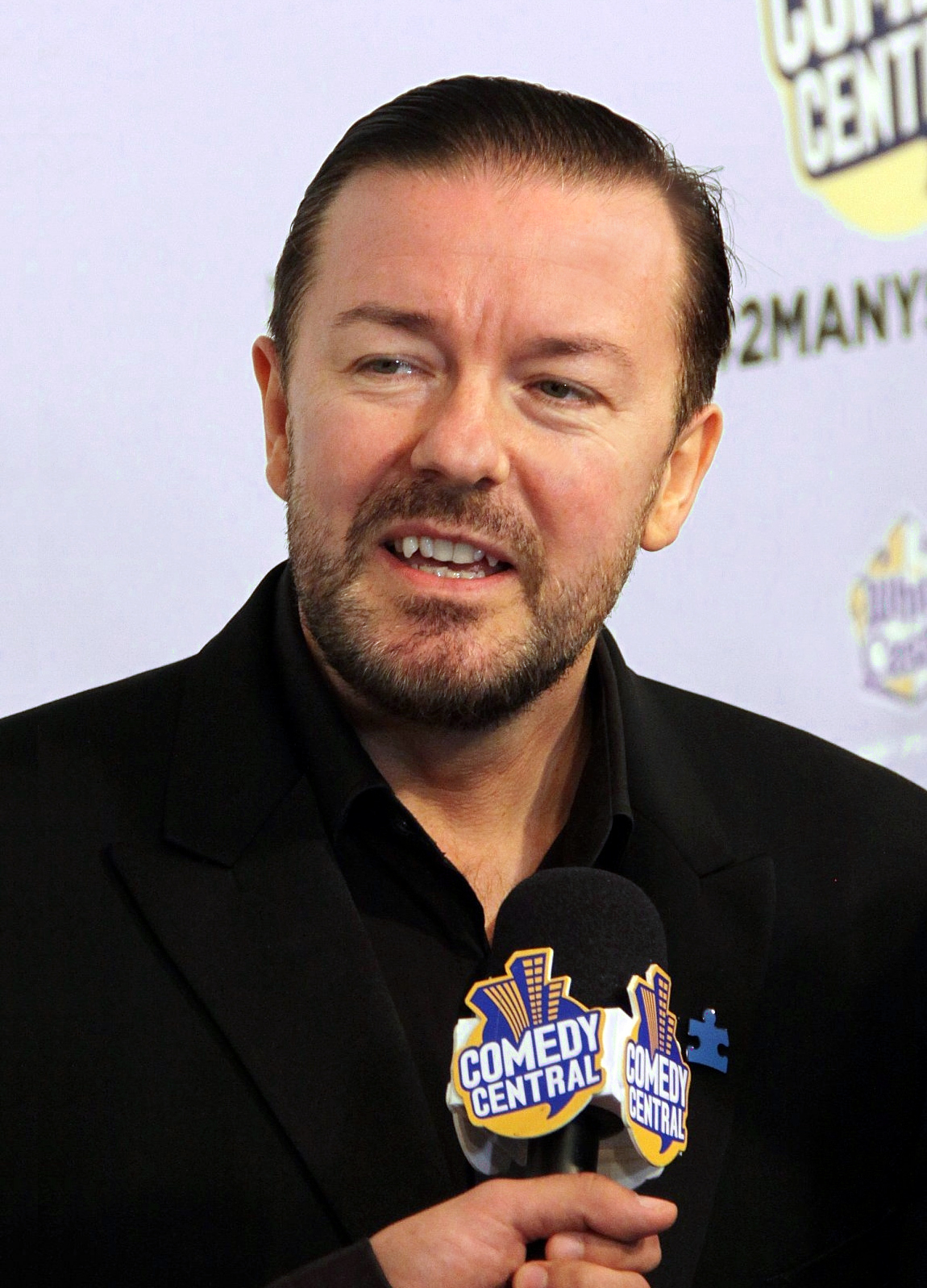
Ricky Gervais, Outstanding Lead Actor in a Comedy Series winner

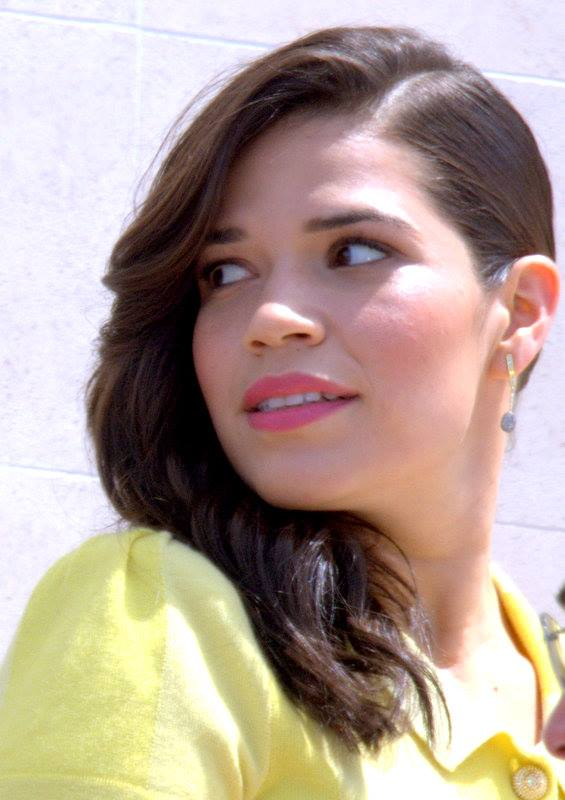
America Ferrera, Outstanding Lead Actress in a Comedy Series winner, first Latin woman to do so

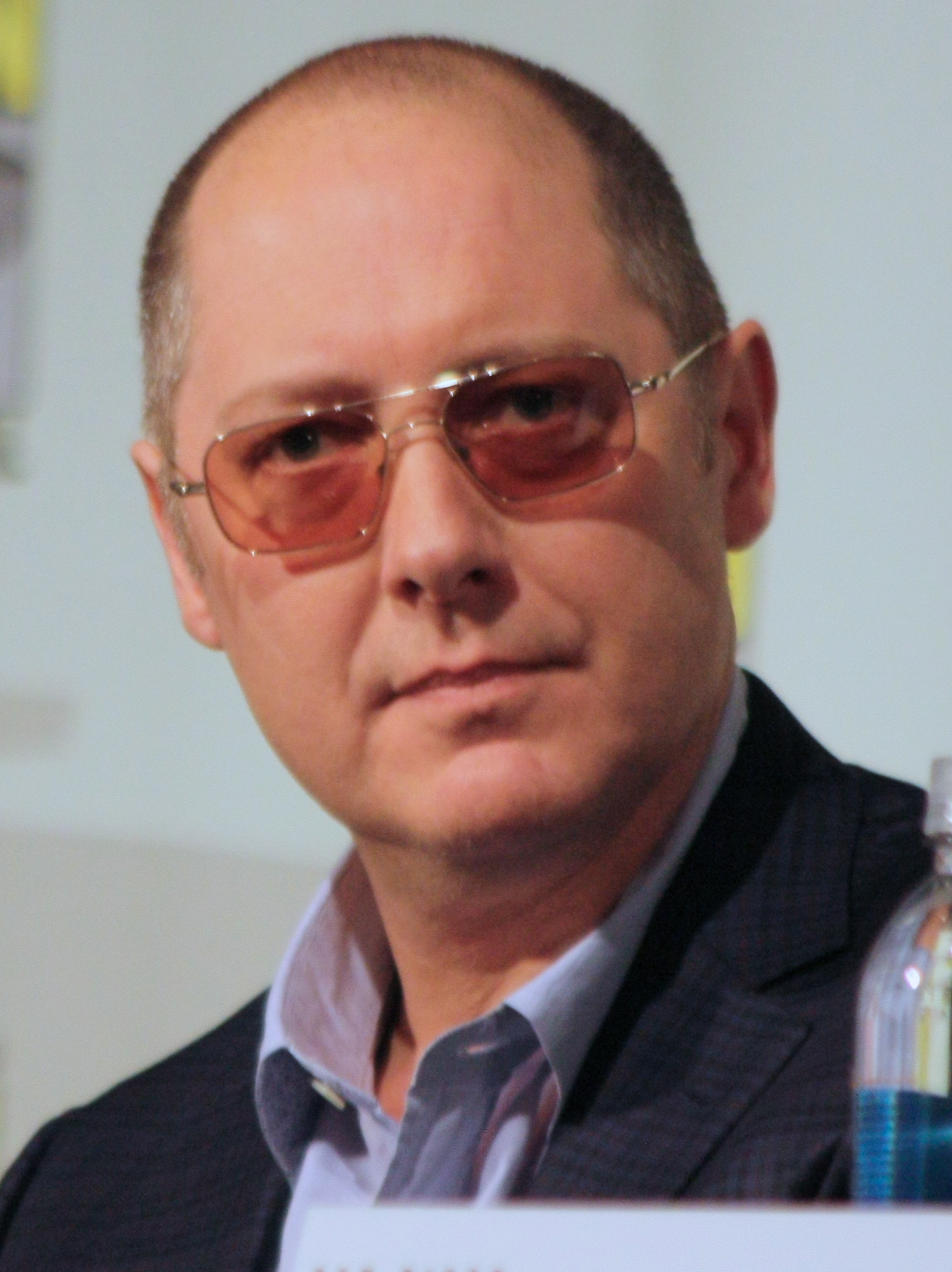
James Spader, Outstanding Lead Actor in a Drama Series winner

Sally Field, Outstanding Lead Actress in a Drama Series winner

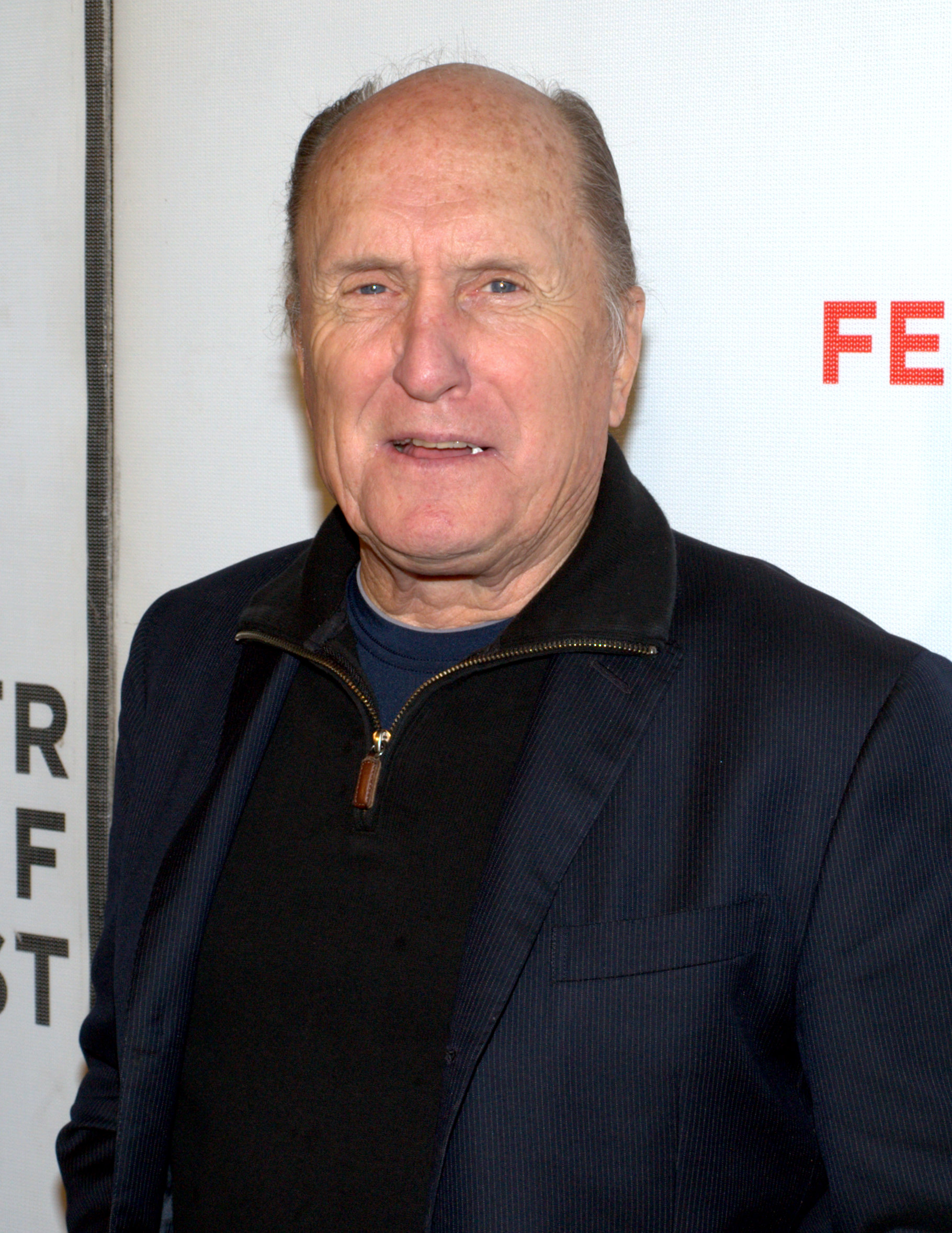
Robert Duvall, Outstanding Lead Actor in a Miniseries or Movie winner

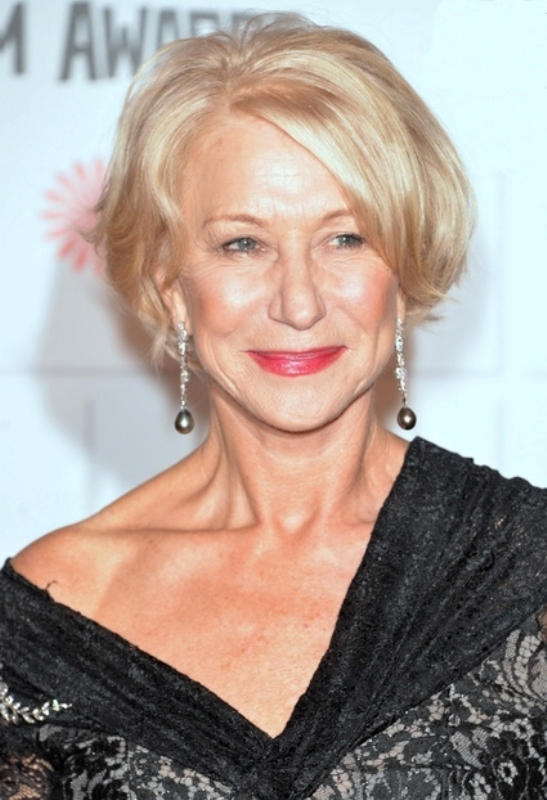
Helen Mirren, Outstanding Lead Actress in a Miniseries or Movie winner

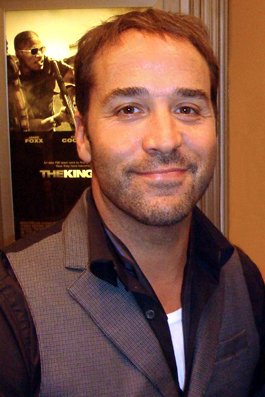
Jeremy Piven, Outstanding Supporting Actor in a Comedy Series winner

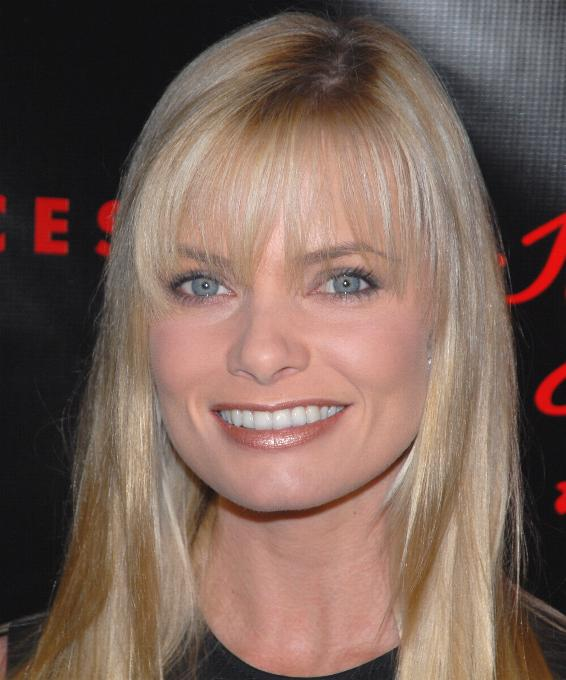
Jaime Pressly, Outstanding Supporting Actress in a Comedy Series winner

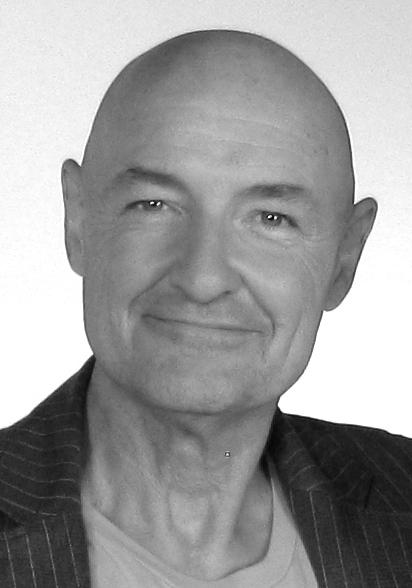
Terry O'Quinn, Outstanding Supporting Actor in a Drama Series winner

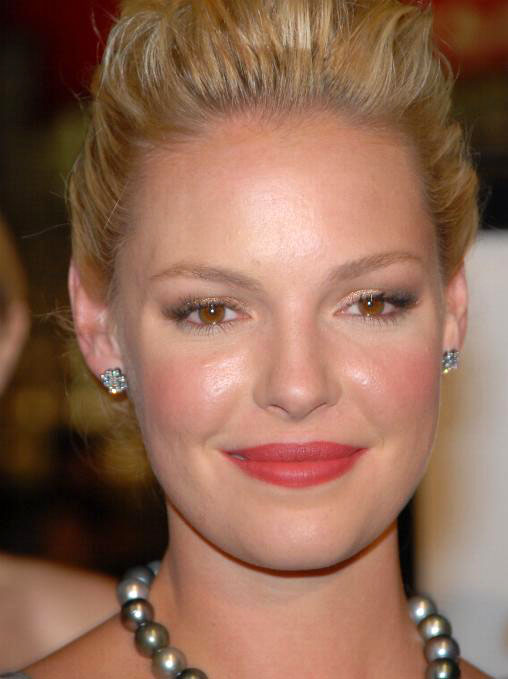
Katherine Heigl, Outstanding Supporting Actress in a Drama Series winner

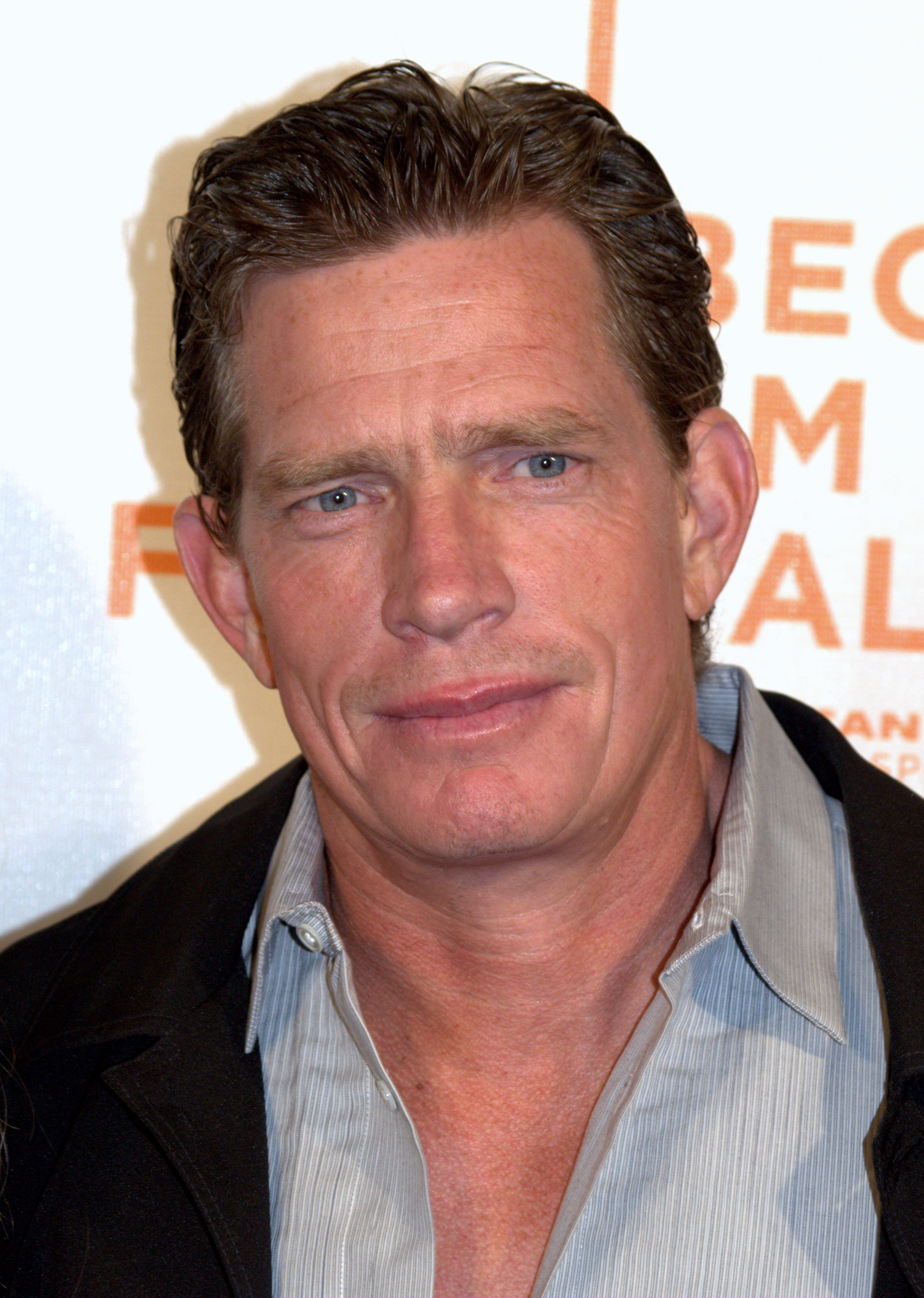
Thomas Haden Church, Outstanding Supporting Actor in a Miniseries or Movie winner

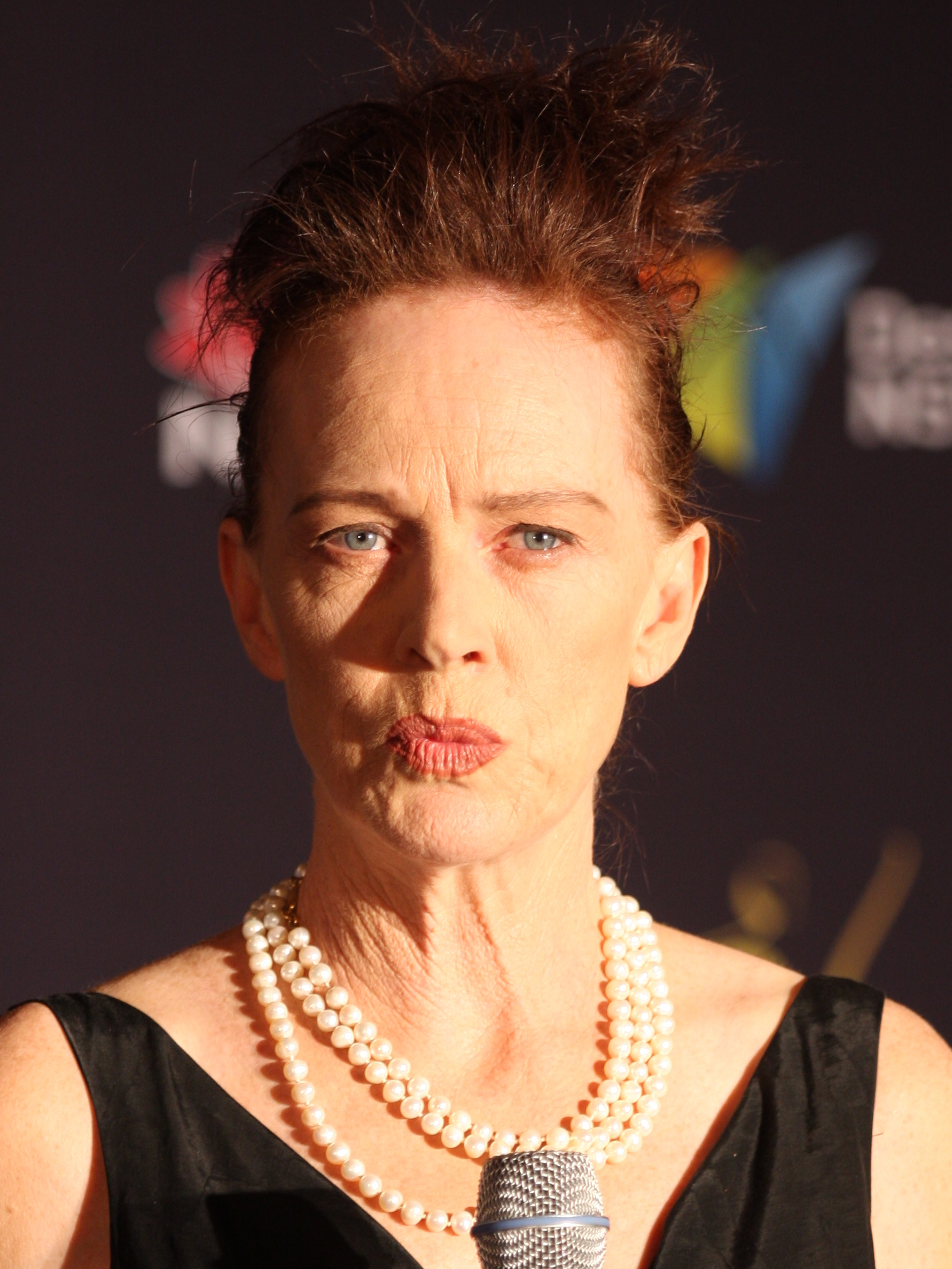
Judy Davis, Outstanding Supporting Actress in a Miniseries or Movie winner

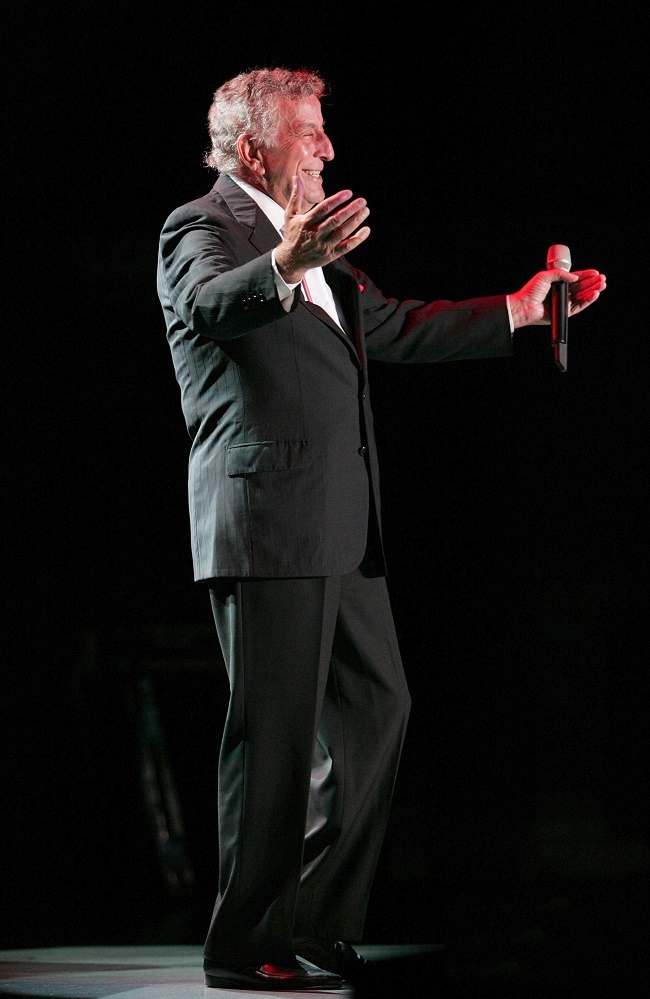
Tony Bennett, Outstanding Individual Performance in a Variety or Music Program winner

=== Programs ===
Programs
**Outstanding Comedy Series**: **30 Rock (NBC)**; Entourage (HBO); The Office (NBC); Two and a Half Men (CBS); Ugly Betty (ABC)	**Outstanding Drama Series**: **The Sopranos (HBO)**; Boston Legal (ABC); Grey's Anatomy (ABC); Heroes (NBC); House (Fox)
**Outstanding Variety, Music or Comedy Series**: **The Daily Show with Jon Stewart (Comedy Central)**; The Colbert Report (Comedy Central); Late Night with Conan O'Brien (NBC); Late Show with David Letterman (CBS); Real Time with Bill Maher (HBO)	**Outstanding Variety, Music or Comedy Special**: **Tony Bennett: An American Classic (NBC)**; Comedy Central Roast of William Shatner (Comedy Central); Great Performances (Episode: "Tribute to James Taylor") (PBS); The Kennedy Center Honors (CBS); Lewis Black: Red, White, and Screwed (HBO); Wanda Sykes: Sick and Tired (HBO)
**Outstanding Made for Television Movie**: **Bury My Heart at Wounded Knee (HBO)**; 9/11: The Twin Towers (Discovery Channel); Longford (HBO); The Ron Clark Story (TNT); Why I Wore Lipstick to My Mastectomy (Lifetime)	**Outstanding Miniseries**: **Broken Trail (AMC)**; Prime Suspect: The Final Act (PBS); The Starter Wife (USA)
**Outstanding Reality-Competition Program**: **The Amazing Race (CBS)**; American Idol (Fox); Dancing with the Stars (ABC); Project Runway (Bravo); Top Chef (Bravo)

=== Acting ===
==== Lead performances ====
Lead performances
**Outstanding Lead Actor in a Comedy Series**: **Ricky Gervais – Extras as Andy Milman (HBO)**; Alec Baldwin – 30 Rock as Jack Donaghy (NBC); Steve Carell – The Office as Michael Scott (NBC); Tony Shalhoub – Monk as Adrian Monk (USA); Charlie Sheen – Two and a Half Men as Charlie Harper (CBS)	**Outstanding Lead Actress in a Comedy Series**: **America Ferrera – Ugly Betty as Betty Suarez (ABC)**; Tina Fey – 30 Rock as Liz Lemon (NBC); Felicity Huffman – Desperate Housewives as Lynette Scavo (ABC) (Episode:[[“Bang”]]); Julia Louis-Dreyfus – The New Adventures of Old Christine as Christine Campbell (CBS); Mary-Louise Parker – Weeds as Nancy Botwin (Showtime)
**Outstanding Lead Actor in a Drama Series**: **James Spader – Boston Legal as Alan Shore (ABC)**; James Gandolfini – The Sopranos as Tony Soprano (HBO); Hugh Laurie – House as Gregory House (Fox); Denis Leary – Rescue Me as Tommy Gavin (FX); Kiefer Sutherland – 24 as Jack Bauer (Fox)	**Outstanding Lead Actress in a Drama Series**: **Sally Field – Brothers & Sisters as Nora Walker (ABC)**; Patricia Arquette – Medium as Allison DuBois (NBC); Minnie Driver – The Riches as Dahlia Malloy (FX); Edie Falco – The Sopranos as Carmela Soprano (HBO); Mariska Hargitay – Law & Order: Special Victims Unit as Olivia Benson (NBC); Kyra Sedgwick – The Closer as Brenda Leigh Johnson (TNT)
**Outstanding Lead Actor in a Miniseries or Movie**: **Robert Duvall – Broken Trail as Prentice "Print" Ritter (AMC)**; Jim Broadbent – Longford as Lord Longford (HBO); William H. Macy – Nightmares & Dreamscapes: From the Stories of Stephen King as Clyde Umney / Sam Landry (TNT); Matthew Perry – The Ron Clark Story as Ron Clark (TNT); Tom Selleck – Jesse Stone: Sea Change as Jesse Stone (CBS)	**Outstanding Lead Actress in a Miniseries or Movie**: **Helen Mirren – Prime Suspect: The Final Act as DCI Jane Tennison (PBS)**; Queen Latifah – Life Support as Ana Wallace (HBO); Debra Messing – The Starter Wife as Molly Kagan (USA); Mary-Louise Parker – The Robber Bride as Zenia Arden (Oxygen); Gena Rowlands – What If God Were the Sun? as Melissa Eisenbloom (Lifetime)

==== Supporting performances ====
Supporting performances
**Outstanding Supporting Actor in a Comedy Series**: **Jeremy Piven – Entourage as Ari Gold (HBO)**; Jon Cryer – Two and a Half Men as Dr. Alan Harper (CBS); Kevin Dillon – Entourage as Johnny "Drama" Chase (HBO); Neil Patrick Harris – How I Met Your Mother as Barney Stinson (CBS); Rainn Wilson – The Office as Dwight Schrute (NBC)	**Outstanding Supporting Actress in a Comedy Series**: **Jaime Pressly – My Name Is Earl as Joy Turner (NBC) (Episode: “Jump For Joy”)**; Conchata Ferrell – Two and a Half Men as Berta (CBS); Jenna Fischer – The Office as Pam Beesly (NBC); Elizabeth Perkins – Weeds as Celia Hodes (Showtime); Holland Taylor – Two and a Half Men as Evelyn Harper (CBS); Vanessa Williams – Ugly Betty as Wilhelmina Slater (ABC)
**Outstanding Supporting Actor in a Drama Series**: **Terry O'Quinn – Lost as John Locke (ABC)**; Michael Emerson – Lost as Ben Linus (ABC); Michael Imperioli – The Sopranos as Christopher Moltisanti (HBO); T. R. Knight – Grey's Anatomy as Dr. George O'Malley (ABC); Masi Oka – Heroes as Hiro Nakamura (NBC); William Shatner – Boston Legal as Denny Crane (ABC)	**Outstanding Supporting Actress in a Drama Series**: **Katherine Heigl – Grey's Anatomy as Dr. Isobel "Izzie" Stevens (ABC)**; Lorraine Bracco – The Sopranos as Dr. Jennifer Melfi (HBO); Rachel Griffiths – Brothers & Sisters as Sarah Whedon (ABC); Sandra Oh – Grey's Anatomy as Dr. Cristina Yang (ABC); Aida Turturro – The Sopranos as Janice Soprano (HBO); Chandra Wilson – Grey's Anatomy as Dr. Miranda Bailey (ABC)
**Outstanding Supporting Actor in a Miniseries or Movie**: **Thomas Haden Church – Broken Trail as Tom Harte (AMC)**; Edward Asner – The Christmas Card as Luke Spelman (Hallmark Channel); Joe Mantegna – The Starter Wife as Lou Manahan (USA); Aidan Quinn – Bury My Heart at Wounded Knee as Henry L. Dawes (HBO); August Schellenberg – Bury My Heart at Wounded Knee as Sitting Bull (HBO)	**Outstanding Supporting Actress in a Miniseries or Movie**: **Judy Davis – The Starter Wife as Joan McAllister (USA)**; Toni Collette – Tsunami: The Aftermath as Kathy Graham (HBO); Samantha Morton – Longford as Myra Hindley (HBO); Anna Paquin – Bury My Heart at Wounded Knee as Elaine Goodale (HBO); Greta Scacchi – Broken Trail as Nola Johns (AMC)

==== Individual performances ====
Individual performances
**Outstanding Individual Performance in a Variety or Music Program**
- **Tony Bennett – Tony Bennett: An American Classic (NBC)**
  - Stephen Colbert –The Colbert Report (Comedy Central)
  - Ellen DeGeneres – The 79th Annual Academy Awards (ABC)
  - David Letterman – Late Show with David Letterman (CBS)
  - Jon Stewart – The Daily Show with Jon Stewart (Comedy Central)

=== Directing ===
Directing
**Outstanding Directing for a Comedy Series**: **Ugly Betty: "Pilot" – Richard Shepard (ABC)**; 30 Rock: "The Break-Up" – Scott Ellis (NBC); Entourage: "One Day in the Valley" – Julian Farino (HBO); Extras: "Orlando Bloom" – Ricky Gervais and Stephen Merchant (HBO); The Office: "Gay Witch Hunt" – Ken Kwapis (NBC); Scrubs: "My Musical" – Will Mackenzie (NBC)	**Outstanding Directing for a Drama Series**: **The Sopranos: "Kennedy and Heidi" – Alan Taylor (HBO)**; Battlestar Galactica: "Exodus, Part 2" – Félix Enríquez Alcalá (Sci Fi); Boston Legal: "Son of the Defender" – Bill D'Elia (ABC); Friday Night Lights: "Pilot" – Peter Berg (NBC); Heroes: "Genesis" – David Semel (NBC); Lost: "Through the Looking Glass" – Jack Bender (ABC); Studio 60 on the Sunset Strip: "Pilot" – Thomas Schlamme (NBC)
**Outstanding Directing for a Variety, Music or Comedy Program**: **Tony Bennett: An American Classic – Rob Marshall (NBC)**; American Idol – Bruce Gowers (Fox); The Colbert Report – Jim Hoskinson (Comedy Central); The Daily Show with Jon Stewart – Chuck O'Neil (Comedy Central); Saturday Night Live – Don Roy King (NBC)	**Outstanding Directing for a Miniseries, Movie or Dramatic Special**: **Prime Suspect: The Final Act – Philip Martin (PBS)**; Broken Trail – Walter Hill (AMC); Bury My Heart at Wounded Knee – Yves Simoneau (HBO); Jane Eyre – Susanna White (PBS); Tsunami: The Aftermath – Bharat Nalluri (HBO)

=== Writing ===
Writing
**Outstanding Writing for a Comedy Series**: **The Office: "Gay Witch Hunt" – Greg Daniels (NBC)**; 30 Rock: "Jack-Tor" – Robert Carlock (NBC); 30 Rock: "Tracy Does Conan" – Tina Fey (NBC); Extras: "Daniel Radcliffe" – Ricky Gervais and Stephen Merchant (HBO); The Office: "The Negotiation" – Michael Schur (NBC)	**Outstanding Writing for a Drama Series**: **The Sopranos: "Made in America" – David Chase (HBO)**; Battlestar Galactica: "Occupation" / "Precipice" – Ronald D. Moore (Sci Fi); Lost: "Through the Looking Glass" – Carlton Cuse and Damon Lindelof (ABC); The Sopranos: "Kennedy and Heidi" – David Chase and Matthew Weiner (HBO); The Sopranos: "The Second Coming" – Terence Winter (HBO)
**Outstanding Writing for a Variety, Music or Comedy Program**: **Late Night with Conan O'Brien (NBC)**; The Colbert Report (Comedy Central); The Daily Show with Jon Stewart (Comedy Central); Late Show with David Letterman (CBS); Real Time with Bill Maher (HBO)	**Outstanding Writing for a Miniseries, Movie or Dramatic Special**: **Prime Suspect: The Final Act – Frank Deasy (PBS)**; Broken Trail – Alan Geoffrion (AMC); Bury My Heart at Wounded Knee – Daniel Giat (HBO); The Starter Wife – Josann McGibbon and Sara Parriott (USA); Jane Eyre – Sandy Welch (PBS)

== Most major nominations ==
Networks with multiple major nominations (Note: "Major" constitutes the categories listed above: Program, Acting, Directing, and Writing. Does not include the technical categories.)
Network	No. of Nominations
HBO	33
NBC	28
ABC	21
CBS	11

Programs with multiple major nominations
Program	Category	Network	No. of Nominations
The Sopranos	Drama	HBO	10
The Office	Comedy	NBC	7
30 Rock	Comedy	NBC	6
Broken Trail	Miniseries	AMC	6
Bury My Heart at Wounded Knee	Movie	HBO	6
Grey's Anatomy	Drama	ABC	5
The Starter Wife	Miniseries	USA	5
Two and a Half Men	Comedy	CBS	5
Boston Legal	Drama	ABC	4
The Colbert Report	Variety	Comedy Central	4
The Daily Show with Jon Stewart	Variety	Comedy Central	4
Entourage	Comedy	HBO	4
Lost	Drama	ABC	4
Prime Suspect: The Final Act	Miniseries	PBS	4
Ugly Betty	Comedy	ABC	4
Extras	Comedy	HBO	3
Heroes	Drama	NBC	3
Late Show with David Letterman	Variety	CBS	3
Longford	Movie	HBO	3
Tony Bennett: An American Classic	Variety	NBC	3
American Idol	Competition	Fox	2
Battlestar Galactica	Drama	Sci Fi	2
Brothers & Sisters	Drama	ABC	2
House	Drama	Fox	2
Jane Eyre	Miniseries	PBS	2
Late Night with Conan O'Brien	Variety	NBC	2
Real Time with Bill Maher	Variety	HBO	2
The Ron Clark Story	Movie	TNT	2
Tsunami: The Aftermath	Miniseries	HBO	2
Weeds	Comedy	Showtime	2

== Most major awards ==
Networks with multiple major awards
Network	No. of Awards
NBC	7
ABC	6
HBO	6
AMC	3
PBS	3

Programs with multiple major awards
Program	Category	Network	No. of Awards
Broken Trail	Miniseries	AMC	3
Prime Suspect: The Final Act	Miniseries	PBS	3
The Sopranos	Drama	HBO	3
Tony Bennett: An American Classic	Variety	NBC	3
Ugly Betty	Comedy	ABC	2

== Presenters ==
The awards were presented by the following:

Name(s)	Role
Ray Romano	Presenter of the award for Outstanding Supporting Actor in a Comedy Series
America Ferrera; Vanessa Williams	Presenters of the award for Outstanding Supporting Actor in a Drama Series
Tina Fey; Julia Louis-Dreyfus	Presenters of the award for Outstanding Supporting Actress in a Comedy Series
Kyle Chandler; Katherine Heigl	Presenters of the award for Outstanding Supporting Actor in a Miniseries or Movie
Kevin Connelly; Kevin Dillon; Jerry Ferrara; Adrien Grenier; Eva Longoria; Jeremy Piven	Presenters of the award for Outstanding Supporting Actress in a Drama Series
Jon Cryer; Jennifer Love Hewitt	Presenters of the award for Outstanding Writing for a Variety, Music or Comedy Program
Alec Baldwin	Presenter of the award for Outstanding Directing for a Variety, Music or Comedy Program
Ali Larter; Kiefer Sutherland	Presenters of the award for Outstanding Lead Actor in a Miniseries or Movie
Queen Latifah	Presenter for a special presentation celebrating the 30th anniversary of Roots
John Amos; Ed Asner; LeVar Burton; Lou Gossett Jr. Cicely Tyson; Leslie Uggams; Ben Vereen	Presenters of the award for Outstanding Miniseries
Neil Patrick Harris; Hayden Panettiere	Introducers of Outstanding Guest Actress in a Drama Series winner Leslie Caron
Leslie Caron	Presenter of the award for Outstanding Directing for a Drama Series
Neil Patrick Harris; Hayden Panettiere	Presenters of the award for Outstanding Writing for a Drama Series
Steve Carell	Presenter of the awards for Outstanding Variety, Music or Comedy Series and Outstanding Variety, Music or Comedy Special
Marcia Cross; Mark Harmon	Presenters of the award for Outstanding Supporting Actress in a Miniseries or Movie
Dick Askin	Presenter of a special presentation dedicated to the Television Academy's charitable causes
Glenn Close; Mary-Louise Parker; Kyra Sedgwick	Presenters of the award for Outstanding Television Movie
Joe Mantegna	Presenter of a special presentation to The Sopranos
Patrick Dempsey; Sally Field	Presenters of the award for Outstanding Lead Actress in a Miniseries or Movie
Kathryn Morris; Danny Pino	Presenters of the awards for Outstanding Directing for a Miniseries, Movie or Dramatic Special and Outstanding Writing for a Miniseries, Movie or Dramatic Special
Tom Anderson; Masi Oka	Presenters of the award for Outstanding Creative Achievement in Interactive Television
Joely Fisher; Brad Garrett	Presenters of the award for Outstanding Individual Performance in a Variety or Music Program
Anthony Anderson; Teri Hatcher	Introducers of Outstanding Guest Actor in a Comedy Series winner Stanley Tucci; Outstanding Guest Actress in a Comedy Series winner Elaine Stritch
Elaine Stritch; Stanley Tucci	Presenters of the award for Outstanding Directing for a Comedy Series
Anthony Anderson; Teri Hatcher	Presenters of the award for Outstanding Writing for a Comedy Series
Wayne Brady	Introducer of "Don't Forget the Lyrics!" mock-contest
Kanye West; Rainn Wilson	Presenters of the award for Outstanding Reality-Competition Program
Stephen Colbert; Jon Stewart	Presenters of the award for Outstanding Lead Actor in a Comedy Series
Felicity Huffman; Hugh Laurie	Presenters of the award for Outstanding Lead Actress in a Drama Series
Debra Messing; William Shatner	Presenters of the award for Outstanding Lead Actress in a Comedy Series
Jimmy Smits; Kate Walsh	Presenters of the award for Outstanding Lead Actor in a Drama Series
Kelsey Grammer; Patricia Heaton	Presenters of the award for Outstanding Comedy Series
Helen Mirren	Presenter of the award for Outstanding Drama Series

== Interactive TV ==
Al Gore's Current TV was presented with the Interactive TV Emmy by Masi Oka of Heroes with the help of MySpace's president Tom Anderson. This was the first year the Emmy was presented during the Primetime awards ceremony.

== In Memoriam ==
- Jane Wyatt
- Tige Andrews
- Joseph Barbera
- Roscoe Lee Browne
- Edward Albert Jr.
- Yvonne De Carlo
- Mike Evans
- Sidney Sheldon
- Calvert DeForest
- Glenn Ford
- Arthur Hill
- Bob Carroll Jr.
- Beverly Sills
- Ed Friendly
- Mel Shavelson
- James Glennon
- Don Herbert
- Stan Daniels
- Barbara McNair
- Stuart Rosenberg
- Tommy Newsom
- Steve Irwin
- Joel Siegel
- Peter Boyle
- Charles Nelson Reilly
- Jack Palance
- Jane Wyman
- Tom Poston
- Tom Snyder
- Ed Bradley
- Luciano Pavarotti
- Merv Griffin

== Memorable moments ==
The stage was designed with seating surrounding the platform creating a theatre in the round, with a catwalk-style walkway for winners and presenters to exit the stage. A trapdoor was placed in the center of the main stage; some TV critics viewed this as a reference to Fox's American Idol. During his acceptance speech, James Spader made a comment about the seating design, saying "I've been to thousands and thousands of concerts in my life and I can tell you these are the worst seats I've ever had".

=== Opening number ===
For the opening, Brian and Stewie Griffin, characters from Fox's animated series Family Guy (both voiced by Seth MacFarlane), sang the song "You Can Find It on TV". The song, a rewrite of "The FCC Song" from the show's Emmy-nominated episode "PTV", recapped memorable moments of the past television season while noting the variety of programming that will come to the future.

=== The Don't Forget the Lyrics mock-contest ===
Another segment occurred during the presentation of the Outstanding Reality-Competition Program award. There was a competition between singer Kanye West (who attended the ceremony in retaliation for his loss at MTV's Video Music Awards earlier that month) and The Office actor Rainn Wilson similar to Don't Forget the Lyrics! (which, like the 2007 Emmys, airs on Fox) with host Wayne Brady presiding. West sang the last line of the chorus in the song "Stronger" as "That how long I've been on you" which was supposed to be "That how long I've been on ya", losing to Wilson. West jokingly retorted "I never win", poking fun at his losses at award ceremonies and presented the award alongside Wilson.

=== Steppin' Out With My Baby ===
Tony Bennett and Christina Aguilera sang "Steppin' Out With My Baby" from Bennett's award-winning special.

=== Award for Outstanding Lead Actor in a Comedy Series ===
Jon Stewart and Stephen Colbert presented the award for Outstanding Lead Actor in a Comedy Series. The award went to Ricky Gervais for Extras, but after reading his name, Jon Stewart was informed that Gervais was not at the ceremony. Stewart immediately announced, "Ricky Gervais couldn't be here tonight, so instead we're going to give this to our friend Steve Carell" (who had been nominated for his role on The Office). Carell ran onto the stage and hugged Stewart and Colbert as they all screamed in mock celebration, then ran off together with the award. As a joke, in 2008, at the 60th Primetime Emmy Awards, Ricky Gervais showed a video of the moment, commenting, "Look at [Carell's] stupid face," accusing Carell of "stealing" his award, and demanding it back. He approached Carell, who was sitting straight-faced in the front row, and repeated, "Give me my Emmy," over and over, even going so far as to tickle Carell, until Carell produced the statue from under his seat.

=== Censorship controversy ===
The LED display ball that Fox cut away to during moments of "vulgarity".

During the Fox telecast, some presenters and award winners were censored while making statements. When Ray Romano delivered a comic monologue about the change of television in the years since he left his own show, he mentioned that "for one, from what I hear, Frasier is screwing my wife?". On Fox, all that was heard was "for one, from what I hear, Frasier is" before Fox cut the audio and replaced the feed with pre-recorded material of an LED display ball with text scrolling around it. When viewers saw the ball through a high camera angle, it is revealed that the ball covered the entire stage. This lasted approximately 10 seconds before Fox returned to Romano. The reason for the censorship of this comment has been debated between vulgar language or revealing an important plot line to the show.

When Katherine Heigl accepted her award for Outstanding Supporting Actress in a Drama Series, she accidentally used profanity in her speech, causing Fox to cut the audio and once again replaced its feed with the pre-recorded shot of the display ball, only to return a moment later.

The biggest censorship controversy was when actress Sally Field accepted her Emmy for Outstanding Lead Actress in a Drama Series. After giving an acceptance speech which included anti-war statements, partially as a tribute to her Brothers & Sisters character Nora Walker, the audience applauded before she was finished and Field, finding herself lost for words, couldn't remember what she was going to say. When she regained her words, she concluded her speech with "If mothers ruled the world, there would be no goddamn wars in the first place." Fox had cut to the display ball as she began to say "goddamn". This remark, and Fox's censorship of the remark, caused controversy in the days following the ceremony, leading critics to wonder if Fox had censored "Goddamn" or "Goddamn wars". Field's remarks caused Fox to implement a four-second delay for the remainder of the telecast. All of these comments were left uncensored on CTV in Canada, and other international simulcasts.

Also, at the Creative Arts Awards ceremony eight days earlier, Kathy Griffin, who won for Kathy Griffin: My Life on the D-List caused controversy in her acceptance speech after she denounced celebrities who thank Jesus for their awards. She later concluded her speech with an off-color joke that included "Suck it, Jesus! This award is my God now!" The Catholic League condemned her comments and successfully convinced E! to censor her speech during the telecast the following Saturday.
