= Kennedy and Heidi =

- The Sopranos episode
- Episode no.: Season 6 Episode 18
- Directed by: Alan Taylor
- Written by: Matthew Weiner; David Chase
- Cinematography by: Alik Sakharov
- Editing by: William B. Stich
- Production code: S618
- Original air date: May 13, 2007
- Running time: 52 minutes

Episode chronology
← Previous "Walk Like a Man"	Next → "The Second Coming"
- The Sopranos season 6

"Kennedy and Heidi" is the 83rd episode of the American crime drama The Sopranos, the sixth episode of the second half of the show's sixth season, and the 18th episode of the season overall. Written by Matthew Weiner and series creator and showrunner David Chase and directed by Alan Taylor, it debuted on May 13, 2007, on HBO in the U.S. The episode focuses on the aftermath of a car crash involving Tony Soprano and Christopher Moltisanti, while Tony's son A.J. adjusts to life with antidepressants.

With nearly 6.5 million viewers, "Kennedy and Heidi" was the sixth straight Sopranos episode to lead the Nielsen weekly cable ratings. Critical reception was positive, with the character traits of Tony and A.J. attracting analysis. Taylor won the Primetime Emmy Award for Outstanding Directing for a Drama Series in 2007 for directing "Kennedy and Heidi".

== Starring ==
- James Gandolfini as Tony Soprano
- Lorraine Bracco as Dr. Jennifer Melfi
- Edie Falco as Carmela Soprano
- Michael Imperioli as Christopher Moltisanti
- Dominic Chianese as Corrado Soprano, Jr. *
- Steven Van Zandt as Silvio Dante
- Tony Sirico as Paulie Gualtieri
- Robert Iler as Anthony Soprano, Jr.
- Jamie-Lynn Sigler as Meadow Soprano
- Aida Turturro as Janice Soprano Baccalieri
- Steven R. Schirripa as Bobby Baccalieri
- Frank Vincent as Phil Leotardo
- John Ventimiglia as Artie Bucco
- Ray Abruzzo as Little Carmine Lupertazzi
- Dan Grimaldi as Patsy Parisi
- Sharon Angela as Rosalie Aprile
- Kathrine Narducci as Charmaine Bucco

* = credit only

=== Guest starring ===
- Julianna Margulies as Julianna Skiff
- Sarah Shahi as Sonya Aragon
- Daniel Baldwin as himself
- Gregory Antonacci as Butch DeConcini
- Max Casella as Benny Fazio
- Cara Buono as Kelli Lombardo Moltisanti
- Michael Countryman as Dr. Richard Vogel
- Michael Drayer as Jason Parisi
- Frances Ensemplare as Nucci Gualtieri
- Frank John Hughes as Walden Belfiore
- Marianne Leone as Joanne Moltisanti
- Arthur Nascarella as Carlo Gervasi
- Dennis Paladino as Al Lombardo
- Joseph Perrino as Jason Gervasi
- Bambadjan Bamba as Cyclist
- Al Roffe as Operations Manager
- Phyllis Kay as Rita Lombardo
- Mark La Mura as Alan Kaplan
- Joey Perillo as John Stefano
- Elizabeth Dennis as Andrea
- Chris Bashinelli as Kevin
- Lindsay Campbell as Professor Kline
- Christiana Anbri as Heidi
- Leah Bezozo as Kennedy
- Gregory Zaragoza as Croupier
- William DeMeo as Jason Molinaro
- Artie Pasquale as Burt Gervasi
- John Wu as Morgan Yam
- Matt Sauerhoff as Victor Mineo
- Edward Furs as Driver
- Alexander Flores as Kid
- Ray DeMattis as Gerry Gaultieri
- Maureen Van Zandt as Gabriella Dante
- Denise Borino-Quinn as Ginny Sacrimoni
- Elizabeth Bracco as Marie Spatafore
- Danielle Di Vecchio as Barbara Soprano Giglione
- Anthony J. Ribustello as Dante Greco
- John Cenatiempo as Anthony Maffei
- John "Cha Cha" Ciarcia as Albie Cianflone
- Jonathan LaPaglia as himself
- Vinnie Orofino as Bryan Spatafore
- Ed Vassallo as Tom Giglione
- Joe Pucillo as Beppy Scerbo
- Michelle Maryk as Jo Lewis
- Dina Pearlman as Ellen Reinstein
- Mickey Pizzo as Sal Pisano
- Sejal Shah as Chandrakanta Pisano
- Zuzanna Szadkowski as Elżbieta
- Marc Wolf as Mark Lewis

== Synopsis ==
Phil discovers that the construction/demolition waste that Tony has been sending to Barone Sanitation contains asbestos. At a meeting in New York, he says that he will not accept any more unless he receives a 25% cut; Tony refuses his offer. As Christopher drives him back to Newark, Tony admits he may have to yield, but the waste is eventually dumped into a lake.

Chris is restless as he drives, and Tony looks at him carefully, realizing Chris has relapsed. Their car drifts into the opposite lane then swerves sharply to avoid an approaching car. They go off the road, and the car rolls many times as it descends an embankment. Tony exits the wreckage in pain but with only minor injuries. Chris, who was not wearing a seat belt, is seriously injured, with internal bleeding. He manages to tell Tony to call a taxi, as he would not pass a drug test. Tony begins to call 911 for help but, after glancing at the mangled child seat in the rear of the car, he changes his mind. He pinches Chris's nose shut so that he cannot breathe, and Chris chokes to death on his own blood.

Tony dreams that he tells Dr. Melfi that he killed Chris, Pussy, and Tony B. During his actual session, he recalls Chris as a liability and an embarrassment and says he resents having to feign remorse in front of his family. At the wake, he is disgusted by the display of sorrows. He and Carmela also go to the wake of Paulie's adoptive mother Nucci, who has died of a stroke. Paulie is angered by the poor attendance but appreciates Tony and Carmela's presence.

A.J.'s therapist sees that the prescribed drugs are working: he is happier and calmer and taking college courses again. He continues to spend time with Jason Parisi and Jason Gervasi at their frat house. They laugh about Victor, whose toes were amputated after they injured him with sulfuric acid. The two Jasons and others assault a Somali student while A.J. pushes him and damages his bike. A.J. then relapses into depression. "Why can't we all just get along?" he says to his therapist.

Tony decides to get away to Las Vegas. He meets Sonya, a stripper who was Chris's mistress. They have sex, smoke marijuana, and take peyote. Playing roulette, he has a winning streak. He mumbles, "He's dead," and collapses on the casino floor laughing. With Sonya, he watches the sun rise over the Red Rock Canyon. There is a flash in the sky, and Tony cries: "I get it!"

== Deceased ==
- Christopher Moltisanti: seriously injured in a car crash and then murdered by suffocation by Tony, who squeezes his nose shut when he is gasping for air; Tony subsequently claims he dies choking on his own blood.
- Marianucci Gualtieri: dies of a stroke

== Final appearances ==
- Ginny Sacrimoni: Johnny Sack's widow

== Production ==
- The truck in which Christopher and Tony crash on the side of the road was initially shown to be a newer model Cadillac Escalade EXT, but is revealed to be the previous model year truck, when shown after the crash.

== Music ==
- The first song heard in the car is "Cat's Squirrel" from the album Fresh Cream by Cream. The song that Christopher puts on the car stereo and on full volume as he is driving Tony right before the crash is Pink Floyd's "Comfortably Numb", performed by Roger Waters featuring Van Morrison & The Band, the first track from the soundtrack of The Departed.
- The song playing when Tony is first being driven in a taxi in Las Vegas is "Are You Alright?" by Lucinda Williams.
- The song playing in the background when Tony first meets Sonya is "Outta My Head" by M. Ward.
- The song playing in the background as Tony and Sonya are having sex is "The Adultress" by Pretenders.
- The song playing in the background when Tony and Sonya are talking in bed is "Space Invader" by Pretenders, which was also featured in the season 2 episode "House Arrest."
- The song played over the end credits is "Minas de Cobre (for Better Metal)" by Calexico.

== Reception ==
=== Critical reception ===
On its premiere, "Kennedy and Heidi" had 6.49 million viewers and led the Nielsen cable TV ratings for the sixth straight week.

Television Without Pity graded the episode with an A, with Kim Reed finding A.J.'s interest in politics and literature to be unusual for his character. Similarly, Dan Iverson of IGN found A.J. to be "more interesting than he has ever been before", in a review grading the episode 8.7 points out of 10.

The scene of Tony killing Christopher after the car crash attracted much criticism of Tony. Lisa Schwarzbaum, reviewing the episode for Entertainment Weekly, found Tony to be "a practical, emotionally shuttered monster", in contrast to previous scenes showing him as a "tender lug" who enjoyed small talk. Iverson of IGN also criticized Tony's conduct around the car crash as "egocentric" and added: "...Tony's character has been turned back into the villain which we often forget that he is." Paul Brownfield of the Los Angeles Times called Tony "despicable and lost, beyond empathy." Noticing how "Comfortably Numb" played on the car ride before the crash, Alan Sepinwall of The Star-Ledger suggested that should have been the episode title because it described Tony's attitude.

For TV Squad, Tom Biro rated the episode seven points out of seven, believing the death of Christopher to foreshadow a compelling series finale.

Matt Zoller Seitz found the choice to name the episode after two minor characters in a cutaway scene to symbolize "a moral test" that they failed.

=== Awards ===
- Director Alan Taylor won the Primetime Emmy Award for Outstanding Directing for a Drama Series at the 59th Primetime Emmy Awards.
