= BNO =

BNO may refer to:

- British National (Overseas), a class of British nationality
  - British National (Overseas) passport
- Baksan Neutrino Observatory, Caucasus mountains, Russia
- BNO News, a news agency
- Boys Night Out (band), an emo/post-hardcore band from Ontario, Canada.
- Burns Municipal Airport in Burns, Oregon, which have FAA identifier BNO
- The Beano, a British comic
- Building network operator, UK, concerned with electrical distribution in a building
- Bowels not open, i.e. constipation
