= MobLogic =

- MogLogic's host, Lindsay Campbell

Presentation
- Hosted by: Lindsay Campbell
- Genre: Video podcast
- Updates: Suspended

Publication
- Original release: March 29th, 2008 – December 12, 2008

MobLogic was a CBS news, politics, and pop culture show on the web. It was hosted at MobLogicTV Monday-Saturday. Typically, the show addressed something happening in the political or social sphere. The show employed the "man on the street" format, and the host, Lindsay Campbell, spent most of her time asking people what they thought about the events going on in the world.

== The show ==
Host Lindsay Campbell covered everything from newspaper articles to superdelegates. Episodes were shot in the show's New York studio, in Austin, and at the GOP and DNC conventions.

== The creators ==
Executive producers Adam Elend and Jeff Marks met fellow Executive Producer Lindsay Campbell when she auditioned for Elend and Marks' first foray into the web video world, Wallstrip. Campbell quickly became an important voice in the development of Wallstrip, which was bought out by CBS in May 2007.

All parties involved (CBS and the Wallstrip team) went into the deal with the idea of creating more short-form web video. MobLogic was their first new venture under the CBS umbrella.

== Press ==
Though some people were hesitant about an "independent" type web show coming out of the strait-laced CBS, most of the press and web community welcomed MobLogic.

From The Hollywood Reporter:

True. With "MobLogic," the second show from the guys behind the financial-minded video blog "Wallstrip" (acquired last year by CBS for $4 million), CBS Interactive has delivered a visually compelling news and entertainment show with nary a trace of overproduction. Delivered daily via a bounty of Web media (iTunes downloads, YouTube embeds, HD podcasts, etc.), "MobLogic's" m.o. is mostly mob logic, i.e., man-on-the-street interviews. Host Campbell, also nee "Wallstrip," chats up midtown passers-by about a single daily news topic. She invokes, they emote.

The result is amusing, jaywalking-like juxtapositions, sans the imposition of hypertrophied chin. Take the episode about global warming, in which Campbell wades through a February snowstorm prompting pedestrians with, "There's no global warming, Al Gore's full of shit."

To which the interviewees respond variously, "It's not a myth"; "I don't know"; "I don't know, I'm cold"; and "Maybe God's having a party in the sky."
