= Dumpling emoji =

Emoji representing the dumpling

The Dumpling emoji (U+1F95F 🥟 DUMPLING) is an emoji included in the Unicode 10.0 and Emoji 5.0 lists, depicting a dumpling. Designed by Yiying Lu, who jointly envisioned it with Jennifer 8. Lee, it was approved in January 2016 and officially released in March 2017.

== Development and usage history ==
In 2015, Lu was invited by Lee to have dumplings in San Francisco and realized that there was not a dumpling emoji on her smartphone. Afterward, she mocked up an emoji-style dumpling "with an anthropomorphic face and flashing heart-shaped eyes" and set out on the goal "to make a dumpling emoji available to everybody."

By November, Lee attended a meeting held by the Unicode Consortium in Silicon Valley after paying $75 for a membership. There, she learned more about the process of how an emoji is created; she also was later appointed to an emoji subcommittee in the consortium. Since becoming a voting member of the consortium required $7,500 per year at the time, Lee and Lu founded Emojination, a Kickstarter-funded organization advocating for more inclusive emojis which received support from people like Eddie Huang, Kenny Lao, and others, in addition to circulating a petition. The campaign ultimately raised around $11,000.

Lu and Lee pitched the dumpling emoji at another Unicode Consortium meeting in January 2016. Lu and the consortium then went through multiple revisions of the dumpling emoji, such as the removal of an anthropomorphic face, the angle of it, and other notes from the latter. In the end, she chose a design that "doesn't look precisely like any dumpling" but rather could resemble dumplings from various culinary traditions around the world. It was approved in mid-2016.

In March 2017, the Unicode Consortium unveiled Emoji 5.0, which included 56 new emojis, including the dumpling emoji.

Character information
Preview	🥟	
Unicode name	DUMPLING	
Encodings	decimal	hex
Unicode	129375	U+1F95F
UTF-8	240 159 165 159	F0 9F A5 9F
UTF-16	55358 56671	D83E DD5F
Numeric character reference	&#129375;	&#x1F95F;
