= Lindsay Campbell =

American actress

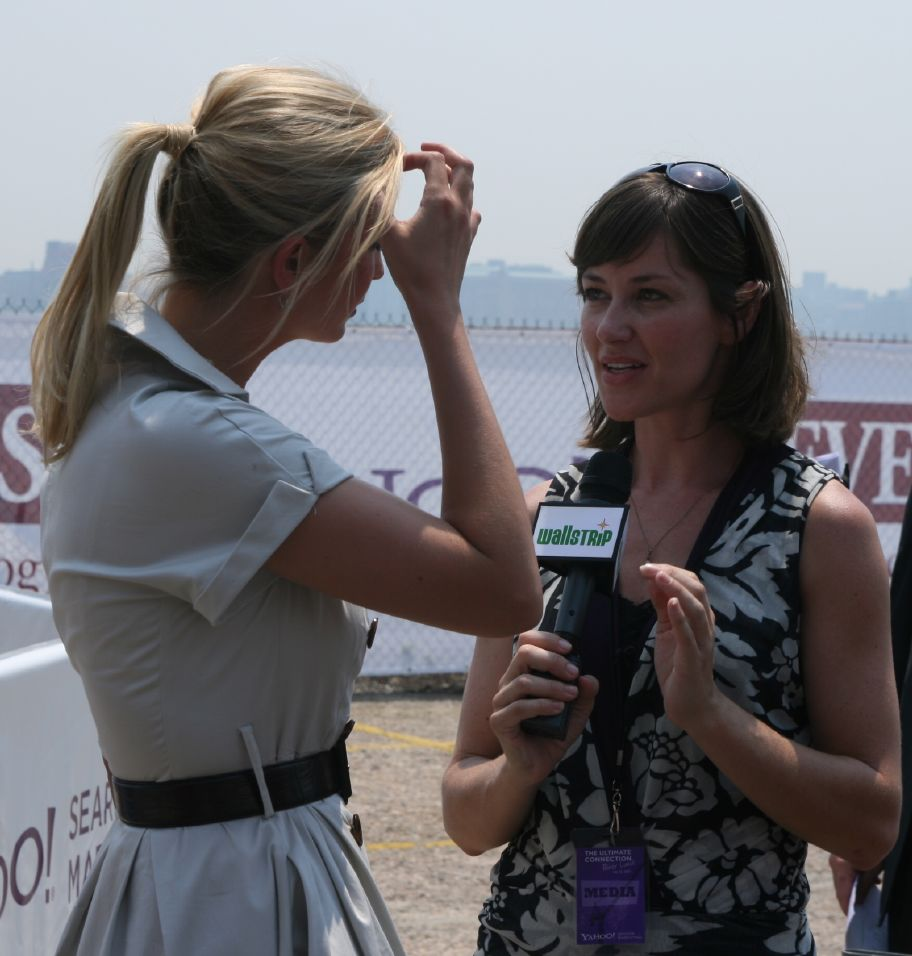
- Campbell interviews Ivanka Trump, 2007
- Born: c. 1977 (age 48–49); Northern California, U.S.
- Notable work: Wallstrip, MobLogic, AOL Daybreak
- Spouse: Aaron Nauta
- Website: http://about.me/lindsaycampbell

Lindsay Campbell is an American actress and web journalist. She is currently the Executive Producer of Originals at IMDb. Previously, she was the director of YouTube Nation, a daily show hosted by Jacob Soboroff that was a co-production of DreamWorks and YouTube. She was the host of a daily online show called Wallstrip which was produced in Manhattan. She left Wallstrip on January 14, 2008 to host MobLogic.

Campbell was born and raised in Northern California and graduated from Stanford University (Class of 1999) with a degree in English and Dance. She also holds a Master of Fine Arts in Acting from the National Theatre Conservatory (Class of 2003).

Lindsay has appeared on TV shows such as Law & Order and The Sopranos, as well as in the film Our Bundle of Extraordinary Joy. She also performed regularly in New York City as part of the Cabaret Cucaracha. You can also find her in commercials for Crest, Hallmark Cards, Seasonique, Volvo and Earthlink

Campbell is part-owner of Bright Red Pixels, a digital production studio. She hosts Small Business Rules on OpenForum.com, created by Next New Networks.

Lindsay now resides in Los Angeles, after spending six years in New York. She and husband Aaron Nauta welcomed their first child on April 15, 2010.

Lindsay was the host of the new morning news show for AOL called Daybreak which is a co-production of Bright Red Pixels and Ben Silverman's Electus. AOL Daybreak made its debut on November 15, 2010.
