= Yiying Lu =

Emoji designer

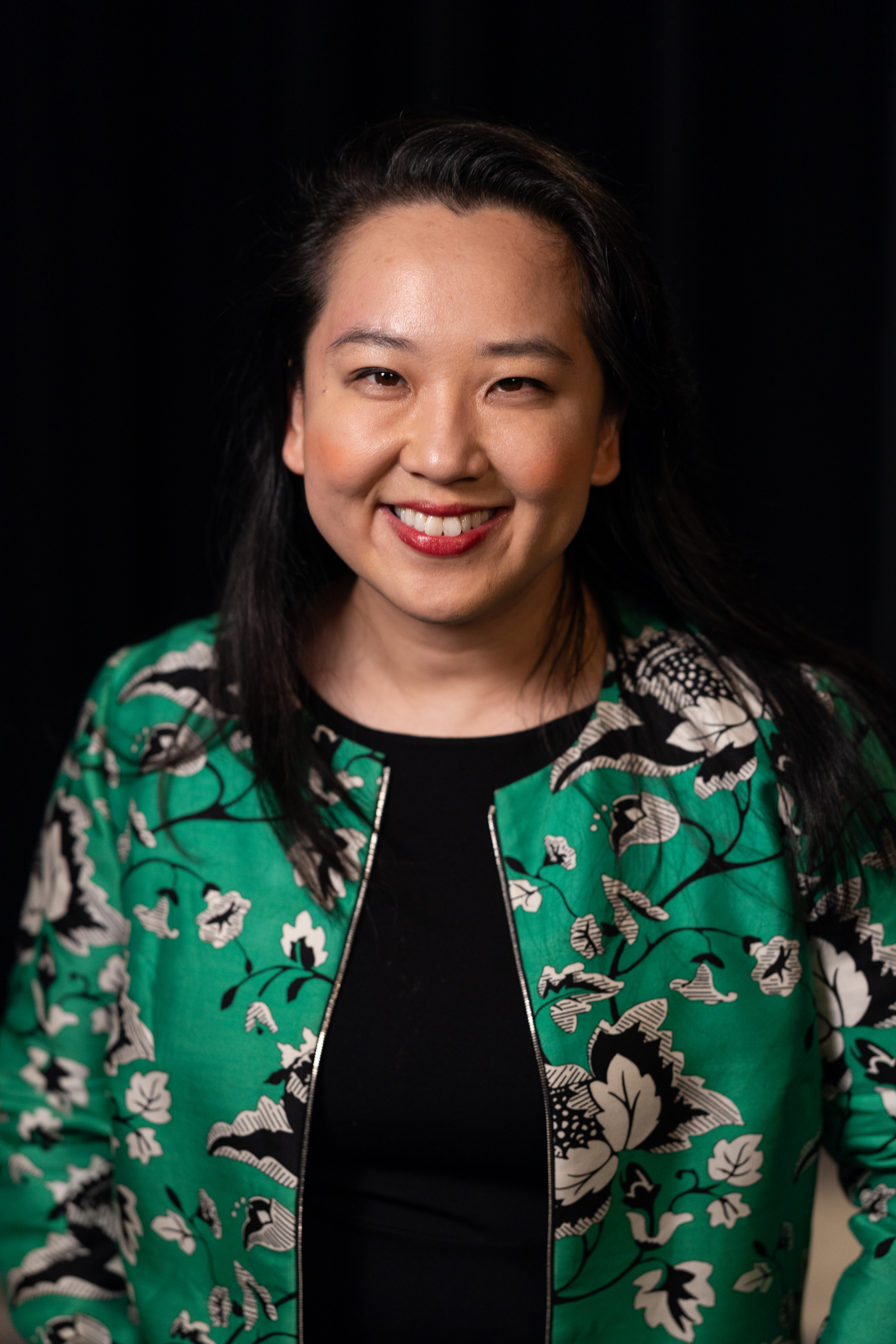
- Lu in 2024
- Born: Shanghai, China
- Citizenship: Australian, American, Chinese
- Education: University of Technology Sydney (BDes); University of the Arts London (BA)
- Occupations: Artist, designer
- Known for: Twitter "Fail Whale", Unicode dumpling (🥟), boba tea (🧋), fortune cookie (🥠), chopsticks (🥢), takeout box (🥡), and peacock (🦚) emojis
- Awards: 1st Shorty Awards winner in Design
- Website: www.yiyinglu.com

Yiying Lu (simplified Chinese: 陆怡颖; traditional Chinese: 陸怡穎; pinyin: Lù Yíyǐng) is an artist and designer recognized for creating the Twitter "Fail Whale" image and the Unicode boba tea emoji (🧋) and dumpling emoji (🥟). She was born in Shanghai, China and educated in Sydney, Australia at University of Technology Sydney and London, UK at Central Saint Martins, University of Arts London. She is based in San Francisco, California, US.

== Career ==
While earning her degree, Lu created a digital artwork titled "Lifting a Dreamer" to send birthday wishes to her friends who were living far away. Lu then posted the image, featuring "a serene whale being lifted out of the water by eight orange birds", to iStock, where Twitter co-founder Biz Stone discovered the image and thought it would make a good error message. Twitter began using the image around May 2008, and one user nicknamed it the Fail Whale. The image gained attention online, leading to the creation of a fan club for the Fail Whale among other positive responses. Lu won the Design category at the 1st Shorty Awards in 2009, and she later credited it to the Fail Whale. In 2010, Lu was commissioned to create an illustration for Conan O'Brien that depicted him riding the Fail Whale to promote his new television show Conan on TBS.

In 2012, Lu was the featured artist for SXSW Interactive Big Bag, given to 30,000 attendees.

In 2014, Lu created Chinese paper-cut versions of Mickey Mouse, Simba, Mulan, Elsa, and Snow White & the Seven Dwarfs for the inaugural recruitment campaign of Shanghai Disneyland opening in 2016.

In 2015, Lu moved to San Francisco, joining the venture capital firm 500 Startups as Creative Director. In the same year, Lu identified the absence of a dumpling emoji on mobile keyboards, designed an early version of the dumpling emoji, and co-founded Emojination with Jennifer 8. Lee. Between 2015 and 2020, Lu created six Unicode emojis: the dumpling (🥟), boba tea (🧋), fortune cookie (🥠), chopsticks (🥢), takeout box (🥡), and peacock (🦚).

In 2017, Lu briefly worked as a creative-in-residence for IDEO Shanghai.

In 2018, she and Jennifer 8. Lee were included in Fast Company's yearly list of the Most Creative People in Business.

In 2020, Lu received an Award of Honor for her logo design for the United Nations' COP 15 Convention on Biological Diversity.

In 2021, Lu was appointed as a Commissioner of Visual Arts for the San Francisco Arts Commission.

In 2022, Lu's Disco Winter Wonder Land & Sea art piece was featured at the San Francisco "Let's Glow SF" public art exhibit.

In 2023, Lu collaborated with the Computer History Museum in Silicon Valley to create a 30-foot wall display titled Little Emoji, Big Story that highlighted advocates behind pro-diversity emojis such as the woman in a hijab (🧕🏻), and multi-skin tone emojis.

In 2024, Lu was a Pantone Spotlight Artist.
