= Person with Headscarf emoji =

Emoji representing the hijab

Person with Headscarf emoji used in Noto

The Person with Headscarf emoji (U+1F9D5 🧕 PERSON WITH HEADSCARF) is an emoji included in the Unicode 10.0 and Emoji 5.0 lists, depicting a person wearing a headscarf wrapped around the top of their head and underneath their chin which is typically used to convey a woman wearing a hijab. The creation of the emoji was petitioned by Rayouf Alhumedhi, designed by Alephandra Messer, and approved by the Unicode Consortium in 2016.

== Development ==
Rayouf Alhumedhi submitted the proposal for the Person with Headscarf emoji as a 15-year-old Saudi Arabian teenager living in Berlin, who wears a hijab and identifies as Muslim. She was motivated to propose the emoji after finding the available emojis insufficient to express herself in a WhatsApp group chat with friends. After searching fruitlessly for an emoji she could represent her identity with, she used a workaround combination of the Man with Turban emoji, the Left-Right Arrow emoji, and the Woman emoji. This experience motivated her to write a proposal, first to Apple's customer service department and then to the Unicode Consortium, as a part of her "Hijab Emoji Project."

Her proposal was supported by Alexis Ohanian, a founder of Reddit, and Jennifer 8. Lee, a member of the Unicode emoji subcommittee and co-founder of Emojination, a group that champions representation and inclusion in emojis. Lee and Alhumedhi commissioned Aphelandra Messer, a graphic designer who rendered the hijab emoji guidance images in accordance with the Google emoji scheme. In this process, color was particularly important as emojis are often used on white backgrounds in keyboards and on blue or gray backgrounds in text messages so the color of the hijab was made a neutral beige to be more culturally accessible and applicable.

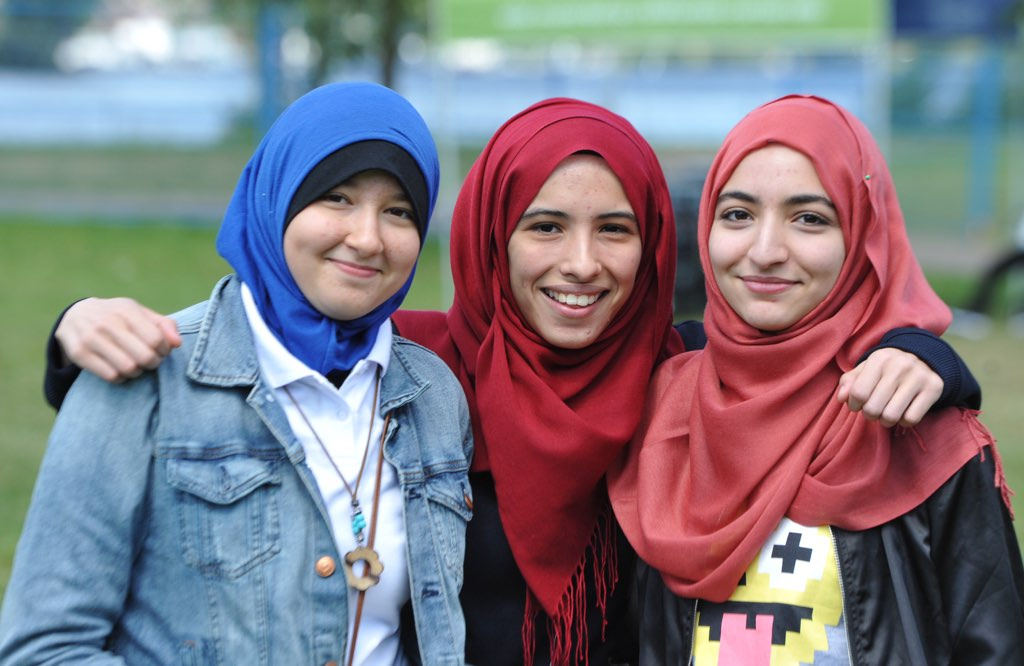
The Person With Headscarf emoji was designed to represent women who wear a hijab.

In her proposal, Alhumedhi referenced roughly 550 million Muslim women who wear the hijab and expressed a need for greater representation by writing, "With this enormous number of people, not a single space on the keyboard is reserved for them." The proposal also emphasized the importance of the hijab as "an integral aspect of women's lives" and the popularity of headscarves that extends beyond the Muslim community. Her proposal garnered much media attention including articles by The New York Times, The Washington Post, BBC, and The Guardian.

The proposal was approved by the Unicode Consortium in November, 2016 and the emoji was unveiled by Apple on World Emoji Day in 2017 along with several other emojis that included a woman breastfeeding and a meditating man. The emoji launched into keyboards in 2017 as "1F9D5 Person With Headscarf" with Messer's design.

Alhumedhi's story of creating the Person with Headscarf emoji is included in the 2019 documentary The Emoji Story by Ian Cheney.

== Usage ==
Character information
Preview	🧕	
Unicode name	PERSON WITH HEADSCARF	
Encodings	decimal	hex
Unicode	129493	U+1F9D5
UTF-8	240 159 167 149	F0 9F A7 95
UTF-16	55358 56789	D83E DDD5
Numeric character reference	&#129493;	&#x1F9D5;

The approval of the Person with Headscarf emoji marked a development in diverse representation and religious iconography available from the Unicode Consortium. As roughly 5 billion emojis are sent through Facebook Messenger worldwide on a daily basis, emojis can serve as a powerful tool for digital representation globally. A factor that contributed to its approval was the potential for high frequency usage, as it is a compound emoji that could be combined with human heads and traditional religious apparel, specifically the hijab. Alhumedhi noted the importance of the emoji in creating representation for Muslim women when stating, "I wanted something to represent me… alongside the millions of women who wear the headscarf every day, and pride themselves on wearing the headscarf."

The unveiling of the Person with Headscarf emoji was the subject of debate and backlash, with some Twitter users accusing the emoji to be a sign of oppression, and Alhumedhi faced many racist reactions to her proposal. However, many praised the emoji as a long overdue sign of acceptance and much needed representation for Muslim women. It also reflected a trend of increasing diversity and inclusion efforts in the Unicode Consortium which had included emojis with more skin colors in 2015. At the same time, additional gender diversity was added in Apple's iOS 10 update.
