= Chris Bashinelli =

American actor and television producer

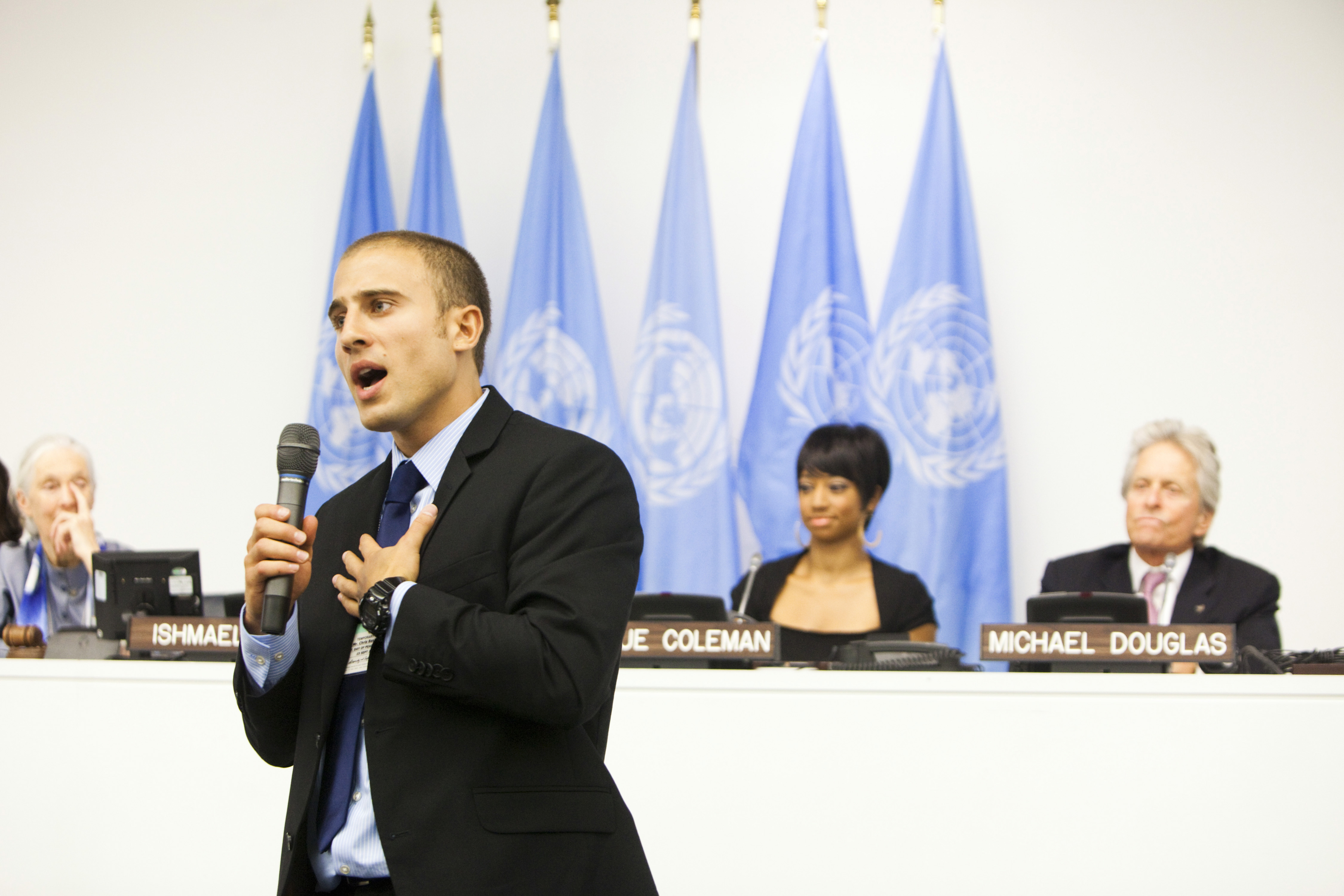
Chris moderating the United Nations International Day of Peace, 2011

Christopher Stephen Peter “Bash” Bashinelli is an American actor, producer, explorer, and television host. He is best known as the executive producer and host of the television series, Bridge the Gap, which currently airs on PBS and the National Geographic channel. Bashinelli is also known for being one of the youngest people to ever moderate an event at the United Nations General Assembly Hall.

== Early life ==
Christopher Bashinelli was born on November 10, 1986, to Stephen and Florence Bashinelli, who are, respectively, of Italian and Lebanese descent. Chris was born and raised in the Bay Ridge neighborhood of Brooklyn, New York and attended Xaverian High School. He attended Marymount Manhattan College and graduated in 2008 with a BA in Theatre Arts.

== Acting career ==
Bashinelli has appeared on television (The Sopranos, 2007) and in several films: How to Grow a Fig Tree (2007), Knock Knock (2007), Last Day of Summer (2009), Good Shot Bash (2009), Take Off (2009), and All Screwed Up (2009).

== United Nations ==
In 2010 Bashinelli moderated the Launch of the International Year of Youth in the United Nations General Assembly Hall with the UN Secretary General, Ban Ki-moon. In 2011, at 24 years old, Bashinelli became the youngest male to moderate the United Nations International Day of Peace.

== Bridge the Gap ==
In 2007, at age 20 Bashinelli went to Tanzania as a part of a study abroad program. When he returned he developed the documentary short, Bridge the Gap: Tanzania (2009), in an attempt to show a positive view of Tanzania and its people. This film premiered at the Zanzibar International Film Festival in Tanzania in 2009.

Following the completion of Bridge the Gap: Tanzania, Bashinelli launched the production company Bridge the Gap TV. Bridge the Gap TV focuses on telling the stories of everyday life in a positive way from areas around the world that often receive negative media attention.

Bridge the Gap TV has produced four episodes of the Bridge the Gap series in addition to Tanzania that are currently airing on PBS and the National Geographic Channel (3). Episodes include Pine Ridge Indian Reservation, Haiti, Uganda and Mongolia.

== National Geographic Young Explorer ==
In 2012 Bashinelli was named a National Geographic Young Explorer, which awards grants to help fund projects “supporting new generations of archaeologists, anthropologists, astronomers, conservationists, ecologists, geographers, geologists, marine scientists, adventurers, storytellers, and pioneers.” Bashinelli used his grant to help fund Bridge the Gap to Mongolia, where he lived as a nomad.

== Filmography ==
Year	Title	Role	Notes
2006	Break the Addiction: An Inconvenient Truth	Himself	TV documentary
2007	Knock Knock	Tommy	Movie
2007	How to Grow a Fig Tree	Michael	Short Movie
2007	The Sopranos	Kevin	Episode: "Kennedy and Heidi"
2009	Last Day of Summer	Skateboarder	Movie
2009	Take Off (2009 short film)	Ernie	Short Movie
2009	Bridge the Gap: Tanzania (Pilot)	Himself	Executive producer, TV Documentary
2011	Bridge the Gap to Uganda	Himself	Executive producer, TV Documentary
2012	Bridge the Gap to Pine Ridge	Himself	Executive producer, TV Documentary
