= StockTwits =

Social media site for investors

Stocktwits
- Website type: Social media
- Founded: 2008
- Headquarters: New York, U.S.
- Area served: Worldwide
- Founders: Howard Lindzon and Soren Macbeth
- Key people: Shiv Sharma (President & COO); Michael Bozzello (Head of Product & Engineering); Howard Lindzon (CEO)
- Employees: 51-200
- Website: stocktwits.com
- Users: 8M+ registered users
- Current status: Active

Stocktwits is a social media platform designed for sharing ideas between investors, traders, and entrepreneurs. Founded in 2008 by Howard Lindzon and Soren McBeth, it introduced the use of the cashtag, a way to group discussions around a stock symbol preceded by a dollar sign. Stocktwits eventually became a standalone network where users share market sentiment, ideas, and strategies in real-time.

== History ==
=== Founding and early years (2008–2013) ===
The idea for the company came from a 2008 blog post where Lindzon suggested that Twitter would be great for stocks and markets even though he once passed on the opportunity to invest in the company. Stocktwits was launched in 2008 by Howard Lindzon and Soren McBeth as a Twitter application that organized financial discussions using cashtags. Lindzon teamed up with Soren Macbeth to form the company in 2009. The company utilized Twitter's application programming interface (API) to integrate StockTwits as its own "highly graphical platform of market news, sentiment and stock-picking tools." StockTwits utilized "cashtags" with the stock ticker symbol, similar to the Twitter hashtag, as a way of indexing people's thoughts and ideas about a company and the stock.

Cashtags were eventually adopted by Twitter itself in 2012.

StockTwits received the first Shorty Award in the 2008 finance category.

StockTwits began offering a service in 2011 that allows companies to manage and monitor information within the service. Lindzon says it also allows a company to "monitor discussion about the company."

Time magazine listed StockTwits as one of its 2010 "50 best websites." StockTwits was named one of the "top 10 most innovative companies in finance" in 2012 by FastCompany.

=== Expansion and product innovation (2013–2023) ===
As of June 2013, StockTwits had raised $8.6 million in venture capital but has not yet made a profit. Fifty percent of the company's revenue comes from financial data sold to clients including Bloomberg L.P. and Google. Lindzon believes a "cultural change" is needed for the large financial institutions to embrace this technology and that change may take as long as five years.

In 2016, Lindzon decided to step down as CEO, although he remained actively involved in the company as its executive chairman.

In June 2016, StockTwits Inc. announced Ian Rosen, a co-founder of Even Financial and former general manager at MarketWatch, as chief executive officer.

In January 2017, StockTwits Inc. acquired Investing Discovery Platform SparkFin Inc.

In December 2017, Stocktwits announced its redesigned web and mobile sites with a new feature called Discover that provided user with important stock information, curated content and earnings calendars.

In August 2018, Stocktwits announced its launch of Rooms, a product that enables users to create new communities based on shared interests, specific stocks or trends affecting the markets.

In October 2018, Stocktwits announced the launch of its Premium Rooms product at Stocktoberfest West, the company's premier event held in Coronado, California. The new feature as a part of Rooms offers users unprecedented access to exclusive content, concepts, and analysis from top investors on a subscription basis.

In December 2018, Brian Norgard, former head of product at dating app Tinder, joined the board of directors of StockTwits to help the company expand into new areas of financial technology and media.

In April 2019, Stocktwits announced it would launch a Stocktwits Trade App, a zero-commission brokerage service that allowed users to place unlimited free equity trades and featured fractional investments. The app was offered by Stocktwits subsidiary ST Invest LLC, a registered broker-dealer and member of the Financial Industry Regulatory Authority.

The platform also explored various monetization strategies, including premium subscriptions and B2B data offerings. During this time, the company announced its entry into crypto trading and expanded its presence in international markets, including India.

In December 2021, Stocktwits raised 30M$ for its seed B funding round and announced its next big moves including a boost in its crypto coverage and plans to launch in India by Q2 in 2022. The series B funding set Stocktwits at a valuation of $210 million.

In February 2022, Stocktwits launched its crypto trading platform.

In July 2022, Stocktwits launched equities trading on its platforms for individual investors.

In July 2024, Stockwits partnered with Quatr to offer financial content via an API, including live and recorded earnings calls from public companies; annual reports and quarterly filings and more.

=== Howard Lindzon's return as CEO (2024–present) ===
In 2024, Howard Lindzon returned as CEO of Stocktwits. Under Lindzon's leadership, Stocktwits decided to exit the brokerage business by selling TradeApp to Public.com in 2024. As a part of Howard's return, Stocktwits' leadership team included Shiv Sharma, President and COO.

== Use ==
In 2013, StockTwits had over 230,000 active members; by 2020 that number had increased to 3 million, and by 2021 the homepage dashboard shows 5 million members. Lindzon encourages new traders to spend time on StockTwits learning the language. He says that "You don’t learn Spanish in one day, and you’re not going to learn how to invest in stocks in one day. Treat it like a language." Lindzon coauthored the book The StockTwits Edge: 40 Actionable Trade Set-Ups from Real Market Pros with Philip Pearlman and Ivaylo Ivanoff to assist new users with getting the most out of the service.

== Platform features ==
StockTwits allows users to communicate to Ticker Streams in real time with the use of cashtags. Users are also able to communicate directly using the "@" symbol before a username, a feature seen on Twitter.

Content featured on StockTwits can also be shared to the StockTwits extended network which includes sites such as Yahoo Finance and CNN Money. Users also have the ability to share content to their personal Twitter, LinkedIn and Facebook accounts.

As of 2012 StockTwits has an open API allowing other sites such as TradingView, LikeAssets and HootSuite to integrate their users with StockTwits.

=== Cashtags ===
The cashtag, a concept introduced by Stocktwits, allows users to track conversations related to specific stocks by preceding the ticker symbol with a dollar sign. This feature allows users to follow discussions and insights related to their investments.

=== TradeApp (2019–2024) ===
TradeApp provided users with commission-free trading directly through the platform. The app was designed to compete with other retail brokerage services and to integrate trading with the social aspects of Stocktwits. However, in 2024, the brokerage business was sold to Public.com.

=== Data and analytics ===
Stocktwits has amassed user-generated content over the years, which it has leveraged to provide data and analytics. The platform's data on retail investor sentiment has been packaged into products for investors. The company has explored various monetization strategies, including the sale of its data through APIs and premium subscriptions for advanced analytics.

=== Stocktwits India ===
In 2021, Stocktwits expanded into India through a partnership with Times Bridge, the VC arm of the Times Group.

Stocktwits India has also formed partnerships with top financial publishers, including Economic Times, CNBC TV18, and Business Insider India.

== Controversy ==
Twitter incorporated the cashtags into their platform in 2012 effectively "hijacking" the StockTwits idea. In response to this announcement, Lindzon blogged that "It's interesting that Twitter has hijacked our creation of $TICKER i.e. $AAPL". He went on to note that "You can hijack a plane but it does not mean you know how to fly it." Lindzon sold all of his Twitter stock in 2012 as a result of this controversy.

== See also ==
- Robinhood Markets
- r/wallstreetbets
