= Athletes for a Cure =

Fundraising and awareness program

- Company type: Non-Profit
- Founded: 2006
- Headquarters: 1250 Fourth Street; Santa Monica, CA 90401
- Parent: Prostate Cancer Foundation

Athletes for a Cure is a fundraising and awareness program of the Prostate Cancer Foundation. The organization assists athletes in their quest to raise money for better treatments and a cure for prostate cancer. Athletes for a Cure was founded in 2006.

== Mission ==
Athletes for a Cure was founded to create a community of people wishing to join together to fight prostate cancer. All monies raised from the program go directly to the Prostate Cancer Foundation and the research projects funded by the PCF.

The Athletes for a Cure website provides athletes and organizers with the opportunity to create personalized homepages and be a part of the prostate cancer fundraising community. Registered participants can choose to upload their own photos, add personal stories to the website and even add race information to their own page. The website also allows users to define and set donation goals, send emails to their friends and family, and provides various tools to track and monitor their donations.

== Events ==
Athletes for a Cure has an event model called "Any Event, Anytime, Anywhere", developed by Scott Zagarino, where athletes can raise prostate cancer awareness in any way they choose. The program has many additional opportunities and special events that have joined forces with Athletes for a Cure in order to increase support.

== Media Campaigns ==
Athletes for a Cure makes extensive use of social networking to "create a sustainable event fundraising model in a completely new paradigm," according to founder Scott Zagarino.

In January 2009, Athletes for a Cure won the Shorty Award for Best Producer of Nonprofit Twitter Content.
