= List of The Riches characters =

This is a list of fictional characters in the television series The Riches. The article deals with the series' main, recurring, and minor characters.

== Malloy/"Rich" Family ==
Name	Portrayed by	Description
Wayne Malloy	Eddie Izzard	Wayne is the paternal head of the Malloy family (not to be confused with the extended Malloy 'clan'). He is a consummate, intelligent grifter and thief who experienced an 'existential crisis' while his wife was serving time in prison. He has become disillusioned with the nomadic, scamming lifestyle of the Travellers; it was his idea to steal the identities of deceased Doug and Cherien Rich and settle down into a normal life. Dahlia has referred to him as a 'halfbreed' or 'half buffer'. He is revealed to be Irish, and to have lived in an orphanage before the travelers took him in.
Dahlia Malloy	Minnie Driver	Dahlia is Wayne's wife. Newly out on parole, Dahlia's behavior is erratic and unpredictable, possibly exacerbated by drug habits picked up in prison. A recovering methamphetamine addict, we've seen Dahlia take a wide array of legal and illegal drugs since her parole, but recently she appears to be trying to get clean. Dahlia is considered 'royalty' in their Traveller clan, and her connection to the clan (both by blood and ideology) appears to be much stronger than Wayne's. She was initially very skeptical of Wayne's plan to leave their old lifestyle and impersonate the Riches, but has helped him work the con and done her part to assume the identity of Cherien Rich. Out of guilt over her current lifestyle, Dahlia has recently turned herself in for parole violation.
Cael Malloy	Noel Fisher	Cael is the eldest Malloy son. He appears rather quiet and shady, yet is very intelligent. His skills include carrying out petty cash-register cons ("I gave you a twenty!"), faking epileptic seizures, picking locks, and disabling alarm systems. While his sister Di Di seems to be more loyal to their father, Cael is more supportive of their mother and the traditional Traveller lifestyle and beliefs. Likewise, his reception to the "Rich" lifestyle is not quite as enthusiastic as that of his ambitious father. Shortly after assuming the identities of the Riches and enrolling in preparatory school, Cael continues his criminal ways after he decides to assist two wayward classmates in breaking into the school to change the grade-records (episode 4). He is later expelled from school for this and fed up with the "buffer" lifestyle Cael leaves Edenfalls towards the end of the series.
Delilah "Di Di" Malloy	Shannon Marie Woodward	Di Di is the adolescent daughter of Wayne and Dahlia. Like the other Malloy children, she is intelligent and crafty, and is adept at various scams and thievery. In the opening scene of the pilot she is seen pickpocketing people at a high school class reunion while Wayne distracts them. On Dahlia's first night out of prison, Di Di is the one who finds her mother passed out, cough syrup bottle in hand, with needle marks showing on her arm. Di Di's relationship with her mother appears to be strained; when it temporarily seemed the family would split up, Di Di chose to stay with her father (Wayne). In the first season she struck up a relationship with classmate and neighbor Erick however in the second season she becomes friendly and later sleeps with a young Edenfalls security guard named Ike. Like her father, she is more open to the lifestyle they have found assuming the identity of the Rich family. Unlike most her family however, as the series progressed, she has become more positive at the opportunities a normal life can bring in comparison to her previous nomadic traveler lifestyle.
Sam Malloy	Aidan Mitchell	Sam, the youngest Malloy child, is transgender and frequently dresses in feminine clothing. The idea for Sam's non-binary gender expression came about before Izzard, a gender non-conforming comedian, joined the show. Sam's gender expression is accepted and respected by the Malloy parents and siblings. On their first night in the Riches' home, Sam draws a large mural on a bedroom wall depicting the family's recent adventures, including the car accident and Dahlia's release from prison. Sam quickly falls in love with Rosemere Academy, a private school the family cons their way into, in spite of being a quiet and somewhat shy child. Sam is most comfortable when wearing feminine clothing, and is much more shy when circumstances do not permit it.

== Travellers ==
Name	Portrayed by	Description
Dale Malloy	Todd Stashwick	Dahlia's cousin, and self-proclaimed new head of the Malloy Traveller clan. Dale has a violent and unpredictable temper. He and Wayne seem to have a long-standing hatred for each other. Dale was a former rival for Dahlia's affections, ultimately losing out to Wayne. He has shown flashes of sociopathic behavior from early childhood, culminating in him murdering his father to usurp leadership of the clan. After torturing Ken to exact information on the Malloy's location, Dale travels to Edenfalls and works his way into the Malloy's con first by initiating a sexual relationship with Hartley Underwood, and then by blackmailing Wayne into letting him on as a partner in his con and giving him a job as a mail-boy at PANCO.
Earl Malloy (deceased)	Red West	Dale's father; former head of the Malloy clan. His unspecified illness has left him an invalid and unable to speak. When Wayne was stealing the family bank from a safe in Earl's room, Earl could have sounded the alarm by ringing a bell, but apparently chose not to; it was later indicated that he preferred Wayne as the next clan head. He seems to have been a good leader, winning the love, respect and admiration of both Dale and Wayne. Earl was eventually murdered by Dale, who feared losing his power within the clan.
Ginny Dannegan	Nichole Hiltz	A social climber within the clan, she is determined to marry her slow-witted brother Ken to Di Di to secure a connection between her family and the ruling Malloy line. Although she is pregnant she continually drinks. Dale approved of her match without the knowledge of Wayne or Dahlia. Ginny and Dale are increasingly at odds, with Ginny attempting to undermine Dale's aims to become the new clan boss. In the second season, she is seen with a child having given birth though the child's sex is a mystery. It is heavily implied that her father and uncle were murdered by Eamon Quinn.
Ken Dannegan	Nate Mooney	Ginny's brother, who is in love with Di Di, but extremely dim-witted due to a fever he suffered in his youth. Ginny attempts to blackmail the Malloy's into marrying off Di Di to Ken, until Ken finally realizes that Di Di doesn't love him or want to marry him, and agrees to let her go, promising he will protect the family from Ginny. After the Malloys escape from the forced marriage attempt, Dale tortures Ken to exact the Malloy's location.
Tammy Simms	Johanna E. Braddy	Cael's girlfriend. He left her behind at the Traveller camp when the family fled; Dale used her, against her will, in an attempt to find out where the Malloys had gone with the family bank, an attempt which proved at first unfruitful for Dale, but which led Ginny back to the Riches' house, ultimately opening the entire Traveller can-of-worms over the Malloys.
Linda & Mick O'Malley	Andrea Frankle, John McConnell	Travellers from another clan who come across Wayne and the family at a gas station as they are making their escape from the Malloy camp. Wayne and Mick have a disagreement, ending in an RV chase that ultimately causes the car accident which kills the real Riches. Dale asks them to kill Wayne, but Mick winds up accidentally shooting Linda in the shoulder.
Eamon Quinn	Jared Harris	A Traveller released from prison as of Season 2 who is involved with Dale's blackmailing of the Malloys. Like Wayne, he is relatively intelligent, frequently quoting authors like Joyce and Yeats, and claims to have received a Master's in Philosophy from the University of Phoenix while in prison. He has a history of bad blood with Wayne and the Malloy family prior to his incarceration that is implied to have involved betrayals and at least several murders. Following Cael's leaving Edenfalls, Quinn begins to act as somewhat of a father figure toward him, a position he uses as leverage to get closer to Wayne's Bayou Hills operation.
Rosaleen	Sarah Jones	A young Traveller currently widowed from her young husband. She met Cael after he left Edenfalls and became romantically involved with him, convincing him to join her in her travels, which ultimately brought him back to the Traveler's camp and Quinn.

== Edenfalls ==
A gated community in Ducaine, it's mentioned that the houses of Edenfalls cost upwards of two million dollars. The Edenfalls homeowners association is headed by Hartley Underwood.

Name	Portrayed by	Description
Nina Burns	Margo Martindale	Nina and her husband Jim are the first people to meet the Malloys after they move into the house and assume the Riches' identities. Nina quickly befriends Dahlia after sharing her prescription pills with during Dahlia's crystal meth withdrawal. Nina has been married to Jim for 25 years, but they have not had sex for several years due to Jim's gradual coming-out as a homosexual. Early on, Nina's sexual frustration is comically highlighted through various phallic props. Nina catches on to the goings-on of the Riches, leading Dahlia to confess their situation to her. Nina is the only "buffer" the Malloys, and especially Dahlia, confide in to any extent. Unhappy with her own life, she ends up getting involved in the ongoing scams of the Malloy family, and goes on the lam with Dahlia when she runs away with the children at the end of Season 1. After returning to Edenfalls in the beginning of Season 2, Nina becomes frustrated with Dahlia due to her refusal to be honest with her.
Jim Burns (deceased)	Bruce French	Jim, Nina's husband, is a closeted homosexual until Dahlia's friend, Chunky Kay, outs him at a dinner party. After being outed, Jim's partner Wes moves into Jim and Nina's house. The married couple work out "an understanding", deciding that foregoing divorce is the best option for them both as well as their daughter, Zoey. After consuming various recreational drugs, Jim dies of a sudden heart attack at his birthday party/coming out party while playing charades.
Hartley Underwood	Kaitlin Olson	Head of the Edenfalls homeowners' association and the Malloys' front-door neighbor, Hartley had their RV towed after they parked it on her lawn. Hartley lost her arm to an alligator that came from a swamp located in a subdivision Panco developed on in clear criminal negligence, and filed suit for personal damages. The lawsuit was dropped after Wayne and Aubrey dug up dirt of her history of kleptomania. Hartley has struck up an odd friendship with Dale Malloy, who is attempting to infiltrate Edenfalls to confront the Malloys. She is married to an older man for his money.
Ike	Michael Welch	Ike is a security guard at Edenfalls, currently working for his father and does not like his job. As of the second season, he has developed a romantic relationship with DiDi. In the second season finale, he and DiDi lose their virginities to each other.

== Panco ==
A highly unethical real estate firm where Wayne Malloy bluffs his way into a job as legal counsel.

Name	Portrayed by	Description
Hugh Panetta	Gregg Henry	A wealthy real-estate mogul with a penchant for guns and alcohol, Hugh started off "piss-broke" but built the Panco empire starting with buying and reselling used septic systems. Wayne meets Hugh while golfing with Jim Burns, making a wager over the golf game and losing to Wayne. Wayne wins a job-offer from a law-firm, but after Hugh tells Wayne he will have supervisors breathing down his neck at a law firm, Hugh convinces Wayne to work as inhouse-counsel for Panco instead. Hugh has been married multiple times, most recently to a stripper, GiGi, from Las Vegas during Season 2. A recovered drug addict, Hugh is inveigled to relapse by Dahlia's fellow ex-con Chunky Kay. Wayne's constant work to keep Hugh and Panco afloat and ingratiate himself into a position as a Panco partner lead Hugh to consider Wayne, or as he thinks, Doug, as his closest and only real friend. Towards the end of Season 2, Hugh decides to run for Mayor of Ducaine.
Aubrey	Deidrie Henry	A paralegal at Panco who attends law school on nights, Wayne uses Aubrey heavily to work the legal aspect of cases for him, instrumental to the success of his con. She repeatedly saves Wayne from being revealed as a fraud, and quickly catches on that he is not actually a lawyer, but chooses not to investigate the extent of Wayne's fraud any further due to her great respect for Wayne's human sympathies, which she sees as otherwise lacking at Panco.
Kimmie	Teresa Huang	An easily excited, eager Panco employee. Kimmie is extremely polite and cheerful to everyone at Panco and appreciates Doug a lot.
Tony	Michael Gambino	An employee of Panco. While undertaking a lie detector test, it's apparently revealed that Tony isn't his real name. In Episode 11, he requests from Wayne that he be allowed his own parking space with his name written on it.
Greg	Yvans Jourdain	An employee of Panco, who requests from Wayne that he be allowed his own office.
Georgia "GiGi" Panetta	Julie Ann Emery	An exotic dancer from Vegas who Hugh fell in love with and married, GiGi is reluctant to sign a post-nuptial agreement with Hugh, though she denies she is a gold digger. Dahlia convinces GiGi to sign the postnuptial agreement by telling her to include clauses such as heavy penalties if Hugh is unfaithful – and that they will not engage in certain sexual positions. The couple are fairly unstable, with GiGi kicking Hugh out of the house for weeks shortly after their marriage, getting back together just in time for Hugh's political campaign for Mayor of Ducaine, for which Wayne tries hard to cover up her stripper past.

== The Rosemere Academy ==
Name	Portrayed by	Description
Jane Fedley	Lee Garlington	The Principal of Rosemere, who upon discovering the changes made to grade-records, expels Cael. Her bookshelf contains The Story of Civilization by Will and Ariel Durant.
Brent	Michael Trevino	After Cael steals his Mercedes, Brent asks him to help break into the school so he can change his grades via the computer system. Cael suggests they turn the grade-changing operation into a business, which ultimately leads to the entire group of students involved being caught. He has a crush on Dahlia, and it's implied he has an abusive father.
Erick	Stephen Sowan	A pot-smoking, guitar-playing teenager who attends Rosemere Academy and shares a class with Di Di. She first encounters him in episode 3; by episode 4 they have played guitar together and shared a kiss. Cael seems to dislike Erick a great deal and is openly unfriendly to him; he also harasses Di Di about him often. He has not been seen or heard of since the first season.

== The Riches ==
Name	Portrayed by	Description
Doug Rich (deceased)	Mitchell Laurance	Doug Rich was a successful, if unpopular lawyer in Tampa, Florida. Doug attended Princeton Law School, where he apparently sold cocaine for money. (Princeton does not have a law school; it is uncertain if the writers did not want to use a real law school or if Doug lied about his credentials while still alive). He was killed on the way to his new home in Louisiana after being run off road by an RV driven by the O'Malleys (who were attempting to chase down the Malloys in their RV after an altercation). When asked for a reference, previous employers have warned new potential employers away from him. According to his first wife, he abandoned his first wife and children. Doug was a Republican and had very few friends; only Pete, a close friend, attempted to contact Doug after his move to Louisiana.
Cherien Rich (deceased)	Chandler McIntyre	A highly regarded dental hygienist; she and Doug married two years before their deaths. Many of the Malloys' clues about the original Riches come from social contacts Cherien made in preparation for their upcoming move, such as contacting a local Jewish group. She was killed by being thrown from the car the Riches were driving in, and was dead by the time the Malloys reached the car, though Dahlia tried to perform CPR on her.
Jolinda Rich	Martha Hackett	Doug's ex-wife. She managed to track down Wayne (Doug), because Doug owed $75,000 in alimony. Wayne manages to pay it back by selling one of Jim Burns' alpacas. In Episode 12, Dahlia pretends to be Jolinda on the phone when Pete calls asking about Doug.
Dr. Morgenstern	Peggy Stewart	The mother of the late Cherien Rich. She had been estranged from her daughter and son-in-law and living in a nursing home in Mississippi. Wayne takes Dr. Morgenstern home to Edenfalls when he realizes how expensive the nursing home is. She apparently disliked Cherien, and refers to her as a 'bitch' at one point. Dr. Morgenstern uses a wheelchair and is very senile; she often arbitrarily exclaims, "I made some calls," and frequently asks for various gourmet coffees. She also frequently says "You're not Cherein" to Dahlia. She smokes pot and drinks alcohol.
Pete (deceased)	Arye Gross	A friend of the deceased Doug Rich, Pete is a needy and unstable man. He was conned into believing Doug wasn't really his friend when he shows up at Wayne and Dahlia's house. They convince him to believe that Doug must have given him the wrong address in order to avoid him. Eventually, Pete tries to commit suicide, but is saved by Wayne and Dahlia, who feel guilty as they believe they drove him to the suicide attempt. Pete finally discovers Wayne's con when he goes back to the Riches' house again, and, finding no one home, speaks with their neighbor Jim Burns. The Malloys try to escape from Pete before the law comes down on them by drugging Pete and taking off, but Dale, who has been trying to elbow into Wayne's con, sabotages their RV and murders Pete to keep the con alive. Pete, like Doug, has very few friends who would come looking for him, but he has as mother who hires a private investigator to go looking for Pete when he appears missing.
