= PeggyOlson =

Twitter micro-blog

- Website type: Micro-blog
- Available in: English
- Website: twitter.com/PeggyOlson
- Launched: August 2008; 18 years ago

PeggyOlson is a micro-blog hosted on the website Twitter. It is written in the voice of Mad Men character Peggy Olson. She describes herself as "Sr. copywriter at Sterling Cooper Draper Pryce. Rising star on Madison Ave." located in "New York City, 1963" and has over 23,000 followers. The Twitter account is run by Carri Bugbee, a marketing consultant from Portland, Oregon. She created the Twitter account "to see what kind of potential Twitter had to build brand without being obvious." AMC's lawyers did not approve of her Twitter account; she received an "account suspended" notice from Twitter shortly after she started tweeting, but after her Twitter fans protested, her account was reinstated.

Her win in the Advertising category of the 2009 Shorty Awards "really got everyone in the contest talking" and "outrag[ed] some of the real-life ad shops in the running", who Rickrolled her in retaliation.
