= Dekko =

American 3D mapping and augmented reality company

- Industry: Software
- Founded: 2011
- Founder: Silka Sietsma; Matt Miesnieks
- Defunct: 2014
- Headquarters: San Francisco

Dekko was a San Francisco based company developing a 3D mapping and augmented reality engine. Dekko announced it would develop software that digitally recreates a scene allowing apps and users to interact with their real world surroundings using a built in camera on smart phones or wearable devices like Google Glass. It was founded in 2011 by Silka Sietsma and Matt Miesnieks.

Dekko raised $3.2 million in early funding rounds. Their first game, Tabletop Speed, is an augmented reality race car game for iOS devices. Dekko had announced that it was working on augmented reality apps for Android and Google Glass.

Its last published notice on Twitter was in April 2014, where it announced that "(expect temp twitter silence 4 a while)".
