= Emojination =

Advocacy organisation

Emojination is a grassroots organization that designs and advocates for the additions of inclusive emojis to be added to the Unicode Standard. Established in 2015, it was founded by Jennifer Lee and Yiying Lu. Emojination's motto is “Emoji by the people, for the people” and the founders help individuals to submit emoji proposals to Unicode. Lee and Lu were listed on Fast Company's list of 100 most creative business people in 2017 for their emoji work. It has co-authored over sixty emoji proposals, including a disco ball emoji, pinched fingers emoji, and long drum emoji.

== Founding ==
After realizing that there was no dumpling emoji in August 2015, Jennifer 8. Lee and Yiying Lu were motivated to create one themselves with Lu as the artist and Lee as the advocate. Lee purchased a non-voting membership to the Unicode Consortium, a nonprofit consortium whose members select emojis to be added to universal character set, and sat in on a meeting of the group committee in charge of regulating emojis, the Unicode Technical Committee. This attendance provided Lee with the technical insight of emoji applications and their implementation. A Kickstarter campaign in 2015 raised double the funds needed to help them pay the $7500 fee to join the Unicode Consortium as a voting member.

== Emojis ==
Following the success of their initial campaign and realising the huge challenge that existed for everyday people to contribute new emojis, Emojination looked to broaden its scope. It sought to enable individuals to work together with Emojination to write emoji proposals for submission to the Unicode Consortium. The first of these included working with Rayouf Alhumedhi to develop emoji's featuring people wearing headscarfs. Emojination provided support to Florie Hutchinson in 2017 to help develop the ballet flat shoe. They teamed up again to develop a swimsuit emoji, to offer less sexualised swimwear options. In 2019, Emojination, in partnership with Tinder, helped develop a series of emojis featuring gender-neutral interracial couples. The organisation successfully submitted a proposal for the inclusion of a hippopotamus emoji. Emojination collaborated with Theo Shear, a US videographer, in the creation of the beaver emoji. During the development of the piñata emoji, Emojination provided research input to Rebecca Blaesing's application and connected Rebecca with designer Gabriella Gomez-Mont. Heart and lung emojis were developed together with Melissa Thermidor of the NHS and Christian Kamkoff of Columbia University.

== Emojicon ==
In partnership with Jeanne Brooks, Emojination created the Emojicon event in 2016. The event aimed to work with brands on how to leverage emoji's in their communications and to facilitate policy discussions relating to emojis. The event was held again in 2018.

== Documentary ==
In 2019, directors Martha Shane and Ian Cheney released The Emoji Story (original title: Picture Character), a documentary about the rise of emojis. The film follows some Emojination's proposal writers as they endeavor to add emojis to the universal keyboard.
