= Howard Lindzon =

Author and financial analyst

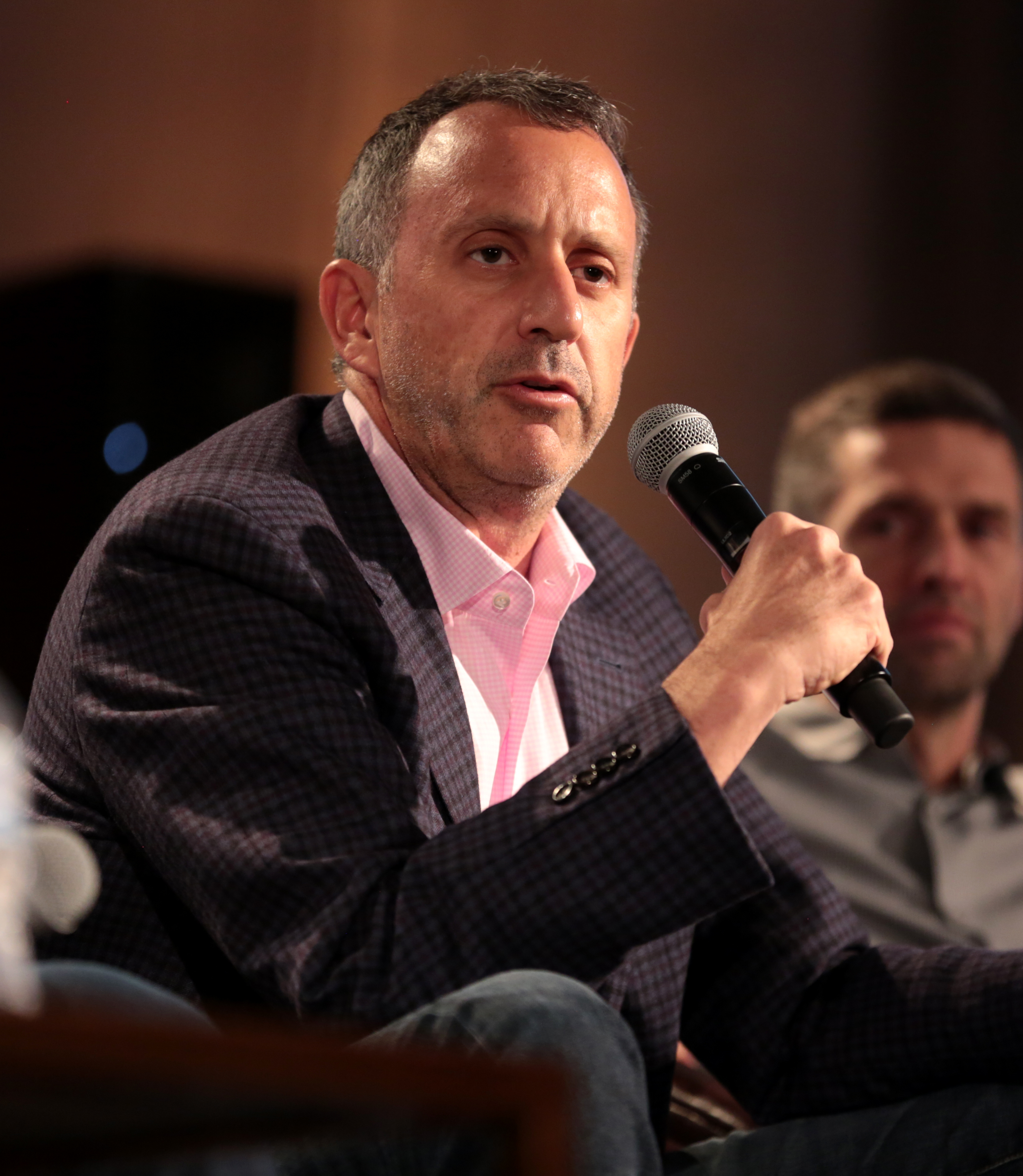
- Born: Toronto, Ontario, Canada
- Occupations: Non-fiction writer, financial analyst, angel investor, hedge-fund manager
- Spouse: Ellen Lindzon
- Writing career
- Notable works: The Wallstrip (TM) Edge: Using Trends to Make Money – Find Them, Ride Them, and Get Off 2009; The StockTwits Edge: 40 Actionable Trade Set-Ups from Real Market Pros 2011

Howard Lindzon is a Canadian author, financial analyst, technical analyst and super angel investor. Lindzon manages a hedge fund, serves as managing partner of the holding company Social Leverage, limited partner at Knight's Bridge Capital Partners, and is the co-founder of StockTwits. Lindzon was named one of The Best Tweets for Your Money in 2013 by Barron's.

== Background ==
Lindzon went to High School at Forest Hill Collegiate Institute where he graduated in 1986. He then went on to receive a Bachelor of Commerce from the University of Western Ontario before moving to the United States to attend Arizona State University for a Master of Business Administration. Lindzon later received a Masters in International Management from the Thunderbird School of Global Management in 1991.

While Lindzon was in high school, his parents divorced and his mother trusted him to manage their money. The first stock he purchased was Clearly Canadian and the loss from that trade impacted his philosophy of defensive money management and his own characterization of risk.

Lindzon met his future wife, Ellen, through a blind date in Phoenix, Arizona and they were married on May 7, 1994. They currently reside in Phoenix, Arizona with their two children, Max and Rachel.

Lindzon's first investment was in 1994 with a company named Pro-Innovative Concepts following graduate school. Phoenix resident Mark Scatterday created The Gripp that sold enough products to become a QVC hall of fame for the product.

In June 1998, Lindzon began managing his hedge fund. His brokerage firm endured some financial hardships in 2002 due to his partner's "thievery and fraud". Lindzon was principal at Knight's Bridge Capital Partners but now serves as a limited partner. He utilizes funds for his work as an angel investor.

== Wallstrip ==
Wallstrip was a daily business satire news video podcast launch in October 16, 2006. Founder and sole creator of the podcast, Lindzon described his vision for the show in the first teaser of two teasers that were released two days beforehand. The initial concept was to highlight publicly traded companies whose stock was trading at or near an all-time high. In May 2007, the program was acquired by CBS's interactive unit at an estimated value of US$5 million.

Just two months short of the second anniversary show, the offerings of episodes stopped abruptly with no prior announcements after the final episode on December 12, 2008. As the podcast was not generating the anticipated revenue, despite the popularity of the show, it appeared that CBS would no longer provide on-going funding. In all, around 500 episodes were produced during the 26-month period.

Lindzon published his first book The Wallstrip (TM) Edge: Using Trends to Make Money – Find Them, Ride Them, and Get Off in 2009 discussing market trends, company research, and risk management.

== 2008 SEC short selling ban ==
The U.S. Securities and Exchange Commission (SEC) initiated a temporary ban on short selling on 799 financial stocks from September 19, 2008 until October 2, 2008 in an effort to slow the bear market. Lindzon was an opponent to the short lived SEC short selling ban in 2008 calling it "a disservice to investors and market participants." "I think the market was well on its way to a crash and I think it would have ended a lot faster if they hadn’t intervened this way," Lindzon said. "For people who were really doing good work on Wall Street to get punished like this, it's a shame that their models went right out the window." " An assessment of the effect of the temporary ban on short-selling in the United States and other countries during the 2008 financial crisis showed that it had only "little impact" on the movements of stocks, with stock prices moving in the same way as they would have moved anyhow, but the ban reduced volume and liquidity.

== StockTwits ==
Lindzon was an early user of Twitter but once passed on the opportunity to invest in the company. Lindzon still ended up with shares of Twitter due to his investment in BetaWorks when Twitter acquired Summize for its search engine.

The idea for the company came from a 2008 blog post where Lindzon suggested that Twitter would be great for stocks and markets. StockTwits began in 2009 with Lindzon and Soren Macbeth by utilizing Twitter's application programming interface (API) to integrate StockTwits as its own "highly graphical platform of market news, sentiment and stock-picking tools." StockTwits received the first annual Shorty Award in the 2008 finance category. Time magazine listed StockTwits as one of their 2010 "50 Best Websites". StockTwits was named one of the "top 10 most innovative companies in finance" in 2012 by FastCompany.

StockTwits utilized what some have called "cashtags" to identify a stock ticker symbol, similar to the Twitter hashtag, as a way of indexing people's thoughts and ideas about a company and the stock. Twitter incorporated the "cashtags" into their platform in 2012 effectively "hijacking" the StockTwits idea. In response to this announcement, Lindzon blogged that "It's interesting that Twitter has hijacked our creation of $TICKER i.e. $AAPL". He went on to note that "You can hijack a plane but it does not mean you know how to fly it."" Lindzon sold all of his Twitter stock in 2012 as a result of this controversy.

As of 2011, the number of monthly visitors to StockTwits had tripled over traffic from the previous year to over 100,000 users. Lindzon encourages new traders to spend time on StockTwits learning the language. He says that "You don’t learn Spanish in one day, and you’re not going to learn how to invest in stocks in one day. Treat it like a language." Lindzon coauthored the book The StockTwits Edge: 40 Actionable Trade Set-Ups from Real Market Pros with Philip Pearlman and Ivaylo Ivanhoff to assist new users with getting the most out of the service.

Lindzon was named one of The Best Tweets for Your Money in 2013. Later that same year, Lindzon invested $50,000 from his hedge fund to follow traders as a part of a "social investing and social leverage" collaboration with Ditto Trade and his own StockTwits network.

As of June 2013, StockTwits has raised $8.6 million in venture capital but has not yet made a profit. Fifty percent of the company's revenue comes from financial data sold to clients including Bloomberg L.P. and Google. Lindzon believes a "cultural change" is needed for the large financial institutions to embrace this technology and that change may take as long as five years.

== Mentoring ==
Lindzon is highly accessible and provides formal and informal mentoring to entrepreneurs. DreamIt Ventures is a startup accelerator program that includes Lindzon as a mentor. He also mentors start-ups as part of the Techstars program.

Networking is a priority for Lindzon. Networks include both real collaborators but could mean access to his Twitter network as he did for James Altucher in the launch of his 140Love online dating business.

The 2010 LeWeb international technology conference hosted Lindzon as the keynote speaker. Lindzon spoke on why there's never been a better time to build a business at The Next Web Conference 2011.

== Angel investor ==
Lindzon is an angel investor and the managing partner for holding company Social Leverage. Social Leverage invests in web businesses that are early in their development.

eBay bought rent.com in 2005 for $415 million. Lindzon had been an early investor in rent.com.

LifeLock, an identity theft protection company offering services intended to detect fraudulent applications for various credit and non-credit related services, received funding from Lindzon in 2007.

Ticketfly was started in 2008 with funding from Lindzon in concert with High Peaks Venture Partners, Contour Venture Partners and another angel investor Roger Ehrenberg.

Lindzon sold his interest in limos.com, and Comcast purchased golfnow.com in 2008.

Lindzon has invested in Betaworks and with them like he did in supporting TweetDeck.

Disqus is an online discussion and commenting service for websites and online communities that uses a networked platform that received funding from Lindzon in 2008.

UserVoice received funding from Lindzon in 2009 to continue development of their customer engagement tools. Their customer feedback aggregation tools were moved into the mainstream with this additional financing.

Holding a previous investment in bit.ly, Lindzon decided to increase his investment to assist with the company's growth in 2010.

InternMatch provides internship services for students, employers and educators. The site offers free internship searching, an intern blog, and a library of internship and job-search resources designed for both students and employers. InternMatch's mission is to "Help students find and explore great internships with a focus on leading technology companies and non-profits." Lindzon provided funding support for growth of the company in 2011.

UsingMiles is a Techstars graduate startup that aims to make it easier for travelers to aggregate their loyalty program rewards in one place.

When Klout was looking for investors in 2011, Lindzon was one of the people interested.

BillGuard watches and alerts users when credit card hidden fees, scams or billing errors are present in their accounts. This project, still only a beta version, was supported by Lindzon in 2009.

GoInstant was acquired by Salesforce.com in July 2012 for US$70 million.

In 2012, Lindzon provided part of the $2M in funding to DailyWorth as well as serving as an advisor.

Lindzon's interest in making data available lead to his support of Plexus Engine, doing business as Little Bird. Little Bird has been automating the process of finding and verifying research sources, making "lists, then aggregate the blog URLs, Twitter handles, and content published" by researchers. Plexus Engine was selected to participate in the Portland Incubator Experiment in 2012.

Lindzon has been involved in funding many other start-ups including but not limited to: Foodzie, Life360, Simply Measured, Clarity, Lucky Sort, Seamless Receipts, Scopely, Colingo, Unbounce, LaunchRock, SendHub, Retrofit, Betable, Dekko, YieldBot, Embedly, New Hive, Buddy Media, Videolicious, Laffster, YCharts, Fanium, BlogTalkRadio, StationCreator, Skyscraper, TubeMogul, MyTrade, MaxMyInterest, Zentact.

In 2013, Lindzon presented at AMP Capital’s Amplify Festival for angel investors in Australia.
