= Garnet Bailey =

Canadian ice hockey player (1948–2001)

- Bailey in 1978
- Born: June 13, 1948 Lloydminster, Saskatchewan, Canada
- Died: September 11, 2001 (aged 53) New York City, U.S.
- Height: 5 ft 11 in (180 cm)
- Weight: 180 lb (82 kg; 12 st 12 lb)
- Position: Left wing
- Shot: Left
- Played for: Boston Bruins; Detroit Red Wings; St. Louis Blues; Washington Capitals; Edmonton Oilers
- NHL draft: 13th overall, 1966; Boston Bruins
- Playing career: 1968–1979

Garnet Edward "Ace" Bailey (June 13, 1948 – September 11, 2001) was a Canadian professional ice hockey player and scout who was a member of Stanley Cup and Memorial Cup-winning teams. He died at the age of 53 while aboard United Airlines Flight 175, which was deliberately crashed into the South Tower of the World Trade Center in New York City during the September 11 attacks.

== Hockey Career ==
Garnet Edward Bailey was born on June 13, 1948, in Lloydminster, Saskatchewan, Canada, a border city straddling the provinces of Saskatchewan and Alberta.

Bailey had a successful junior hockey career with the Edmonton Oil Kings, winning the Memorial Cup in 1966. After recording a 93 point year during the 1966–67 season he was selected by the Boston Bruins in the 1966 amateur draft.

Bailey then spent two seasons with the Bruins' minor league affiliate teams. During the 1968-69 season, he helped lead the Hershey Bears to the Calder Cup, leading the American Hockey League (AHL) in assists during the postseason with 10. He also made eight appearances for the Boston Bruins throughout the season. During one of these appearances on March 16, 1969 he scored a hat trick along with 1 assist in a Bruins 11-3 victory.

The following year, he played 58 games for the 1969–70 Bruins team that won the Stanley Cup. Bailey broke his ankle in a game against the Philadelphia Flyers on March 7, 1970; not appearing in any postseason games resulted in him not getting his name engraved on the trophy.

However, during the 1971–72 season, he appeared in 73 games for the Bruins. During the postseason, he broke a 5-5 tie with the game winning goal at 17:44 of the third period to give the Bruins a victory in Game 1 of the 1972 Stanley Cup Final versus the New York Rangers. Bailey and the Bruins went on to win the Stanley Cup.

In 1972–73, Bailey was dealt to the Detroit Red Wings, and after playing two seasons for them was traded to the St. Louis Blues.

Bailey spent his final four seasons with the Washington Capitals, posting his best statistical season during the 1974-75 season split between St. Louis and Washington, during which he scored 19 goals and 39 assists. After his time in Washington, he played one year in World Hockey Association. He then moved to the Central Hockey League as a player-assistant coach for the Houston Apollos for the 1979-80 season. The following year he was named head coach of the Wichita Thunder prior to the start of the 1980-81 season, and during that season he also played his final professional game.

After two seasons coaching, he was named a pro scout for the Edmonton Oilers, and held the position until the 1993-94 season. Bailey earned five Stanley Cup rings, but his name was only engraved on the trophy once, alongside the 1989-90 team due to limits on the number of names that could be engraved on the Cup in each of those years.

At the time of his death, Bailey was the Los Angeles Kings' director of pro scouting a position he held since 1994. Former Kings general Manager Dave Taylor, said "Bailey had a gift for measuring the intangibles that a player could "bring to the table."

== Death and legacy ==
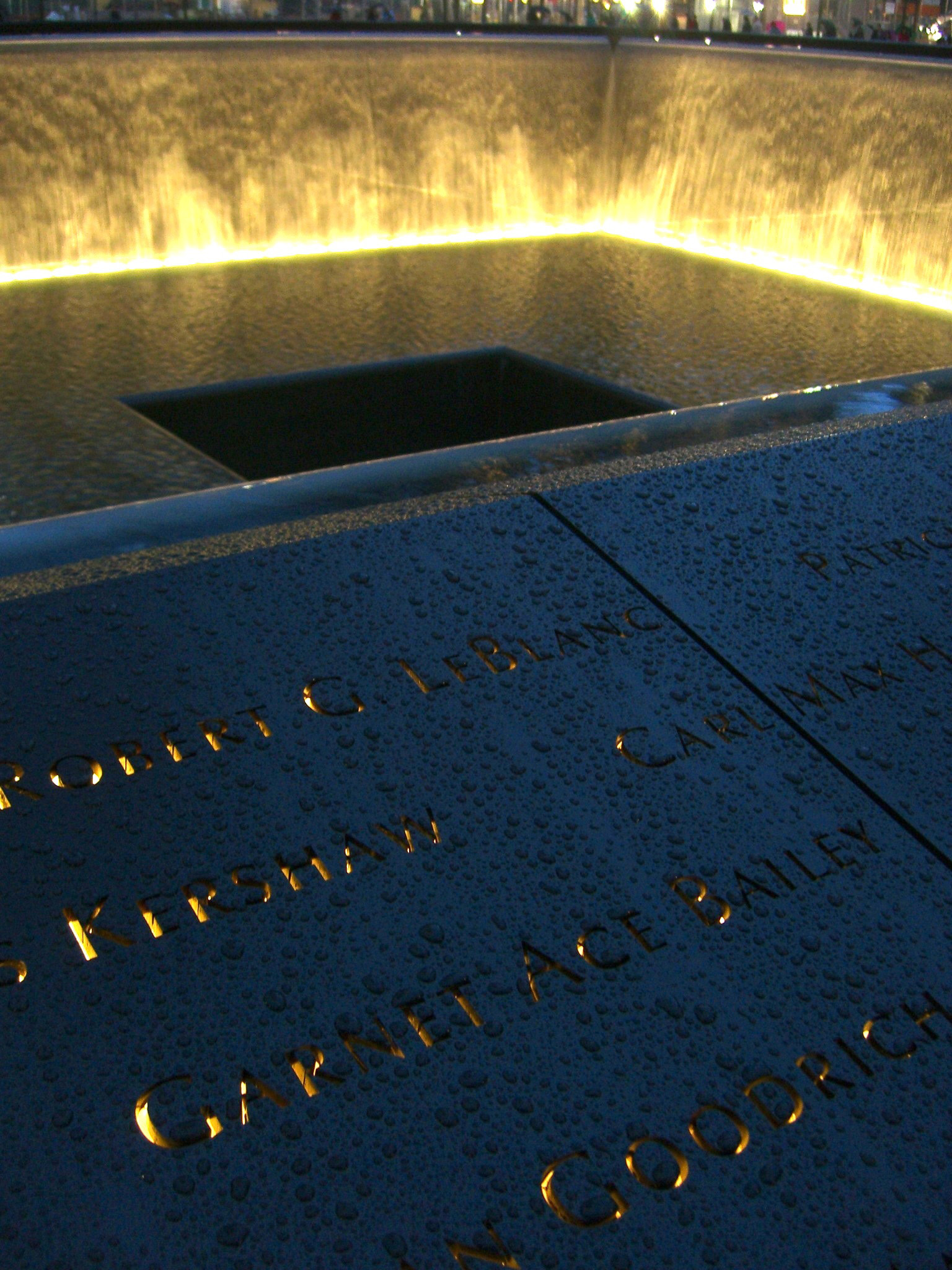
Bailey's name is located on Panel S-3 of the National September 11 Memorial's South Pool, along with those of other passengers of Flight 175.

Bailey died when the plane in which he was travelling, United Airlines Flight 175, was hijacked and deliberately crashed into the South Tower of the World Trade Center in New York City during the September 11 attacks. Airphone records indicate that he attempted to call his wife four times. Bailey and amateur scout Mark Bavis were travelling from Boston to Los Angeles when the flight was hijacked. They had been in Manchester, New Hampshire, visiting the Los Angeles Kings' AHL affiliate, the Manchester Monarchs. Neither of their remains were ever recovered.

Bailey and Bavis are mentioned in the Boston-based Dropkick Murphys song "Your Spirit's Alive." Denis Leary wore a Bailey memorial T-shirt as the character Tommy Gavin in the season 1 episode "Immortal" and the fourth-season episode "Pussified" of the TV series Rescue Me. In his memory, the Los Angeles Kings named their new mascot "Bailey".

Bailey's family founded the Ace Bailey Children's Foundation in his memory. The foundation raises funds to benefit hospitalized children, infants and their families.

At the National September 11 Memorial, Bailey and Bavis are memorialized at the South Pool, on Panel S-3. On October 14, 2012, the Kings brought the Stanley Cup, which the team had just won in June, to the memorial and placed it on panels featuring Bailey and Bavis's names so that the families of Bailey and Bavis could "[have] their day with the Stanley Cup", continuing a hockey tradition whereby players and personnel of the reigning Cup champion team each get a personal day with the trophy.

During the 2001–02 season, the Kings wore special "AM" patches on their jerseys to honor Bailey and Bavis.

In 2023, he was named one of the top 100 Bruins players of all time.

== Career statistics ==
=== Regular season and playoffs ===
			Regular season					Playoffs
Season	Team	League	GP	G	A	Pts	PIM	GP	G	A	Pts	PIM
1966–67	Edmonton Oil Kings	CMJHL	56	47	46	93	177	—	—	—	—	—
1967–68	Oklahoma City Blazers	CHL	34	8	13	21	67	7	0	5	5	36
1968–69	Hershey Bears	AHL	60	24	32	56	104	9	4	10	14	10
1968–69	Boston Bruins	NHL	8	3	3	6	10	1	0	0	0	2
1969–70	Boston Bruins	NHL	58	11	11	22	82	—	—	—	—	—
1970–71	Oklahoma City Blazers	CHL	11	3	8	11	28	—	—	—	—	—
1970–71	Boston Bruins	NHL	36	0	6	6	44	1	0	0	0	10
1971–72	Boston Bruins	NHL	73	9	13	22	64	13	2	4	6	16
1972–73	Boston Bruins	NHL	57	8	13	21	89	—	—	—	—	—
1972–73	Detroit Red Wings	NHL	13	2	11	13	16	—	—	—	—	—
1973–74	Detroit Red Wings	NHL	45	9	14	23	33	—	—	—	—	—
1973–74	St. Louis Blues	NHL	22	7	3	10	20	—	—	—	—	—
1974–75	St. Louis Blues	NHL	49	15	26	41	113	—	—	—	—	—
1974–75	Washington Capitals	NHL	22	4	13	17	8	—	—	—	—	—
1975–76	Washington Capitals	NHL	67	13	19	32	75	—	—	—	—	—
1976–77	Washington Capitals	NHL	78	19	27	46	51	—	—	—	—	—
1977–78	Washington Capitals	NHL	40	7	12	19	28	—	—	—	—	—
1978–79	Edmonton Oilers	WHA	38	5	4	9	22	2	0	0	0	4
1979–80	Houston Apollos	CHL	7	1	0	1	0	—	—	—	—	—
1980–81	Wichita Wind	CHL	1	0	0	0	2	—	—	—	—	—
NHL totals			568	107	171	278	633	15	2	4	6	28
WHA totals			38	5	4	9	22	2	0	0	0	4

- Source: NHL.com

== Personal life ==
Bailey was not related to Hockey Hall of Famer Irvine Wallace "Ace" Bailey. However Bailey also used the Ace nickname throughout his career which he obtained during his youth.

Bailey was married to his wife Katherine. Together, they had a son named Todd. They resided in Lynnfield, Massachusetts. He enjoyed cooking.

== Awards and achievements ==
- Stanley Cup Champion: as a Boston Bruins player in 1970 and 1972, and as an Edmonton Oilers scout in 1984, 1985, 1987, 1988 and 1990.
- Memorial Cup Champion 1966
- Named One of Top 100 Best Bruins Players of all Time.
