= List of Rescue Me episodes =

The following is a list of episodes from the FX series Rescue Me. Broadcast from 2004 to 2011, the series aired 93 episodes over seven seasons, plus 11 additional mini-episodes.

== Series overview ==
Season	Episodes	Originally aired	
Season	Episodes	First aired	Last aired
1	13	July 21, 2004	October 13, 2004
2	13	June 21, 2005	September 13, 2005
3	13	May 30, 2006	August 29, 2006
4	13	June 13, 2007	September 12, 2007
Minisodes	10	June 24, 2008	August 26, 2008
5	22	April 7, 2009	September 1, 2009
6	10	June 29, 2010	August 31, 2010
7	9	July 13, 2011	September 7, 2011

== Episodes ==
=== Season 1 (2004) ===
No. overall	No. in season	Title	Directed by	Written by	Original release date	US viewers (millions)
1	1	"Guts"	Peter Tolan	Denis Leary & Peter Tolan	July 21, 2004	4.1
New York City Firefighter Tommy Gavin wrestles with personal demons as he's visited by the ghost of his deceased cousin who died at the World Trade Center on 9/11, as the rest of his Harlem fire company, Ladder 62, deal with their own issues resulting from 9/11. Tommy and his wife Janet have separated and live across the street from each other. The firehouse gets a new Probationary Firefighter (Probie) named Mike.
2	2	"Gay"	John Fortenberry	Peter Tolan & Denis Leary	July 28, 2004	3.5
The FDNY is affected by a retired fireman's revelation that he's actually homosexual.
3	3	"Kansas"	John Fortenberry	Denis Leary & Peter Tolan	August 4, 2004	N/A
Jerry faces harsh punishment for beating up a homosexual former firefighter, while Tommy suffers the consequences of harassing Janet's new boyfriend.
4	4	"DNA"	Jace Alexander	Story by : John Scurti; Teleplay by : Peter Tolan & Denis Leary	August 11, 2004	N/A
Franco is accused of getting an old girlfriend pregnant while Tommy receives bad news of his own at the site of a local car accident.
5	5	"Orphans"	Jace Alexander	Salvatore Stabile	August 18, 2004	N/A
Franco considers single parenthood while Tommy considers staying out of Janet's way.
6	6	"Revenge"	Adam Bernstein	Michael Caleo	August 25, 2004	N/A
Tommy has Roger arrested for assault and Franco abducts Keela from an abusive foster home.
7	7	"Butterfly"	Adam Bernstein	Robert Krausz	September 1, 2004	N/A
Tommy sees a therapist about his issues with his strained relationship with Janet, and the guys build him a deck. Franco and Sean pose for the Annual Firefighter Calendar.
8	8	"Inches"	John Fortenberry	Stephen Belber	September 8, 2004	N/A
As the fire department holds a contest to determine the best-endowed fireman, a 9/11 widow of a firefighter fantasizes about Tommy. A member of the firehouse, Firefighter Billy Warren, is killed in the line of duty at a fire.
9	9	"Alarm"	John Fortenberry	Salvatore Stabile	September 15, 2004	N/A
Tommy learns that a female firefighter will be joining the firehouse just as he's planning to avenge Billy's death.
10	10	"Immortal"	Jace Alexander	Peter Tolan & Denis Leary	September 22, 2004	N/A
Tommy struggles to keep his affair with Sheila a secret from Jimmy's ghost and fulfill his financial obligations to Janet.
11	11	"Mom"	Jace Alexander	Denis Leary & Peter Tolan	September 29, 2004	N/A
Tommy's mother passes away, leaving him with the responsibility of caring for his unstable father.
12	12	"Leaving"	Peter Tolan	Peter Tolan & Denis Leary	October 6, 2004	N/A
Tommy discovers that Janet's been lying to him when she asks for more money and Sean tries to make peace with Laura again.
13	13	"Sanctuary"	Peter Tolan	Peter Tolan & Denis Leary	October 13, 2004	N/A
Tommy's affair with Sheila is exposed just before a game of hockey between the fire department and the police while Jerry learns about his wife's sickness.

=== Season 2 (2005) ===
No. overall	No. in season	Title	Directed by	Written by	Original release date	US viewers (millions)
14	1	"Voicemail"	Jace Alexander	Denis Leary & Peter Tolan	June 21, 2005	N/A
Tommy is sent to a firehouse on Staten Island due to his responsibility for Franco's injuries, so he tries getting back into 62 Truck.
15	2	"Harmony"	Jace Alexander	Peter Tolan & Denis Leary	June 28, 2005	N/A
Tommy joins a fireman's barbershop quartet to track down his estranged family.
16	3	"Balls"	John Fortenberry	Denis Leary & Peter Tolan	July 5, 2005	N/A
Chief Perrolli agrees to take Tommy back, but only if all the firefighters of 62 Truck want him back, which is very problematic.
17	4	"Twat"	John Fortenberry	Peter Tolan & Denis Leary	July 12, 2005	N/A
Tommy returns to 62 Truck while Laura files a complaint against Lou.
18	5	"Sensitivity"	Peter Tolan	Denis Leary & Peter Tolan	July 19, 2005	N/A
While Chief Perrolli makes sure that Tommy stays clean, the Gavin brothers discover their father's secret family.
19	6	"Reunion"	Peter Tolan	Peter Tolan & Denis Leary	July 26, 2005	N/A
Tommy learns the truth about Sheila's pregnancy and Sean discovers that the woman he's dating is a firebug.
20	7	"Shame"	Jace Alexander	Evan Reilly	August 2, 2005	2.05
Tommy leaves the kids with his father so he can find a place to live and a new supply of drugs.
21	8	"Believe"	Jace Alexander	Evan Reilly	August 9, 2005	N/A
Jerry is forced to face his feelings for his gay son at a party and Tommy's efforts to hide his kids fall apart. Franco and Garrity are at odds after Laura snaps at Garrity.
22	9	"Rebirth"	Jeffrey Levy	Denis Leary & Peter Tolan	August 16, 2005	N/A
Tommy feels like a new man when he steals Janet's antidepressants.
23	10	"Brains"	Jeffrey Levy	Mike Martineau	August 23, 2005	N/A
Tommy and Mickey find proof that their half-brother is actually a child molester.
24	11	"Bitch"	John Fortenberry	John Scurti	August 30, 2005	N/A
Tommy is tasked with talking his nephew out of being a firefighter since they are afraid for his life.
25	12	"Happy"	John Fortenberry	Denis Leary & Peter Tolan & Evan Reilly	September 6, 2005	N/A
Tommy's estranged sister Maggie, whom he hadn't seen in years, comes home upon learning that their father will leave them a fortune, planning to keep all the money for herself.
26	13	"Justice"	Peter Tolan	Peter Tolan & Denis Leary	September 13, 2005	3.6
Since Janet blames him for their son's death, Tommy enlists his father and uncle Teddy to plan his revenge against the man who killed his son.

A 15-minute episode was produced between the second and third seasons, and released to several websites and cable providers as a promotion for season three. It was released on the third season DVD set as an extra. It is commonly listed under various names online, including "Rescue Me 2.5", "Special Presentation", "Courageous Men" and "Comedy Short".

Title	Writer (s)	Director	Original airdate	#
"Phobia" (aka "Heroes")	Peter Tolan and Denis Leary	unknown	2006-05-08	--
Late at night, during the middle of a double shift, the crew has encounters with an animal inside the firehouse.

=== Season 3 (2006) ===
No. overall	No. in season	Title	Directed by	Written by	Original release date
27	1	"Devil"	Peter Tolan	Denis Leary and Peter Tolan	May 30, 2006
Tommy deals with new problems in his life: Janet is divorcing him, he can't stop drinking or smoking, his father needs him and his uncle is in trouble with the law.
28	2	"Discovery"	Peter Tolan	Peter Tolan and Denis Leary	June 6, 2006
Sean and Johnny try to keep troubling secrets from Tommy that could make his life worse than it already is..
29	3	"Torture"	Jace Alexander	Evan Reilly	June 13, 2006
Tommy is still angry with Janet for being with his brother, but he soon faces the consequences of getting Nell Turbody to end her affair with his nephew.
30	4	"Sparks"	Jace Alexander	Denis Leary and Peter Tolan	June 20, 2006
Tommy knows that Sean is in a relationship with his sister, and when an argument sparks between Tommy and Janet during a discussion around their settlement, Tommy rapes Janet.
31	5	"Chlamydia"	John Fortenberry	Evan Reilly	June 27, 2006
Tommy wants his former sister-in-law to help him get revenge on Johnny and Janet while Franco discovers his girlfriend just kidnapped his daughter.
32	6	"Zombies"	John Fortenberry	Peter Tolan and Denis Leary	July 11, 2006
Tommy and Johnny's ex-wife conspire to make him and Janet jealous while Sean takes an overdose of sleeping pills, causing him to walk in his sleep.
33	7	"Satisfaction"	Ken Girotti	Denis Leary and Peter Tolan	July 18, 2006
Tommy deals with another survivor's guilt just as Sheila is plotting revenge on him for cheating on her with Angie.
34	8	"Karate"	Ken Girotti	Evan Reilly	July 25, 2006
Sean proposes to Maggie, Lou tries Yoga and Tommy dates Sheila, Angie and Janet all at once.
35	9	"Pieces"	Jace Alexander	Peter Tolan and Denis Leary	August 1, 2006
Tommy learns that the firefighters of 62 Truck are moving on, making him more concerned about his safety.
36	10	"Retards"	Jace Alexander	Evan Reilly	August 8, 2006
Sheila gets a Cadillac for Tommy to get him to marry her, Franco's attempt to impress Natalie falls flat and Mike's gay affair affects his transfer.
37	11	"Twilight"	John Fortenberry	John Scurti	August 15, 2006
While Tommy struggles to handle the pressure of caring for his father, Lou confesses that he once dated a nun and Jerry looks for help in sexual activity.
38	12	"Hell"	Peter Tolan	Denis Leary and Peter Tolan	August 22, 2006
Tommy, his friends and family embrace a big change when Johnny's murder coincides with Jerry's near-fatal heart attack.
39	13	"Beached"	Peter Tolan	Peter Tolan and Denis Leary	August 29, 2006
After Johnny's funeral, Tommy wonders how he'll be able to care for his family and keep his promise to Sheila that he'll retire and live with her.

=== Season 4 (2007) ===
No. overall	No. in season	Title	Directed by	Written by	Original release date	US viewers (millions)
40	1	"Babyface"	Peter Tolan	Denis Leary & Peter Tolan	June 13, 2007	2.79
As Tommy becomes the prime suspect in an arson investigation, Janet is worried her new baby doesn't like her and Sean tries to deal with Maggie's porn collection she kept.
41	2	"Tuesday"	Jace Alexander	Peter Tolan & Denis Leary	June 20, 2007	2.52
While Tommy tries to get Sheila to come up with a believable story to end the arson investigation, he and Janet suspect that Colleen ran away from home.
42	3	"Commitment"	Jace Alexander	Evan Reilly	June 27, 2007	2.22
As Tommy fails to convince Colleen to come back home, Jerry tries to deal with being forced from a firefighter into a desk job since he is not fit to be a firefighter.
43	4	"Pussified"	Jace Alexander	Denis Leary & Peter Tolan	July 11, 2007	2.34
While Tommy tries to make peace with Janet, Mike attempts to cope with his mother's death and Sean threatens to divorce Maggie, hurting her feelings.
44	5	"Black"	Jace Alexander	Mike Martineau	July 18, 2007	2.03
With Teddy in rehab for his overdosing, Lou finds recruits for the station's basketball team and Tommy learns that Sheila may have lied about the beach house fire.
45	6	"Balance"	Don Scardino	Evan Reilly	July 25, 2007	N/A
Sean tries to find out a secret that Mike's hiding in his deceased mother's bedroom and Tommy tries to figure out a deal Lou made with a rookie in 62 truck.
46	7	"Seven"	Don Scardino	Peter Tolan & Denis Leary	August 1, 2007	2.16
In spite of their heroic efforts for the fire, the firefighters of 62 Truck are heavily criticized and mocked by the press for failing to save seven children from a tragic house fire, making their lives more miserable than ever.
47	8	"Solo"	Ken Girotti	Denis Leary & Peter Tolan & Evan Reilly	August 8, 2007	2.54
As Janet walks out on Tommy for giving the baby to Sheila, Chief Feinberg pressures him to take his daughter Beth on a date.
48	9	"Animal"	Ken Girotti	Evan Reilly	August 15, 2007	N/A
After trying to help Maggie and Uncle Teddy, Tommy struggles to get his life together when Janet throws him out of the house.
49	10	"High"	John Fortenberry	Peter Tolan & Denis Leary	August 22, 2007	N/A
After bribing Colleen to see the baby and find out what Janet's up to, Tommy looks back on his childhood while conversing with his estranged father.
50	11	"Cycle"	John Fortenberry	John Scurti	August 29, 2007	N/A
Tommy tries to kick his drinking habit out while keeping respective promises to Colleen and Sheila.
51	12	"Keefe"	Jace Alexander	Denis Leary & Peter Tolan & Evan Reilly	September 5, 2007	N/A
While wearing his cousin's bunker jacket, Tommy secretly protects Mike from the mistakes of his new hard-drinking crew.
52	13	"Yaz"	Jace Alexander	Peter Tolan & Denis Leary & Evan Reilly	September 12, 2007	N/A
Tommy decides to fix his many failed relationships when Jimmy's ghost puts the firehouse on its very edge.

=== Minisodes (2008) ===
A series of 10 five-minute shorts were released in 2008 to bridge the gap between seasons 4 and 5. In addition to airing on FX, the shorts were made available on various video websites, including Hulu and Crackle.

Title	Writer (s)	Director	Original air date	#
"Fast"	Peter Tolan, Denis Leary, and Evan Reilly	John Fortenberry	2008-06-24	01
Sean struggles to uphold his fast in the face of adversity in the form of Lou's homemade doughnuts.
"Fantasy"	Peter Tolan, Denis Leary, and Evan Reilly	John Fortenberry	2008-07-01	02
Tommy's dream takes a turn for the worse, delighting his bunkmates.
"Criteria"	Peter Tolan, Denis Leary, and Evan Reilly	John Fortenberry	2008-07-08	03
It's a battle of the bottle, or the broads, when Tommy and the guys debate their standards on what makes a good bar, while the guys focus on the beauties behind the bar.
"Juiced"	Peter Tolan, Denis Leary, Evan Reilly, and John Scurti	John Fortenberry	2008-07-15	04
The crew debates the finer points of baseball and ... juice (This episode is revealed to take place the morning of September 11, 2001).
"Spelling"	Peter Tolan, Denis Leary, and Evan Reilly	John Fortenberry	2008-07-22	05
Lou bets that Mike will fail to spell the most obvious of words.
"Supreme"	Peter Tolan, Denis Leary, and Evan Reilly	John Fortenberry	2008-07-29	06
Tommy's dreams and nightmares follow him everywhere. When he steps out for a night in old New York, the women catch his eye, but past regrets and fiery demons catch his mind.
"Sandwich"	Peter Tolan, Denis Leary, and Evan Reilly	John Fortenberry	2008-08-05	07
When Lou's lunch goes missing, the guys have some explaining to do.
"Clue"	Peter Tolan, Denis Leary, and Evan Reilly	Peter Tolan	2008-08-12	08
As fires flare up around them, the guys play a game to keep their minds off the painful task at hand.
"Sweat"	Peter Tolan, Denis Leary, and Evan Reilly	John Fortenberry	2008-08-19	09
Tommy and the boys emerge from a blaze looking to cool off, only to find an empty cooler and Siletti bathing in hydrant water. But soon music starts, and grown men start begging.
"Smoke"	Peter Tolan, Denis Leary, and Evan Reilly	John Fortenberry	2008-08-26	10
It's another day at the office for Tommy and the men of 62 Truck. There's fire, burning buildings, people to save, and ladders to pull. It's a job well done, but there's more on the way.

=== Season 5 (2009) ===
No. overall	No. in season	Title	Directed by	Written by	Original release date	US viewers (millions)
53	1	"Baptism"	Peter Tolan	Evan Reilly	April 7, 2009	2.30
As Tommy attends a hearing that will determine his future as a firefighter, Mike is talked into buying a bar and black Shawn is revealed to be dating Colleen, upsetting Tommy. In 2009, TV Guide ranked this episode #96 on its list of the 100 Greatest Episodes.
54	2	"French"	Peter Tolan	Denis Leary & Peter Tolan	April 14, 2009	N/A
As a French author comes to New York to write a book about 9/11, Tommy discovers a secret about Janet's new guy and Mike and his friends prepare to open their bar.
55	3	"Wine"	John Fortenberry	Peter Tolan & Denis Leary	April 21, 2009	1.54
While Tommy plans to sabotage Black Shawn's attempts to marry Colleen, Lou starts a romance with the French author who's writing the book about 9/11.
56	4	"Jimmy"	John Fortenberry	Evan Reilly	April 28, 2009	N/A
After looking closely at video footage from 9/11, Tommy comes to suspect that Jimmy may have survived the attack on the World Trade Center, being alive all these years.
57	5	"Sheila"	Constantine Makris	Denis Leary & Evan Reilly	May 5, 2009	N/A
As Tommy learns about Katy moving to boarding school, Garrity gets bad news about his health and Sheila asks Mike to help Damien prepare for firefighting training.
58	6	"Perspective"	Constantine Makris	Peter Tolan & Denis Leary	May 12, 2009	N/A
While Garrity tries to keep his cancer a secret, Tommy finally reveals his feelings about 9/11 and Franco's views have serious consequences. At the firehouse, needles comes down hard on the guys after they are attacked by several others.
59	7	"Play"	Peter Tolan	Denis Leary & Peter Tolan	May 19, 2009	N/A
Tommy and Janet visit Katy in Rhode Island where they try, for once, to have a normal regular family weekend instead of bickering all the time.
60	8	"Iceman"	Peter Tolan	Denis Leary & Evan Reilly	May 26, 2009	N/A
While Tommy's drinking brings him face to face with the ghosts of his past, Damien rides along on with 62 Truck, but becomes trapped in a burning building after being led in by Mike.
61	9	"Thaw"	Peter Markle	Denis Leary & Evan Reilly	June 2, 2009	N/A
After rescuing Damien, Tommy discovers that he's desired by both Sheila and Janet.
62	10	"Control"	Rosemary Rodriguez	Story by : Denis Leary & Peter Tolan & Evan Reilly; Teleplay by : Mike Martineau	June 9, 2009	N/A
While Tommy's friends find out about his drinking, Sean's battle with cancer is made more difficult when his mother and brother visit. Tommy and Mike are trapped in the basement of a burning building after a fallen safe blocks their exit.
63	11	"Mickey"	Peter Tolan	Story by : Danielle Giovanniello; Teleplay by : Peter Tolan & Denis Leary	June 16, 2009	N/A
As Sean makes final preparations for surgery, Colleen talks Tommy into getting revenge on Black Shawn for making rude comments.
64	12	"Disease"	John Fortenberry	Evan Reilly	June 23, 2009	N/A
While Sean recovers in the hospital, Lou is tempted by his ex-girlfriend and Tommy realizes his kids know more about his drinking than he thought.
65	13	"Torch"	John Fortenberry	Peter Tolan & Denis Leary	June 30, 2009	N/A
As Sean struggles to recover from his cancer surgery, Tommy has a bad reaction to a gruesome car accident.
66	14	"Wheels"	Rosemary Rodriguez	Evan Reilly	July 7, 2009	N/A
Just as Franco's boxing ring becomes a big hit, the firefighters ask Damien to tell him that the female boxer he's fallen for is actually a lesbian.
67	15	"Initiation"	Rosemary Rodriguez	Denis Leary & Peter Tolan	July 14, 2009	N/A
While Sean returns to the firehouse following his surgery, Tommy finds it difficult to keep his promise to keep an eye on 62 Truck's new probie.
68	16	"Clean"	Constantine Makris	Denis Leary & Evan Reilly	July 21, 2009	N/A
After bad publicity is brought on by a brawl he starts at a fireman's memorial service, Tommy is tasked with keeping the firehouse clean.
69	17	"Lesbos"	Ken Girotti	Peter Tolan & Denis Leary	July 28, 2009	1.18
When a benefit for Garrity ends with a brawl that pits firefighters against lesbians, Tommy has to choose between Janet, his wife, and Sheila, his girlfriend.
70	18	"Carrot"	Ken Girotti	Denis Leary & Evan Reilly	August 4, 2009	1.24
As Tommy tries to decide between Janet and Sheila, Needles and Lou arrange for Franco to face a lesbian in the boxing ring.
71	19	"David"	John Fortenberry	Denis Leary & Evan Reilly	August 11, 2009	N/A
While Tommy protects Damien from a sexually-aggressive older woman, Lou admits to having second thoughts about making Tommy his best man. the two have a brawl after Lou tells Tommy he does not want him to come to the wedding.
72	20	"Zippo"	John Fortenberry	Denis Leary & Evan Reilly	August 18, 2009	N/A
As Tommy works to prevent Damien from getting involved with the older woman who's fallen for him, he still has to choose between Janet and Sheila.
73	21	"Jump"	Peter Tolan	Peter Tolan & Denis Leary & Evan Reilly	August 25, 2009	1.46
While Tommy and Kelly share common personal tragedies, Lou hopes to settle everything with his larcenous wife, only for tragedy to strike his family yet again.
74	22	"Drink"	Peter Tolan	Denis Leary & Peter Tolan	September 1, 2009	1.78
Janet and Sheila conspire to sabotage Tommy's latest romance as Teddy's struggle with Ellie's death threatens more suffering to 62 Truck.

=== Season 6 (2010) ===
No. overall	No. in season	Title	Directed by	Written by	Original release date	US viewers (millions)
75	1	"Legacy"	Peter Tolan	Denis Leary & Peter Tolan	June 29, 2010	1.90
After Uncle Teddy shoots him, Tommy comes back from the dead to a world that's trying to stop him from drinking again.
76	2	"Change"	Peter Tolan	Denis Leary & Evan Reilly	July 6, 2010	N/A
Tommy tries to regain a position of influence in his family when he learns his friends have assumed his familial duties.
77	3	"Comeback"	Constantine Makris	Evan Reilly	July 13, 2010	1.27
Tommy faces a difficult graveyard shift upon returning to work while trying to stay sober and away from his multiple drinking habits.
78	4	"Breakout"	Constantine Makris	Evan Reilly	July 20, 2010	1.06
Needles and Tommy conspire to get Lou out of the hospital when a rival firehouse intends to take advantage of his condition for their own causes.
79	5	"Blackout"	Peter Tolan	Peter Tolan & Denis Leary	July 27, 2010	1.26
Tommy has to find Colleen after a wild night he can't remember.
80	6	"Sanctuary"	Valerie Harrington	Denis Leary & Evan Reilly	August 3, 2010	1.16
Tommy attempts to get Colleen off drinking, which leads him to face demons from his past.
81	7	"Forgiven"	John Fortenberry	Denis Leary & Evan Reilly	August 10, 2010	1.41
Tommy goes back to work when Colleen drops the assault charges against him - only to find 62 Truck shut down. Later, Needles and Feinberg have a falling out as Needles has always supported the men he commands. Later, the crew responds in their own vehicles to a fire at a school for deaf children and prove their worth. this leads to 62 Truck and 99 Engine being reopened.
82	8	"Cowboy"	John Fortenberry	Peter Tolan & Denis Leary	August 17, 2010	1.19
While 62 Truck gets a new lease on life for a publicized rescue, Janet agrees to give Tommy one more chance - on the condition that he end his affair with Sheila.
83	9	"Goodbye"	John Fortenberry	Denis Leary & Evan Reilly	August 24, 2010	1.18
As Tommy vows to get his life back together, Lou continues to ignore his failing health and Damien struggles with his decision to quit the fire department. he later suffers a traumatic injury and is no longer able to walk or communicate.
84	10	"A.D.D."	Peter Tolan	Denis Leary & Peter Tolan	August 31, 2010	1.60
While Tommy pays attention to Damien, the firefighters express their anger at the site chosen to commemorate a fallen comrade.

=== Season 7 (2011) ===
No. overall	No. in season	Title	Directed by	Written by	Original release date	US viewers (millions)
85	1	"Mutha"	Peter Tolan	Denis Leary & Evan Reilly	July 13, 2011	1.64
Sheila bonds with Janet over her pregnancy, Tommy discovers Colleen working at the bar owned by Mickey and Uncle Teddy.
86	2	"Menses"	John Fortenberry	Peter Tolan & Denis Leary & Evan Reilly	July 20, 2011	1.36
Tommy discovers that the women in his life are plotting against him as the crew goes through three long, quiet weeks at work.
87	3	"Press"	John Fortenberry	Denis Leary & Evan Reilly & Zach Robbins	July 27, 2011	1.55
As Tommy tries to avoid being interviewed on TV about his cousin Jimmy, Black Shawn seeks help in scaling back Colleen's wedding plans.
88	4	"Brownies"	Ken Girotti	Denis Leary & Evan Reilly & Zach Robbins	August 3, 2011	1.24
Tommy goes on TV to talk about his cousin Jimmy Keefe. Everything seems fine at first but then the reporter asks personal questions. This sends Tommy into an expletive laced rant and obscene gestures on the TV. A violent brawl ensues after Franco puts the blame on both Tommy and Needles about the interview and Franco considers leaving the house before his own life gets tainted.
89	5	"Head"	Ken Girotti	Denis Leary & Evan Reilly	August 10, 2011	1.17
As Tommy faces suspension and more bad press after his interview, his fellow firefighters start a campaign to save him from his miserable fate.
90	6	"344"	Ken Girotti	Denis Leary & Evan Reilly	August 17, 2011	1.39
Tommy gets in trouble with his family for making an unconscious violation of Sheila's privacy and Lou challenges Franco to do a better job of running 62 Truck.
91	7	"Jeter"	Ken Girotti	Denis Leary & Evan Reilly	August 24, 2011	1.11
To help Tommy make things right with his family, Lou gives them letters Tommy wrote for them to read after his death.
92	8	"Vows"	Evan Reilly	Peter Tolan & Denis Leary & Evan Reilly	August 31, 2011	1.32
According to Gavin family tradition, Colleen's wedding proves to be an emotional, if not debaucherous affair, but everyone's high spirits are soon broken when the crew fights one of the biggest fires of their lives.
93	9	"Ashes"	Peter Tolan	Denis Leary & Peter Tolan	September 7, 2011	2.33
The members of 62 Truck struggle to pick up the pieces in the aftermath of the fire and the death of Lou, as the new probies stand before a new leader, Franco Rivera. This is the Series Finale.
