= Tempt (band) =

American rock band from New York City

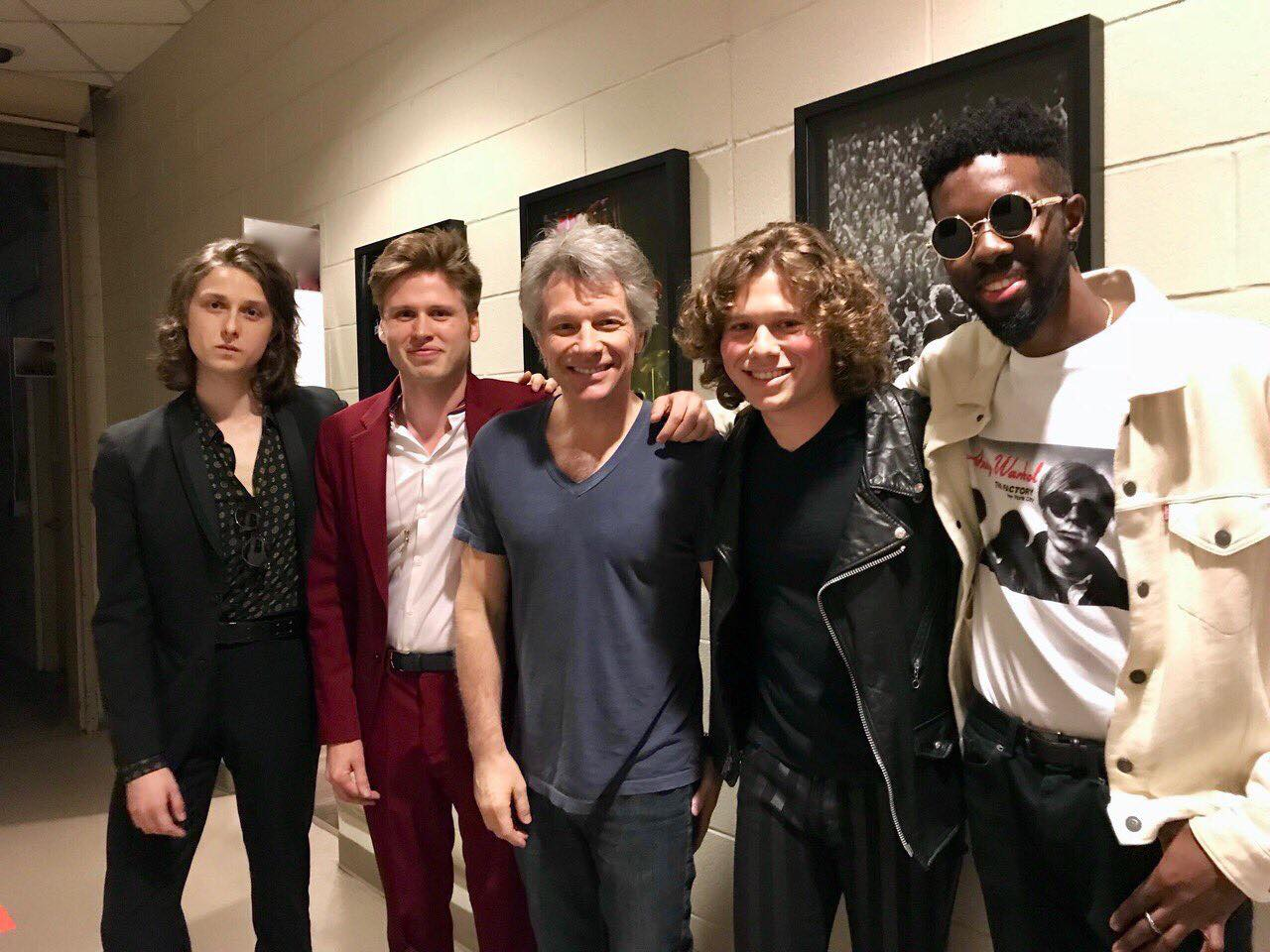
- Tempt backstage with Jon Bon Jovi at Madison Square Garden in 2018

Background information
- Origin: New York, NY, U.S.
- Genres: Rock; Hard rock; Power Pop
- Years active: 2016–present
- Labels: Rock Candy Records; Better Noise Music
- Members: Zach Allen; Harrison Marcello; Nick Burrows; Chris Gooden
- Website: www.temptband.com

Tempt is an American rock band formed in New York City in 2016. Its members are: Zach Allen (Lead Vocals), Harrison Marcello (Guitars), Nicholas Burrows (Drums) and Chris Gooden (Bass). Their music is described as a mix of power pop, melodic metal, and classic rock.

== Career ==
Tempt entered a licensing-and-distribution agreement with Rock Candy Records founder Derek Oliver and released their debut album, "Runaway" in 2016. The album was mixed by multi-platinum engineer and Producer, Michael Wagener and was well received worldwide with many positive reviews. Legendary rock music journalist Malcolm Dome in a review in Classic Rock Magazine said, "Melodic rock has found its new heroes". The band references 70's and 80's rock music as influences including the band Def Leppard and the producer Mutt Lange. Tempt recorded a version of Def Leppard's classic song "Women" and Def Leppard recognized and praised the job that Tempt did by posting Tempt's version on all of their social media.

In 2018, the band was selected by New York radio station WBAB to open for Bon Jovi at the world's most famous arena, Madison Square Garden. As a result of this performance, the band was then invited to perform five more shows with Bon Jovi on the "Bon Jovi Runaway To Paradise Cruise".

In 2019, Malcolm Dome sent a live video of the band performing the song Living Dangerous to renowned managers Andy Gould (Linkin Park, Pantera, Rob Zombie) and Steve Strange (Coldplay, Last In Line, Vivian Campbell) who immediately signed the band to a management contract. They then recorded a new record that was co-produced by Grammy Award winner Chris Lord-Alge. This led to Allen Kovac, CEO of Better Noise Music signing the band to a multi-album deal. Their first release on Better Noise Music was the single, "Hot Summer Dreams" on the compilation, Endless Summer.

The band has toured with Bon Jovi, Collective Soul, Shinedown, Iron Maiden, Tremonti, Theory Of A Deadman, The Dead Daisies and Starz.

Tempt's first major festival appearances were in the United States at Rocklahoma, Aftershock and Louder Than Life where they opened for Metallica. This was followed by a successful tour of major European music festivals.

On August 25, 2023, after a delay due to the Covid-19 pandemic, Tempt's self-titled album was released on Better Noise Music. The album received rave reviews in the rock press including publications such as Classic Rock, Louder, Fireworks Rock and Metal Magazine, Screamer, My Global Mind and dozens of rock zines, websites and video channels. It was featured on multiple Spotify, Apple Music, and Tidal editorial playlists. It entered the top 100 on Billboard Magazine Heatseekers Chart and Classic Rock top reviewed albums of 2023.

=== Runaway Album - 2016 ===
Allen and Marcello composed all of the material for Runaway while they were still in university. Allen was studying at University of Miami, Frost School of Music while Marcello was studying classical composition at The Boston Conservatory. The album was recorded in The United States at Guilford Sound in southern Vermont and produced by Tag Gross former partner of Nile Rodgers and Billy Straus best known for his work with Broadway composer, David Yazbek. The band used studio musicians Sterling Campbell who was a member of Duran Duran, David Bowie and The B-52s on drums and Jack Daley who was a member of Lenny Kravitz's band on bass. The basic tracks for 14 songs were recorded over two days. Three songs, Dirty One, Love Terminator and Time Won't Heal were co-written by Jack Ponti who is a songwriter, label executive, artist manager (India Arie) and former partner of Jon Bon Jovi. Additional recording was then done in New York City at Sticky Audio Labs. The band then engaged multi-platinum engineer Michael Wagener (Skid Row, Dokken, Alice Cooper) to mix the album. Wagener commented on the project, "As I was mixing the album, I couldn't make up my mind which song would be the single because they're all very well-written and performed. Great band, great songs, great performances." The band shot a music video for the track, Under My Skin.

=== European Tour - 2022 ===
During the summer of 2022, Tempt did an extensive and well received European tour performing at major rock festivals such as Download Festival, Rock Am Ring, Rock Im Park, Graspop Metal Meeting and the mainstage at Hellfest. In addition, the band performed direct support slots for Iron Maiden, Shinedown, Tremonti, Theory of a Deadman and Airbourne. The tour included multiple shows in England, Scotland, Ireland, Germany, Belgium, France, Denmark and Belgium.

=== The Retaliators Movie Soundtrack - 2022 ===
In 2022, Tempt's song "Living Dangerous" was released on the soundtrack for the film, The Retaliators. The track features a guest vocal performance by Dorothy Martin from American rock band, Dorothy. The video for the song features the band performing live with Dorothy in front of footage from the film projected on industrial silos including Tommy Lee, Michael Lombardi, Mark Menchaca, and Joseph Gatt. The video was shot on location in the Hunt's Point section of the Bronx, NY.

=== Christmas Single Release - 2022 ===
In December 2022, the band released the single, Christmas Is The Time To Say I Love You which was composed by Billy Squier. The accompanying video was a celebration of the post-pandemic Christmas spirit of New York City featuring many famous landmarks such as Radio City Music Hall, Rockefeller Center, Saks Fifth Avenue, Hudson Yards and The Plaza.

=== We Will Rock You and Collaboration with Queen's Sir Brian May - 2023 ===
On January 17, 2023, the band released a cover version of the classic Queen song, We Will Rock You. The arrangement is of the so-called "fast version" of the song. Queen's lead guitarist, Sir Brian May heard Tempt's version of the song and featured it on his social media and his website. The band then decided to donate all proceeds from the release to Sir Brian's Save Me Trust. In order to increase donations and to raise the visibility of The Save Me Trust, the band initiated a social media campaign that features guitar players and other instrumentalists performing the solo break. This has included guitarists such as Phil X, Al Di Meola, Adam Slack from The Struts, Andy Timmons, Joel Hoekstra and Vernon Reid. A video in support of the song featuring live concert footage from their European tour was also released. The footage used for the video came from the social media posts of fans in attendance at the concerts.

=== Debut Album On Better Noise Music - 2023 ===
Tempt released the original songs, Roses on May 19, 2023, and Burn Me Down on July 5, leading up to the release of their self-titled debut on Better Noise Music.

== Personal ==
Guitarist, Harrison Marcello is the godson of rock star, Billy Squier and late guitarist, Jeff Golub. He appears in a photograph taken by his mother, Laura McDonald on the cover of Squier's album "Happy Blue" and is the subject of Squier's song "Two". He was bequeathed Golub's iconic pink ESP guitar which can be seen in Rod Stewart's concert video, One Night Only Live At Royal Albert Hall. His brother Max McDonald is the son of King Crimson founder, Ian McDonald. Marcello was a finalist in a Rolling Stone Magazine competition to find 'the next great young guitarist'.

Drummer, Nicholas Burrows is the son of Jeff Burrows, a member of the Canadian rock trio, The Tea Party.

== Discography ==
Albums

- TEMPT (Self-titled album - Better Noise Music, 2023)
- Runaway (Album - Rock Candy Records, 2016)

Singles

- "We Will Rock You" (Single - Better Noise Music, 2023)
- "Christmas Is The Time To Say I Love You" (Single - Better Noise Music, 2022)
- "Living Dangerous" featuring Dorothy (Single - Better Noise Music and Retaliators soundtrack, 2022)
- "Hot Summer Dreams" (Single - Better Noise Music, Endless Summer Compilation, 2019)

EPs

- Under My Skin (Limited Edition EP - Sticky Audio Labs, 2016)

== Music Videos ==
Title	Year	Director
"Two Ways"	2024	Eric Steinhauser
"Camouflage"	2024	Daniel Marracino
"Golden Tongue"	2023	John Trumbull
"Burn Me Down	2023	Daniel Marracino
"Roses"	2023	Eric Steinhauser
"We Will Rock You"	2023	John Trumbull
"Christmas Is The Time To Say I Love You"	2022	Daniel Marracino
"Living Dangerous"	2021	Eric Steinhauser
"Hot Summer Dreams"	2019	Jean Hill
"Under My Skin"	2018	Eric Steinhauser
