= Lost City Angels =

American punk rock band

- Origin: Boston, Massachusetts, USA
- Genres: Punk rock
- Years active: 2001 – 2007; 2008 (reunion show)
- Labels: Nitro Records; Stay Gold Records
- Past members: Ron Ragona; Adam Shaw; Chris Duggan; Drew Indingaro; Scott Vierra; Nick Bacon; Mike Pellegrino; Chris Sweeney

Lost City Angels were a punk rock band from Boston, Massachusetts. Their most well-known line-up consisted of members, Ron Ragona, Adam Shaw, Chris Duggan, Drew Indingaro and Nick Bacon.

== Overview ==
Lost City Angels were founded in 2001 by Adam Shaw, Chris Duggan and guitarist Drew Indingaro. The original line-up was completed when former Bruisers guitarist, Scott Vierra, and former Spring Heeled Jack vocalist/guitarist joined soon after. Following a year or so of touring, Vierra decided to move on and Ragona's fellow Spring Heeled Jack bandmate, Mike Pellegrino stepped in to play guitar.

The band played in clubs along the North East United States, landing a hometown support slot for Australia's The Living End at the Paradise Rock Club. The members of The Living End were so impressed by The Lost City Angels, that they contacted their agent and insisted that the band support them for the remainder of their United States tour. Pellegrino left the band soon after and former Pilfers guitarist, Nick Bacon, was brought in as the band's guitarist. A stint on the Vans Warped Tour and an opening slot on a Social Distortion tour would soon follow.

These support slots and reviews of their live show attracted the attention of The Offspring vocalist Dexter Holland, who would sign The Lost City Angels to his Nitro Records. The band recorded with former The Mighty Mighty Bosstones member Nate Albert for a 2002 self-titled release on Nitro Records.

After continuous touring in support of their self-titled release with bands such as Social Distortion, Flogging Molly, Andrew W.K., Allister, Further Seems Forever, Dynamite Boy, The Mighty Mighty Bosstones and The Living End, Lost City Angels signed a recording contract with Stay Gold Records, an imprint of Universal Records.

They would return to the studio in 2004 to record their second album Broken World that was released on April 5, 2005. The record received reviews from Alternative Press (5 out of 5), Playboy (4 out of 4), Revolver (3.5 out of 4).

== Line-up changes ==
In April 2006, Ragona and Bacon departed the band and were replaced by Chris Sweeney, formerly of The Dead Pets, on vocals and a new lead guitarist known only as Mr. X. They continued to tour in support of the Broken World album, opening for bands such as Social Distortion. Demo tracks were recorded for a third album but the band seemed to unceremoniously break up in 2007 and a result, the album was never completed.

On February 14, 2008, the line-up of Indingaro, Ragona, Bacon, Shaw & Duggan reunited for a reunion show at The Middle East in Cambridge, Massachusetts.

On December 28, 2014, Lost City Angels opened for Andrew W.K and the Mighty Mighty Bosstones for the 17th Hometown Throwdown at the House of Blues.

Ragona began playing with a new band named The Murder Mile and after several reunion shows with Spring Heeled Jack, reformed the band. Bacon returned to working with Pilfers while also playing with Die Kinder and Apache Stone. Besides starting his own band, Nick and the Adversaries, Bacon also joined the reunited Spring Heeled Jack as a keyboard player. Bacon has also done some minor acting work, appearing in "Music and Lyrics" as well as with Apache Stone in the Rescue Me television series. Drew Indingaro formed the short-lived New Alibis and Cradle To The Grave, and is currently playing in Diablogato, formed in 2015. Duggan went on to form Boston rock super group (with members of The New Alibis) The Men, and he also became a master Mason. Shaw continued in the field of music management and manages Oceanside CA's indie rock band The Drowning Men and was the tour manager of The Mighty Mighty Bosstones.

== Members ==
- Ron Ragona- vocals, guitar
- Drew Indingaro - guitar
- Duggan D - bass
- Adam Shaw - drums
- Nick Bacon - guitar
- Scott Vierra - guitar
- Mike Pellegrino - guitar
- Chris Sweeney - vocals

== Discography ==
=== Albums ===
- Lost City Angels (2002)
- Broken World (2004)
