= Satellite Award for Best Actor – Television Series Drama =

Annual television award

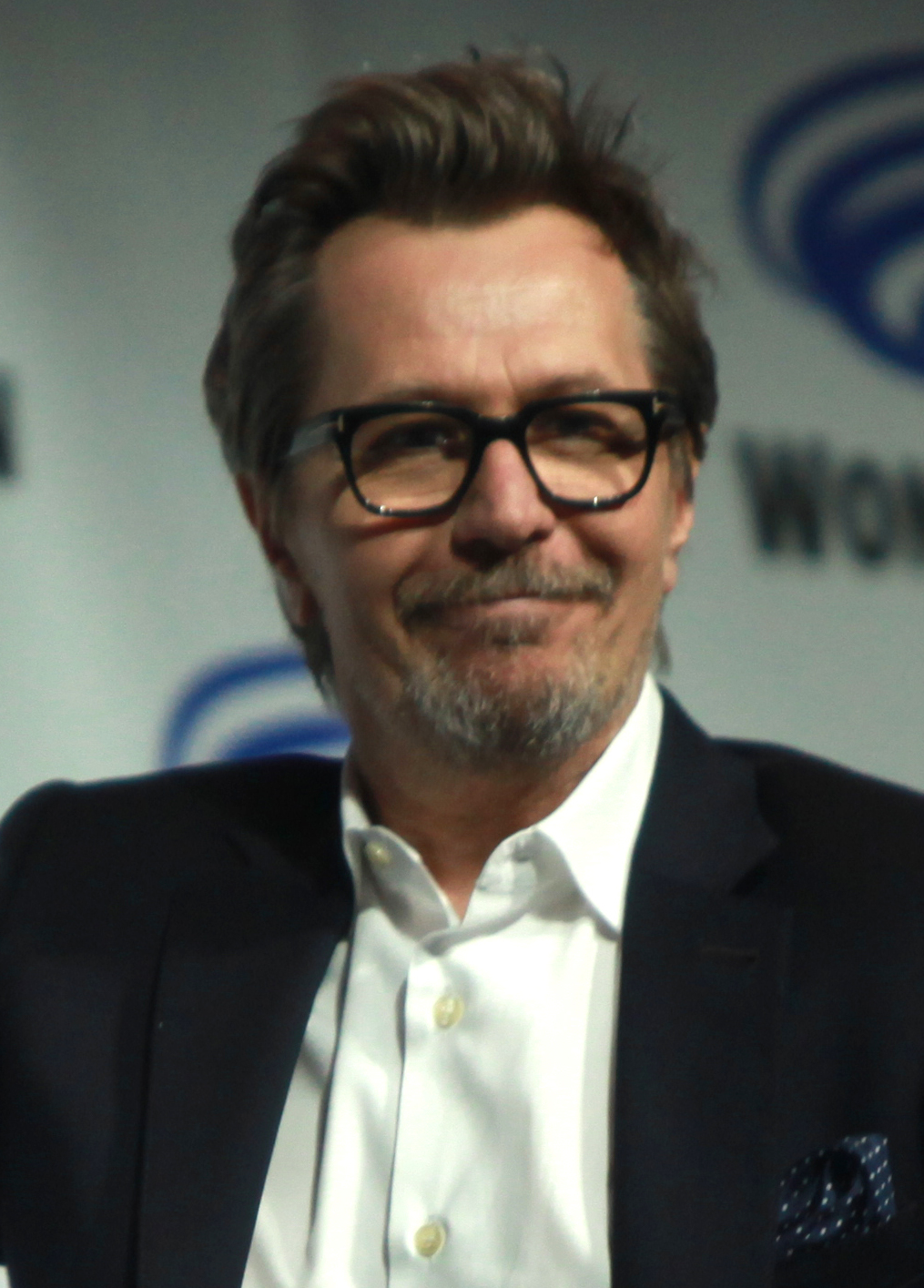
- The 2023 recipient: Gary Oldman
- Awarded for: Best Actor in a Drama Series
- Country: United States
- Presented by: International Press Academy
- First award: 1996
- Currently held by: Gary Oldman – Slow Horses (2023)

The Satellite Award for Best Actor in a Television Series – Drama is one of the annual awards given by the International Press Academy.

== Winners and nominees ==
=== 1990s ===
Year	Actor	Series	Role	Network
1996	David Duchovny	The X-Files	Fox Mulder	Fox
1996	Dennis Franz	NYPD Blue	Andy Sipowicz	ABC
1996	Andre Braugher	Homicide: Life on the Street	Frank Pembleton	NBC
1996	Anthony Edwards	ER	Dr. Mark Greene	NBC
1996	Hector Elizondo	Chicago Hope	Phillip Watters	CBS
1997	Jimmy Smits	NYPD Blue	Bobby Simone	ABC
1997	David Duchovny	The X-Files	Fox Mulder	Fox
1997	Dennis Franz	NYPD Blue	Andy Sipowicz	ABC
1997	Sam Waterston	Law & Order	Jack McCoy	NBC
1997	Michael T. Weiss	The Pretender	Jarod	NBC
1998	Ernie Hudson	Oz	Leo Glynn	HBO
1998	George Clooney	ER	Dr. Doug Ross	NBC
1998	Michael T. Weiss	The Pretender	Jarod	NBC
1998	Jimmy Smits	NYPD Blue	Bobby Simone	ABC
1998	Dylan McDermott	The Practice	Bobby Donnell	ABC
1999	Martin Sheen	The West Wing	Josiah Bartlet	NBC
1999	James Gandolfini	The Sopranos	Tony Soprano	HBO
1999	Eamonn Walker	Oz	Kareem Saïd	HBO
1999	Dylan McDermott	The Practice	Bobby Donnell	ABC
1999	Sam Waterston	Law & Order	Jack McCoy	NBC

=== 2000s ===
Year	Actor	Series	Role	Network
2000	Tim Daly	The Fugitive	Dr. Richard Kimble	CBS
2000	James Gandolfini	The Sopranos	Tony Soprano	HBO
2000	Dennis Haysbert	Now and Again	Dr. Theodore Morris	CBS
2000	Nicky Katt	Boston Public	Harry Senate	Fox
2000	Martin Sheen	The West Wing	Josiah Bartlet	NBC
2001	Kiefer Sutherland	24	Jack Bauer	Fox
2001	James Gandolfini	The Sopranos	Tony Soprano	HBO
2001	Craig T. Nelson	The District	Jack Mannion	CBS
2001	William Petersen	CSI: Crime Scene Investigation	Gil Grissom	CBS
2001	Martin Sheen	The West Wing	Josiah Bartlet	NBC
2002	Kiefer Sutherland	24	Jack Bauer	Fox
2002	Michael Chiklis	The Shield	Vic Mackey	FX
2002	Peter Krause	Six Feet Under	Nate Fisher	HBO
2002	Chi McBride	Boston Public	Steven Harper	Fox
2002	Martin Sheen	The West Wing	Josiah Bartlet	NBC
2003	Michael Chiklis	The Shield	Vic Mackey	FX
2003	David Boreanaz	Angel	Angel	The WB
2003	Anthony LaPaglia	Without a Trace	Jack Malone	CBS
2003	Julian McMahon	Nip/Tuck	Dr. Christian Troy	FX
2003	David Paymer	Line of Fire	Jonah Malloy	ABC
2003	Nick Stahl	Carnivàle	Ben Hawkins	HBO
2004	Matthew Fox	Lost	Dr. Jack Shephard	ABC
2004	Vincent D'Onofrio	Law & Order: Criminal Intent	Robert Goren	NBC
2004	Anthony LaPaglia	Without a Trace	Jack Malone	CBS
2004	James Spader	Boston Legal	Alan Shore	ABC
2004	Treat Williams	Everwood	Andrew Brown	The WB
2005	Hugh Laurie	House	Dr. Gregory House	Fox
2005	Denis Leary	Rescue Me	Tommy Gavin	FX
2005	Dylan Walsh	Nip/Tuck	Dr. Sean McNamara	FX
2005	Ian McShane	Deadwood	Al Swearengen	HBO
2005	Jake Weber	Medium	Joe Dubois	NBC
2006	Hugh Laurie	House	Dr. Gregory House	Fox
2006	Michael C. Hall	Dexter	Dexter Morgan	Showtime
2006	Denis Leary	Rescue Me	Tommy Gavin	FX
2006	Bill Paxton	Big Love	Bill Henrickson	HBO
2006	Matthew Perry	Studio 60 on the Sunset Strip	Matt Albie	NBC
2006	Bradley Whitford	Studio 60 on the Sunset Strip	Danny Tripp	NBC
2007	Michael C. Hall	Dexter	Dexter Morgan	Showtime
2007	Denis Leary	Rescue Me	Tommy Gavin	FX
2007	Eddie Izzard	The Ri¢hes	Wayne Malloy	FX
2007	Hugh Laurie	House	Dr. Gregory House	Fox
2007	Bill Paxton	Big Love	Bill Henrickson	HBO
2007	James Woods	Shark	Sebastian Stark	CBS
2008	Bryan Cranston	Breaking Bad	Walter White	AMC
2008	Gabriel Byrne	In Treatment	Dr. Paul Weston	HBO
2008	Michael C. Hall	Dexter	Dexter Morgan	Showtime
2008	Jason Isaacs	Brotherhood	Michael Caffee	Showtime
2008	Jon Hamm	Mad Men	Don Draper	AMC
2008	David Tennant	Doctor Who	The Doctor	BBC One
2009	Bryan Cranston	Breaking Bad	Walter White	AMC
2009	Bill Paxton	Big Love	Bill Henrickson	HBO
2009	Gabriel Byrne	In Treatment	Dr. Paul Weston	HBO
2009	Lucian Msamati	The No. 1 Ladies' Detective Agency	Mr. J.L.B. Matekoni	HBO
2009	Nathan Fillion	Castle	Richard Castle	ABC
2009	Jon Hamm	Mad Men	Don Draper	AMC

=== 2010s ===
Year	Actor	Series	Role	Network
2010	Bryan Cranston	Breaking Bad	Walter White	AMC
2010	Kyle Chandler	Friday Night Lights	Eric Taylor	DirecTV
2010	Josh Charles	The Good Wife	Will Gardner	CBS
2010	Michael C. Hall	Dexter	Dexter Morgan	Showtime
2010	Jon Hamm	Mad Men	Don Draper	AMC
2010	Stephen Moyer	True Blood	Bill Compton	HBO
2011	Timothy Olyphant	Justified	Raylan Givens	FX
2011	Steve Buscemi	Boardwalk Empire	Enoch "Nucky" Thompson	HBO
2011	Wendell Pierce	Treme	Antoine Batiste	HBO
2011	Kyle Chandler	Friday Night Lights	Eric Taylor	DirecTV
2011	Bryan Cranston	Breaking Bad	Walter White	AMC
2011	William H. Macy	Shameless	Frank Gallagher	Showtime
2012	Damian Lewis	Homeland	Nicholas Brody	Showtime
2012	Jon Hamm	Mad Men	Don Draper	AMC
2012	Bryan Cranston	Breaking Bad	Walter White	AMC
2012	Jeff Daniels	The Newsroom	Will McAvoy	HBO
2012	Jonny Lee Miller	Elementary	Sherlock Holmes	CBS
2012	Timothy Olyphant	Justified	Raylan Givens	FX
2013	Bryan Cranston	Breaking Bad	Walter White	AMC
2013	Jeff Daniels	The Newsroom	Will McAvoy	HBO
2013	Jon Hamm	Mad Men	Don Draper	AMC
2013	Freddie Highmore	Bates Motel	Norman Bates	A&E
2013	Derek Jacobi	Last Tango in Halifax	Alan Buttershaw	BBC One
2013	Michael Sheen	Masters of Sex	Dr. William Masters	Showtime
2013	Kevin Spacey	House of Cards	Frank Underwood	Netflix
2013	Aden Young	Rectify	Daniel Holden	SundanceTV
2014	Clive Owen	The Knick	Dr. John "Thack" Thackery	Cinemax
2014	Martin Freeman	Fargo	Lester Nygaard	FX
2014	Billy Bob Thornton	Fargo	Lorne Malvo	FX
2014	Charlie Hunnam	Sons of Anarchy	Jackson "Jax" Teller	FX
2014	Woody Harrelson	True Detective	Detective Martin "Marty" Hart	HBO
2014	Mads Mikkelsen	Hannibal	Dr. Hannibal Lecter	NBC
2014	Lee Pace	Halt and Catch Fire	Joe MacMillan	AMC
2014	Michael Sheen	Masters of Sex	Dr. William Masters	Showtime
2015	Dominic West	The Affair	Noah Solloway	Showtime
2015	Kyle Chandler	Bloodline	John Rayburn	Netflix
2015	Timothy Hutton	American Crime	Russ Skokie	ABC
2015	Liev Schreiber	Ray Donovan	Ray Donovan	Showtime
2015	Rami Malek	Mr. Robot	Elliot Alderson	USA Network
2015	Bob Odenkirk	Better Call Saul	Jimmy McGill / Saul Goodman / Gene Takavic	AMC
2016	Dominic West	The Affair	Noah Solloway	Showtime
2016	Rami Malek	Mr. Robot	Elliot Alderson	USA Network
2016	Bob Odenkirk	Better Call Saul	Jimmy McGill / Saul Goodman / Gene Takavic	AMC
2016	Matthew Rhys	The Americans	Philip Jennings	FX
2016	Liev Schreiber	Ray Donovan	Ray Donovan	Showtime
2016	Billy Bob Thornton	Goliath	Billy McBride	Prime Video
2017	Jonathan Groff	Mindhunter	Holden Ford	Netflix
2017	Brendan Gleeson	Mr. Mercedes	Detective Bill Hodges	Audience
2017	Harry Treadaway	Mr. Mercedes	Brady Hartsfield	Audience
2017	Ewan McGregor	Fargo	Emmit and Ray Stussy	FX
2017	Tom Hardy	Taboo	James Keziah Delaney	FX
2017	Sam Heughan	Outlander	Jamie Fraser	Starz
2018	Brendan Gleeson	Mr. Mercedes	Bill Hodges	Audience
2018	Jason Bateman	Ozark	Marty Byrde	Netflix
2018	Bob Odenkirk	Better Call Saul	Jimmy McGill / Saul Goodman / Gene Takavic	AMC
2018	Matthew Rhys	The Americans	Philip Jennings	FX
2018	J. K. Simmons	Counterpart	Howard Silk	Starz
2018	Billy Bob Thornton	Goliath	Billy McBride	Prime Video
2019	Tobias Menzies	The Crown	Prince Philip, Duke of Edinburgh	Netflix
2019	Brian Cox	Succession	Logan Roy	HBO
2019	Brendan Gleeson	Mr. Mercedes	Bill Hodges	Audience
2019	Jonathan Groff	Mindhunter	Holden Ford	Netflix
2019	Damian Lewis	Billions	Robert "Bobby" Axelrod	Showtime
2019	Billy Bob Thornton	Goliath	Billy McBride	Prime Video

=== 2020s ===
Year	Actor	Series	Role	Network
2020	Bob Odenkirk	Better Call Saul	Jimmy McGill / Saul Goodman / Gene Takavic	AMC
2020	Jason Bateman	Ozark	Marty Byrde	Netflix
2020	Damian Lewis	Billions	Robert "Bobby" Axelrod	Showtime
2020	Tobias Menzies	The Crown	Prince Philip, Duke of Edinburgh	Netflix
2020	Regé-Jean Page	Bridgerton	Simon Basset	Netflix
2020	Matthew Rhys	Perry Mason	Perry Mason	HBO
2021	Omar Sy	Lupin	Assane Diop	Netflix
2021	Brian Cox	Succession	Logan Roy	HBO
2021	Aldis Hodge	City on a Hill	Assistant District Attorney DeCourcy Ward	Showtime
2021	James Nesbitt	Bloodlands	Detective Chief Inspector Tom Brannick	Acorn TV
2021	Jeremy Strong	Succession	Kendall Roy	HBO
2021	Titus Welliver	Bosch	Harry Bosch	Prime Video
2022	Bob Odenkirk	Better Call Saul	Jimmy McGill / Saul Goodman / Gene Takavic	AMC
2022	Shaun Evans	Endeavour	Endeavour Morse	PBS
2022	John C. Reilly	Winning Time: The Rise of the Lakers Dynasty	Jerry Buss	HBO
2022	Adam Scott	Severance	Mark Scout	Apple TV+
2022	J. K. Simmons	Night Sky	Franklin York	Prime Video
2022	Jeremy Allen White	The Bear	Carmen "Carmy" Berzatto	FX on Hulu
2023	Gary Oldman	Slow Horses	Jackson Lamb	Apple TV+
2023	Brian Cox	Succession	Logan Roy	HBO
2023	Harrison Ford	1923	Jacob Dutton	Paramount+
2023	Pedro Pascal	The Last of Us	Joel Miller	HBO
2023	Jeremy Strong	Succession	Kendall Roy	HBO
