= Bob Krause =

Bob Krause may refer to:

- Bob Krause (athletic director) (1945–2015), American academic administrator
- Bob Krause (politician) (born 1950), American politician in Iowa

== See also ==
- Robert Kraus (1925–2001), American author, cartoonist and publisher
- Robert Kraus (footballer), Austrian footballer
- Robert Krausz (1936–2002), Israeli commodities trader
