= Evan Reilly =

- Other names: Evan T. Reilly
- Occupations: Television writer, producer, director
- Known for: Rescue Me; The Walking Dead

Evan Reilly, sometimes credited as Evan T. Reilly, is an American television writer, producer and director who is best known as a long-time writer and producer on the FX series Rescue Me, which he worked on beginning with its second season and continuing through to its seventh and final season. During this time he wrote or co-wrote forty-three episodes and made his directorial-debut on the penultimate episode, "Vows". He is currently serving as a co-executive producer on the AMC horror/drama series The Walking Dead. He has worked on the production team on a number of other series, including Law and Order: Criminal Intent, Heist and The Sopranos.

== Rescue Me (43 episodes) ==
- 2.07 - "Shame"
- 2.08 - "Believe"
- 2.25 - "Happy" (co-written with Denis Leary and Peter Tolan)
- 3.03 - "Torture"
- 3.05 - "Chlamydia"
- 3.08 - "Karate"
- 3.10 - "Retards"
- 4.03 - "Commitment"
- 4.06 - "Balance"
- 4.08 - "Solo" (co-written with Denis Leary and Peter Tolan)
- 4.09 - "Anger"
- 4.12 - "Keefe" (co-written with Denis Leary and Peter Tolan)
- 4.13 - "Yaz" (co-written with Denis Leary and Peter Tolan)
- Minisodes (co-written with Denis Leary and Peter Tolan)
  - "Fast"
  - "Fantasy"
  - "Criteria"
  - "Juiced"
  - "Spelling"
  - "Supreme"
  - "Sandwich"
  - "Clue"
  - "Sweat"
  - "Smoke"
- 5.01 - "Baptism"
- 5.04 - "Jimmy"
- 5.05 - "Sheila" (co-written with Denis Leary)
- 5.08 - "Iceman" (co-written with Denis Leary)
- 5.09 - "Thaw" (co-written with Denis Leary)
- 5.10 - "Control" (story co-written with Denis Leary and Peter Tolan, teleplay by Mike Martineau)
- 5.12 - "Disease"
- 5.14 - "Wheels"
- 5.16 - "Clean" (co-written with Denis Leary)
- 5.18 - "Carrot" (co-written with Denis Leary)
- 5.19 - "David" (co-written with Denis Leary)
- 5.20 - "Zippo" (co-written with Denis Leary)
- 5.21 - "Jump" (co-written with Denis Leary and Peter Tolan)
- 6.02 - "Change" (co-written with Denis Leary)
- 6.03 - "Comeback"
- 6.04 - "Breakout"
- 6.06 - "Sanctuary" (co-written with Denis Leary)
- 6.07 - "Forgiven" (co-written with Denis Leary)
- 6.09 - "Goodbye" (co-written with Denis Leary)
- 7.01 - "Mutha" (co-written with Denis Leary)
- 7.02 - "Menses" (co-written with Denis Leary and Peter Tolan)
- 7.03 - "Press" (co-written with Denis Leary and Zach Robbins)
- 7.04 - "Brownies" (co-written with Denis Leary and Zach Robbins)
- 7.05 - "Head" (co-written with Denis Leary)
- 7.06 - "344" (co-written with Denis Leary)
- 7.07 - "Jeter" (co-written with Denis Leary)
- 7.08 - "Vows" (also director; co-written with Denis Leary and Peter Tolan)

== Heist (1 episode) ==
- 1.03 “Strife” (co-written with Mark Cullen & Robb Cullen)

== The Walking Dead (6 episodes) ==
- 2.04 - "Cherokee Rose"
- 2.08 - "Nebraska"
- 2.12 - "Better Angels" (co-written with Glen Mazzara)
- 3.03 - "Walk With Me"
- 3.09 - "The Suicide King"
- 3.14 - "Prey" (co-written with Glen Mazzara)

== Ballers (14 episodes) ==
- 1.02 "Raise Up"
- 1.03 "Move the Chains"
- 1.06 "Everything Is Everything"
- 1.08 "Gaslighting"
- 1.09 "Flamingos" (co-written with Stephen Levinson)
- 2.01 "Face of the Franchise"
- 2.02 "Enter the Temple"
- 2.05 "Most Guys"
- 2.09 "Million Bucks in a Bag" (co-written with Steve Sharlet)
- 2.10 "Game Day"
- 3.02 "Belly Rush"
- 3.05 "Make Believe"
- 3.09 "Crackback" (co-written with Steve Sharlet)
- 3.10 "Yay Area"

== Sex, Drugs & Rock & Roll (3 episodes) ==
- 1.06 "Tattoo You"
- 2.09 "Rolling in the Deep"
- 2.10 "Bang Bang"

== Happy! (1 episode) ==
- 2.02 "Tallahassee"
