= Guess Who Died =

American comedy television pilot by Norman Lear

- Genre: Comedy
- Created by: Norman Lear; Peter Tolan
- Written by: Norman Lear; Peter Tolan
- Directed by: Adam Bernstein
- Starring: Hector Elizondo; Holland Taylor; Beth Lacke; Stacey Yen; Adrian Martinez; Christopher Lloyd
- Country of origin: United States
- Original language: English

Production
- Executive producers: Norman Lear; Peter Tolan; Brent Miller
- Producer: Patricia Fass Palmer
- Camera setup: Single-camera
- Production companies: Act III Productions; The Cloudland Company; Sony Pictures Television

Guess Who Died is an American comedy television pilot created by Norman Lear and Peter Tolan and starring Hector Elizondo, Holland Taylor, Beth Lacke, Stacey Yen, Adrian Martinez, and Christopher Lloyd. The pilot was directed by Adam Bernstein and written by Lear and Tolan, both of whom also executive produced alongside Brent Miller. Commissioned by NBC for the 2018–19 television season, the pilot was ultimately passed over and not picked up to series. Had the production been given a series order, it would have marked Lear's first original sitcom production in over twenty years.

== Premise ==
Guess Who Died follows the residents of "Las Esperanzado Senior Community in Palm Springs. It centers on Murray, a retired music executive who is positive and upbeat with sparkling eyes and a keen, sharp and wonderful sense of humor. After the death of his beloved wife, he realizes he’s fallen in love with his sister-in-law, Patricia, a former American Airlines flight attendant, who can be a little too proper at times, but she’s sharp as a tack with a great sense of humor."

== Cast and characters ==
- Hector Elizondo as Murray
- Holland Taylor as Patricia
- Beth Lacke as Cybil
- Stacey Yen as Lanie
- Adrian Martinez as Lopez
- Christopher Lloyd as Mort

== Episodes ==
No.	Title	Directed by	Written by
1	"Pilot"	Adam Bernstein	Norman Lear & Peter Tolan

== Production ==
=== Development ===
Around 2010, Lear first conceived the idea for series, began to write a pilot script, and started shopping the show among various television networks. In the ensuing years, Lear struggled to find network executives interested in developing the project. On October 31, 2015, Lear held a live table read of the show's pilot episode at the annual Austin Film Festival featuring Robert Walden and June Squibb. While producing the 2017 remake of One Day at a Time with Sony Pictures Television, Lear was introduced to fellow television producer Peter Tolan by the studio. In early 2017, the duo began to actively develop the project together.

On August 22, 2017, it was announced that the series had landed a pilot production commitment from NBC. The show is set to be executive produced by Lear, Tolan, and Brent Miller. Production companies involved include Act III Productions, The Cloudland Company and Sony Pictures Television. On May 11, 2018, it was announced that NBC had passed on the pilot and would not be giving the production a series order. Soon after this announcement, the producers reportedly began to shop the series to other networks and streaming services with YouTube Red showing interest.

On June 11, 2018, Amazon Studios CEO Jennifer Salke mentioned in multiple interviews that Lear had sent her the director's cut of the pilot episode for consideration of a series order for the production on Amazon Video. Salke had previously bought and developed the project during her tenure as NBC Entertainment president. By the end of the month, Amazon was said to still be considering the series. On August 2, 2018, it was reported that Amazon had passed on the pilot and declined to order it to series. Brent Miller, Act II Productions' head of production and development spoke of their future plans for the project, saying, "I'm not done pursuing this world. I think we need a show out there that can accurately represent people living and not 'living' as the stereotype. I came home from Palm Springs and told Norman that these people are living and they're not there to die. I'm thinking we might look at [Guess Who Died] as a film. It'd be really great."

=== Casting ===
On January 17, 2018, it was reported that Hector Elizondo and Holland Taylor had been cast in the lead roles of Murray and Patricia, respectively. On January 30, 2018, it was announced that Beth Lacke and Adrian Martinez had been cast as series regulars in the roles of Cybil and Lopez, respectively. On February 6, 2018, it was reported that Christopher Lloyd had joined the main cast in the role of Mort.

=== Filming ===
Principal photography for the pilot took place from February 27 to March 6, 2018 at the University Village Thousand Oaks senior living community in Thousand Oaks, California.
