= John Scurti =

American actor

- Born: John Martin Scurti; East Northport, New York
- Education: Fordham University
- Occupation: Actor
- Years active: 1993–present

John Martin Scurti is an American actor.

Scurti attended Fordham University, where he received a bachelor's degree in Fine Arts. One of his early major film roles was The Ref in 1994, in which he appeared with Denis Leary. He maintained a friendship with Leary, and in 2004 Leary asked him to play Lt. Ken Shea in the series Rescue Me. Scurti played Shea for all seven seasons of the show, and also contributed as a writer.

Through the 1990s and early 2000s, Scurti worked mainly in television, landing small roles on episodes of shows such as Murphy Brown, Baywatch Nights, Spin City, Sex and the City, The $treet, Law & Order, Ed, and Monk. He appeared in two episodes of Marvel's Luke Cage, and in 2018 played a recurring character in the Netflix series The Good Cop.

== Filmography ==
Film
Year	Title	Role	Notes	Ref
1993	Who's the Man?	Boothby	film debut credited as John Martin Scurti	
1994	The Ref	Steve		
1994	Hand Gun	Security Guard #2	credited as John M. Scurti	
1996	Beautiful Girls	Ticket Agent		
2003	Mona Lisa Smile	Stan Sher		
2003	Crooked Lines	Pizza Boy		
2005	War of the Worlds	Ferry Captain		
2011	Dirty Movie	Sheriff		
2011	Olive	Horace Powell		
2012	The Amazing Spider-Man	Doorman	uncredited	
2013	Mobius	Honey		
2016	As You Are	Detective Erickson		
2017	Off the Rails	Mayo		
2019	Bad Education	Joseph Scalvo		
2019	The Irishman	Bertram B. Beveridge		
Television
Year	Title	Role	Notes	Ref
1994–2008	Law & Order	Judge Anton Vittelli/Bruno Scagnetti/Hoeck	television debut 3 episodes	
1995	Pointman	unknown	Episode: "That's Amore"	
1995	New York News	Jansen	Episode: "The Using Game"	
1996	Murphy Brown	Lodge Owner	Episode: "Trick or Treat"	
1996–1997	Spin City	Reporter/2nd Reporter/First Reporter	recurring role; 4 episodes	
1997	Baywatch Nights	unknown	Episode: "Hot Winds"	
1998	Sex and the City	Chunky Gay Guy	Episode: "The Monogamists"	
2000	The $treet	Robert Blagman	2 episodes	
2001	Law & Order: Criminal Intent	Fred DeLuca	Episode: "Art"	
2002	Ed	Union Guy #2	Episode: "Trust"	
2003	Hope & Faith	John	Episode: "Summary Judgment"	
2004–2011	Rescue Me	Lieutenant Ken "Lou" Shea	Main role; 93 episodes	
2004	Monk	NYC Transit Cop	Episode: "Mr. Monk Takes Manhattan"	
2004	The Jury	Richard Bykstrom	Episode: "Too Jung to Die"	
2005	Law & Order: Special Victims Unit	Police Phone Operator Mudgett	Episode: "Bang & Blame"	
2006	The Book of Daniel	Detective	Episode: "God's Will"	
2008	Rescue Me minisodes	Lieutenant Ken "Lou" Shea	Main role; 10 episodes	
2009	The Unusuals	Vice Detective	Episode: "Pilot"	
2011	House M.D.	Monroe	Episode: "Parents"	
2012	Person of Interest	Bob Sowoski	Episode: "Risk"	
2012	I Just Want My Pants Back	Landlord	Episode: "Safety Nets"	
2012	NYC 22	Lieutenant Jack Rizzi	2 episodes	
2013	Unforgettable	Jack Paulson	Episode: "Bigtime"	
2014	House of Cards	Wes Buchwalter	Episode: "Chapter 15"	
2014–2015	Sirens	Jerry	2 episodes	
2015	Deadbeat	Santa Gary	Episode: "The Ghost of Christmas Presents"	
2016	Blue Bloods	Detective Harold Reed	Episode: "Friends in Need"	
2016, 2018	Luke Cage	Dr. Gabe Krasner	2 episodes	
2017	The Detour	Hockey Coach	Episode: "The Tournament"	
2018	Rise	Superintendent Lewis	2 episodes	
2018	The Good Cop	Wendell Kirk	5 episodes	
2018	Bull	Cesar Caputo	Episode: "Fool Me Twice"	
2018–2023	The Marvelous Mrs. Maisel	Nicky	6 episodes	

=== Writer ===
Year	Title	Notes
2004-2007	Rescue Me	Television series; 4 episodes Episode: "DNA" (2004); Episode: "Bitch" (2005); Episode: "Twilight" (2006); Episode: "Cycle" (2007)
2008	Rescue Me minisodes	Web series; 10 episodes
