= Michael Lombardi (actor) =

American actor (born 1976)

- Born: September 2, 1976 (age 49)
- Occupations: Actor, producer, musician
- Years active: 2000–present

Michael Lombardi (born September 2, 1976) is an American actor, producer, and musician. He is best known for his portrayal of the Probationary (Probie) firefighter Mike Silletti in the critically acclaimed hit television show Rescue Me on FX.

Lombardi was a notable alumni of the William Esper Studio, He made his television debut in an episode of Saturday Night Live in 2000.

Lombardi has appeared in feature films such as the Lionsgate released Last Knights and has acted in TV series such as Blue Bloods (Paramount Global), CSI: Miami (Paramount Global), Castle (The Walt Disney Company) and The Deuce (Warner Bros. Discovery).

Lombardi produced and played the role of Matt in the Better Noise Films indie film Sno babies.

Lombardi is also the Producer and plays the lead character John Bishop in the feature film The Retaliators which had its European premiere at FrightFest Film Festival in the UK and opening Screamfest Horror Film Festival in Hollywood CA.

Lombardi won best actor at the Orlando Film Festival. Lombardi is lead singer for the band Apache Stone.

In 2022, it was announced that Lombardi would star in the comedy film Plan B, alongside Jamie Lee, Jon Heder, Tom Berenger, and Shannon Elizabeth.

== Filmography ==
Film and Television
Year	Title	Role	Notes	Ref
2000	Saturday Night Live	Extra	1 episode	
2000	Contest Searchlight	Self	4 episodes	
2002	The Job (2001 TV series)	Cabana Boy/Manuel	1 episode (Vacation)	
2006	Prescriptions	'Bitter' Mike Banister		
2006	Banshee (TV series)	Oliver Fitzgerald		
2007	Six Degrees (TV series)	Lucas Farrow	1 episode (Get a Room)	
2008	Cayman Went	Josh Anders		
2004–2011	Rescue Me (American TV series)	Mike Silletti	93 episodes	
2014	Castle (TV series)	Tommy Fulton	1 episode (Law & Boarder)	
2016	Blue Bloods	Sal Vinchetti	1 episode (Cursed)	
2012	CSI Miami	Liam Flynn	1 episodes	
2017	The Deuce (TV series)	Eddie	Recurring character	
2020	Papa Roach	Producer	The Ending Music Video	
2020	Sno Babies	Matt	Producer	
2021	The Retaliators	John Bishop	Producer	
