= Finding Amanda =

- Theatrical release poster
- Directed by: Peter Tolan
- Written by: Peter Tolan
- Produced by: Wayne Rice; Richard Heller
- Starring: Brittany Snow; Peter Facinelli; Matthew Broderick; Daniel Roebuck
- Cinematography: Tom Houghton
- Edited by: Paul Anderson
- Music by: Christopher Tying
- Production companies: Capacity Pictures; MJ Films
- Distributed by: Magnolia Pictures
- Release date: June 27, 2008
- Running time: 96 minutes
- Country: United States
- Language: English
- Box office: $77,410

Finding Amanda is a 2008 comedy drama film directed by Peter Tolan and starring Matthew Broderick and Brittany Snow.

The plot revolves around a television producer with a penchant for drinking and gambling, who is sent to Las Vegas to convince his troubled niece to enter rehabilitation.

It was filmed in California over a three-month period.

== Plot ==
Working as a television writer for a low-rated sitcom, Those McAllisters, Taylor Peters has developed a few vices, such as drinking, drug abuse and compulsive gambling, which have previously damaged his career to the extent that he takes sessions with an analyst only to prove to his wife Lorraine that he is seeking treatment.

Adding to Taylor's stressful home life is the discovery that their 20-year-old niece Amanda has run away from home to Las Vegas to work as a prostitute. Although he writes a good comic scene for his lead actor Ed Begley Jr., Taylor still has the need to run off to the track to play the horses. When his wife discovers it and threatens him with divorce, Taylor agrees to go find Amanda and try to get her into a rehab community in Malibu.

Taylor goes to Las Vegas and locates Amanda and realizes that, even though she is involved in a dangerous profession, she has accumulated wealth and retained a relatively refined attitude about life. During the rescue, Taylor's drinking and drug addiction returns and his relationship with his wife crumbles, but he learns a large lesson about life and bonds with Amanda, entreating her to make some positive choice about her own life.

== Cast ==
- Matthew Broderick as Taylor Peters Mendon
- Brittany Snow as Amanda Tangerman
- Peter Facinelli as Greg
- Maura Tierney as Lorraine Mendon
- Steve Coogan as the Casino Pit Boss
- Daniel Roebuck as Link
- Bill Fagerbakke as Larry
- J. P. Manoux as Tony
- Jennifer Hall as Wendy
- Allie McCulloch as Eve
- Ed Begley Jr. as himself
- Kate Micucci as thin girl (uncredited)

== Reception ==
On review aggregator website Rotten Tomatoes, the film holds a 40% rank based on 43 reviews, with an average rating of 5.1/10. The site's critic's consensus states: "Despite a charming turn by Matthew Broderick, Finding Amanda is too flimsily executed to succeed as a dark comedy". On Metacritic, Finding Amanda has a score of 51 out of a 100 based on 17 critics, indicating "mixed or average" reviews.

Ronnie Scheib of Variety wrote, "Matthew Broderick regains his cinematic stride as a morosely wise-cracking television producer on the skids, ably abetted by Maura Tierney as his much-put-upon wife and Brittany Snow as his perky prostitute niece".

Mark Olsen of Los Angeles Times said, "Written with more bite, the premise might hold up, but as executed here by Tolan, is a soft-hearted, haphazard mess". Olsen added, "The problem comes largely in the conception of the hooker-niece character, Amanda, played by Brittany Snow. Tolan never quite figures out whether she is supposed to be a variation on the hooker-with-a-heart-of-gold or a genuinely troubled teen. One minute she’s blithely talking of her work as if it’s no big deal (in language unsuitable for a family newspaper), the next the character has taken a turn for melodrama, describing her first trick as a devastating emotional turning point."

Mick LaSalle of San Francisco Chronicle wrote that "Finding Amanda has some of the good and a lot of the bad aspects of a first film written and directed by the same person". Slant Magazine's Nick Schager called the film a "clumsy mashup of Leaving Las Vegas and Hardcore", while Cynthia Fuchs of PopMatters mentioned that "Too much of Peter Tolan's movie takes up Taylor's self-absorption as if it's actually interesting".

Roger Ebert of the Chicago Sun-Times gave a mixed review in which he praised the performances of Broderick and Coogan, but said the character of Amanda felt underwritten. He opined the film feels like "two [different] films fighting to occupy the same space", and said if the first storyline, which is about Taylor, his addictions, and casino host Jerry, was more developed than the plot line involving Amanda and her boyfriend, it would have made for a tonally better film.

In a positive review, Stephen Holden of The New York Times called Finding Amanda a "viciously funny satire…[that] offers a vision of confused Americans losing their already shaky bearings in the world's gaudiest honky-tonk".
