= The Retaliators (film) =

2021 horror film

- Theatrical release poster
- Directed by: Samuel Gonzalez Jr.; Bridget Smith
- Screenplay by: Darren Geare; Jeff Allen Geare
- Produced by: Allen Kovac; Michael Lombardi; Michael Walsh
- Starring: Michael Lombardi; Marc Menchaca; Joseph Gatt; Katie Kelly; Jacoby Shaddix; Zoltan Bathory; Ivan Moody
- Cinematography: Joseph Hennigan
- Edited by: Randy Bricker
- Music by: Kyle Dixon; Michael Stein
- Production company: Better Noise Films
- Release dates: August 30, 2021 (FrightFest); September 14, 2022 (United States)
- Running time: 110 minutes
- Country: United States
- Budget: $7.2 million
- Box office: $7,286

The Retaliators is a 2021 American action horror film starring Michael Lombardi, Marc Menchaca, and Joseph Gatt. The film also features appearances by musicians Tommy Lee, Jacoby Shaddix, Zoltan Bathory, and The HU. The film follows John Bishop (Michael Lombardi) whose daughter is brutally murdered and he proceeds to seek vengeance for her death.

The Retaliators premiered at the London FrightFest film festival on August 30, 2021, later released in theaters on September 14, 2022, in the United States, and on video-on-demand on October 21.

== Plot ==
While on a road trip, friends Sofie and Erica are stranded when their car breaks down on a rural road. Erica steps out to fix the tire but is violently dragged into the woods by what Sofie believes is a zombie. Pastor John Bishop arrives and saves Sofie, explaining that the attackers are not undead. Despite his intervention, the creatures soon overwhelm the area and kill Sofie.

Bishop’s teenage daughter, Sarah, a grieving high school senior still mourning her mother, attends a support group and seeks permission to attend a Christmas Eve party. That night, Sarah encounters gang member Ram Kady at a gas station and hears a man screaming from Ram’s trunk. She flees in fear, but Ram follows her, runs her off the road, binds her to her steering wheel, and pushes her car into a lake, killing her.

Detective Jed Sawyer, haunted by the past murder of his pregnant wife by serial rapist Quinn Brady, believes Sarah’s death was personal and begins investigating the gas station footage. Meanwhile, Ram is abducted by an unknown assailant and imprisoned in a cage, where he is tortured. His brother Vic, a gang leader, becomes increasingly violent while searching for him.

Jed eventually reveals to Bishop that Ram murdered Sarah and that he has been secretly imprisoning criminals in a hidden facility, allowing them to become feral. Jed urges Bishop to take revenge, but Bishop cannot bring himself to do it. Jed instead throws Ram to the other imprisoned criminals, including Quinn.

Vic and his men storm Jed’s building, wounding him and accidentally releasing the mutants, who slaughter the gang members. Jed kills several of the creatures but succumbs to his injuries. Ram survives the chaos and later attacks an elderly couple, forcing Bishop to confront him one last time. In a brutal fight, Bishop kills Ram using a wood chipper, finally avenging his daughter.

In the aftermath, Bishop begins to heal, speaking at his church and grief support group, and when he takes his younger daughter to softball practice, he confronts a bully parent, punching him in the mouth after asking his daughter to forgive him, showing he has learned force is needed to defend his values.

== Cast ==
- Michael Lombardi as John Bishop, a church pastor and single father.
- Marc Menchaca as Jed Sawyer, a detective investigating Sarah's murder.
- Joseph Gatt as Ram Kady, the gang member that killed Sarah.
- Jacoby Shaddix as Quinn Brady, a serial rapist from Jed's past.
- Sarah Nicklin as Emily
- Katie Kelly as Sarah Bishop, Bishop's teen daughter who is killed by Ram.
- Abbey Hafer as Rebecca Bishop, Bishop's youngest daughter.
- Ivan Moody as Vic Kady, Ram's brother and fellow gang member.
- Zoltan Bathory as Fang, one of Vic's men.
- Chris Kael as Decker, one of Vic's men.
- Robert John Burke as Briggs, the police captain.
- Brian O'Halloran as Intimidating Man, a rude man encountered by Bishop.
- Craig Mabbitt as Mutant
- Spencer Charnas as Max, a brothel member interrogated by Vic.
- Rachel Hilbert as Sofie

Additionally, American rock band From Ashes to New, makes a cameo appearance as "Church Band" in Bishop's church. Tommy Lee has an uncredited role.

== Production ==
With director, Bridget Smith of 'Sno Babies' and Samuel Gonzalez Jr., the film began shooting in March 2020, during the COVID-19 pandemic.

They finished post-production with Kyle Dixon and Michael Stein to score the soundtrack.

== Music ==
The theme song for the film "The Retaliators (21 Bullets)" was written by Nikki Sixx and James Michael and was released on August 5, 2022 as a lead track of the movie with the track featuring Mötley Crüe, Asking Alexandria, Ice Nine Kills, From Ashes to New, and Eva Under Fire ahead of the soundtrack release on September 16, 2022.

Jacoby Shaddix of Papa Roach, who stars as Quinn Brady in the film, announced to Allison Haggendorf of Spotify that their song "The Ending" will feature in the soundtrack. "When I heard about this film last year, I spoke to the creative team and I felt I had a vehicle to see if I could expand my range as an artist. Truly, I couldn't have imagined how much I enjoyed this experience and can't wait to find another film in the future". Shaddix collaborated with Mongolian band, The HU, on their song, "Wolf Totem," also featured on the soundtrack.

== Release ==
The Retaliators had its world premiere on August 30, 2021 at the FrightFest film festival in London, England, UK. The film made its American debut with a small screening due to COVID on October 12, 2021 at Screamfest held in Los Angeles, California and the film release was moved to 2022. The film was released in theaters on September 14, 2022, in the United States and on video on demand on October 21, 2022.

== Reception ==
On the review aggregator website Rotten Tomatoes, 86% of 44 critics' reviews are positive, with an average rating of 5.9/10. The website's consensus reads: "It may not offer much they haven't seen before, but strong-stomached exploitation enthusiasts will savor The Retaliators." Metacritic, which uses a weighted average, assigned the film a score of 48 out of 100, based on six critics, indicating "mixed or average" reviews.
