= Apache Stone =

American rock band

- Origin: New York City
- Genres: Rock, alternative
- Years active: 2008–present
- Label: unsigned
- Members: Mike Lombardi; Nick Bacon; Mark Greenberg; David Leatherwood; Hank Woods
- Website: apachestonemusic.com

Apache Stone is an American rock band from New York City.

== History ==
Apache Stone formed when Mike Lombardi and Hank Woods began playing together. Lombardi sang and wrote songs, with Woods playing guitar. Woods recruited three additional members to band - first the drummer Mark Greenberg, followed by David Leatherwood on bass and then Nick Bacon on guitar. In late 2009, drummer Mark Greenberg was replaced by Scott Garapolo, and bassist David Leatherwood was replaced by James Cruz. In 2009 they released their first full-length album, which was preceded by a four-track sample CD. Apache Stone was written into three Season 5 episodes (episodes 10, 17, 21) of the TV series Rescue Me, on which Lombardi plays firefighter Mike Silletti, with a sub-plot about the band's formation being included in the 2009 season. Ironically, a music agent in the TV series wants to sign the band, but only if they drop Lombardi's character in favor of another vocalist.
