= Robert Krausz =

Israeli commodities and futures trader

Robert Krausz (1936 – October 3, 2002) was an Israeli commodities and futures trader.

== Information ==
As a child born in Budapest, Hungary, Robert Krausz spent most of his childhood living in one of nine ghettos formed by the Nazis during World War II, established to confine Jews into tightly packed areas of the cities of Eastern Europe. He survived World War II by escaping from a group being led to a concentration camp. After the war, he ended up in a South African orphanage, where he was adopted by a local industrialist impressed with his intelligence.

In 1956 he joined the Israeli armed forces as a paratrooper. After the end of the war with Egypt, Robert moved to London, England, to pursue his passion for dress designing.

In 1988 he gave up his clothing business in London and moved to the U.S. to start a new career as a full-time technically oriented trader. He became a certified hypnotist and an advisor for the European Bank for Reconstruction and Development. Robert used Gann and fibonacci methods in his trading and coaching of new traders, encouraging them to use his fibonacci trader three timeframe method computer program.

Robert Krausz suffered a massive heart attack while addressing a group of traders in St. Augustine, Florida, and later died in a local hospital.

== Bibliography ==
=== Books ===
Krausz, Robert (2005). W. D. Gann Treasure Discovered. Marketplace Books; 2nd Bk&Vid edition. ISBN 1-59280-227-3.
