= Tommy Gavin =

Character in Rescue Me

- Leary as Tommy Gavin
- First appearance: "Guts"
- Last appearance: "Ashes"
- Portrayed by: Denis Leary

In-universe information
- Nicknames: Tom, Tommy Gun, "T", Asshole
- Gender: Male
- Occupation: Firefighter
- Family: John Michael Gavin (father, deceased); Martha Gavin (mother, deceased); Johnny Gavin (brother, deceased); Peggy Sue (Maggie) Gavin Garrity (sister); Timo Gavin (brother); Rosemary Gavin (sister); Liam Murphy (half-brother); Teddy Gavin (uncle); Jimmy Keefe (cousin, deceased); Micky Gavin (cousin); Eddie Gavin (cousin); Damien Keefe (first cousin once removed, godson)
- Spouse: Janet Gavin (wife)
- Children: Colleen Gavin (daughter); Connor Gavin (son, deceased); Katy Gavin (daughter); Wyatt Gavin (uncertain paternity: could be son or nephew, as possibly the son of his late brother, Johnny); Shea Gavin (son)

Thomas Michael "Tommy" Gavin is a fictional character and the protagonist of the FX comedy-drama series Rescue Me. He is portrayed by Denis Leary. For his portrayal, Leary was nominated for a Golden Globe Award (2005) and two Emmy Awards (2006 and 2007). Leary and Peter Tolan, the creators of Rescue Me, named the character after a police officer from the Bronx whom Leary knew.

== Biography ==
Thomas Michael Gavin (born December 19, 1963) is a third-generation New York City Fire Department firefighter of Irish Catholic origin, although he is a lapsed Catholic in adulthood.

Tommy followed in his father's footsteps and became a firefighter in 1986. Tommy was first assigned as a "Probie" or Probationary Firefighter to a firehouse in the Meatpacking District of Manhattan. Throughout his career, Tommy has transferred several times to firehouses in both Brooklyn and Uptown Manhattan. Tommy is currently the Senior Firefighter, or "Senior Man" of New York City Fire Department Ladder Company 62 (a.k.a. "62 Truck"), quartered with Engine Company 99 and the Chief of the 15th (later 30th) Battalion in northern Harlem, Manhattan. During one season of the show, Tommy was temporarily transferred to Engine Company 336/Ladder Company 73, a firehouse on Staten Island.

Tommy's fire company and firehouse lost four men during the attacks of 9/11, one of whom was Tommy's cousin and best friend, Jimmy Keefe. Jimmy had been the Senior Man of 62 Truck prior to his death. Tommy also personally knew fifty-six other firefighters who were killed on 9/11. Tommy is also a motivational speaker/consultant for the New York City Fire Academy, as seen in the pilot and final episodes. Tommy is a working class, blue collar personality with skills in carpentry, mechanics and plumbing as well as his firefighting career. Tommy likes to drive pickup trucks as his personal vehicle including a mid 90s Ford F-150, a new Cadillac Escalade (briefly, after being given it as a gift by Jimmy's widow Sheila), and a Dodge Ram 1500. Tommy has also shown skill in hand-to-hand combat and firearms usage.

Tommy is married to his high school sweetheart Janet Gavin, who became pregnant with their oldest daughter, Colleen, when she was only seventeen. The two are "separated" numerous times, but the announcement is occasionally followed by Tommy stating that they never filed for divorce, making the couple technically still married throughout the entire series. Their relationship is mostly estranged; however at some points they appear to be friendly. They've had five children together, two girls (Colleen and Katy) and three boys (Wyatt, Shea, and the late Connor). Connor was killed in a hit-and-run accident, putting further strain on Tommy and Janet's relationship, and causing Tommy to become a fully relapsed alcoholic. Wyatt, however, is strongly believed by both Tommy and Janet to be the product of Janet's affair with Tommy's brother, NYPD Detective Johnny Gavin, who had been killed in the line of duty, although a paternity test was never done. Tommy is also throughout the series in an off-and-on affair with his dead cousin's widow, Sheila Keefe. The two are seen sleeping together numerous times on the basis of sharing mutual grief over Jimmy Keefe's death, fueled by Tommy's troubled relationship with Janet. (Tommy was punished by the subordinate firefighters in his house for it in the season 1 finale, as "widow banging" was a forbidden act in the FDNY, however, despite the continuing of it throughout the series, no further discipline ever happened.)

Tommy is a tortured character. He is a relapsed alcoholic, as well as a chain-smoker and a prescription-drug addict due to his role as a first responder to the World Trade Center attacks on 9/11. Throughout the series, a recurring theme is that Tommy is highly mentally and emotionally disturbed as a result of what he witnessed on 9/11. Because of the painful loss he endured, Tommy suffers from survivor's guilt and severe PTSD. Tommy is often visited by "ghosts," deceased people from his past – most frequently his cousin Jimmy and other firefighters who died on 9/11 - as well as fire victims he could not save. It is left ambiguous whether these are real ghosts or figments of Tommy's imagination.

For the first, fifth, sixth, and seventh seasons, Tommy lives in Queens. During the second, third, and fourth season, Tommy lived in various apartments in Manhattan.

Season 1

Throughout the first season of Rescue Me, Tommy lives across the street from his estranged wife Janet in Queens. In the premiere, he gives a speech about being a firefighter to the Academy's senior firefighting class. His cousin, Jimmy Keefe, a firefighter from Tommy's company who died on 9/11, visits him as a ghost. Tommy and Sheila (his cousin Jimmy's widow) are having an affair. When confronted about their relationship, he refuses to end it because Sheila is pregnant. At the end of the season, he requests a transfer after a breakdown during a rescue that resulted in injury to his co-worker, Firefighter Franco Rivera. His wife and children leave their home and move.

Season 2

Tommy is working at a different firehouse on Staten Island. Sheila miscarries, but does not tell him. He and his brother Johnny discover that during their childhood, their father had a long-term affair that produced two children. They suspect that their half-brother, a priest, is a pedophile. Tommy and his family reconcile. Tommy's son Connor is tragically killed in a hit-and-run accident involving a drunk driver. Johnny finds out that the driver may not do time, so Tommy's uncle, retired FDNY Firefighter, Teddy Gavin kills him inside Hoboken Terminal, and is thus sent to prison.

Season 3

Tommy is again living on his own. He discovers that his brother Johnny is having an affair with Janet, and that his co-worker, Firefighter Sean Garrity is in a relationship with his mentally unstable sister Maggie Gavin. During Janet's affair with Johnny, Tommy forces himself on her. Thus, when Janet becomes pregnant, the paternity of the baby is in question. Johnny is killed while investigating a drug case as an NYPD detective. In the last episode of the season, Sheila drugs Tommy, rapes him, and then accidentally sets her Long Island beach house on fire. Tommy is rescued by a female volunteer firefighter.

Season 4

Tommy is living with his wife and children again. Janet is suffering from postpartum depression, so Tommy "sells" her son Wyatt to Sheila. Tommy then shares custody with Sheila. Battalion Chief Jerry Reilly commits suicide after being forced to retire and due to his frustration at having a newly married gay son. Tommy begins fighting fires during his off hours wearing Jimmy Keefe's gear, prompting Battalion Chief Sidney Feinberg to write him up for a department section 8. The last scene in the last episode shows Tommy and his father, also a retired FDNY Firefighter, watching a Newark Bears minor league baseball game. Tommy tries to get the attention of his father only to realize that he has passed on, so Tommy puts his arm around his father and continues to watch the game.

Season 5

Tommy has his section 8 hearing and the doctor, who has a bitter history with Feinberg, lets Tommy off without thinking twice. Lou and Tommy get into a brawl after Lou decides to have Needles be his best man at his wedding. Also, Tommy's wife, Janet, has a new lover, Dwight (Michael J. Fox), who has a disability from an accident that occurred years previously. Tommy is disdainful towards Dwight, but does not accept Dwight's drug addiction. Tommy has completed one full year without a drink, but relapses due to grief at a restaurant near the site of the September 11 attacks when being interviewed by a French journalist interested in writing a book about Tommy's and other firefighters' experiences during the 9/11 tragedy. Tommy leaves behind his twelve-month sobriety chip at the bottom of his glass. After a failed intervention by his family to stop his relapse, Tommy ends up convincing most of them to start drinking again as well. This results in the death of Teddy's wife Ellie in a car crash. Teddy holds Tommy responsible and shoots Tommy twice in the shoulder at the bar where they work after hours, and forces his friends at gunpoint to watch him bleed out on the floor. The episode fades out without the viewer knowing if Tommy lives or survives.

Season 6

Season 6 deals with the aftermath of Tommy's near-death experience, including his ongoing battle with alcoholism, his oldest daughter's own drinking problem, and an increasingly strained relationship with his wife. During this season, Tommy struggles to make things right and become a better person, having realized that he went to hell after what he saw during his near-death experience. Tommy's firehouse is temporarily closed by the city due to budget cuts, but after Needles gets into a quarrel with one of the Chiefs and tells about the bravery of his men, the firehouse is re-opened after the men's heroic actions in saving children trapped in a burning school nearby the firehouse on their day off. Near the end of the season, probationary firefighter Damien Keefe, Sheila and Jimmy Keefe's son, who recently was assigned to Ladder 62, suffers a traumatic head injury while fighting a fire, which leaves him severely brain-damaged and unable to walk or communicate.

Season 7

Season 7 is the final season and deals with Janet's fifth pregnancy, and the unlikely reconciliation and friendship between Sheila and Janet. When Tommy gives an interview about Jimmy to a news reporter, the reporter asks cheap-shot questions which lead Tommy to go on a rant involving swearing and obscene gestures on national television, leading to Tommy's indefinite suspension. Following the interview, Franco considers leaving the firehouse before his own life becomes too tainted. After Franco gets into a fight with Needles, he gets into a fight with Tommy. Tommy's suspension was later lifted with Sheila's help, as well as Tommy's hockey opponents on the NYPD who have dirt on the reporter.

Tommy walks his daughter Colleen down the aisle (alongside Teddy) as she marries Black Sean. Moments later, Janet and Tommy renew their vows after Tommy promises to quit drinking, smoking, and reluctantly retire from active firefighting and take a safer job in the FDNY. A day after the wedding, during one of Tommy's last tours of duty as a New York City Firefighter, the crew responds to a devastating four-alarm fire. They initially have a means of escape, but they hear children inside and Tommy attempts to run in after them (with the crew boldly following Tommy's backside). After the crew finds the children, they lose their point of extraction and try to find another way up to the roof. But after busting open the trapdoor, they find out the exit is sealed by a brick wall. Chief Nelson makes the call to evacuate the building, as the crew of Ladder 62 tries hard to find their way out. As Tommy goes up to find an escape, Lieutenant Ken Shea, Tommy's best friend, tells Tommy "Just go, we'll be fine, Trust me." Seconds later, an explosion guts the building.

It is revealed in the series finale that Lieutenant Ken ("Lou") Shea is killed in the explosion, with the other members of Ladder 62 surviving the explosion with relatively minor injuries. (The episode starts, however, as if it's the other way around, with Lou walking with a cane to give a eulogy for the other guys, only to find it to be a dream Tommy was having.) After he assumes the Lieutenant's position and completes the scene of the fire report, Tommy puts in his retirement papers and announces his intention to retire from active duty. An altercation at a playground to which he had taken Wyatt calls into question his ability to adapt to civilian life. After delivering his infant son at the family's apartment, Janet encourages Tommy to return to 62 Truck.

The final scenes following Lou's funeral show Tommy giving a passionate speech about courage and the call of being a firefighter to a group of FDNY recruits at the New York City Fire Academy, as the other members of 62 Truck look on. Tommy turns over the floor to his new commanding officer, the newly promoted Lieutenant Franco Rivera, who begins to berate the probies as Tommy drives off in his truck while having a conversation with Lou's ghost.

== Controversial storyline ==
Leary's character was involved in a controversial storyline in Rescue Me's third season. In the episode "Sparks", first aired on June 20, 2006, Tommy sexually forces himself on Janet. At first Janet fights back, but then appears to accept the situation and enjoys it. Tommy smirks when he leaves the house. Television reviewers, bloggers, and fans complained about the scene. There was debate about whether Tommy had raped Janet. Janet's reaction and Tommy's expression caused as much reaction as the assault itself, with critics saying that it made rape look unimportant, unrealistic, and that Tommy's actions were condoned. Leary did not apologize, saying that what happened between the characters was not rape, and that the scene made sense in the context of Tommy's dysfunctional relationship with Janet. In other episodes, Tommy is drugged and sexually assaulted by Sheila on two different occasions.

Peter Tolan, co-creator of Rescue Me and co-writer of the episode, discussed the storyline in a forum on the website Television Without Pity. He defended the scene, but acknowledged that some viewers may not have interpreted the scene in the way he and Leary had intended. John Landgraf, the president of FX, stated that he knew that the scene might be controversial when the scripts were being written. Leary stated that he was glad the show was on FX rather than a broadcast network that would not have supported the storyline.
