= Rescue Me (American TV series) =

American firefighter comedy-drama TV series

- Genre: Comedy drama; Black comedy; Psychological drama
- Created by: Peter Tolan; Denis Leary
- Showrunners: Peter Tolan; Denis Leary
- Starring: Denis Leary; Michael Lombardi; James McCaffrey; Jack McGee; Steven Pasquale; Andrea Roth; John Scurti; Robert John Burke; Daniel Sunjata; Diane Farr; Callie Thorne; Dean Winters; Tatum O’Neal; Adam Ferrara; Larenz Tate
- Opening theme: "C'mon C'mon" by The Von Bondies
- Composers: Christopher Tyng; Adam Roth; Brad Hatfield
- Country of origin: United States
- Original language: English
- No. of seasons: 7
- No. of episodes: 93 (list of episodes)

Production
- Executive producers: Jim Serpico; Denis Leary; Kerry Orent; Peter Tolan
- Producers: Denis Leary; Kerry Orent; Alyson Evans; Evan Reilly
- Cinematography: Tom Houghton; Jonathan Freeman
- Editors: John Axness; Joel Goodman; Paul Anderson; Thomas M. Bolger; Finnian Murray; Leslie Tolan
- Running time: 40–60 minutes
- Production companies: The Cloudland Company; Apostle; DreamWorks Television; Sony Pictures Television

Original release
- Network: FX
- Release: July 21, 2004 – September 7, 2011

Rescue Me is an American comedy drama television series that aired on FX from July 21, 2004, to September 7, 2011. The series focuses on the professional and personal lives of a group of New York City firefighters.

The protagonist and focal point of the series is veteran New York City firefighter Tommy Gavin (Denis Leary). The series follows Tommy's troubled family and co-workers as they deal with real-life issues, such as post-9/11 trauma or their own domestic problems. Tommy struggles with the loss of his cousin and best friend, firefighter Jimmy Keefe (James McCaffrey), as well as 59 other firefighters whom he knew who died in the World Trade Center on September 11, 2001. Jimmy frequently visits Tommy in ghostly dreams.

Tommy is an impatient, self-loathing, hypocritical, manipulative relapsed alcoholic who suffers with severe survivor guilt and posttraumatic stress disorder as a result of 9/11. In the pilot episode, he and his wife Janet (Andrea Roth) have already separated, although they are technically still married, and Tommy has moved across the street. Most of Tommy's actions as a firefighter are heroic and brave, but his family members and fellow firefighters view him as selfish, despite his concern for others and passion for the job.

Rescue Me was created by Leary and Peter Tolan, who also serve as executive producers and head writers, and was produced by Cloudland Company, Apostle, DreamWorks Television, and Sony Pictures Television.

== Series overview ==
Season	Episodes	Originally aired	
Season	Episodes	First aired	Last aired
1	13	July 21, 2004	October 13, 2004
2	13	June 21, 2005	September 13, 2005
3	13	May 30, 2006	August 29, 2006
4	13	June 13, 2007	September 12, 2007
Minisodes	10	June 24, 2008	August 26, 2008
5	22	April 7, 2009	September 1, 2009
6	10	June 29, 2010	August 31, 2010
7	9	July 13, 2011	September 7, 2011

=== Season 1 ===
Season 1 of Rescue Me debuted on July 21, 2004, and began by introducing the members of New York City Fire Department's fictional Ladder Company 62—aka "62 Truck"—quartered with the fictional Engine Company 99 and the Chief of the 15th (later 30th) Battalion in a firehouse in northeastern Harlem, New York City. Tommy Gavin deals with the effects of the September 11, 2001, attacks, which, for him, include seeing the ghost of his cousin, Firefighter Jimmy Keefe, who died on 9/11, as well as the ghosts of various people he failed to save over the years. Gavin and his wife Janet are separated and, from across the street, he sees her begin to date again. He plans to get her back and prevent her from leaving the state with his children. Janet separated from Tommy several months prior, due to his failure to commit to his family and open up about 9/11.

15th Battalion Chief Jerry Reilly attacks a gay former firefighter in a bar after the former FDNY member speaks to the press and claims that at least 20 of the 343 men who died during the 9/11 attacks were gay. Sean Garrity begins to date one of Franco Rivera's numerous ex-girlfriends, which leads to Franco's discovering that he has a daughter with the woman; Rivera later takes the daughter in after the mother fatally overdoses. Tommy begins a love affair with Jimmy's widow Sheila (a taboo among firefighters), and Probationary Firefighter Mike Silletti begins to secretly date a "fat chick" named Theresa (Ashlie Atkinson). Lieutenant Ken Shea, Tommy's superior officer, deals with 9/11 by secretly writing poetry and then starts to have an affair after learning his wife is preparing to leave him anyway.

After firefighter Billy Warren dies in a fire, the city sends Laura Miles to replace him. She clashes with the men and Tommy in particular. She begins to believe that Tommy is becoming dangerous as he takes more unnecessary risks on the job. Tommy's mistake at a fire causes injury to Franco; this coincides with Tommy's transfer out of the house after the rest of the crew discovers he has been seeing Sheila and they're expecting a child. In the final scene of the season finale, Tommy shows up at his wife's house to find her and his children missing, along with everything in the house. While consuming a bottle of vodka he finds in a cupboard, he uses a baseball bat to destroy anything that's left in the house.

=== Season 2 ===
Season 2 premiered on June 21, 2005.

Tommy is at a new firehouse on Staten Island and his replacement at 62 Truck, Sully, becomes everyone's favorite. While responding to a fire at an underground sex club, they discover that a "woman" they rescued is Sully in a black leather skirt and bustier. The next day, Sully requests a transfer because he knows the crew will never let him live that down. This clears the way for Tommy to return.

Back in the old house, Tommy shifts his focus to finding his family and dealing with his father, who took an unannounced vacation and came home with a new, wealthy wife, Jenny Ng. Sheila has a miscarriage, but lies about it to keep Tommy close. Later on, Sheila begins a relationship with a woman named Debbie who turns abusive towards her. Tommy and his brother Johnny Gavin learn that their father, Michael Gavin, had a long, ongoing affair during their childhood, which produced two children. Eventually their new-found half brother, who is a priest, is arrested after they discover he is a pedophile.

Silletti stalks his ex-girlfriend after she dumps him. Chief Jerry's wife gradually deteriorates from Alzheimer's, and he is forced to seek help from his estranged son before placing her in a long-term care facility. Laura and Franco begin dating, but Laura eventually leaves Franco and the firehouse. Lieutenant Shea is conned by a prostitute named Candy, resulting in his losing his entire life savings. Jenny Ng dies, but the expected financial windfall for Tommy's father never happens. Tommy's estranged sister Maggie re-enters the lives of Tommy and his father.

Tommy and his family reconcile for a time, but when their only son Connor is killed by a drunk driver, it is too much for Janet to handle, and she blames Tommy. Matters worsen when Johnny learns that the driver is well-connected and may not be sentenced, so Tommy's uncle Teddy murders the man in public.

=== Season 3 ===
Season 3 premiered on May 30, 2006.

Tommy and Janet have re-separated, and Teddy is in jail for murder. Janet begins sleeping with Johnny Gavin, and Tommy attacks Johnny at their father's 83rd birthday dinner.

Meanwhile, Lieutenant Shea, still smarting from getting conned, becomes testy with everyone on the crew and slowly spirals downward. Janet wants to talk to Tommy about their settlement, but a heated argument ignites and Tommy rapes Janet. Mike Silletti, no longer a Probationary Firefighter, begins a sexual relationship with his male roommate, and Tommy falls back in love with Sheila. Sheila, desiring Tommy to stay away from Janet completely, begins to drug him with rohypnol and Viagra in order to rape him. Maggie soon finds herself dating Sean Garrity, among others.

Janet gets pregnant with either Johnny's or Tommy's baby, and announces she wants to keep it to replace Connor. The crew learns about Mike's possible homosexuality, and Tommy comes to his defense out of fears over the fire crew breaking up. Franco starts to date Alicia (Susan Sarandon), a wealthy older woman who eventually takes his daughter from him. (He is unable to do anything about it, because he had taken her from foster care without permission and therefore is not the girl's legal guardian.)

Lieutenant Shea moves in with Tommy and begins seeing Theresa, a soon-to-be ex-nun with whom he plans on moving to Florida to be first mate on his cousin's boat. Chief Reilly tries to meet his wife's increasing health care costs by taking a second job at a bar. Later, he suffers a heart attack after having sex with Karlene, an illegal Jamaican immigrant who is a caretaker at the long-term care facility where his wife now lives.

During a stakeout, Johnny is killed by someone who was contracted to stop him from testifying against a powerful drug dealer Johnny had arrested months beforehand. During his funeral, Sean and Maggie decide to get married at the cemetery. Tommy, Johnny, and Maggie's long lost sister Rosemary Gavin is introduced; she is deaf and had been shunned by her parents, but reconciles with her father.

Uncle Teddy, still in prison, receives numerous letters from a woman named Ellie, who is proud of the action he took upon Connor's killer. The two begin a relationship and get married, which allows Ellie to meet with him for conjugal visits.

With the 62 Truck crew seemingly breaking up, Tommy decides to retire and move in with Sheila in her new home on Long Island. He changes his mind after talking with Janet about her pregnancy and discovering that his crew will remain together after all. (Mike isn't transferring, Lou has changed his mind about the boat after discovering he lacked "sea legs", and Franco has failed a lieutenant's exam.) Jerry defends his crew when several officials visit his firehouse.

While at Sheila's new house, Tommy tells her he is not retiring from the FDNY. Distraught, she drugs him again and accidentally starts a fire. The fire spreads while the frantic Sheila is overwhelmed by frustration, and the finale closes without making it clear if Tommy survives.

=== Season 4 ===
Season 4 premiered on June 13, 2007.

Tommy and Sheila are apparently rescued by volunteer firefighters, but are then accused of arson and insurance fraud. Janet has given birth, and while Tommy has come to accept it as his own, the baby's hair finally comes in and it is "jet black" in color, leaving them to now believe that it is Johnny's son, instead.

Teddy is released from prison and immediately abandons his new wife Ellie in a coffee shop. Colleen runs away from home and moves in with her boyfriend, Tony, leaving her parents enraged.

Depressed after being told that he can no longer serve in active duty due to his poor heart, Jerry takes a desk job. After using his position behind a computer to tamper with evidence, effectively clearing Tommy of the arson charges, Jerry commits suicide. As a result, the firehouse brings in a new chief.

Janet has postpartum depression and is deeply affected by her inability to bond with her new son. The baby cries constantly, and his crying seems to worsen when Janet holds him. Getting wind of this, Sheila hounds Tommy about giving her the baby, offering $500,000 in payment. Seeing how his wife is suffering, how the baby is being neglected and seemingly rejected by everyone in the family but himself, Tommy reluctantly begins to reconsider Sheila's offer.

Tommy decides to give the baby to Sheila after contemplating dumping him into the Hudson River at the request of Johnny's ghost. After Tommy confesses this to Janet, she leaves with their youngest daughter Kathy. Janet sends Katy up to Sheila's apartment to steal the baby back. Meanwhile, Tommy has a breakdown in which all of his ghostly visitors, including Jimmy, tell him they are fed up with his selfishness.

Tommy then shares custody with Sheila by bribing his daughter Colleen with a no limit credit card. Colleen gives the baby to Tommy whenever she has him, so he can in turn give him to Sheila. After Tommy learns that Colleen's boyfriend, Tony, used the credit card to buy a wedding ring, Tommy attacks him in his recording studio. Tony tells Tommy the ring wasn't for Colleen, but for another girl. Relieved, Tommy apologizes to Tony and wishes him and his new girlfriend the best of luck. When Tony explains this to Colleen, he says he left her because Tommy scares him, which makes Colleen hate Tommy even more.

Maggie Gavin and Sean Garrity are on-again and off-again throughout the season, with Garrity pretending to be an alcoholic like Maggie to spend more time with her, leading to the two divorcing.

The Gavin family starts their own AA meetings due to the high number of alcoholics in the family. Michael Gavin, Tommy's father, refuses to attend meetings, but contacts Tommy and ironically tells him that he's going to be sober to "keep his friends close and his enemies closer."

Tommy also begins seeing a woman named Valerie (Gina Gershon), who can't be touched after she orgasms. She and Tommy are on and off due to Tommy's periodic desire for his ex-wife Janet. Janet has taken a job, where she begins dating her much-younger boss.

A new firefighter named Bart joins the house, after Lou and Franco negotiated to get him for their basketball team. Bart says he goes by his nickname, Shawn, so the crew decides to call him "Black Shawn" to distinguish him from Sean Garrity. Black Shawn is not happy with this. Using the basketball team as leverage, Shawn expects to not be referred to as "Probie" and to be absolved of any probie work. This initially angers Garrity, Mike, and Tommy. However, after Black Shawn shows himself worthy in the face of a raging fire, the entire crew accepts him, and even Tommy pays him grudging respect.

The season concludes with Tommy, Lou, Sean, Michael Gavin, and Uncle Teddy attending a Newark Bears minor league baseball game at the request of Michael while Colleen attends a picnic with Black Shawn. Tommy tries to show Michael a hit, but he doesn't respond. Tommy realizes that his father has died, wraps his arm around him, and continues to watch the game.

=== Minisodes ===
On June 23, 2008, webisodes seasons premiered on Crackle and between shows on FX. Ten episodes aired.

The webisodes are largely stand-alone pieces, often showing the group in action rescuing people in fires, dream-like scenarios (such as Tommy imagining a night out with his various romantic interests), or general slice of life scenes set inside the station house.

One story depicts Truck 62 in the moments before the fire crew left the station to respond to the September 11, 2001, attack on the World Trade Center.

=== Season 5 ===
The series was renewed for a fifth season of 22 episodes. Michael J. Fox joined the cast, playing Janet's new love interest.

Conspiracy theories swarm Truck 62, especially from Franco, which lead to tensions within and outside Truck 62. Tommy and Lou vie for the affections of the woman (Karina Lombard) who is writing a 9/11 story. Silletti gets insurance money and an inheritance following his mother's death in season 4, and is convinced by Franco and Garrity to invest it in a bar. The bar becomes a popular after-hours place for the fire crew.

Garrity suffers renal carcinoma and requires surgery, forcing him to reunite with his estranged mother and brother. Damian, Sheila and Jimmy's son, finishes training and joins the firehouse as a probie. A woman named Kelly (Maura Tierney) rushes into a fire that the crew is fighting and retrieves a mysterious metal suitcase. Tommy appears to shun both Janet and Sheila to spend time with Kelly. While there are some romantic undertones, Tommy is more interested in why the suitcase was so important to Kelly.

Candy (Milena Govich), the prostitute who conned Lou in season 2, reappears after being released from jail, claiming that she has turned her life around. After Lou's vehement dismissals, he lets her move in with him. After Candy claims to have inherited a large sum of money, they marry, combining their assets. A brief time later, Lou discovers that Candy's real name is Barbara Callahan, and she is wanted in Florida for fraud. He empties their joint bank account, taking back the money she stole from him, including interest, and confronts her. When Barbara denies the allegations, Lou tells her that he's called the police; if she's truly innocent, she'll wait for them to arrive, and if guilty, she'll run. Barbara ends up fleeing.

Tommy's extended family — Cousin Mickey (Robert John Burke), Cousin Eddie (Terry Serpico), Uncle Teddy (Lenny Clarke), and Teddy's wife Ellie (Patti D'Arbanville) — as they all return to drinking after spending several unsuccessful months in AA. The four are drinking one night with Tommy when a drunk Ellie leaves to pick up a dog she and Teddy had adopted. Shortly after leaving, Ellie runs a red light and gets hit by an 18-wheeler, killing her instantly.

In the final episode, Janet and Sheila convince Kelly to no longer see Tommy, and lie to her about something Tommy didn't do. Enraged over losing a positive relationship with Kelly, Tommy threatens Sheila and breaks up with her. After Tommy and Lou "kidnap" Katy from Janet as revenge for the incident with Kelly, the two and the crew of Ladder 62 go to their bar. Teddy eventually arrives and blames Ellie's death on Tommy. Teddy proceeds to shoot Tommy twice in the shoulder, leaving him to bleed to death, and threatens to kill anyone who tries to leave and seek help.

=== Season 6 ===
Season 6 premiered on June 29, 2010. Tommy is miraculously saved and during his ambulance ride to the hospital, experiences a vision of going to hell. Tommy subsequently vows to change his ways, to stop drinking, and to be a better person, firefighter, father, and husband.

Janet alerts Tommy that Colleen, now 21-years-old, is becoming an alcoholic, leading Tommy to take drastic measures. Janet also seeks to force Tommy to permanently sever ties with Sheila, as Sheila uses her son Damian and his position in Tommy's fire crew as leverage to continue their affair, even as she begins to date Tommy's ex-priest cousin Mickey. Tommy and Janet reconnect, even as their daughter Katy threatens to disown them after she is accepted into a private boarding school away from the city.

Engine Company 99/Ladder Company 62 Firehouse is targeted for closure due to citywide budget cuts, which would leave the community it serves without any fire and emergency rescue services. This causes a major power struggle to break out between Battalion Chief "Needles" Nelson and his superior, Battalion (later Deputy) Chief Feinberg. Feinberg is accused by Needles of betraying the firefighters under him, as it appears Feinberg has made a corrupt bargain that will give him command over another existing house, nearby Engine Company 333/Ladder Company 74, in exchange for allowing his station to be shut down (and his men laid off and/or transferred).

Taking matters into his own hands, Needles video-records Tommy and the crew rushing to the aid of deaf children when a fire breaks out at the community school, while the firefighters are all off-duty. The first fire company arrives late to the scene, long after Needles' crew has saved the children. Needles promptly uses the video to blackmail his and Feinberg's superiors into saving the house from any budget shutdowns, earning Needles the praise of his underlings, and exposing Feinberg's disdain for Tommy and the rest of the rank and file firefighters.

Damian — who had begun to have doubts about being a firefighter, only to be talked into continuing by Tommy — suffers a traumatic head injury while fighting a fire, which leaves him severely brain-damaged and unable to walk or communicate. The strain of dealing with her son's incurable condition breaks up Sheila and Mickey's relationship. Amidst Tommy trying to balance both Sheila and Janet, Janet reminds him that Damian is not his responsibility, and that he should be more concerned with his own children. Tommy realizes he needs to be more proactive and committed if he is going to change his ways.

=== Season 7 ===
The seventh and final season of the series premiered on Wednesday, July 13, 2011.

Tommy confronts Janet about her pregnancy, and is told that the only way she will have the child is if Tommy retires from the FDNY and takes a safer job. Janet is supported by Sheila, and the two women bond together over their shared grief of losing a son (despite Damian not being dead).

Tommy's stress about his job is exacerbated when Colleen and Black Shawn become engaged. Tommy's frustrations get the better of him during an interview about 9/11 and Jimmy, who is the subject of a hero piece. Tommy hurls obscene gestures and expletives at the reporter and leaves the interview. Enraged by the interview, Franco looks to move beyond 62 Truck before his own life becomes too tainted and feuds with Needles and Tommy.

The reporter for Tommy's interview begins hanging around the building and digging through the past of the guys on 62 Truck for more stories. After the crew realizes the sheer volume of bad press this would generate, Tommy reaches out to Johnny's old contacts at the police department. He manages to obtain a video of the reporter performing oral sex on another officer after being busted with cocaine, which Sheila uses to scare her off.

After hearing about other firefighters writing letters to their family members in case they died in the line of duty, Tommy writes letters to his family and the guys, and gives them to Lou to hand them out if he dies. Lou reads his immediately and is busted by Tommy, having set him up to steal a box of cupcakes he had stowed under his bunk for Janet. Due to increasing pressure from the crew (who had to fake Lou's physical for him), Lou starts a weight-loss regimen, and Tommy promises that if Lou loses weight he will make him the godfather of their new child. Lou struggles with his diet, and eventually lashes out at Tommy that food is how he copes with the hole that 9/11 created in him and that Tommy simply filled his hole with booze instead.

Tommy writes Lou another, legitimate letter and gives it to him. Lou reads it and is moved to tears by his friend. Lou gives Sheila and Janet their letters, as they were angry with Tommy at the time, and both start being much kinder to Tommy. However, the letter Janet received was written by Lou, who accidentally burned the real one, and it promises that Tommy would quit the FDNY for her, unbeknownst to Tommy.

Colleen and Black Shawn finally marry. During the wedding reception, a drunken Sheila suggests Tommy and Janet renew their vows, which Colleen and Katy second. Tommy is blindsided when Janet adds a new vow of him promising to retire from active duty, and take an administrative or training job. Tommy hesitates, but after Katy threatens to start drinking and become a prostitute, he agrees to take Janet's vow.

During one of Tommy's last tours of duty as a firefighter, Engine 99 and Ladder 62 respond to a warehouse fire that quickly escalates. Both Chief Feinberg and Chief Nelson take command and call for a fourth alarm. The men see hanging latex gloves and the smell of diesel fuel, realizing they are in the middle of an arson attempt. After reaching a window to escape, they hear voices of kids still inside. They locate the kids but are unable to reach the ladder, and try to make for the roof. However, the door to the roof has been bricked over, trapping them inside. The chauffeur firefighter of Ladder 62, Niels Jorgensen, reports he can't rescue the men from the outside and has to leave the roof before it collapses. Tommy is about to leave the group and look for another route out after Lou tells him to go, obviously reminded about his vow to Janet. Tommy asks if Lou is sure, and Lou replies, "We'll be fine, trust me." Seconds later, a massive explosion guts the building.

The series finale begins with Lou eulogizing Tommy, Franco, Sean, Black Shawn, and Mike during a joint funeral with family, friends, and many other firefighters. This all turns out to be Tommy's dream. Tommy becomes acting Lieutenant, and while filling out a department report for Needles on that final incident, it is revealed that it was in fact only Lou who died, after having his face burned off in the fire. The recovering crew all contemplate their futures in leaving Ladder Company 62 and firefighting in general. Tommy files for retirement; Franco passes the Lieutenant's exam awaiting reassignment; Mike and Sean consider transferring; and Black Shawn considers quitting for Colleen.

Tommy eventually finds a letter that Lou has left him in the event of his death, to be read at the scattering of his ashes. Tommy reads Lou's letter, which tells the guys to remain together, then spreads Lou's "remains". (Lou's ashes had to be replaced with dry cake mix after the crew had a mishap on the way.) Immediately after the service, Janet goes into labor at home, and Tommy delivers his son. After some debate over a name, Janet decides to name the baby Shea Gavin in honor of Lou. After an earlier scolding from Sheila and an incident with Wyatt at a playground involving liberal parents, Janet realizes that Tommy, regardless of everything, is not yet ready to retire.

Tommy speaks to the new academy class, but this time with more clarity and a warning not to drown their sorrows with sex, violence, and alcohol. As newly appointed Lieutenant Franco Rivera takes over, Tommy returns to his truck and converses with Lou's ghost. The two make their peace and Tommy drives away. The episode ends with The Pogues' "Dirty Old Town" playing as the camera pans over to the Manhattan skyline, where 1 World Trade Center's construction progress can be seen.

== Cast and characters ==
Rescue Me mainly focuses on Tommy Gavin's family and the men of his firehouse, but many other characters are introduced over the seven seasons who stay on as regular characters. Recurring guests include Maura Tierney, Artie Lange, Susan Sarandon, Desmond Harrington, Marisa Tomei, Gina Gershon, Peter Gallagher, Michael J. Fox, Cam Neely, Will Chase, Lyndon Byers, Phil Esposito, and Jennifer Esposito.

=== Main ===
Actor	Character	Role							
Actor	Character	Role	1	2	3	4	5	6	7
Denis Leary	Thomas Michael "Tommy" Gavin	New York City Fire Department (FDNY) Firefighter, 1st Grade, Ladder Company 62 (62 Truck) (Senior Man)	Main	Main	Main	Main	Main	Main	Main
John Scurti	Kenneth "Lou" Shea	New York City Fire Department (FDNY) Lieutenant, Ladder Company 62 (62 Truck)	Main	Main	Main	Main	Main	Main	Main
Daniel Sunjata	Franco Rivera	New York City Fire Department (FDNY) Firefighter, 1st Grade (later Lieutenant), Ladder Company 62 (62 Truck)	Main	Main	Main	Main	Main	Main	Main
Steven Pasquale	Sean Leslie Garrity	New York City Fire Department (FDNY) Firefighter/Emergency Medical Technician (EMT), 1st Grade, Ladder Company 62 (62 Truck)	Main	Main	Main	Main	Main	Main	Main
Michael Lombardi	Mike Silletti	New York City Fire Department (FDNY) Probationary Firefighter (later Firefighter, 1st Grade), Ladder Company 62 (62 Truck)	Main	Main	Main	Main	Main	Main	Main
Andrea Roth	Janet Gavin	Tommy Gavin's wife	Main	Main	Main	Main	Main	Main	Main
Jack McGee	Jerry Reilly	New York City Fire Department (FDNY) Battalion Chief, 15th Battalion	Main	Main	Main	Main			
James McCaffrey	James Xavier "Jimmy" Keefe	New York City Fire Department (FDNY) Firefighter/Emergency Medical Technician (EMT), 1st Grade, Ladder Company 62 (62 Truck) (Senior Man), Tommy Gavin's cousin (Deceased, 9/11)	Main	Main	Main	Recurring	Recurring	Recurring	Recurring
Callie Thorne	Sheila Keefe	Jimmy Keefe's widow, Tommy Gavin's lover	Recurring	Main	Main	Main	Main	Main	Main
Diane Farr	Laura Miles	New York City Fire Department (FDNY) Firefighter, 1st Grade, Ladder Company 62 (62 Truck)	Recurring	Main					
Dean Winters	Johnny Gavin	New York City Police Department (NYPD) Detective, Tommy Gavin's Brother	Recurring	Recurring	Main	Recurring	Recurring		Recurring
Tatum O'Neal	Peggy Sue "Maggie" Gavin Garrity	Sister of Tommy Gavin, Ex-Wife of Sean Garrity		Recurring	Recurring	Main	Recurring	Recurring	Recurring
Adam Ferrara	William "Needles" Nelson	New York City Fire Department (FDNY) Battalion Chief, 30th Battalion			Recurring	Recurring	Main	Main	Main
Larenz Tate	Bart "Black Sean" Johnston	New York City Fire Department (FDNY) Probationary Firefighter (later Firefighter, 1st Grade), Ladder Company 62 (62 Truck)				Recurring	Recurring	Main	Main

=== Recurring ===
Actor	Character Name	Character Role
Natalie Distler	Colleen Gavin Johnston	Tommy Gavin's daughter, Bart "Black Sean" Johnston's wife
Robert John Burke	Mickey "Mick" Gavin	Former Roman Catholic priest, Tommy Gavin's cousin
Lenny Clarke	Theodore "Teddy" Gavin	Retired FDNY Firefighter, Vietnam War veteran, Tommy Gavin's uncle
Michael Zegen	Damian Keefe	FDNY Probationary Firefighter, Ladder Company 62
Olivia Crocicchia	Katy Marie Gavin	Daughter of Tommy Gavin
Will Chase	Pat Mahoney	Retired FDNY Firefighter, (recurring Season 5 and 6)
Charles Durning	Michael Gavin	Tommy Gavin's Father, retired FDNY Firefighter (recurring Season 1–4)
Niels Jorgensen	Niels Jorgensen	FDNY Firefighter, 1st Grade, Ladder Company 62 (Ladder Company Chauffeur-LCC)
Trevor Heins	Connor Gavin	Tommy Gavin's Son (recurring Season 1–2)
Milena Govich	Barbara "Danielle"/"Candy" Callahan	Kenneth Shea's Ex-Wife, a former prostitute and porn star
Terry Serpico	Eddie Gavin	Tommy Gavin's Cousin, a Lawyer with the District Attorney's Office
Michael Mulheren	Ronald Perolli	FDNY 15th Battalion Chief, Battalion Commander
Ed Sullivan	Billy Warren	FDNY Firefighter, 1st Grade Ladder Company 62 (recurring Season 1)
Patti D'Arbanville	Ellie Gavin	Teddy Gavin's Wife (recurring Season 3–5)
Jerry Adler	Sidney Feinberg	FDNY 75th Battalion Chief (later Deputy Division Chief) (recurring Season 4–7)
Maura Tierney	Kelly McPhee	Tommy Gavin's Girlfriend (recurring Season 5–7)

== Production ==
In a 2008 interview on The Daily Show with Jon Stewart, Leary revealed season 5 had been delayed until March 2009 because of the 2007–08 Writers Guild of America strike, but all 22 episodes would air on consecutive weeks.

According to the L.A. Weekly, on December 1, 2008, during an appearance at Book Soup in West Hollywood, Leary revealed plot details for season 5, specifically a retrospective look into the events leading up to and surrounding 9/11 by each of the characters.

On June 16, 2009, the Los Angeles Times confirmed Rescue Me would return in 2010 for a ten-episode sixth season, due to increased ratings. Season 6 premiered Tuesday, June 29 at 10 p.m. A season 6 trailer was shown Tuesday, May 11, during FX's airing of Justified.

Framed fire-themed illustrations from Las Vegas firefighter Allan Albaitis (now retired) appeared in seven seasons of Rescue Me, generally visible on background walls of main characters and displayed in offices of fire HQs.

== Music ==
The main title theme song for Rescue Me is a shortened version of "C'mon C'mon" by The Von Bondies. That and several other songs were picked by Leary's son. The underscore and end title theme for the show were scored by composer Christopher Tyng, who also scored Leary's previous television series The Job.

Rescue Me often ends with a musical montage. The official soundtrack was released on May 30, 2006, on Nettwerk.

Michael Lombardi's band, Apache Stone, performed several times on the show, although they do not appear on the soundtrack.

== Reception ==
The show was well received when it premiered. The series premiere garnered Denis Leary and Peter Tolan an Emmy nomination for Outstanding Writing in a Drama Series. Tolan also received an Emmy nomination for Outstanding Directing in a Drama Series. Leary received another Emmy nomination the next year, this time for Outstanding Lead Actor in a Drama Series. Critics praised the show's willingness to take risks and talk about family, depression, alcoholism, homophobia, and the aftermath of the September 11, 2001, attacks.

The debut episode was seen by almost 4.1 million viewers, ranking #8 all-time for series premieres in basic cable. Seasons 1 and 2 averaged 2.7 and 2.8 million viewers, respectively.

Rescue Me received critical acclaim, scoring 86/100, 89/100, 90/100, 85/100, 84/100, 77/100 and 73/100 on Metacritic for seasons 1, 2, 3, 4, 5, 6, and 7, respectively.

=== Accolades ===
Wins

- 2005: Producers Guild of America Award for Visionary Award (Jim Serpico)
- 2005: Satellite Award for Best Ensemble, Television (Lenny Clarke, Charles Durning, Denis Leary, Michael Lombardi, James McCaffrey, Jack McGee, Steven Pasquale, Andrea Roth, John Scurti, Daniel Sunjata, Callie Thorne & Dean Winters)
- 2006: American Film Institute Award for TV Program of the Year (Rescue Me)
- 2007: Casting Society of America Award for Best Dramatic Episodic Casting (Julie Tucker)
- 2007: Gracie Allen Award for Outstanding Supporting Actress in a Drama Series (Marisa Tomei)
- 2009: Primetime Emmy Award for Outstanding Guest Actor in a Drama Series ("Sheila"; Michael J. Fox)
- 2011: Prism Award for Drama Series Multi-Episode Storyline—Substance Use (Rescue Me)
- 2012: Humanitas Prize Award for 60 Minute Category ("For Ashes"; Denis Leary & Peter Tolan)

Nominations

- 2004: Online Film & Television Association Award for Best Drama Series (Rescue Me)
- 2004: Online Film & Television Association Award for Best Actor in a Drama Series (Denis Leary)
- 2005: Golden Globe Award for Best Lead Actor in a Television Series, Drama (Denis Leary)
- 2005: Online Film & Television Association Award for Best Actor in a Drama Series (Denis Leary)
- 2005: Primetime Emmy Award for Outstanding Directing for a Drama Series ("Pilot"; Peter Tolan)
- 2005: Primetime Emmy Award for Outstanding Writing for a Drama Series ("Pilot"; Peter Tolan & Denis Leary)
- 2005: Satellite Award for Best Television Series, Drama (Rescue Me)
- 2005: Satellite Award for Best Actor in a Series, Drama (Denis Leary)
- 2005: Satellite Award for Best DVD Release of a Television Show (Complete First Season)
- 2005: Television Critics Association Award for Outstanding Achievement in Drama (Rescue Me)
- 2005: Television Critics Association Award for Outstanding New Program of the Year (Rescue Me)
- 2006: Primetime Emmy Award for Outstanding Lead Actor in a Drama Series ("Justice"; Denis Leary)
- 2006: Prism Award for Performance in a Drama Series Storyline (Denis Leary)
- 2006: Satellite Award for Best Television Series, Drama (Rescue Me)
- 2006: Satellite Award for Best Actor in a Series, Drama (Denis Leary)
- 2007: Motion Picture Sound Editors Award for Best Sound Editing in Sound Effects and Foley for Television - Short Form ("Devil"; Eileen Horta, Mark Cleary, James Bailey, Damien Smith, Kevin McCullough & Ashley Harvey)
- 2007: Primetime Emmy Award for Outstanding Lead Actor in a Drama Series ("Retards"; Denis Leary)
- 2007: Prism Award for Performance in a Drama Series Multi-Episode Storyline (Denis Leary)
- 2007: Satellite Award for Best Actor in a Series, Drama (Denis Leary)
- 2008: Primetime Emmy Award for Outstanding Guest Actor in a Drama Series ("Yaz"; Charles Durning)
- 2008: Primetime Emmy Award for Outstanding Cinematography ("Babyface"; Tom Houghton)
- 2008: Prism Award for Performance in a Drama Series Multi-Episode Storyline (Tatum O'Neal)
- 2009: Online Film & Television Association Award for Best Guest Actor in a Drama Series (Michael J. Fox)
- 2010: NAACP Image Award for Outstanding Supporting Actor in a Comedy Series (Larenz Tate)
- 2011: Hollywood Post Alliance Award for Outstanding Editing - Television ("Rescue Me: Vows"; Finnian Murray)
- 2012: Prism Award for Performance in a Drama Episode (Denis Leary)

== Home media ==
Sony Pictures Home Entertainment and DreamWorks Home Entertainment has released Rescue Me on DVD in Regions 1, 2, and 4. All seven seasons have been released in Region 1, seasons 1–3 in Regions 2 and 4. Season 3 was the only one to be released for the Blu-ray Disc by itself. Rescue Me: The Complete Series was released on DVD on September 25, 2012, with all seven seasons' 93 episodes in a 26-disc set. Mill Creek Entertainment released a box set with all seven seasons on Blu-ray on September 11, 2018.

In Australia, Region 4, Season 1 and 2 were released in 2006, three years later, season 3 was released in 2009, followed by Season 4 in 2010. No further individual seasons were released by Sony, however, 'The Complete Series' boxset was released in October 2012.

Via Vision Entertainment acquired the rights to the series and released 'The Complete Collection' in April 2020.

DVD title	Discs	Region 4
The Complete First Season	3	February 8, 2006
The Complete Second Season	4	September 26, 2006
The Complete Third Season	4	March 10, 2009
The Complete Fourth Season	4	July 18, 2010
The Complete Series	27	October 31, 2012
The Complete Collection	27	April 1, 2020
