= Peter Tolan =

American television director

- Born: Peter James Tolan III; July 5, 1958 (age 67); Scituate, Massachusetts, United States
- Occupation(s): Screenwriter, director, producer
- Years active: 1989–present
- Spouse: Leslie Tolan
- Children: 3

Peter James Tolan III (born July 5, 1958) is an American television producer, director, and screenwriter.

== Early life and career ==
Tolan was born in Scituate, Massachusetts, where he was a perennial favorite in the high school's dramatic productions. Before leaving to pursue a career in Hollywood, Tolan founded a theater group called YPST (Young People's Summer Theatre). The group performed Broadway musicals and rehearsed at a local church. Within three years, the group became so popular that a second production had to be added to accommodate the ever-increasing enrollment.

Tolan attended the University of Massachusetts Amherst for four years before dropping out to directly pursue theater. From college Tolan went to Minneapolis' Brave New Workshop (founded by improv great Dudley Riggs) at the suggestion of UMass employee Jim MacRostie, who had appeared at the Twin Cities institution during its early years. Riggs offered Tolan a job over the phone, but when Tolan arrived in Minneapolis several months later, he discovered that the job was that of janitor at the theater.

Within a year, Tolan became the musical director for the theater's touring company, and after that graduated to appearing as a member of the main stage cast. In the mid 80's, Tolan moved to New York City, where he and fellow writer-performer Linda Wallem formed a double act called Wallem & Tolan and began performing on the cabaret circuit in New York City at such venues as Don't Tell Mama, Eighty-Eights and Broadway Baby. Wallem and Tolan were known for their sketch work and for musical material (written by Tolan) that became the cornerstone of their act. After an extended run at the Manhattan Punch Line Theater, the act was mounted Off-Broadway at the Theater at St. Peter's Church in 1989. Titled Laughing Matters, the show was produced by Sanford Fisher and Zev Guber and directed by Broadway veteran Martin Charnin. For his work in the show, Tolan was named Outstanding Lyricist of a Broadway or Off-Broadway Show by the Burns Mantle Theater Yearbook 1988-1989 Best Plays.

== Television ==
Tolan began his career writing for short-lived sitcoms Carol & Company and Wish You Were Here. After writing for and co-producing the first six episodes of Home Improvement he began writing for the hit series Murphy Brown, a three-season tenure for which he would share an Emmy Award for Outstanding Comedy Series (1992, as co-producer). In 1992 Tolan began writing for the HBO program The Larry Sanders Show, for which he received, in his capacity as co-/executive producer, three CableACE Awards for Comedy Series and an Emmy for co-writing (with series lead Garry Shandling) the series finale "Flip".

After writing for several more programs (Ellen, Buddies, Good Advice), and creating the short-lived sitcoms Style & Substance and The George Wendt Show, Tolan co-created the ABC satiric comedy The Job with comedian Denis Leary, who would also star as an amoral and hedonistic NYPD detective. Though critically lauded, the series languished in the ratings and was canceled after two short seasons. Tolan went on to create the similarly short-lived sitcom Wednesday 9:30 (8:30 Central), a mid-season replacement about an idealistic television executive who joins a struggling network, that was canceled by ABC after only five episodes aired. In 2004, however, Tolan found success with the FX drama Rescue Me which he produced under his The Cloudland Company banner. Again, he worked with co-creator Denis Leary as New York City firefighter Tommy Gavin, who bears many similarities to Leary's character from The Job. The series has been well received by both critics and audiences, garnering Emmy nominations for Tolan and Leary and averaging 2.7 and 2.8 million viewers for its first and second seasons, respectively. It ended in 2011 after seven seasons.

In February, 2013, Entertainment Weekly reported that "Tolan landed Greg Kinnear to play a defense lawyer with 'zero filter'" on a Fox Broadcasting Company television program entitled Rake. Tolan has also produced pilots with comedian Jim Gaffigan and another based on the Israeli series Bilti Hafich through Fedora Entertainment, the production company he started with partners Michael Wimer and Leslie Tolan.

== Film ==
Tolan has also found success in film, having written the hit comedy Analyze This and its sequel Analyze That as well as the films My Fellow Americans, Bedazzled, America's Sweethearts, Guess Who and Just Like Heaven. In 2008, Tolan made his directorial debut with Finding Amanda, a semi-autobiographical film starring Matthew Broderick and Brittany Snow.

== Personal life ==
Tolan is married to editor Leslie Tolan. They have three children; sons Peter John and Benjamin Mark, and daughter Beatrice Grace. He later came out as gay, but it is unclear if he remains married to Leslie.

== Filmography ==
- Carol and Company (1990) (TV)
- Wish You Were Here (1990) (TV)
- Home Improvement (1991) (TV)
- Murphy Brown (1991–1993) (TV)
- The Larry Sanders Show (1992–1998) (TV)
- Good Advice (1994) (TV)
- The George Wendt Show (1995) (TV)
- Buddies (1996) (TV)
- My Fellow Americans (with E. Jack Kaplan and Richard Chapman) (1996)
- Ellen (1997) (TV)
- The Dave Chappelle Project (1998) (TV)
- Style & Substance (1998) (TV)
- Analyze This (with Harold Ramis and Kenneth Lonergan) (1999)
- What Planet Are You From? (with Garry Shandling, Michael J. Leeson and Ed Solomon) (2000)
- Bedazzled (with Harold Ramis and Larry Gelbart) (2000)
- America's Sweethearts (with Billy Crystal) (2001)
- The Job (2001–2002) (TV) (also co-creator, with Denis Leary)
- My Adventures in Television (2002) (TV)
- Stealing Harvard (with Martin Hynes) (2002)
- Analyze That (with Harold Ramis and Peter Steinfeld) (2002)
- Phil at the Gate (with Phil Hendrie) (2003) (TV)
- Rescue Me (2004–2011) (TV) (also co-creator, with Denis Leary)
- Guess Who (with David Ronn and Jay Scherick) (2005)
- Just Like Heaven (with Leslie Dixon) (2005)
- Fort Pit (2007) (TV)
- Finding Amanda (2008)
- The End of Steve (2008) (TV)
- Council of Dads (2011) (TV pilot)
- Rake (2014) (TV)
- The Jim Gaffigan Show (2015–2016) (TV)
- Outsiders (2016–2017) (TV)
- Guess Who Died (with Norman Lear) (2018) (TV)
- Mad About You (2019) (TV)
- Belated (2022) (TV - 1 episode)
