= Burn (2012 film) =

Film by Tom Putnam and Brenna Sanchez

BURN: One Year on the Frontlines of the Battle to Save Detroit
- Film poster
- Directed by: Tom Putnam; Brenna Sanchez
- Produced by: Tom Putnam; Brenna Sanchez
- Cinematography: Mark Eaton
- Edited by: Kevin Jones; Morgan Stiff; Miranda Yousef
- Music by: BC Smith; Alessandro Cortini
- Production companies: TBVE Films; Apostle
- Release date: April 21, 2012 (Tribeca Film Festival)
- Running time: 86 minutes
- Country: United States
- Language: English

BURN: One Year on the Frontlines of the Battle to Save Detroit is a 2012 American documentary film, produced and directed by Tom Putnam and Brenna Sanchez. It focuses on Engine Company 50 of the Detroit Fire Department, and the city of Detroit as it faces an economic collapse and rising arson and fire rates. The film was executive produced by Denis Leary and Jim Serpico through their production company, Apostle, as well as Steve Tihanyi and Morgan Neville. A sequel titled Burn X was released in 2022.

== Synopsis ==
The film follows the firefighters of Engine Company 50 of the Detroit Fire Department over the course of a year as they struggle with the highest arson rate in the country, and a lack of funding from the city of Detroit as it approaches bankruptcy. It highlights 3 specific individuals involved with the Detroit Fire Department.

Dave Parnell is a 33-year veteran firefighter, living in the same neighborhood as Engine 50. The film shows Parnell's last year on the job, approaching retirement as he turns 60 years old, and coming to terms with the death of his ailing, longtime wife, Gloria. He acts as the elder philosopher of the firehouse, spouting wisdom on life, firefighting, love, and the current state of Detroit.

Brendan "Doogie" Milewski, is a straight-shooting, adventurous, 11-year firefighter who becomes paralyzed after a wall crashes down on him while fighting a fire. Newly married, Doogie must adjust to life outside of the fire department, and life as a paraplegic.

After spending 30 years with the Los Angeles Fire Department, Detroit-native Don Austin is hired as Detroit Fire Department's new commissioner facing the task of rehabilitating and revitalizing the organization. He must lead the Department despite Detroit's financial crisis and the growing rate of arson in the city's abandoned buildings.

== Development ==
Putnam and Sanchez began work on the film after learning about the November 2008 death of Walter Harris, a Detroit firefighter who was killed while fighting a blaze in a vacated home. Wondering why firefighters would risk their lives to save an abandoned building in a city that has 80,000 abandoned structures, Putnam and Sanchez began investigating the state of the Detroit Fire Department. They began shooting with Engine 50 in August 2009.

Putnam and Sanchez started asking for corporate donors and taking tax-deductible online donations. General Motors made a donation in December 2010 to start filming while fundraising continued. Over the next 13 months, until January 2012, the film crew was embedded with the firefighters. With the exception of two of its Directors of Photography, BURN employed exclusively local crew.

Denis Leary and Jim Serpico (Rescue Me) joined as BURN's executive producers in 2011.

== Release ==
The film premiered at the 2012 Tribeca Film Festival where it won the Audience Award.

== Distribution ==
Despite an overwhelmingly positive response at the 2012 Tribeca Film Festival, the film was unable to secure a buyer for distribution. Putnam and Sanchez decided to self-distribute and release BURN by renting out movie theaters in 35 cities across the United States and embarking on a multi-city tour. These screenings were promoted as industry screenings, targeted at local firefighting companies.

Distributor Area 23a began booking the film into AMC Theatres, though Putnam and Sanchez decided to continue self-distribution after seeing a large difference in profits between the AMC screenings and their own screenings.

In Spring 2013, BURN played in 170 cities across the United States in four-walled screenings.

== Reception ==
On the review aggregator website Rotten Tomatoes, 100% of 17 critics' reviews are positive, with an average rating of 7.9/10. Metacritic, which uses a weighted average, assigned the film a score of 82 out of 100, based on four critics, indicating "universal acclaim".

The Washington Post called it "An emotional character study of a group of heroic, yet very human, individuals."

== Home media ==
BURN was released on DVD and Blu-ray Disc on June 18, 2013.

== Synopsis ==
A sequel titled Burn X (sometimes referred to as Detroit Burning) was released in 2022, serving as an update regarding the subjects of the initial film. It follows the events from the beginning of the Burn story through the COVID-19 pandemic.
