= Sirens (2014 TV series) =

2014 American television series

- Genre: Comedy
- Based on: Sirens (Channel 4) by Brian Fillis and Brian Kellett
- Developed by: Denis Leary; Bob Fisher
- Starring: Michael Mosley; Kevin Daniels; Kevin Bigley; Jessica McNamee; Bill Nunn; Josh Segarra
- Opening theme: "Again I Ride" by Tree Adams
- Composer: Tree Adams
- Country of origin: United States
- Original language: English
- No. of seasons: 2
- No. of episodes: 23

Production
- Executive producers: Bob Fisher; Denis Leary; Jim Serpico; David Aukin; David Leach; Hal Vogel; Victor Nelli Jr.
- Producer: Barry M. Berg
- Cinematography: William R. Nielsen, Jr.
- Editors: Steve Edwards; Sheri Bylander; William Henry; Kyle Gilman; John Murray
- Camera setup: Single-camera
- Running time: 22 minutes
- Production companies: Middletown News; Apostle; Fox 21 Television Studios (Note: Credited as Fox Television Studios for first season)

Original release
- Network: USA Network
- Release: March 6, 2014 – April 14, 2015

Related
- Sirens (UK)

Sirens is an American comedy television series loosely based on the British series of the same name. The American version was adapted by actor Denis Leary and screenwriter Bob Fisher. The series aired for two seasons on USA Network from March 6, 2014, through April 14, 2015. On April 22, 2015, USA cancelled Sirens after two seasons.

== Overview ==
The series follows the workday of three Emergency Medical Technicians with a fictional Chicago private ambulance company, named Eminent, and the unusual situations—often crude or humorous—people in need of their assistance are in.

== Cast ==
=== Main ===
- Michael Mosley as Johnny "Mousse" Farrell: a Chicago paramedic whose fear of commitment contributes to an on-again/off-again relationship with Theresa
- Kevin Daniels as Henry Isaiah "Hank" St. Clare: Johnny's openly gay paramedic partner and lifelong friend
- Kevin Bigley as Brian Czyk: a new paramedic recruit
- Jessica McNamee as Theresa Kelly: a Chicago police patrol officer and Johnny's on-again/off-again girlfriend
- Bill Nunn as "Cash" (season 2, recurring previously), a Vietnam veteran EMT who enjoys Twix and had his name legally changed to Cassius Clay
- Josh Segarra as Billy Cepeda (season 2, recurring previously): Theresa's police officer partner

=== Recurring ===
- Kelly O'Sullivan as Valentina "Voodoo" Dunacci: an asexual EMT
- Maura Kidwell as Claire "Stats" Bender: an obsessive-compulsive EMT
- Kirsten Fitzgerald as Kathy "Mac" McMenimen: Day Shift Supervisor

== Production ==
In June 2011, it was announced that Denis Leary and Bob Fisher were developing an adaptation of the 2011 British comedy-drama Sirens, created by Brian Fillis and inspired by Tom Reynolds's book, Blood, Sweat & Tea about the London Ambulance Service. Leary stated that he would not star in the series, but would take a small role, if necessary, in the future. In 2012, the USA Network sought to rush the developing Sirens to pilot status. However, a deal with Fox Television Studios was carefully being studied over VOD rights. The network was able to order a series pilot in June 2012.

The four lead roles were filled in October 2012, with the casting of Michael Mosley, Kevin Daniels, Kevin Bigley and Jessica McNamee. Production for the pilot began in Chicago that month. The network announced that Sirens would premiere in the first quarter of 2014 and would later state that two back-to-back episodes would air together on March 6, 2014, then resume normal programming the following week.

At the January 2014 TCA conference, Leary and Fisher stated that the producers of the British series approached Leary's business partner, Jim Serpico, and asked him to adapt it for the U.S.. Leary stated, "We really liked those guys, and USA [network] was pillaging the cast of [the recently ended] Rescue Me and putting them into shows." He added, "we can make some money off these USA people."

On June 11, 2014, USA ordered a 13-episode second season of Sirens.

== Episodes ==
=== Season 1 (2014) ===
No.	Title	Directed by	Written by	Original release date	Prod. code	U.S. viewers (millions)
1	"Pilot"	Victor Nelli, Jr.	Denis Leary & Bob Fisher	March 6, 2014	BDZ179	1.33
It is Brian's first day in the ambulance. Johnny meets Theresa for the first time since their relationship break. Hank and the crew discuss their emergency contacts.
2	"A Bitch Named Karma"	Michael Blieden	Denis Leary & Bob Fisher	March 6, 2014	BDZ101	1.00
The crew gets called to a lightning strike at a church picnic. After discussing karma, they volunteer to teach CPR to kids, only to later be given Chicago Bears tickets for the exact same day.
3	"Rachel McAdams Topless"	John Fortenberry	Jim Serpico & Tom Sellitti	March 13, 2014	BDZ104	1.08
The guys are asked by a married patient to clear his browser history on his computer. They find he visited a bestiality website and cannot get what they see out of their minds. Meanwhile, Johnny remembers that Theresa has his iPad, which contains porn sites he visited.
4	"Famous Last Words"	Michael Blieden	Denis Leary & Bob Fisher	March 20, 2014	BDZ102	1.11
A patient resembling Johnny's estranged father dies and Hank forces his friend to reconcile, which could make things right in life. Meanwhile, Brian wants to find out who the woman is that the dead guy mentioned in his last words, after realizing it is not the man's wife.
5	"Alcohol Related Injury"	John Fortenberry	Denis Leary & Bob Fisher	March 27, 2014	BDZ103	1.22
Johnny and Theresa agree to no-strings casual sex, even though he feels used and wants something more. Brian gets to perform an item from his bucket list.
6	"The Finger"	Jason Ensler	Spencer Sloan	April 3, 2014	BDZ105	1.14
Brian attempts to woo the asexual Voodoo. Hank invites Cash to dinner with his mother (Loretta Devine) with surprising results. Johnny and Theresa spend the day with Johnny's dad and his newly-introduced little brother.
7	"Till Jeff Do Us Part"	Jason Ensler	Erik Durbin	April 10, 2014	BDZ106	0.87
Hank gets invited to Jeff the Chef's wedding with Alejandro. Theresa has trouble with a wedding guest. Brian learns a new skill.
8	"Itsy Bitsy Spider"	Steven Tsuchida	Ken Rogerson	April 17, 2014	BDZ108	1.27
Hank's fear of spiders is revealed. Brian meets his suicidal doppelgänger. Johnny's practical jokes on everyone get turned around on him.
9	"There's No 'I' in Cream"	Steven Tsuchida	Josh Lieb	April 24, 2014	BDZ107	1.09
The EMTs recall strange events for potential new recruits. Meanwhile, Johnny tries to figure out who ate most of the expensive donuts he brought to the station.
10	"Shotgun Wedding"	Richie Keen	Erik Durbin	May 1, 2014	BDZ109	1.15
When Theresa gets wounded in a shoot-out, she makes a long-term career decision to apply for the FBI. Not having much of a plan of his own, Johnny proposes marriage to her. She foresees an extremely long engagement, so he suggests doing it that day.

=== Season 2 (2015) ===
No.	Title	Directed by	Written by	Original release date	Prod. code	U.S. viewers (millions)
11	"Superdick"	Jay Karas	Erik Durbin	January 27, 2015	BDZ204	0.930
In the Season 2 premiere, Johnny finds a perfect apartment to share with Theresa thanks to a landlord with a nut allergy. In other events, Brian struggles with his platonic love affair with Voodoo; Billy begins dating Theresa's sister; and Hank wonders if he'll ever find love.
12	"Johnny Nightingale"	Michael Blieden	Erik Durbin	January 27, 2015	BDZ202	0.800
Johnny deals with an overly grateful patient; and Brian agrees to take an injured young woman to her prom.
13	"Briandipity"	Michael Blieden	Spencer Sloan	February 3, 2015	BDZ201	0.750
The guys contemplate fate and serendipity after several random, but fortuitous, incidents; and Johnny becomes upset with Theresa when he learns that she doubts destiny brought them together.
14	"Transcendual"	Richie Keen	Annabel Oakes	February 3, 2015	BDZ209	0.750
Johnny and Hank are given free passes to a health club after treating a gym rat; and Voodoo tests Brian's ability to remain in a sexless relationship.
15	"All the Single Ladies"	Richie Keen	Annabel Oakes	February 10, 2015	BDZ205	0.840
Johnny and Hank ride along on Brian's first night shift.
16	"Screw the One Percent"	Richie Keen	Mark Blecha	February 24, 2015	BDZ206	0.780
Johnny has issues when Hank starts dating Johnny's landlord; and Billy helps a heartbroken Brian after Voodoo dumps him for a guy she met on an asexual message board.
17	"Let Pythons Be Pythons"	John Embom	Sarah Walker	March 3, 2015	BDZ207	0.760
The guys encounter a python wrapped around a woman's neck and Theresa makes time for a sample sale.
18	"Hypocritical Oath"	Jay Karas	Sarah Walker	March 10, 2015	BDZ203	0.580
The guys save the life of a notorious member of the mafia.
19	"Charbroiled"	John Enbom	Ken Rogerson	March 17, 2015	BDZ208	0.776
The hangover from a drunken brawl between Cubs and Sox fans threatens a family barbecue.
20	"Balls"	Bob Fisher	Spencer Sloan	March 24, 2015	BDZ213	0.742
Johnny, Theresa, Billy and Maeve begin playing tennis together; Cash helps Hank shop for his mother's birthday present; and Brian fills in for Cash and rides with Voodoo and Stats.
21	"Six Feet Over/Under"	Richie Keen	Denis Leary & Bob Fisher	March 31, 2015	BDZ210	0.593
Johnny and his mom deal with his dad's slipping into a coma in very different ways: He tries to repay an old debt while she places bets on what time her former husband will die. In other events, the guys can't rid themselves of an unfortunate earworm.
22	"No Love"	Steve Pink	Erik Durbin	April 7, 2015	BDZ212	0.756
After observing the respect that Theresa receives on the job, Johnny gets the guys to revive an old program in order to get a little respect for EMTs.
23	"Sub-Primal Fears"	Steve Pink	Annabel Oakes	April 14, 2015	BDZ211	0.719
In the Season 2 finale, the guys treat a man who fears hospitals. In other events, Brian confronts his fear of moving out; and Johnny has a fear realized when Billy temporarily moves in with him and Theresa.

== Critical reception ==
Sirens scored 61 out of 100 on Metacritic based on 19 "generally favorable" reviews. On another review aggregator site, Rotten Tomatoes, it holds a 56% rating, based on 32 reviews.
