= Ibn Hamdis =

Sicilian Arab poet

- ابن حمديس الصقلي
- Born: Abu Muhammad Abd al-Jabbar ibn Abi Bakr ibn Muhammad ibn Hamdis al-Azdi al-Siqilli; 1056; Syracuse or Noto, Sicily
- Died: 1133 (aged 76–77); Bijāya
- Occupation: Poet
- Writing career
- Language: Arabic
- Notable work: Diwan (collection of poetry)

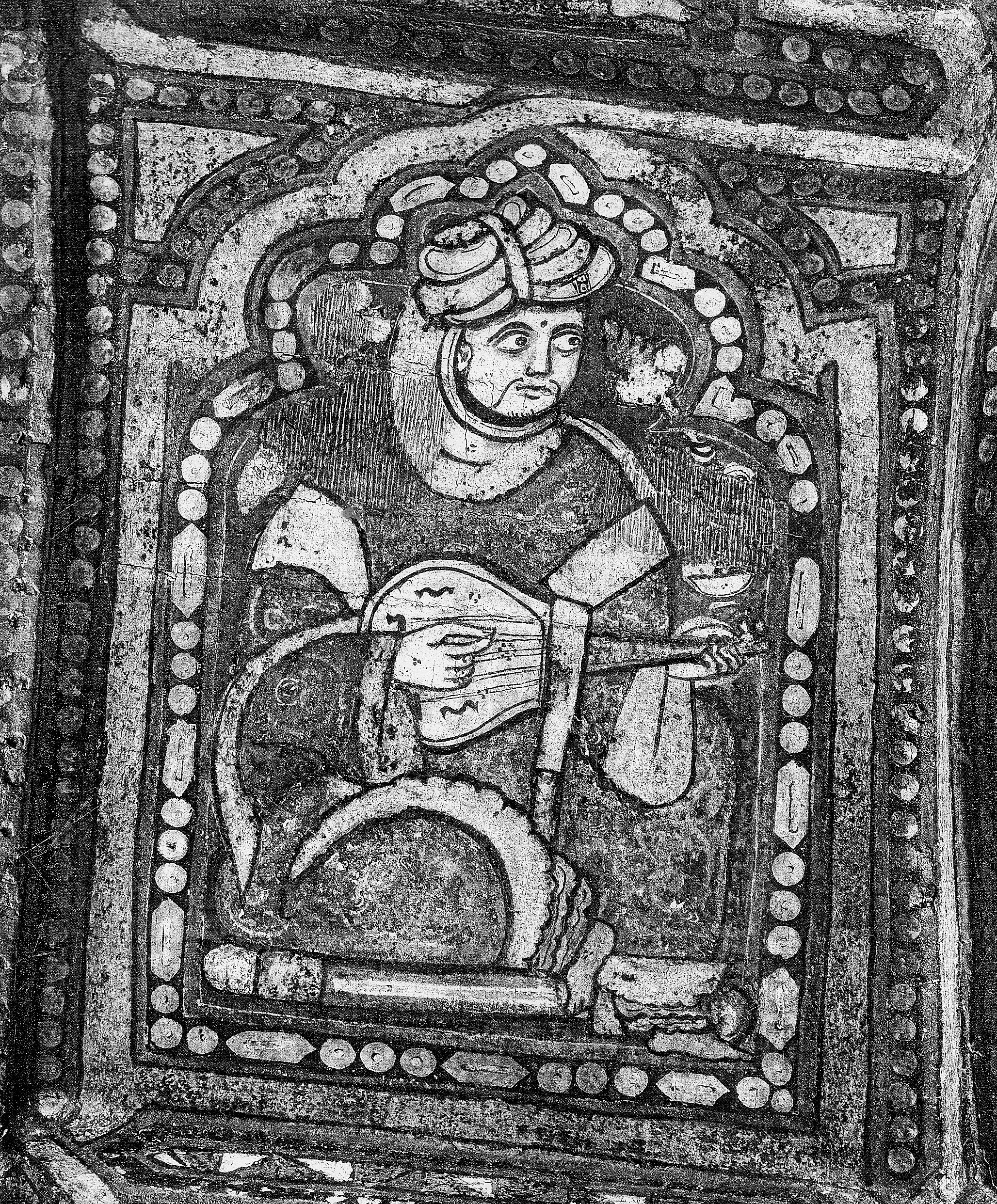
A 12th century representation (Cappella Palatina) of a Muslim (Saracen) musician-poet at the Norman court in Palermo, Sicily

Ibn Ḥamdīs al-ʾAzdī al-Ṣīqillī (Arabic: ابن حمديس الصقلي; c. 1056 – c. 1133) was a Sicilian Arab poet.

== Biography ==
Ibn Hamdis was born in Syracuse, south eastern Sicily, around 447 AH (1056 AD). Little is known of his youth, which can be reconstructed only through a literal reading of scattered verses in his dīwān. His poetry displays a thorough mastery of the Arabic poetic canon, as well as a sophisticated linguistic knowledge, which points to an elite education. It is probable that Ibn Hamdis was raised in a prosperous family, likely landed gentry, who settled the Val di Noto early after the Muslim conquest of Sicily in the 9th century. Ibn Hamdis enjoyed the benefits and reaped the fruits of such privileged upbringing.

But the prosperity of the Muslims of Sicily was not to last. In the second half of the 11th century the political stability of Muslim Sicily had been severely compromised by decades of internecine struggle. The Kalbid court of Palermo and its ephemeral splendour had long been effaced by squabbles between contender warlords, who had partitioned the island into three fiefdoms. The Normans were taking advantage of this political weakness, and advancing steadily in their conquest of the island. Ibn Hamdis was about five years old when the Norman armies, aided and abetted by the Sicilian Arab warlord Ibn al-Thumna, disembarked at Messina and moved westward to Palermo. When the city fell in 1072, the hopes for a revival of Muslim sovereignty on the island began to wane, and a diaspora of Muslim Sicilians began.

Ibn Hamdis, like so many others, set sail with his wife and sons to North Africa, to reach some of his relatives in Sfax. Not long after, the poet travelled again to al-Andalus, attracted by al-Mu'tamid ibn Abbad's reputation as a generous patron of the arts. Ibn Hamdis made his way to Seville and was received by al-Mu'tamid, who admitted the young poet to his entourage of panegyrists. The poet spent thirteen years in al-Andalus, participating in the political events that involved the taifa kingdoms; the Christian onslaught coming from the North, and the looming Almoravid conquest. In 1091, Ibn Hamdis witnessed, together with the dismayed population of Seville, the arrest and deportation of his patron and friend al-Mu'tamid to North Africa. Also in 1091, as the Andalusian taifas fell to Yusuf ibn Tashufin’s armies, Sicily fell irremediably to the Normans, who, in that year, completed their conquest of the island. The new lords of al-Andalus, the Almoravids (from the Arabic al-murābiṭūn, or "inhabitants of monasteries") were suspicious of poetry and other urban refinements, deemed religiously reproachable.

Ibn Hamdis elected to leave again. After a perilous sea-journey, in which his boat was shipwrecked, causing his beloved slave-girl, Jawhara, to drown (to her he devoted some of his finest elegies), the poet settled once again in North Africa. He found new patrons at the Zirid court of Mahdiya, in modern-day Tunis. There he eulogized the Zirids Tamim ibn al-Mu'izz (1062–1108), Yahya ibn Tamim (1108–1131), Ali ibn Yahya (1115–1121) and the latter's son al-Hasan ibn Ali (1121–1152). He also praised the Hammadid al-Mansur ibn al-Nasir at Bijaya (modern-day Algeria) although his exact movements between the two courts are not clear. According to Hajji Khalifa's Kashf al-ẓunūn ʾan asāmī al-kutub wa-al-funūn, Ibn Hamdis died in 527 AH (1132/33 AD), aged seventy-seven, in Mallorca (to the amir of the island he dedicated two panegyrics). New evidence from the dīwān of the poet, however, attests to the fact that he did not die in Mallorca, but in Bijāya (modern-day Béjaïa, Algeria) and that he was over eighty years old.

The Sicilian scholar Ibn Zafar (died c. 1169) states that Ibn Hamdis compiled his dīwān by his own hand. Two manuscript copies of the dīwān are extant and were both used by ʾIḥsān ʿAbbās to establish his edition (Beirut 1960). The first copy is kept at the Vatican Library, Rome (447). The second is preserved in the Asiatic Museum in Saint Petersburg (294). Other scattered poems by Ibn Hamdis are found in Ibn Bassam's Dhakhīra fī Maḥāsin ʾAhl al-Jazīra. Some of these poems are taken directly from the dīwān, others are unique, while others still are variant readings which differ from the dīwān.

== Ibn Hamdis's influence in today's culture ==
Forgotten for much of the 20th century, Ibn Hamdis is mentioned by Leonardo Sciascia in the 1969 article Sicily and Sicilitudine, included in the collection La corda pazza. Since the 1990s there has been a revaluation in Italy (More specifically in Sicily) of the work of Ibn Ḥamdīs Arabism, and more generally of Arab culture in Sicily. This also inspired Italian poets and musicians. In the work of the Sicilian poet Sebastiano Burgaretta the influence of Ibn Ḥamdīs is clear. And to the great Arab-Sicilian poet, Burgaretta dedicated an intense lyric in Sicilian language, then winner of the Vann'antò Saitta Prize.

In 2007, in Sicily, the Zagara and Rais events and, under the patronage of the Sicilian Region by Antonino Reitano, Sicilian Arabic Poetry intended to honor the Arab poets of Sicily.

The musical ensemble Milagro acoustic has dedicated three albums to the poetry of the Arab poets of Sicily and in particular to Ibn Hamdis: Arab Poets of Sicily (2005 Compagnia Nuove Indye), SIQILIAH land of Islam – Arab travelers and poets of Sicily (2007 Compagnia Nuove Indye) and ARAB SICILY (2013 Cultural Bridge Indie label).

In 2008 the Catania singer Etta Scollo, with the collaboration of Professor Corrao, curator of the collection Arab Poets of Sicily and together with other artists of the Ensamble group, organized on the poetics of Ibn Ḥamdīs, and other Arab poets of Sicily, the show Il Fiore Splendente, which was also very successful in Germany

In 2011 the Sicilian musician Franco Battiato set to music some works by Ibn Hamdis in a musical project entitled Diwan: The Essence of the Real, in order to celebrate Sicily's Islamic richness of its cultural roots.

In 2025, Sicilian singer-songwriter Carmen Consoli recorded La Terra di Hamdis (Hamdis' land), feat. Mahmood, included in her album Amuri Luci. The song is inspired to the life and works of Ibn Hamdis and the lyrics are in Sicilian.
