= Sex & Drugs & Rock & Roll (TV series) =

American musical comedy television series

- Genre: Musical comedy
- Created by: Denis Leary
- Starring: Denis Leary; John Corbett; Elizabeth Gillies; Robert Kelly; John Ales; Elaine Hendrix
- Opening theme: "Sex & Drugs & Rock & Roll" by Denis Leary
- Country of origin: United States
- Original language: English
- No. of seasons: 2
- No. of episodes: 20

Production
- Executive producers: Jim Serpico; Denis Leary
- Cinematography: William R. Nielsen Jr.; Christopher LaVasseur
- Editors: Elizabeth Merrick; Kyle Gilman; William Henry
- Camera setup: Single-camera
- Running time: 21–26 minutes
- Production companies: Apostle; Fox 21 Television Studios; FXP (Note: Credited as FX Productions for first season)

Original release
- Network: FX
- Release: July 16, 2015 – September 1, 2016

Sex & Drugs & Rock & Roll (sometimes stylized as Sex&Drugs&Rock&Roll) is an American musical comedy television series created by and starring Denis Leary. The series aired on FX for a total of 20 episodes from July 16, 2015, to September 1, 2016. Following the end of the second season, FX canceled the show.

== Premise ==
Fifty-year-old Johnny Rock was once the lead singer of The Heathens, a rising rock band from the late 1980s and early 1990s that broke up following the release of only one album, mainly due to Johnny's life of excess. Twenty-one years later, Johnny struggles to survive in the music industry. He is given a second chance, however, when he learns that he has a 21-year-old daughter named Gigi with one of his former back up singers. Gigi moves to New York to try to make it as a musician. She comes up with a proposition: if her dad reforms The Heathens, she will replace him as lead singer, the band will change their name to The Assassins, and in return he will stay on board as lead songwriter for the band, as well as coach to Gigi. Johnny experiences the challenges of an aging rock star in a music landscape fueled by hip-hop and pop, as well as caring for someone other than himself for once with his newly found daughter now in his life.

== Cast ==
=== Main ===
- Denis Leary as Johnny Rock, the former lead singer of the band 'The Heathens'
- John Corbett as Josiah 'Flash' Bacon, the former Heathens' guitarist. Until the formation of The Assassins, he had a regular gig playing for Lady Gaga
- Elizabeth Gillies as Gigi Rock, the lead singer of The Assassins and Johnny's daughter
- Robert Kelly as Hector 'Bam Bam' Jimenez, the former Heathens drummer and now The Assassins' drummer
- Elaine Hendrix as Ava Delany, the former Heathens backup singer, Johnny's longtime live-in girlfriend, and his moral compass
- John Ales as Sonny 'Rehab' Silverstien, the former Heathens' bassist and now The Assassins' bassist

=== Recurring ===
- Josh Pais as Ira Feinbaum (season 1), The Heathens' former manager and the first manager of The Assassins
- Callie Thorne as Cat Zakarian, a back up singer for The Heathens and Gigi's mother
- Eric Sheffer Stevens as Brook Lanley (season 2), a hip rock producer
- Rebecca Naomi Jones as Davvy O'Dell (season 2), a downtown singer
- Mark Gessner as Noah Perkins (season 2), The Assassins' new manager

== Episodes ==
Season	Episodes	Originally released	
Season	Episodes	First released	Last released
1	10	July 16, 2015	September 17, 2015
2	10	June 30, 2016	September 1, 2016

=== Season 1 (2015) ===
No. overall	No. in season	Title	Directed by	Written by	Original release date	US viewers (millions)
1	1	"Don't Wanna Die Anonymous"	Michael Blieden	Denis Leary	July 16, 2015	0.87
Johnny sees a girl staring at him in a bar and walks up to kiss her, only to learn (after being slapped in the face and kneed in the balls) that she is his daughter Gigi, which he never knew he had. On the verge of being dropped by his agent, Ira, Johnny mulls over his last remaining options as a singer: the Bryan Adams tribute band "Summer of '69" or another one called "Jon Non Jovi". But things take a different turn when Gigi, an aspiring singer, offers $200,000 for Johnny and his former Heathens' guitarist Flash to write some songs for her. The only problem is that Johnny and Flash are not on speaking terms, each blaming the other for breaking up the band back in 1990, while Flash also hints at attempting to sleep with Gigi. The group gets together at the end just to see if Gigi is as good as she says or if she is just bluffing for their attention. The band plays their former hit song "Animal" and both Johnny and Ira are impressed by Gigi's singing as they realize their new opportunity to get back into showbiz. Songs featured: "Sex&Drugs&Rock&Roll" (featuring Denis Leary); "Animal" (featuring Elizabeth Gillies)
2	2	"Clean Rockin' Daddy"	Michael Blieden	Denis Leary	July 23, 2015	0.70
Johnny signs a contract with Gigi, stating that she is the lead singer and he is a songwriter, agreeing to write five songs within the next two months. Rehab and Bam Bam have already signed the contract. Flash has also signed it, but says it is not for the money as he is already successful enough. After a night of drugs and drinking, which he spent in the studio before passing out, Johnny offers the basic riff and melody for a song. Flash adds a hook and helps with the lyrics. The test run with Gigi singing the new song "Die Tryin'" goes well, and the band starts rehearsing and recording the song. With one song down and four to go, Johnny is blindsided by a sort of intervention held by the band members while the band's agent reveals a clause in the contract that stipulates Johnny must be sober, no drinking and definitely no drugs for at least 30 days. Johnny argues that "all the great ones" wrote their best stuff while under the influence, but the group still tries to keep him clean. When the next song he writes is awful, the group allows him to go back to drinking and drugs. Song featured: "Die Tryin'" by Elizabeth Gillies (featuring Denis Leary)
3	3	"Lust for Life"	Michael Blieden	Denis Leary	July 30, 2015	0.70
Gigi and Johnny try to write a song together but she gives up, saying that she is not a songwriter. Gigi asks Johnny if he loves her and they get into a small argument when he hesitates to answer her question. A website publishes a story that Johnny died from choking on a chicken bone, so Ira and the band decide to let the rumors circulate for a little while, as it would be good for Gigi's career. While trying to come up with creative stories for how Johnny "died", Johnny suggests he was killed by his partner Flash, with Bam Bam saying "like an assassination". This leads Gigi to decide that The Assassins would be a good name for her band. Joan Jett makes an appearance wishing Gigi good luck on her first gig, while also shining some light on Johnny's story that he once slept with her. She says they were both drunk, and that "he couldn't quite... perform." Both fell asleep, and she only told him that she had a great time to get him out of her house. Gigi sings the song that she and her father were writing at the beginning of the episode. Song featured: "New York 2015" by Elizabeth Gillies
4	4	"What You Like Is In The Limo"	Michael Blieden	Denis Leary	August 6, 2015	0.70
Following the Johnny Rock death hoax, The Heathens have a massive surge of interest in Belgium, so Ira books one last Heathens gig there called "The Johnny Rock Resurrection Tour". The plan is for Gigi to sing three songs at the concert to introduce The Assassins. Gigi and Johnny have some father–daughter bonding time over music and being a rockstar. Flash and Gigi go out for lunch, where Flash proposes that the two should write music together and exclude Johnny, with the excuse that Johnny is holding Gigi back and will surely self-destruct at the gig. The group gets into a fight over the "rock star treatment" they want behind the scenes during the gig, making ridiculous requests. Gigi is upset by the stupidity of their requests, but the group still ends up with everything they want. During the gig, Johnny opens with "Die Tryin'", but halfway through the song, the drugs and booze kick in, he hallucinates a snake, and freaks out, leaving the stage empty and awkward. Gigi uses the moment to introduce The Assassins, continuing the song and taking over the gig. After the gig, the group sits in the limo where Flash and Ira attempt to drive Johnny out of "Team Assassins", but they are overruled in a power play by Gigi, leaving Flash shocked as he realizes that Gigi has just out-maneuvered him. Song featured: "Die Tryin'" by Elizabeth Gillies (featuring Denis Leary)
5	5	"Doctor Doctor"	Denis Leary	Denis Leary	August 13, 2015	0.51
Noting how dysfunctional the band is, Gigi urges all the band members to see a therapist (Griffin Dunne) who has worked with other bands, including Aerosmith and Kings of Leon. Although the group and individual sessions go horribly bad, it strangely becomes a bonding experience. At the end, Ava insists the band cannot work as a democracy. It needs to be a dictatorship—with Gigi taking charge.
6	6	"Tattoo You"	Michael Blieden	Evan Reilly	August 20, 2015	0.43
Gigi shows Johnny a tattoo on her arm that contains his name, and she suggests Johnny get one with her name to cement his love and commitment to her. Johnny initially refuses, saying he's always been afraid of getting a tattoo, but eventually goes through with it. Gigi's mother, Cat, shows up in town to visit and share a song she wrote. Cat, who also had a past romance with Flash, tries to convince him that she is more "his speed" than Gigi is. Just when Gigi starts to think that things will not work out with Flash, he drops his pants and reveals a tattoo he got of her name. Meanwhile, Gigi's tattoo of Johnny's name starts to run, revealing it was only henna, which angers Johnny.
7	7	"Supercalifragilisticjuliefriggingandrews"	Michael Blieden	Denis Leary	August 27, 2015	0.76
Johnny's mother Elizabeth (Kelly Bishop), who has long insisted she would have won the lead role in Mary Poppins over Julie Andrews if she had not become pregnant with Johnny, guilt-trips him into having the band play at her wedding to Jeremy (Roger Bart), the gay producer of her upcoming off-Broadway musical. The band agrees to play at the wedding, as well as indulge Elizabeth's wish for a 1970s theme. As the band starts to play, however, Elizabeth tries to upstage them by singing songs from her own show. Song featured: "Put It on Me" by Elizabeth Gillies and Denis Leary
8	8	"Hard Out Here for a Pimp"	Denis Leary	Denis Leary	September 3, 2015	0.58
In an effort to steer Gigi away from Flash, Johnny sets her up with Ira's new client Jim Fillmore, who has started a musical and fashion movement called "NormCore". However, Jim turns out to be way too much like Johnny, so Johnny decides Flash is the lesser of two evils. Meanwhile, Rehab and Bam Bam are frustrated over the way the band's earnings are dispersed, and decide to start their own musical movement called "BeastCore".
9	9	"Take My Picture by the Pool"	Michael Blieden	Denis Leary & Jack Leary	September 10, 2015	0.39
Ira interrupts a band rehearsal to announce that Sony Records wants to sign Gigi, and is offering a $250,000 advance on her first recordings. The bad news is they only want Gigi and not the band, which means the end of The Assassins. Sony wants to keep Johnny and Flash on board as songwriters, leaving Bam Bam and Rehab no choice but to pursue their BeastCore project and become EDM DJs. Johnny, Flash and Ava are initially seduced by the trappings of fame and fortune, while Gigi is forced to wear skimpy outfits for her first video, which is a remake of the Assassins song "What's My Name" in a hip-hop style. During the taping sessions for the video, the producer tells Gigi that she will have to learn dance moves and lip sync all her concerts, causing her and Johnny to pull the plug. Song featured: "What's My Name?" by Elizabeth Gillies
10	10	"Because We're Legion"	Michael Blieden	Denis Leary	September 17, 2015	0.49
Gigi breaks up with Flash because of what occurred previously, and contacts Greg Dulli, a producer whom Johnny hates. The rep sent by Dulli, a man named J.P. (Rob Morrow), wants to record some songs, forcing Johnny and Flash to meet with Bam Bam and Rehab about rejoining the band. They agree on one condition: that they can retain the rights to the EDM version of "What's My Name" for use in a perfume commercial. Not taking it seriously, Johnny agrees. A conversation between Flash and Ava reveals they once slept together while she was with Johnny, and it is overheard by J.P. Manipulated by J.P., the band records a song titled "Complicated". Soon after, they see the commercial that features "What's My Name", and learn that it is for a feminine hygiene product, not perfume. Song featured: "Complicated" by Elizabeth Gillies

=== Season 2 (2016) ===
No. overall	No. in season	Title	Directed by	Written by	Original release date	US viewers (millions)
11	1	"All That Glitters is Gold"	Michael Blieden	Denis Leary & Bob Fisher	June 30, 2016	0.53
The group learns Micki Munson, a backup singer in The Heathens, died from an aneurysm at the age of 48. From her belongings, they find a video recording marked "Heathens" and all are excited to see some old footage of the band. Gigi, Johnny, Bam Bam and Rehab start watching the tape first and, right when the tape gets to a part with Ava and Flash performing together in Nashville that includes a passionate onstage kiss, Ava and Flash walk into the room. Both admit to the affair, leaving Johnny seething. Ava reminds Johnny of the affairs he had on her, but Johnny insists this is worse because she and Flash hid it from him. Bam Bam helps Johnny realize he needs to move on and live in the present. In the end, Johnny has custom maracas made with Micki's ashes inside, and he presents them to Ava. Song featured: "Ain't No Valentine" by Elizabeth Gillies
12	2	"Rebel Rebel"	Michael Blieden	Julieanne Smolinski	July 7, 2016	0.33
Trying to recapture some of her lost youth, Ava reveals to Johnny that she wants to have a threesome, but when the moment arrives, Johnny is pretty much left out. Ava also inspires Gigi to experiment with a lesbian fling, and she hooks up with sexy singer Davvy (Rebecca Naomi Jones). Meanwhile, Rehab learns from Noah (The Assassins' new manager) that there is actual interest in his script for a musical about the Great Famine of Ireland, which features 29 songs about potatoes.
13	3	"Cool for the Summer"	Jim Serpico	Denis Leary & Bob Fisher	July 14, 2016	0.56
Following Gigi's "experience", Flash tries to learn how to be a better kisser, while Ava suggests that Johnny could learn a thing or two about performing cunnilingus. Noah and a producer present Rehab with an offer for his musical about the Great Famine, but Rehab won't accept that the two want to ironically name the production "Feast". At The Assassins' next performance, Gigi prods Ava to sing lead on a song. After a timid start, Ava really gets into it and wows the crowd, prompting Gigi to insist that the band bring Ava out front on at least one song per show.
14	4	"Bad Blood"	Jim Serpico	Denis Leary & Bob Fisher	July 21, 2016	0.33
Following the buzz surrounding Ava's performance, The Assassins' management wants to give her a solo show as "Ava X". Johnny is initially part of the project, but his controlling nature causes Gigi and Ava to fire him. Gigi gives Flash a pin—a Rolling Stones tongue-and-lips logo encrusted with rubies and diamonds—as a gift, causing Flash to ponder what it means. Rehab and Bam Bam meet with Campbell Scott, who has purchased the rights to the stage production of Feast. He says that while Rehab's concept is great, the songs are awful. He further says the only thing he likes about the songs is Bam's drumming, so he plans to reimagine them as rap songs with a Celtic beat. Rehab gets up and leaves, but Bam stays.
15	5	"And She Was"	Michael Blieden	Julieanne Smolinski	July 28, 2016	0.42
As Ava prepares for her official debut performance as Ava X, Johnny is suddenly overly supportive, making Ava suspicious. Caught up in the hype over his role in Feast, Bam Bam takes on a sleek new persona, angering Rehab. Flash scares Gigi by showing her a plot of land in New Jersey that he hopes will be the site of their future home together.
16	6	"Rock This Bitch Till the Wheels Fall Off"	Michael Blieden	Denis Leary & Bob Fisher	August 4, 2016	0.38
With new Ava X shows lined up, Flash helps Ava with hair and wardrobe, drawing the two close together again. Rehab is drawn back into Feast, after Campbell Scott gives him a special gift.
17	7	"Tramps Like Us"	Jim Serpico	Erik Durbin	August 11, 2016	0.35
At a songwriting session, Ava and Flash agree that their recent sexual encounter was a one-time thing to get "closure" from 20 years earlier, and that it cannot happen again. However, things change when Ava sees Flash's land in New Jersey and gets way more excited over it than Gigi did. The two have sex right on the property, and decide they want to be together. After they announce their intentions to Johnny and Gigi, Johnny takes it surprisingly well but Gigi does not. Meanwhile, at the rehearsals for Feast, Rehab is bowled over upon seeing his vision on stage, but he soon becomes angry again when he sees his tiny credit on the promotional poster.
18	8	"Ghosts of Skibbereen"	Jim Serpico	Denis Leary & Bob Fisher & Jack Leary	August 18, 2016	0.35
For the two weeks leading up to the Feast premiere, Campbell Scott insists that everyone, including Rehab and Bam Bam, get into character by only eating what was available to the Irish during the Great Famine (grass, tree bark, pine nuts, etc.). Gigi and Johnny attempt to move on from Flash and Ava. Gigi gets back together with Davvy, while Davvy sets up Johnny with her 26-year old friend. Gigi and Johnny attempt to rub their new relationships in the faces of Flash and Ava, but it backfires. Feast has a successful opening night.
19	9	"Rolling in the Deep"	Rosemary Rodriguez	Evan Reilly	August 25, 2016	0.48
Gigi's mother Cat returns, and starts writing songs with Johnny as well as sleeping with him. Cat later offers a song for Ava to perform at a solo gig, making Flash think that Cat's only motive for coming back to New York is to cash in on Gigi's and Ava's budding fame. Meanwhile, Rehab tells Bam Bam that the rights to Feast have been resold from Campbell Scott to Michael Flatley, and Bam later learns that Rehab was in on it. While The Assassins try to channel their anger into their next live performance, the infighting takes over. Song featured: "So Many Miles" by Elizabeth Gillies
20	10	"Bang Bang"	Rosemary Rodriguez	Evan Reilly	September 1, 2016	0.45
Cat shows Johnny and Gigi the music video she had made for The Assassins' latest song, and both notice that only Gigi is featured while no one from the band appears. Cat then reveals she thinks Gigi's career can explode if she is backed by a younger, hipper band. After cajoling Gigi and bribing Johnny with sex, Cat ultimately gets them to agree. They break the news to The Assassins, leaving the band to pursue the Ava X solo project with only one original song in their catalogue. Soon after, Ava does some research and finds that Cat's house in Ohio was foreclosed and that Cat is flat broke. As Flash suspected earlier, Cat came to town to cash in on Gigi, but Johnny does not seem to care. Song featured: "Bang Bang" by Elizabeth Gillies

== Development ==
In January 2014, FX Networks announced that it would air Sex & Drugs & Rock & Roll, a rock-and-roll themed comedy starring Denis Leary, "in the near future". Leary was the head writer and one of the executive producers. In a subsequent interview, Leary said he had come up with the idea for the show because, having met well-known bands such as Aerosmith and The Cars, he had also been interested in the bands that had not been successful.

John Corbett was cast as Flash on March 7, 2014, followed by Robert Kelly as Bam Bam and Elizabeth Gillies as Gigi on March 14. Prior to being cast, Corbett had been a professional guitarist who performed with his band; by contrast, Kelly said that he did not know how to play the drums when he was cast. In casting Gillies as Gigi, Leary said he had been looking for someone who could sing songs emotionally and was "able to act, do comedy, improvise and be sexy enough to be believable as a lead singer". Elaine Hendrix was cast as Ava later in March 2014. John Ales was cast as Rehab, the band's bassist, despite not knowing how to play the bass. The show also includes guest appearances from performers such as Joan Jett.

At the end of June 2014, FX ordered a ten-episode first season of Sex & Drugs & Rock & Roll. Fox Television Studios and FX co-produced the show, which was filmed in New York City. In September 2015, the network renewed the show for a second season, which premiered on June 30, 2016. Leary said of the second season: "We all sort of have multiple mid-life crises happening at the same time". On September 9, 2016, following the end of the second season, FX canceled the show.

== Soundtracks ==
=== Season 1 ===
Sex & Drugs & Rock & Roll (Songs from the FX Original Comedy Series)

Soundtrack album by various artists
- Released: September 10, 2015
- Recorded: 2015
- Genres: Soundtrack, Rock
- Length: 59:01
- Label: FX Networks

Sex & Drugs & Rock & Roll chronology
Sex & Drugs & Rock & Roll (Songs from the FX Original Comedy Series) (2015)	Sex & Drugs & Rock & Roll (Songs from the FX Original Comedy Series) Season 2 (2016)

Sex & Drugs & Rock & Roll (Songs from the FX Original Comedy Series) is the soundtrack album for the first season of the TV series. The album was released on September 10, 2015.

Eight songs from the album were released as promotional singles; "Animal" (on July 16, 2015), "Desire" and "New York 2015" (on July 30, 2015), "Die Trying" (on August 6, 2015), "Put It on Me" (on August 27, 2015), "What's My Name" (on September 10, 2015), and "Complicated" (on September 17, 2015).

No.	Title	Recording artist(s)	Length
1.	"Sex & Drugs & Rock & Roll"	Denis Leary	3:03
2.	"Animal"	Elizabeth Gillies	2:46
3.	"Die Trying"	Denis Leary	3:08
4.	"Radiohead Meets Morrissey"	Denis Leary	0:41
5.	"Bloody English Whores" (An Gorta Mor Movement #2)	Chris Phillips	1:08
6.	"Sinner's Gold"	Denis Leary	1:10
7.	"Éire and Ire" (An Gorta Mor Movement #23)	Chris Phillips	1:13
8.	"New York 2015"	Elizabeth Gillies	3:56
9.	"Desire"	Elizabeth Gillies	3:13
10.	"Sinner Baby"	Denis Leary	2:40
11.	"Die Trying"	Elizabeth Gillies	3:14
12.	"F**k the Queen (Of England)"	John Ales	1:03
13.	"Baby It's Late"	Callie Thorne	4:04
14.	"Johnny Cash Said"	Denis Leary	2:15
15.	"Put It On Me"	Denis Leary, Elizabeth Gillies	2:39
16.	"Baby Get Down"	Elizabeth Gillies, Elaine Hendrix	3:19
17.	"One Old Broad"	Kelly Bishop	3:00
18.	"Fire and Gasoline"	Chris Phillips	3:04
19.	"Beastcore"	John Ales, Robert Kelly	0:57
20.	"What's My Name"	Elizabeth Gillies	3:04
21.	"Sex Bomb"	Elizabeth Gillies	1:32
22.	"Complicated"	Elizabeth Gillies	4:16
23.	"What's My Name" (EDM Remix)	Elizabeth Gillies	3:36
Total length:			59:01

=== Season 2 ===
Sex & Drugs & Rock & Roll (Songs from the FX Original Comedy Series) Season 2

Soundtrack album by various artists
- Released: September 1, 2016
- Recorded: 2016
- Genres: Soundtrack, Rock
- Length: 44:47
- Label: FX Networks

Sex & Drugs & Rock & Roll chronology
Sex & Drugs & Rock & Roll (Songs from the FX Original Comedy Series) (2015)	Sex & Drugs & Rock & Roll (Songs from the FX Original Comedy Series) Season 2 (2016)

Sex & Drugs & Rock & Roll (Songs from the FX Original Comedy Series) Season 2 is the soundtrack album for the second season of the TV series. The album was released on September 1, 2016.

Six songs from the album were released as promotional singles; "Ain't No Valentine" (on June 30, 2016), "Don't Break Me Too" (on July 14, 2016), "Just Let Me Go" (on July 28, 2016), "Raise a Hand" (on August 4, 2016), and "Already in Love" and "So Many Miles" (on August 25, 2016).

No.	Title	Recording artist(s)	Length
1.	"Ain't No Valentine"	Elizabeth Gillies	2:56
2.	"Dream Tonight"	Liza Colby	3:09
3.	"Go Funk Yourself"	Rebecca Naomi Jones	0:46
4.	"Liar"	Rebecca Naomi Jones	2:44
5.	"Dive In"	Elizabeth Gillies & Rebecca Naomi Jones	1:13
6.	"Don't Break Me Too"	Elizabeth Gillies	3:25
7.	"Hush"	Liza Colby	2:32
8.	"U2 Meets Coldplay"	Denis Leary	0:54
9.	"Just Let Me Go"	Elizabeth Gillies	2:46
10.	"Raise a Hand"	Elizabeth Gillies	2:43
11.	"The British Heel"	Feast	2:39
12.	"The Famine & the Feast"	Feast	1:11
13.	"Ghouls"	Feast	2:00
14.	"Ghosts of Skibbereen"	Feast	1:32
15.	"Goodbye/A Moment Like This"	Feast	2:23
16.	"What's a Man to Do"	Campbell Scott	1:47
17.	"Already in Love"	Elizabeth Gillies	3:02
18.	"So Many Miles"	Elizabeth Gillies	3:35
19.	"Over"	Denis Leary	3:26
Total length:			45:01

== Critical reception ==
The first season of Sex&Drugs&Rock&Roll received mixed reviews. The review aggregate website Rotten Tomatoes gave the first season a rating of 59%, based on 46 reviews, with an average rating of 5.66/10. On Metacritic, which assigns a normalized rating, the series has a score of 60 out of 100, based on 32 critics, indicating "mixed or average reviews". Variety magazine summarized Sex & Drugs & Rock & Roll as "a great title, a good premise and a just-OK show", particularly praising the show's "smaller moments". While Linda Holmes of NPR praised Leary's performance and the quality of the script, she believed the show's premise to be cliched. Willa Paskin wrote for Slate magazine that the show's premise was heavily influenced by Leary's personal perception of rock music. Noel Murray of The A.V. Club wrote that the first season's episodes were not particularly eventful, other than the pilot, but that nonetheless "the series has a certain scrappy charm".

On Rotten Tomatoes, the second season has a rating of 63%, based on 8 reviews, with an average rating of 4.80/10. Tim Goodman of The Hollywood Reporter wrote that, whereas season 1 had been a light-hearted comedy, the series "felt a little deeper, a little more like a family" in season 2. Goodman particularly praised Gillies's comic timing, the dynamic between Leary and Corbett, the development of Hendrix's character, and the character development of Kelly's and Ales's characters during season 2. Conversely, Verne Gay of Newsday saw season 2 as a "letdown", saying: "The song remains the same—all lies and jest (still, a TV star hears what he wants to hear and disregards the rest)".
