= Touchstone Television =

Defunct American television production company

- Final logo, used in 2020
- Formerly: Fox 21 Television Studios (2014–2020)
- Type: Subsidiary
- Industry: Television production
- Predecessors: Fox Lab; Fox Television Studios; Foxstar Productions; Fox World; Fox 21
- Founded: December 4, 2014; 11 years ago
- Founder: David Madden
- Defunct: December 1, 2020; 5 years ago
- Fate: Dissolved, operations folded into 20th Television
- Successors: 20th Television (absorbed); Searchlight Television (spin-off)
- Key people: Bert Salke (president)
- Parent: 20th Century Fox Television (2014–2019); Disney Television Studios (2019–2020)

The second incarnation of Touchstone Television, formerly known as Fox 21 Television Studios, was an American television production company and a subsidiary of the Disney Television Studios, a subsidiary of the Disney Media Networks business segment of the Walt Disney Company. It was founded on December 4, 2014 from the merger of Fox Television Studios and Fox 21 and given its second name in mid-2020 following the acquisition of 21st Century Fox by Disney.

On December 1, 2020, Disney announced that the label was folded into 20th Television.

== Predecessors ==
=== Fox Television Studios ===
Fox Television Studios, Inc.
- Logo used from 1997 to 2014
- Industry: Television production
- Predecessors: Foxstar Productions (1993–2005); Fox World (2000–2014)
- Founded: August 1, 1997; 29 years ago
- Defunct: December 4, 2014; 11 years ago
- Fate: Merged with Fox 21 to form Fox 21 Television Studios
- Successor: Fox 21 Television Studios
- Headquarters: Los Angeles, California, United States
- Parent: Fox Entertainment Group

Fox Television Studios, Inc. was a television production subsidiary of Fox Entertainment Group, the flagship entertainment division of 21st Century Fox, the unofficial production arm of Fox and the secondary production arm of 20th Century Fox Television, which is itself the television arm of 20th Century Fox Film Corporation, as well as being considered the "de facto" production arm of Fox; Fox Television Studios was considered Fox's secondary production arm. Fox Television Studios (FTVS) was formed on August 1, 1997, alongside 20th Century Fox Television and 20th Television under executive David Grant. The studio was created to house smaller production units, starting with the Greenblatt-Janollari Studio (G-JS). Greenblatt-Janollari started producing shows in the 1998–1999 season with 3 comedy series for ABC and CBS. While funded by Fox, G-JS was presented as an "independent mini-studio". The studio also partnered with David Gerber and his Gerber Company venture to produce various telemovies and television series. With Fox Entertainment Group holding a 20% stake in New Regency Production's parent corporation, Fox Studios formed a joint venture, Regency Television, by 2000, managed by Gail Berman. Another production unit formed was Fox Television Studios Productions (FTSP) under Lisa Berger. Early output by the individual units, or "pods", were FTSP's Son of the Beach for FX, The Hughleys by G-JS and Regency had Malcolm in the Middle.

The pod model evolved into five divisions: alternative, scripted, international, Fox World and Regency Television:

- The alternative division was responsible for Talkshow with Spike Feresten and The Wanda Sykes Show, along with E!'s The Girls Next Door franchise. In mid-2002, Fox Alternative Productions was formed by Fox TV Studios and headed by David Martin with its first show to be "The Coach".
- The scripted division produced The Shield, along with a number of television films and miniseries.
- Fox World division, formed in 2000, produced international versions of its reality television programs such as Joe Millionaire and Temptation Island. The company was shut down by FTVS in 2014.

In March 2005, Fox Television Studios expanded their international division into the UK television market by acquiring British independent production company Scream Films following the departure of Fox World's UK division boss Jonathan Glazier who had left to join New Zealand production company Touchdown Television (now known as Warner Bros. International Television Production New Zealand), marking Fox Television Studios first British acquisition with Scream Films continued to operate as a standalone unit within Fox Television Studios who will work with the acquired company to develop FTVS's formats in both the UK and the US. One year later in July 2006, Fox Television Studios rebranded their acquired British production company Scream Films as their UK division renaming to Fox Television Studios UK, however another year later in June 2007, Fox Television Studios announced their shuttering of its UK division Fox Television Studios UK following Fox Television Studios's major restructure under its then-new president Emiliano Calemzuk with Fox Television Studios will continue to developed unscripted series for the US, UK and internationally.

Eventually the only division operating was the scripted unit. Next FTVS attempted international co-productions of direct-to-series broadcast series. The company had a hit with Burn Notice on USA Network. In August 2010, Dave Madden was appointed to head the unit, where he evenly increased its production slates until he was appointed as president of entertainment for Fox Broadcasting in August 2014.

=== Fox Television Studios International ===
This is about the company that exists according to the News Corporation page

Fox Television Studios International
- Industry: Television production
- Founded: August 1, 2000; 26 years ago
- Defunct: March 7, 2001; 25 years ago
- Fate: Folded into Fox World
- Successors: Fox World
- Headquarters: Los Angeles, California, United States
- Owner: News Corporation
- Parent: Fox Entertainment Group

Fox Television Studios International was the international division of Fox Television Studios that operated from August 1, 2000 to March 7, 2001. Daniella Welteke was tapped up to head the division, which was eventually folded into Fox World.

The pod model evolved into five divisions: alternative, scripted, international, Fox World and Regency Television:

- The alternative division was responsible for Talkshow with Spike Feresten and The Wanda Sykes Show, along with E!'s The Girls Next Door franchise. In mid-2002, Fox Alternative Productions was formed by Fox TV Studios and headed by David Martin with its first show to be "The Coach".
- The scripted division produced The Shield, along with a number of television films and miniseries.
- Fox World division, formed in 2000, produced international versions of its reality television programs such as Joe Millionaire and Temptation Island. The company was shut down by FTVS in 2014.

Eventually the only division operating was the scripted unit. Next FTVS attempted international co-productions of direct-to-series broadcast series. The company had a hit with Burn Notice on USA Network. In August 2010, Dave Madden was appointed to head the unit, where he evenly increased its production slates until he was appointed as president of entertainment for Fox Broadcasting in August 2014.

=== Fox World ===
Fox World
- Type: Division
- Industry: Reality television
- Predecessor: Fox Television Studios International (2000–2001)
- Founded: 1996; 30 years ago
- Defunct: 2006; 20 years ago
- Fate: Folded into Fox Television Studios
- Successor: Fox Television Studios (then Fox 21 Television Studios, later Touchstone Television and finally folded into 20th Television)
- Owner: Fox Entertainment Group
- Parent: Fox Television Studios

Fox World (formerly Fox Television Studios International) was a television production company formed in 1996 as a division of Fox Television Studios (FTVS). The company produced international versions of its reality television programs such as Joe Millionaire and Temptation Island.

On March 5, 2001, SBS agreed a deal/joint venture with Fox World to launch a northern European-based production company.

On November 22, 2004, Hayley Babcock was named senior vice president of production at the Fox World studio, while Daniella Welteke would remain as head of the division.

=== Fox Lab ===
Fox Lab
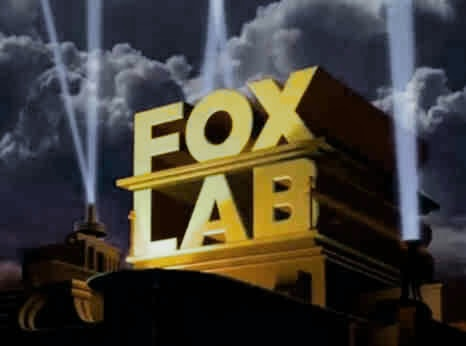
- Type: Division
- Founded: 1995; 31 years ago
- Defunct: 2003; 23 years ago
- Owner: News Corporation
- Parent: 20th Television (Fox Entertainment Group)

Fox Lab was a low-profile production sub-division of 20th Television, originally formed in 1986 as Fox Television Stations Productions (or FTSP) and was responsible for the development of A Current Affair, Cops and America's Most Wanted. It is a successor to Metromedia Producers Corporation and its in-house video subsidiary, Metromedia Video Productions. The company, similar to its predecessor Metromedia, had also financed its own shows, including a syndicated revival of the ABC sitcom 9 to 5 that lasted from 1986 to 1988, and Harry and the Hendersons, airing from 1991 to 1993.

It was rebranded to the current moniker in 1995, although the FTSP label was continued to be used on several older shows until Fox's cancellation of Cops in 2013.

In 1990, Fox Television Stations debuted a soap opera, Tribes, only shown on Fox owned-and-operated stations. It only lasted one season on the air.

By the early 90s, the company was producing a show, Not Just News, for first-run syndication. Also, in 1994, Fox Television Stations Productions produced an international version of America's Most Wanted, Manhunter, to be shown throughout international networks. It was later evolved into a US version for syndication, America's Most Wanted: Final Justice.

In 2003, Fox Lab was producing the syndicated show Classmates, that lasted only two seasons.

Fox Lab's library is currently co-owned by The Walt Disney Company and Fox Corporation.

Title	Years	Network	Notes
Manhunter	1994–1995	international syndication	co-produced with Straight Shooter Productions
What's So Funny?	1995	FOX	co-production with Funny Business, LLC
America's Most Wanted: Final Justice	1995–1996	Syndication	Syndicated edit downs of previously taped AMW episodes. co-produced with Straight Shooter Productions
Classmates	2003	Syndication	

=== Foxstar Productions ===
Foxstar Productions was a division of Fox Television Studios.

=== The original incarnation of Touchstone Television ===
The original iteration of Touchstone Television was a television production company founded in 1985 as a division of Disney's subsidiary Touchstone Pictures. It is nowadays known as ABC Signature (since 2020), and was known as ABC Studios since 2007.

=== Fox 21 ===
Fox 21
- Type: Subsidiary
- Industry: Television Production
- Founded: 2004; 22 years ago
- Defunct: December 4, 2014; 11 years ago
- Fate: Merged with Fox Television Studios to form Fox 21 Television Studios
- Products: Television programs
- Parent: 20th Century Fox

Fox 21 (styled fox21.) was a low-cost scripted and reality cable television production arm of 20th Century Fox, which was a division of the Fox Entertainment Group, part of Rupert Murdoch's 21st Century Fox. The company productions included the FX series Sons of Anarchy, Terriers and Tyrant, the A&E action series Breakout Kings, The CW reality series Beauty and the Geek, the Showtime series Homeland, the Comedy Central series Brickleberry, the WGN America series Salem and the Lifetime series Witches of East End. On December 4, 2014, Fox Television Studios merged with Fox 21 to form Fox 21 Television Studios.

Fox 21 was formed in 2004 by 20th Century Fox Television executives Dana Walden and Gary Newman to develop and back smaller-budgeted but unique and daring shows. Fox 21's first executive was Jane Leisner. The unit's early hits were the FX series Sons of Anarchy and The CW reality series Beauty and the Geek.

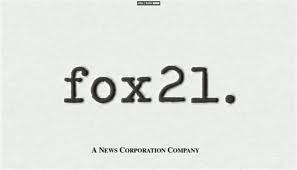
On screen logo used from 2005 to 2014. The News Corporation byline was removed in 2013.

After originally being passed over for programming the new network, MyNetworkTV, Fox 21 was in consideration along with Twentieth Television and independent producers as of December 2006 in a potential reprogramming from telenovela to low-cost reality and game shows.

Bert Salke, who moved from his Brancato/Salke production company based at ABC Studios, took charge of the unit in 2010 and led an increase in show productions starting with the Showtime series Homeland. In early 2015, Mythology Entertainment signed a first look deal with the company and its sister studio 20th Century Fox Television while announcing the head of its TV division.

The company produces or had produced the FX series Terriers, Tyrant, Sons of Anarchy, Mayans MC, The Americans and The Bastard Executioner, the A&E action series Breakout Kings, the Showtime series The Chi, the Hulu series Chance, the Comedy Central series Brickleberry, the WGN America series Salem and the Lifetime series Witches of East End.

== History ==
Logo used from 2014 to 2020

It was announced in December 2014 that Fox 21 and Fox Television Studios would merge into Fox 21 Television Studios. This situation came as a result of FTVS's president David Madden being promoted to Fox Broadcasting Company and the fact that both units were focusing on the same market, cable television. The combined operation is headed by Fox 21 president Bert Salke.

In January 2020, Fox 21 reached a first-look deal with Marta Kauffman's studio Okay Goodnight, beginning with an adaptation of the 2019 novel The Dreamers. In early-February 2020, it reached a first-look deal with the Gotham Group.

On August 10, 2020, as part of a reorganization of Walt Disney Television following the acquisition of 21st Century Fox by Disney, the studio was renamed Touchstone Television — reviving a brand dormant since the previous Touchstone Television was renamed ABC Studios in 2007. ABC Studios had also merged with the previous iteration of ABC Signature Studios to form the ABC Signature. The renamed Touchstone Television studio retained a typewriter-styled logo similar to the previous Fox 21 and Fox 21 Television Studios brandings. The first and only production under the name was the Hulu film Books of Blood.

Less than four months following this change, on December 1, 2020, Walt Disney Television head Dana Walden announced a further reorganization which will see the newly renamed division wound up, with Salke transitioning to an overall producing deal with Disney Television Studios, and remaining operations absorbed into 20th Television.

== Filmography ==
=== Television series and film ===
Title	Genre	First air date	Last air date	No. of seasons	Network	Production company(s)	Notes
Fox Television Studios (1997–2014)
The Hughleys	Sitcom	September 22, 1998	May 20, 2002	4	ABC (seasons 1-2); UPN (seasons 3-4)	The Greenblatt/Janollari Studio and Willowick Entertainment	
Maggie Winters	Sitcom	September 30, 1998	February 3, 1999	1	CBS	The Greenblatt/Janollari Studio and CBS Productions	
To Have & to Hold	Drama	September 30, 1998	December 9, 1998	1	CBS	The Greenblatt/Janollari Studio and CBS Productions	
Fast Food Films	Variety show	March 6, 1999	September 28, 1999	1	FX	Gold Coast Television Entertainment	
The X Show	Magazine series	May 31, 1999	April 2001	2	FX	Mindless Entertainment	
Oh, Grow Up	Sitcom	September 22, 1999	December 28, 1999	1	ABC	The Greenblatt/Janollari Studio	
Ryan Caulfield: Year One	Sitcom	October 15, 1999	October 22, 1999	1	Fox	Mandeville Films and Regency Television	
Malcolm in the Middle	Sitcom	January 9, 2000	May 14, 2006	7	Fox	Satin City and Regency Television	
Son of the Beach	Sitcom	March 14, 2000	October 1, 2002	3	FX	The Howard Stern Production Company and Loch Lomond Entertainment	
Soul Food: The Series	Drama	June 28, 2000	May 26, 2004	5	Showtime	Water Walk Productions, Edmonds Entertainment, State Street Pictures, 20th Century Fox Television, Showtime Networks and Paramount Network Television	Based on the 1997 film of the same name
Backstory	Documentary	August 12, 2000	January 20, 2005	5	AMC	Phometheus Entertainment, Van Ness Films and Foxstar Productions	
Murder in Small Town X	Reality	July 24, 2001	September 4, 2001	1	Fox	Hoosick Falls Productions	
Beat the Geeks	Game show	November 7, 2001	October 7, 2002	2	Comedy Central	Mindless Entertainment	
The Shield	Police drama	March 12, 2002	November 25, 2008	7	FX	MiddKid Productions, Columbia TriStar Domestic Television and Sony Pictures Television	
John Doe	Science fiction	September 20, 2002	April 25, 2003	1	Fox	Camp-Thompson Productions and Regency Television	
The Grid	Thriller	July 19, 2004	August 9, 2004	1	TNT	Groveland Pictures and Carnival Films	Miniseries; aired on BBC Two in the UK
Listen Up	Sitcom	September 20, 2004	April 25, 2005	1	CBS	Regency Television and CBS Productions	Distributed in the US by CBS Media Ventures
Living with Fran	Sitcom	April 8, 2005	March 24, 2006	2	The WB	Fringe Producers, On Time and Sober, Jizzy Entertainment, Uh-Oh Productions and Regency Television	
The Girls Next Door	Reality	August 7, 2005	August 8, 2010	6	E!	Prometheus Entertainment and Alta Loma Entertainment	
Killer Instinct	Crime drama	September 23, 2005	December 2, 2005	1	Fox	Regency Television	
Cheerleader Nation	Reality	March 12, 2006	May 28, 2006	1	Lifetime	Swim Entertainment	
Thief	Crime drama	March 28, 2006	May 2, 2006	1	FX	Pariah Television, Sarabande Productions and Regency Television	miniseries
Windfall	Drama	June 8, 2006	August 31, 2006	1	NBC	Joyful Girl Productions and Regency Television	
Celebrity Duets	Reality	August 29, 2006	September 29, 2006	1	Fox	SYCOtv, Michael Levitt Productions and A. Smith & Co. Productions	
The Riches	Drama	March 12, 2007	April 29, 2008	2	FX	Maverick Television and FX Productions	
Burn Notice	Action	June 28, 2007	September 12, 2013	7	USA	Flying Glass of Milk Productions, Fuse Entertainment and Fabrik Entertainment	
Saving Grace	Fantasy	July 23, 2007	June 21, 2010	4	TNT	Grand Productions and Paid My Dues Productions	
Crowned: The Mother of All Pageants	Reality	December 13, 2007	January 30, 2008	1	The CW	Swim Entertainment	
The Return of Jezebel James	Sitcom	March 14, 2008	March 21, 2008	1	Fox	Dorothy Parker Drank Here Productions and Regency Television	
Mental	Medical drama	May 26, 2009	August 14, 2009	1	Fox	Kedzie Productions and Infinity Pictures	
Kendra	Reality	June 7, 2009	November 20, 2011	4	E!	Prometheus Entertainment and Alta Loma Entertainment	
Defying Gravity	Science fiction	August 2, 2009	October 23, 2009	1	ABC	Parriott/Edelstein Productions and Omni Film Productions	aired on CTV in Canada
White Collar	Crime drama	October 23, 2009	December 18, 2014	6	USA	Jeff Eastin & Warrior George Productions	
The Wanda Sykes Show	Talk show	November 7, 2009	April 24, 2010	1	Fox	Sykes Entertainment, Inc.	
Holly's World	Reality	December 6, 2009	April 3, 2011	2	E!	Prometheus Entertainment and Alta Loma Entertainment	
The Good Guys	Police dramedy	May 19, 2010	December 10, 2010	1	Fox	Flying Glass of Milk Productions and Fuse Entertainment	
Persons Unknown	Mystery	June 7, 2010	August 28, 2010	1	NBC	Invisible Ink and Televisa S.A. de C.V.	
The Gates	Supernatural drama	June 20, 2010	September 19, 2010	1	ABC	Little Engine Productions and Summerland Entertainment	
The Glades	Crime drama	July 11, 2010	August 26, 2013	4	A&E	Innuendo Productions and Grand Productions	
Lights Out	Drama	January 11, 2011	April 5, 2011	1	FX	A Warren Leight Production, Fineman Entertainment and FX Productions	
The Killing	Crime drama	April 3, 2011	August 1, 2014	4	AMC (Seasons 1-3); Netflix (Season 4)	KMF Films, Fuse Entertainment and Fabrik Entertainment	
In the Flow with Affion Crockett	Sketch comedy	August 14, 2011	September 11, 2011	1	Fox	Foxx/King Entertainment and Tantamount Studios	
The Great Escape	Reality	June 24, 2012	August 26, 2012	1	TNT	Profiles Television Productions, The Hochberg Ebersol Company and Imagine Television	
The Americans	Espionage	January 30, 2013	May 30, 2018	6	FX	Nemo Films, Amblin Television and FX Productions	
Maron	Sitcom	May 3, 2013	July 13, 2016	4	IFC	Boomer Lives! Productions and Apostle	
Graceland	Action	June 6, 2013	September 17, 2015	3	USA	Jeff Eastin & Warrior George Productions	
Sirens	Sitcom	March 6, 2014	April 14, 2015	2	USA	Middletown News and Apostle	based on the British series of the same name
Life Flight: Trauma Center Houston	Reality	February 16, 2015	March 16, 2015	1	Lifetime	The Boardwalk Entertainment Group	
Fox 21 (2004–2014)
Beauty and the Geek	Reality	June 1, 2005	May 13, 2008	5	The WB (seasons 1–2); The CW (seasons 3–5)	Katalyst Films and 3 Ball Productions	
Free Ride	Sitcom	March 1, 2006	April 9, 2006	1	Fox	Rob Roy Thomas Productions and Wild Jams Productions	
Saved	Medical drama	June 12, 2006	September 4, 2006	1	TNT	Sarabande Productions, Brightline Pictures and Imagine Television	
Anchorwoman	Reality	August 22, 2007		1	Fox	The 6 Group	
Sons of Anarchy	Crime drama	September 3, 2008	December 9, 2014	7	FX	Linson The Company, Sutter Ink and FX Productions	
Game Show in My Head	Game show	January 3, 2009	January 24, 2009	1	CBS	Hat Trick Productions and Katalyst Films	
Terriers	Dramedy	September 8, 2010	December 1, 2010	1	FX	MiddKid Productions and Rickshaw Productions	
Breakout Kings	Crime drama	March 6, 2011	April 29, 2012	2	A&E	Matt Olmstead Productions, Blackjack Films, and Chernin Entertainment	
Homeland	Thriller	October 2, 2011	April 26, 2020	8	Showtime	Teakwood Lane Productions, Cherry Pie Productions, Keshet Media Group and Showtime Networks	
Brickleberry	Animated sitcom	September 25, 2012	April 14, 2015	3	Comedy Central	Damn! Show Productions and Black Heart Productions	
Witches of East End	Fantasy	October 6, 2013	October 5, 2014	2	Lifetime	3 Arts Entertainment and Curly Girly Productions	
Those Who Kill	Crime drama	March 3, 2014	May 18, 2014	1	A&E (Episodes 1-2); Lifetime Movie Network (Episodes 3-10)	One Two One Three Pictures, Miso Film, and Imagine Television	
Salem	Horror	April 20, 2014	January 25, 2017	3	WGN America	Beetlecod Productions and Prospect Park	
Tyrant	Political drama	June 24, 2014	September 7, 2016	3	FX	Teakwood Lane Productions, Keshet Media Group and FX Productions	
Rush	Medical drama	July 17, 2014	September 18, 2014	1	USA	Little Engine Productions, Fancy Films and Pine City Entertainment	
Legends	Crime drama	August 13, 2014	December 28, 2015	2	TNT	Paperboy Productions and Teakwood Lane Productions	
Fox 21 Television Studios (2014–2020)
The Comedians	Sitcom	April 9, 2015	June 25, 2015	1	FX	Jennilind Productions, Larry Charles Projects, Tamaroa Productions, Flying Glass of Milk Productions, Fabrik Entertainment and FX Productions	
Complications	Drama	June 18, 2015	August 13, 2015	1	USA	Flying Glass of Milk Productions	
Sex & Drugs & Rock & Roll	Dramedy	July 16, 2015	September 1, 2016	2	FX	Apostle and FX Productions	
The Bastard Executioner	Historical drama	September 15, 2015	November 17, 2015	1	FX	Sutter Ink, Imagine Television and FX Productions	
Damien	Horror	March 7, 2016	May 9, 2016	1	A&E	44 Strong Productions and Fineman Entertainment	based on The Omen
Dice	Sitcom	April 10, 2016	October 8, 2017	2	Showtime	Olé Productions, American Work Inc. and Showtime Networks	
Chance	Psychological thriller	October 19, 2016	November 29, 2017	2	Hulu	Nutmegger, Kem Nunn Stories, Inc., and Groundswell Productions	
Seven Seconds	Crime drama	February 23, 2018		1	Netflix	KMF Films, Bender Brown Productions, and Filmtribe	Limited series
Fosse/Verdon	Biographical drama	April 9, 2019	May 28, 2019	1	FX	5000 Broadway Productions and FX Productions	Limited series
The Politician	Political dramedy	September 27, 2019	June 19, 2020	2	Netflix	Prospect Films, Brad Falchuk Teley-Vision and Ryan Murphy Television	
Soundtrack	Musical drama	December 18, 2019		1	Netflix	Annapurna Television, Random Acts Productions and 20th Century Fox Television	
The Stranger	Thriller	April 13, 2020	April 27, 2020	1	Quibi	KMF Films	
Barkskins	Drama	May 25, 2020	June 15, 2020	1	National Geographic	Elwood Reid Inc.	
Tales from the Loop	Science fiction	April 3, 2020		1	Amazon Prime Video	Amazon Studios, 6th & Idaho and Indio	
Ratched	Psychological thriller	September 18, 2020		1	Netflix	The Saul Zaentz Company and Ryan Murphy Productions	based on One Flew Over the Cuckoo's Nest
Touchstone Television (2020)
Books of Blood	Anthology horror	October 7, 2020			Hulu	20th Century Studios (copyright holder only), Beetlecod Productions, Seraphim Films and Fuzzy Door Productions	based on Books of Blood

== See also ==
- ABC Signature, formerly known as the original Touchstone Television
- Touchstone Pictures, the dormant film studio label and namesake
- 20th Century Studios (formerly 20th Century Fox)
- Fox Television Stations
- 20th Digital Studio (formerly Zero Day Fox and Fox Digital Studio)
