= Benders (TV series) =

- Genre: Sitcom
- Created by: Jim Serpico; Tom Sellitti
- Starring: Chris Distefano; Steve Schirripa; Steve Greenstein; Andrew Schulz; Lindsey Broad; Mark Gessner; Ruy Iskandar
- Opening theme: "You Gotta Teller" by Zeus
- Composers: Anthony Roman; James "Mod" Asciutto
- Country of origin: United States
- Original language: English
- No. of seasons: 1
- No. of episodes: 8

Production
- Executive producers: Denis Leary; Tom Sellitti; Jim Serpico
- Producer: Tyson Bidner
- Production locations: Queens, New York
- Cinematography: Joe Kessler
- Editor: Elizabeth Merrick
- Running time: 22 minutes
- Production company: Apostle

Original release
- Network: IFC
- Release: October 1 – November 19, 2015

Benders is an American sitcom created by Tom Sellitti and Jim Serpico. On March 31, 2015, the series was ordered by IFC. The series premiered on IFC on October 1, 2015. On December 30, 2015, the series was canceled by IFC.

== Premise ==
The series is centered on a group of guy friends in Queens, New York whose lives revolve around their obsession for hockey. Even though they don't have the best skills, they have the passion to play in the local men's amateur hockey league. And they go through everyday life with problems that could impact their involvement on their team, "The Chubbys".

== Cast ==
=== Main cast ===
- Andrew Schulz as Paul Rosenberg
- Lindsey Broad as Karen Rosenberg
- Chris Distefano as Anthony Pucello
- Mark Gessner as Dickie Litski
- Ruy Iskandar as Sebalos

=== Recurring cast ===
- Mark Margolis as Paul's Grandfather
- Godfrey as Rajon Tucker
- Steve Schirripa as Vito Gentile
- Steve Greenstein as Dino
- Dan Amboyer as Christian
- Meredith Hagner as Tanya
- Nneka Okafor as Angela
- Bianca Rutigliano as Kelly
- Alexis Suarez as Pedro

=== Notable guest stars ===
- Jim Norton as Brian Beale
- Dan Amboyer as Christian
- Jim Breuer as Himself
- Robert Kelly as EMT Thurber

== Production ==
Denis Leary's production company, Apostle, developed the scripted comedy for IFC as Uncle Chubby's. Jim Serpico and Tom Sellitti wrote the script.

== Episodes ==
No.	Title	Directed by	Written by	Original release date	Prod. code	US viewers (millions)
1	"Choke"	Jim Serpico	Jim Serpico & Tom Sellitti	October 1, 2015	101	0.068
After being on chemotherapy, Paul's grandfather wants to put an end to his misery and asks Paul to help him kill himself. Not only does this impact his involvement in the hockey team, but this puts Paul in a difficult situation. However, "pappy" makes Paul a tempting offer of getting $10,000 money from his life insurance policy. So Paul goes to his friend and teammate Anthony, who asks his uncle John if he "knows a guy" for taking care of the problem. Then Paul tells his wife Karen, who teaches him a rear-naked choke to put on him. At the last second, Pappy decides to go on living and tells the guys to live every moment like it's their last and do what they do best; "sucking at hockey".
2	"Wake 'Em Up"	Richie Keen	Jim Serpico & Tom Sellitti	October 8, 2015	102	0.077
Paul agrees for Karen's cousin Brian Beale, who has cancer to play hockey with them, and his skills are horrible. However, the guys go to their favorite bar, Maggie Mae's and gets inspiration from their "Uncle Chubby's Brownie Sundae" for the new team name, ditching the previous name, the Bullets. But their momentum is stopped when Brian suddenly dies. And rival player Rajon Tucker tells them their play-off game is on the same day as the wake, so Paul tries to reschedule it with funeral home director Vito Gentile. In order to do so, Vito wants his logo as the team sponsor on their jerseys. Meanwhile, Karen shares Sebalos' questionable Asian joke with her Chinese acupuncturist, who drops her as a client. Note: This episode was dedicated to the memory of the real Brian Beale (his photo appeared at the end).
3	"Prodigal Son"	Tom Sellitti	Jim O'Dotherty	October 15, 2015	103	0.065
When Anthony joins the Dominicans team to play in a higher hockey division, along with playing for the Chubby's in D8, Paul, Sebalos, and Dickie decide to one-up Anthony by playing for a D7 Christian team. But in order to do so, they must clean up their act, quit drinking and attend their new team's Bible study. This is the perfect excuse for Paul to sober up when Karen caught him "sleep pissing" on their bedroom wall after a night out at the bar. Meanwhile, Karen needs her own excuse to drink so she hosts a so-called book club. In the end, Anthony has to quit his team because his teammates are using him for free labor, causing the rest of the guys to quit Team Jesus and sobriety.
4	"Fight Club"	Michael Blieden	Frank Sebastiano	October 22, 2015	104	0.072
Paul and Karen have to take a few sick days at home after they both get chicken pox. However, Anthony, Sebalos and Dickie contract the sickness themselves and decide to crash their "pox party", causing them not to get any rest from the guys' recklessness. But at least the Chubbys are on a winning streak in their absences. To make matters worse, Paul and Karen's upstairs neighbor, Brock has started running on his treadmill every late night, disrupting their sleep. So the guys teach Paul how to deal with him by showing him how to fight. But there's no need since Paul and his neighbor end up making amends by sharing diet and exercising techniques while eating and watching TV on the couch.
5	"The Sport of Kings"	Michael Blieden	Jim Serpico & Tom Sellitti	October 29, 2015	105	0.065
After Rajon's lack of enthusiasm stopping pucks during a game he filled-in for when their original goalie quit, Anthony recruits a new goaltender, which creates a problem among the Chubbys because the goalie's a girl. Even though Molly played Division I women's hockey for Northeastern, the guys have to make a pact not to "bang" their new teammate. Later, Molly presents the guys with a promising new business venture in horse breeding. They invest $5,000 each into a stud stallion named Fother Mucker, who unexpectedly dies during the process from a weak heart. The incident causes them all to lose their money and Molly after Anthony breaks the team pact with her while at the stable.
6	"Secrets and Lies"	Richie Keen	Frank Sebastiano	November 5, 2015	106	0.144
After finding Karen's private journal Paul goes to a locksmith to open it in order to learn her secrets. But he doesn't like what he reads about their monotonous sex life. Even though Paul decides to up his game and try something new, Karen gets him back for his snooping by writing misleading thoughts about Anthony. Meanwhile, when Sebalos and Anthony make a delivery for Vito to a massage parlor, they receive some erotic massages. Sebalos chooses an attractive Asian masseuse, who he falls for. He decides to pursue the relationship further despite her occupation, but finds out she has a boyfriend and was just using him for money.
7	"Nice Day For a Boat Ride"	Joe Kessler	Jim Serpico & Tom Sellitti	November 12, 2015	107	0.080
After returning from a business trip in Las Vegas, Karen gets a temporary boob job called "vacation breasts" that only last two weeks with a saline injection. And Paul becomes paranoid when his friends and other men pay attention to her. When they meet Jim Breuer at Maggie Mae's, the comedian hangs all over Karen. Insecure Paul makes a deal with her: he will buy her diamond earrings if she gets a breast reduction, but Karen confesses the truth. Meanwhile, Anthony has trouble sleeping because his new girlfriend Tanya won't stop talking in bed while he's trying to sleep. Knowing her allergies, he adopts the most-allergy ridden cat hoping it will drive her away, but to his surprise she loves her pet.
8	"California Here We Come"	Jim Serpico	Jim Serpico & Tom Sellitti	November 19, 2015	108	0.069
When Karen receives a rewarding new job offer at Own Body Magazine, she considers leaving her job at Lingerie Quarterly. The only problem is it's in California and they have to move. But Paul's upset because he has to leave The Chubby, his friends from childhood, behind. Also due to stress his alopecia comes back, causing him to lose an eyebrow. The guys throw them a wild farewell party that gets out of hand when they slip Karen a pot brownie. The day after, Karen is notified by HR they're administering a drug test. Since it was Sebalos' recipe, he helps Karen lose the THC in her body with a workout and a toxin cleansing. She passes and gets the position, and Paul says goodbyes to the guys.
