= Lauren Corrao =

American television executive

- Education: Brown University
- Occupation: Television Executive
- Spouse: Jim Jones

Lauren Corrao is an American television executive. She became Executive Vice President of Original Programming and Development at Freeform in 2019. She is a former programming executive for Comedy Central, where she oversaw The Daily Show With John Stewart and The Colbert Report. She was also formerly co-president of Tornante TV and Vice President of MTV.

== Early life & education ==
Corrao grew up in Providence, Rhode Island. Corrao earned her B.A. in semiotics from Brown University in 1983.

== Career ==
She started her career at MTV in 1983 as a production assistant, just days after graduating from Brown University. She rose through the ranks, becoming a vice president and executive producer. Corrao was instrumental in launching MTV’s non-music program development department, which was responsible for developing The Real World.

Following her time at MTV, Corrao spent four years at Fox Broadcasting Co., joining in 1994 and serving as vice president of comedy development and vice president of alternative and late-night development. She helped establish That 70s Show, Mad TV, and King of the Hill. She left the company in 1998.

Before joining Comedy Central in 2002, Corrao and her partner Peter Tolan secured a production deal with Touchstone Television, where she served as an executive producer for the series The Job with Denis Leary.

In December 2009, Corrao left Comedy Central, where she worked for seven years as a programming executive.

In 2013, Corrao was hired as the chief creative officer for Vuguru.

Corrao served as Executive Vice President of Original Programming and Development at Freeform from April 2019 to October 2020.

== Personal life ==
She and her husband, Jim Jones, have two children.
