= Mark Gessner =

American writer and actor

Mark Gessner is an American writer and actor.

== Education ==
Gessner was born in Sheffield, Vermont in 1980. Growing up in Vermont's Northeast Kingdom, Gessner performed as a child at Vermont Children's Theater in Lyndonville. Later he attended St. Johnsbury Academy and performed on the Fuller Hall stage there. He studied acting at Marymount Manhattan College and improv at New York's Upright Citizens Brigade.

== Career ==
He has appeared in films:

- 2010 God of Love as Bartender
- 2012 Aaron Wolf's Guest House
- 2015 Youth as Shy screenwriter
- 2016 It Had to Be You starring as Mark
- 2019 Drunk Parents as Special Agent Chad Milhouse

And on TV:

- 2015 The If-Then-Else episode of Person of Interest as Gary
- 2015 Benders as Dickie Litski
- 2016 Sex & Drugs & Rock & Roll as Noah Perkins
- 2017-2019 NCIS: New Orleans in season 4 and season 5 as Oliver Crane
- 2023 NCIS: Hawaiʻi episode 11, season 2 "Rising Sun" guest star as Agent Neil Pike
