= Canterbury's Law =

American legal drama television series

- DVD cover
- Genre: Legal drama
- Created by: Dave Erickson
- Starring: Julianna Margulies; Aidan Quinn; Ben Shenkman; Trieste Dunn; Keith Robinson
- Composer: Danny Lux
- Country of origin: United States
- Original language: English
- No. of seasons: 1
- No. of episodes: 6

Production
- Executive producers: Denis Leary; Jim Serpico; Mike Figgis; Walon Green; John Kane; Terry Kinney
- Camera setup: Single-camera
- Running time: 60 minutes
- Production companies: Apostle Productions; Sony Pictures Television

Original release
- Network: Fox
- Release: March 10 – April 18, 2008

Canterbury's Law is an American legal drama television series, which aired from March 10 to April 18, 2008 as a mid-season replacement on Fox. The show was created by Dave Erickson and executive produced by Denis Leary, Jim Serpico, Walon Green, John Kane, and Mike Figgis, who also directed the pilot. The series revolved around Elizabeth Canterbury (portrayed by Julianna Margulies), a rebellious defense attorney willing to bend the law if it protects the wrongfully accused. A rising star, she puts her career on the line to take on risky and unpopular cases, even when they take a toll on her personal life.

Produced by Sony Pictures Television and Apostle, the series aired Mondays at 9:00 pm and was broadcast in Australia and Canada on Nine Network and Global respectively. Due to the 2007–2008 Writers Guild of America strike, only six of the 13 episodes ordered were able to be produced.

On March 20, 2008, Fox announced that Canterbury's Law would move to the Friday 9:00 pm slot for the remaining episodes.

On May 15, 2008, Fox officially canceled the series.

== Plot ==
Elizabeth and her law professor husband, Matthew (Aidan Quinn), are both haunted by the disappearance of their young son (Jeremy Zorek) and have just settled in Providence, Rhode Island, in an attempt to distance themselves from the tragedy and put their relationship back together. But even as they try to move on beyond the tragedy, those goals become elusive whenever Elizabeth's work provides a stark reminder of the justice absent in their own lives.

At work, Elizabeth must also deal with coworkers Russell Krauss (Ben Shenkman), a former district attorney, who was forced out of his job by his financially strapped boss and whose knowledge will guide Elizabeth in their cases, even if she doesn't want to hear his reasoning or logic; Chester Fields (Keith Robinson), a congressman's son who wants to distance himself from his political family; and Molly McConnell (Trieste Dunn), a headstrong individual who's not afraid to switch sides, even if it's against Elizabeth.

Frank Angstrom (James McCaffrey) is a private investigator with whom Elizabeth has a sometime affair.

== Cast ==
=== Main characters ===
- Julianna Margulies as Elizabeth Canterbury
- Ben Shenkman as Russell Krauss
- Trieste Dunn as Molly McConnell
- Keith Robinson as Chester Fields
- Terry Kinney as Deputy Attorney General Zach Williams
- Aidan Quinn as Matthew "Matt" Furey
- James McCaffrey as Frank Angstrom

=== Recurring characters ===
- David Call as Martin, the receptionist

Jocko Sims was originally cast as Chester Fields but the role was re-cast in June 2007. Linus Roache was also replaced by Aidan Quinn in August 2007 after the former landed a regular starring role in Law & Order.

== Reception ==
The show received mixed to positive reviews from television critics. Review aggregator website Rotten Tomatoes reported a 58% approval rating, based on 33 reviews, with an average rating of 5.8/10. The website's consensus reads, "While Canterbury's Law births an amoral and intriguing antihero that Julianna Margulies plays with aplomb, the series is weighed down by uninspired courtroom drama." Metacritic gave the show 66 out of 100 based on 27 critics, indicating "generally favorable reviews".

== Episodes ==
No.	Title	Directed by	Written by	Original release date
1	"Pilot"	Mike Figgis	Dave Erickson	March 10, 2008
The series follows Elizabeth Canterbury, a rebellious defense attorney who's willing to bend the law in order to protect the wrongfully accused. A Rhode Island lawyer on the rise, Elizabeth puts her career on the line to take on risky and unpopular cases, even when they take a toll on her personal life, already shaky due to her strained marriage and the unsolved disappearance of her young son. Defending accused child murderer Ethan Foster, Elizabeth goes to unimaginable lengths to prove her client's innocence, putting her directly at odds with her associates at the firm, including her partner Russell Krauss, and the firm's young associates, the green Molly McConnell and cocksure Chester Grant.
2	"Baggage"	Jace Alexander	Sam Catlin	March 17, 2008
Elizabeth represents Louis Minot, a man who claims to have "special powers" after finding the remains of a man missing for almost 20 years who "told" Louis where to look. Everyone thinks Louis is crazy and guilty to boot, but Elizabeth, against her own better judgment, believes in his innocence and his abilities, especially after he reveals information about her missing son, Sam. But when more bodies are discovered based upon other "conversations" Louis has had, the case seems unwinnable. Meanwhile, Elizabeth makes a startling admission about Sam's abduction.
3	"What Goes Around..."	Rosemary Rodriguez	Michael S. Chernuchin	March 28, 2008
A vindictive Deputy Attorney General Williams builds a case against Elizabeth, impaneling a Grand Jury and executing search warrants in his effort to prove that she broke the law while defending accused child murderer Ethan Foster. Elizabeth's in the dark at first, but when Russell and Chester get wind of Williams' vendetta, they refuse to let her shutter Canterbury & Associates. Meanwhile, a terrified and unprepared Molly mounts her first defense; and after an important university faculty event, the gulf between Matt and Elizabeth becomes heartbreakingly apparent.
4	"Sweet Sixteen"	Milan Cheylov	Theresa Rebeck	April 4, 2008
While dealing with the aftermath of being arrested and jailed overnight for jury tampering and perjury, Elizabeth defends Izzy and Linda, high-school students accused of soliciting murder. When Linda secretly switches lawyers and cuts a deal, it's a case of she said-she said, and Elizabeth must learn to decipher high-school doublespeak if she's going to save her client.
5	"Trade-Off"	Timothy Busfield	Antoinette Stella	April 11, 2008
The seriousness of the indictment as well as her probable disbarment and imprisonment finally hits Elizabeth, who tries to cut a deal and get her affairs in order. Russell, Chester and Molly have a different plan, and behind Elizabeth's back, begin mounting a surprising defense, one that involves Deputy Attorney General Zach Williams, Elizabeth's prosecutor.
6	"Sick as Your Secrets"	Jace Alexander	Richard Whitley & Pamela J. Wechsler	April 18, 2008
In an effort to avoid defending a rapist on trial, something she swore she'd never do, Elizabeth works with the Attorney General's office on a plea for a former client and admitted rapist, but is blindsided by the rape victim, who is coaxed and enticed into testifying by a radio talk-show host looking to boost drive-time ratings. Meanwhile, Chester goes after a greedy slumlord when a little girl who lives in one of his rodent-infested properties is disfigured by a rat, and Molly gets her bar exam results.
