= Corrao =

Corrao is a surname. Notable people with the surname include:

- Angelo Corrao, Italian-American film and television editor
- Ignazio Corrao (born 1984), Italian politician
- Lauren Corrao, American television executive
- Ludovico Corrao (1927–2011), Italian politician and lawyer
