= The Job (2001 TV series) =

- Genre: Sitcom
- Created by: Denis Leary; Peter Tolan
- Starring: Denis Leary; Bill Nunn; Lenny Clarke; Diane Farr; Adam Ferrara; John Ortiz; Julian Acosta; Keith David; Wendy Makkena; Karyn Parsons
- Composer: Christopher Tyng
- Country of origin: United States
- Original language: English
- No. of seasons: 2
- No. of episodes: 19

Production
- Executive producers: Lauren Corrao; Jim Serpico; Denis Leary; Peter Tolan
- Camera setup: Single-camera
- Running time: 30 minutes
- Production companies: The Cloudland Company; Apostle; Touchstone Television; DreamWorks Television

Original release
- Network: ABC
- Release: March 14, 2001 – April 24, 2002

The Job is an American single-camera sitcom that aired on ABC between March 14, 2001, and April 24, 2002. Several of the principal actors went on to either star or guest star in the FX network's Denis Leary-produced Rescue Me. In Rescue Me, the lead character (played by Leary) is very similar to Mike McNeil, but is a fireman rather than a police officer.

== Summary ==
The series follows a New York City police officer named Mike McNeil (Denis Leary) – who indulges in adultery, alcohol, cigarettes, and prescription drug abuse – and his fellow bumbling detective pals. The show, which appeared to borrow the tone and look of NYPD Blue for semi-satirical purposes, was built around the Mike McNeil character, but relied on a strong ensemble cast.

== Cast ==
- Denis Leary as Det. Mike McNeil
- Bill Nunn as Det. Terrence Phillips
- Lenny Clarke as Det. Frank Harrigan
- Karyn Parsons as Toni
- Diane Farr as Det. Jan Fendrich
- Adam Ferrara as Det. Tommy Manetti
- John Ortiz as Det. Ruben Sommariba
- Julian Acosta as Al Rodriguez
- Wendy Makkena as Karen McNeil
- Keith David as Lt. Williams

== Episodes ==
Season	Episodes	Originally released	
Season	Episodes	First released	Last released
1	6	March 14, 2001	April 18, 2001
2	13	January 16, 2002	April 24, 2002

=== Season 1 (2001) ===
No. overall	No. in season	Title	Directed by	Written by	Original release date	Prod. code	Viewers (millions)
1	1	"Pilot"	Dean Parisot	Denis Leary & Peter Tolan	March 14, 2001	0100	10
The main precinct characters are introduced, and Detective Mike McNeil (Denis Leary), the protagonist, tries to juggle his career, wife and girlfriend. The precinct catches a murderer by making him believe that they are beating his grandmother.
2	2	"Elizabeth"	Tucker Gates	Denis Leary & Peter Tolan	March 21, 2001	0103	9.8
All the men at the precinct want to work on a harassment call from Elizabeth Hurley. Mike believes she is attracted to him when she kisses him after the two have dinner, but she uses him to make her boyfriend, Jason Laramie, jealous. Detective Terrence "Pip" Phillips' wife, Adina, believes McNeil, his partner, is a bad influence.
3	3	"Bathroom"	Tucker Gates	Denis Leary and Peter Tolan	March 28, 2001	0102	9.7
McNeil is taken hostage in the bathroom by Detective Frank Harrigan's runaway suspect.
4	4	"Foot"	Tucker Gates	Daphne Pollon, Denis Leary & Peter Tolan	April 4, 2001	0105	N/A
The precinct has to solve a case involving severed feet being left at a podiatrist's office. McNeil hunts down Detective Jan Fendrich's new boyfriend.
5	5	"Massage"	Tucker Gates	Denis Leary & Peter Tolan	April 11, 2001	0101	10
The precinct has to investigate a massage parlor that is giving handjobs to male customers. Ruben Sommariba's victim makes advances on him despite his attempts to avoid her. Jan has a suspect that made fun of her in high school. Pip tries to face his wife after he is at the massage parlor when it is shut down.
6	6	"Anger"	Tucker Gates	Mike Martineau	April 18, 2001	0104	7.6
McNeil is forced to take anger management classes for ripping a taxi driver out of his car for disrupting an arrest. Ruben feels guilty about shooting a man in self-defense.

=== Season 2 (2002) ===
No. overall	No. in season	Title	Directed by	Written by	Original release date	Prod. code	Viewers (millions)
7	1	"Sacrilege"	Peter Tolan	Story by : Bartow Church; Teleplay by : Peter Tolan & Denis Leary	January 16, 2002	0206	8.2
McNeil and Pip have to take the DA's daughter on a ride-along for a school newspaper article. Frank impersonates a monsignor in order to confront a man who is stealing money from the collection plate. The other members of the precinct have to confront a stripper dressed as a nun.
8	2	"Soup"	Tucker Gates	Denis Leary & Peter Tolan	January 23, 2002	0203	6.9
McNeil, Pip and Jan has to investigate a case involving a missing ballerina. Frank is on a soup diet, and they later find a soup cook has killed the ballerina. Ruben and Al have to confront a drunk Native American man living in Central Park.
9	3	"Telescope"	Tucker Gates	Story by : Richard Dresser & Denis Leary; Teleplay by : Richard Dresser	January 30, 2002	0211	8
Tommy steals a telescope from a suicide victim, and he, Frank and McNeil dress up as maintenance men in order to peep on a woman who does yoga topless in her apartment room. The woman finds out that they are detectives and sues the police department. Jan meets a man who turns out to be a criminal. Frank and Tommy have to keep dumping a dead body in a rival detective's, Hennessey, precinct. McNeil gives the telescope as a present for his son's birthday.
10	4	"Gina"	Adam Bernstein	Peter Tolan & Denis Leary	February 6, 2002	0207	7.9
Ruben is moonlighting Gina Gershon and Frank does so with Catherine McCord. A lesbian from Jan's case beats up McNeil and he has to face her again when he scams his way into protecting Gina. Pip has to face his wife after she finds out he had a run-in with an old girlfriend. Jan finds out that Al is a stripper.
11	5	"Boss"	Adam Bernstein	Mike Martineau	February 13, 2002	0209	6.9
Frank listens in on a crime boss and gets a tip on a horse race. Mike believes Toni is sleeping with her boss. Frank gets everyone to go in for the bet. He talks an evidence clerk, Ozzy, into putting $10,000 into the bet also. Jan and Ruben fight over an apartment that has just opened up because the owner has been killed. Mike nearly beats up Dave, Toni's boss, and fights with Toni because she slept with him. Ruben and Jan make an agreement over the apartment, but the victim's neighbor has already taken it. The two go to try to convict the neighbor of the crime.
12	6	"Quitter"	Tucker Gates	Peter Tolan & Denis Leary	February 27, 2002	0201	6.2
McNeil tries to give up drinking alcohol and starts to abuse cold medicine. The doctor who gives him pain killers is arrested. He uses male enhancement pills to help his sex life, but his girlfriend and wife will not sleep with him. McNeil lets a marijuana house continue using, but Garrity, a rival detective, busts it.
13	7	"Parents"	Adam Bernstein	Mike Martineau	March 6, 2002	0208	7
Toni forces Mike to have dinner with her and her parents by threatening him about telling Karen about their relationship. Tommy is interested in an aggressive convict. Jan dates a cop who dresses up as a prostitute. Mike feels pressured to lie about his lifestyle in front of Toni's parents, but the truths are found out. He pretends to give up his wife and his "old life."
14	8	"Barbecue"	Tucker Gates	Mike Martineau	March 13, 2002	0210	7.1
The Phillips have a 25th anniversary barbecue and Toni wants to go, still believing Karen has been told about her relationship with Mike. He devises a plan to have both Karen and Toni show up without seeing each other. Alcohol is being served in the back, without Adina's knowledge. Adina eventually finds out and Mike must leave. While he is leaving, Toni figures out that he has not told Karen about their relationship, and Toni vows to tell her sometime in the future.
15	9	"Betrayal"	Tucker Gates	Peter Tolan & Denis Leary	March 20, 2002	0213	8
Al broke his jaw and has to have it wired shut. Toni continually calls the house and hangs up. Frank tells the other precinct members that he has had a heart attack and when they arrive at the hospital the doctor reveals that it was only gas. The precinct investigates a missing persons call. Toni goes to Mike's house, and Mike sends Karen to her mother's house. Frank tries to start a new diet. Pip was thrown out of his house because he met with a woman from his past. Mike watches over the crime scene which discovers the missing woman. Toni goes to Mike's house, but leaves when she sees Karen kissing the neighbor, Ron. Pip visits his old friend. Frank caves in and eats a cake. Karen does not admit to Mike that she was with Ron.
16	10	"Neighbor"	Tucker Gates	David Walpert	April 10, 2002	0204	7.5
McNeil thinks his neighbor, Ron, is trying to flirt with his wife and sends Ruben and Al to spy on them. Tommy takes Frank with him to try to find Robert De Niro's dog. McNeil and Pip have to investigate a case involving dying pigeons. Karen sees Ruben and Al, and Mike has to compensate for his actions by giving his wife a nice night. Tommy picks up a devilish dog, but when he gets to De Niro's trailer, the dog has already been found.
17	11	"Gay"	Tucker Gates	Peter Tolan & Denis Leary	April 17, 2002	0202	6.9
McNeil thinks Frank is homosexual and he follows him around. Jan and Pip try to get free scales and wind up busting a drug deal. Ruben believes McNeil finds him attractive because McNeil said he would be if he were gay. Frank is actually busting a sex club suspect and meeting with his niece's wedding planner.
18	12	"Vacation"	Peter Tolan	Peter Tolan & Denis Leary	April 17, 2002	0205	7.4
McNeil, along with Toni, is sent to Florida in order to avoid being caught for impersonating a firefighter to make a drug bust. After being severely sunburned, McNeil is confined to his room. He believes Toni is flirting with a hotel employee and wants to take down a runaway criminal from New York City. The man is only planning a wedding for his daughter in New York.
19	13	"Dad"	Tucker Gates	Richard Dresser	April 24, 2002	0212	6.5
Mike and Pip have to go on a stakeout and Mike steals Ruben's portable television. A person seems to be stalking Frank and Tommy. Jan has a lump in her breast and Mike cannot keep her secret. Frank's stalker, Doug, turns out to be his son, who he left because he knew he could not handle raising. Mike and Pip's police car is stolen by some school kids. Ruben buys a better portable television and Mike is stuck with the poor one. Mike and Jan have dinner together to discuss how her life was affected by the false alarm.

== Home media ==
The complete series (19 episodes) was released on DVD in the United States in May 2005.
