= Fancy Brudgom =

- Brooklyn Nine-Nine episode
- Episode no.: Season 1 Episode 20
- Directed by: Victor Nelli, Jr.
- Written by: Laura McCreary
- Cinematography by: Giovani Lampassi
- Editing by: Sandra Montiel
- Production code: 120
- Original air date: March 11, 2014
- Running time: 22 minutes

Guest appearances
- Marilu Henner as Vivian Ludley; Dirk Blocker as Michael Hitchcock; Joel McKinnon Miller as Norm Scully; Kevin Bigley as Officer Deetmore; Beth Dover as Janice

Episode chronology
← Previous "Tactical Village"	Next → "Unsolvable"
- Brooklyn Nine-Nine season 1

"Fancy Brudgom" is the twentieth episode of the first season of the American television police sitcom series Brooklyn Nine-Nine. It was written by co-executive producer Laura McCreary and directed by Victor Nelli, Jr. It aired on Fox on March 11, 2014 in the United States.

In this episode, Charles Boyle (Joe Lo Truglio) makes Jake his best man. While planning for the wedding, however, Jake discovers that Boyle's fiancée has asked him to move with her to Canada. Meanwhile, Terry Jeffords (Terry Crews), Amy, and Gina Linetti (Chelsea Peretti) start a diet that turns out to be harder than expected. The episode was seen by an estimated 2.49 million household viewers and gained a 1.2/3 ratings share among adults aged 18–49, according to Nielsen Media Research. The episode received positive reviews from critics, who praised Boyle's character development and Crews' performance.

== Plot ==
Boyle asks Peralta to be his best man and Peralta accepts. Boyle then gives him a magazine called Fancy Brudgom (brudgom meaning 'groom' in Danish) to inform him of everything he needs to do for the wedding.

Peralta and Boyle taste cakes and find Boyle a suit for the wedding. However, Boyle informs Peralta that Vivian is moving to Ottawa and he is going with her, even though he does not want to. Peralta tries to convince Boyle to tell Vivian how he feels. Instead, Boyle panics and brings Vivian to a breakfast date with Peralta, hoping Peralta can tell Vivian that Boyle doesn't want to go to Ottawa. It backfires and Boyle and Vivian leave. Peralta later forces Boyle to confront Vivian. They decide to not move to Canada.

Meanwhile, Holt makes Rosa Diaz (Stephanie Beatriz) apologize to a patrol officer (Kevin Bigley) she humiliated. Jeffords, Santiago, and Gina start a diet together. Gina quickly loses the diet and Santiago eventually succumbs to junk food. Their actions upset Jeffords. Finally, Jeffords gives up. He reveals that he was on a diet because his wife was also on one and he wanted to support her. Before he can give up, he is handcuffed in order to continue the diet.

== Reception ==
=== Viewers ===
In its original American broadcast, "Fancy Brudgom" was seen by an estimated 2.49 million household viewers and gained a 1.2/3 ratings share among adults aged 18–49, according to Nielsen Media Research. This was a slight decrease in viewership from the previous episode, which was watched by 2.61 million viewers with a 1.3/3 in the 18-49 demographics. This means that 1.2 percent of all households with televisions watched the episode, while 3 percent of all households watching television at that time watched it. With these ratings, Brooklyn Nine-Nine was the second most watched show on FOX for the night, beating Glee but behind New Girl, sixth on its timeslot and tenth for the night, behind New Girl, a rerun of NCIS, a rerun of NCIS: Los Angeles, The Goldbergs, Growing Up Fisher, Chicago Fire, About a Boy, Agents of S.H.I.E.L.D., and The Voice.

=== Critical reviews ===
"Fancy Brudgom" received positive reviews from critics. Roth Cornet of IGN gave the episode a "great" 8.5 out of 10 and wrote, "'Fancy Brudgom' saw Jake once again rise to the occasion and come through for Boyle in his time in need, as Holt bestowed his leadership wisdom on Diaz – who seems to be a big believer in cruel to be kind. Meanwhile, Gina, Amy, and Terry starve in the name of love. The most effective portion of the episode was the A-storyline between Boyle and Jake, but the side-by-side B-storylines rounded out the episode nicely."

Molly Eichel of The A.V. Club gave the episode an "A−" grade and wrote, "But in each episode, Brooklyn Nine-Nine hits that 'heart' factor just right. Take how I initially felt about 'Fancy Brudgom': It was good, but I wasn't thrilled. Still, the more I thought about it, the more my affection grew. I can sit here and nitpick and fault Brooklyn Nine-Nine, but when it all comes down to it, I leave each episode feeling that warm and fuzzy feeling that exists when a show hits the sweet spot being trying too hard, miring itself in treacle territory, and when it elevates laughs to the point where it's cold and unfeeling. Each portion of the episode had this perfectly measured-out quality of heart."

Andy Crump of Paste gave the episode a 9.0 and wrote, "'Fancy Brudgom' is a major-minor episode—one that’s more about set-up and sweetness than actual incident—but it nevertheless takes viewers someplace new. If the series sticks the landing, then the payoffs should come around soon enough as Brooklyn Nine-Nine hurtles toward its first season finale."
