= Charges and Specs =

- Brooklyn Nine-Nine episode
- Episode no.: Season 1 Episode 22
- Directed by: Akiva Schaffer
- Written by: Gabe Liedman; Gil Ozeri
- Cinematography by: Giovani Lampassi
- Editing by: Sandra Montiel
- Production code: 122
- Original air date: March 25, 2014
- Running time: 22 minutes

Guest appearances
- Marilu Henner as Vivian Ludley; Dirk Blocker as Michael Hitchcock; Joel McKinnon Miller as Norm Scully; James Michael Connor as Deputy Commissioner Podolski; Joe Mande as Isaac; Ian Roberts as Lucas Wint

Episode chronology
← Previous "Unsolvable"	Next → "Undercover"
- Brooklyn Nine-Nine season 1

"Charges and Specs" is the twenty-second episode and season finale of the first season of the American television police sitcom series Brooklyn Nine-Nine. The episode, written by Gabe Liedman & Gil Ozeri and directed by Akiva Schaffer, aired on Fox in the United States on March 25, 2014.

In the episode, Jake investigates a civic leader who may have affiliations to drug trafficking, but is told by the Deputy Commissioner to drop the case. When he is caught investigating, he is in danger of being expelled from the police. Meanwhile, Boyle is still depressed after the cancellation of his wedding with Vivian. The episode was seen by an estimated 2.59 million household viewers and gained a 1.3/4 ratings share among adults aged 18–49, according to Nielsen Media Research. The episode received acclaim from critics, who praised the cast, the writing and the directing, citing it as a satisfying conclusion to the season.

== Plot ==
Jake arrives drunk at a bar, where he decides to buy drinks for everyone present. He tells the man next to him that he just got fired from the NYPD.

One week earlier, Boyle (Joe Lo Truglio) informs the precinct that Vivian (Marilu Henner) dumped him and that he is single again. Jake meets with Holt and Deputy Commissioner Podolski (James Michael Connor) to discuss his recent investigation into Lucas Wint (Ian Roberts), a civic leader who may be involved in money laundering. Since he has been harassing Wint, Jake is told to abandon the case, as it is just considered gossip. He continues investigating anyway, but is caught by Wint. Peralta is placed on administrative leave with a hearing a week later.

Still determined to crack the case, Jake enlists an unnaturally rebellious Amy and a reluctant Captain Holt to help him uncover more evidence. They succeed by infiltrating Wint's community center and finding evidence of the laundering, but Holt is informed of a larger conspiracy that will require a greater sacrifice from Jake in order to solve the case. Jake pretends he did not get information and is fired from the force after a performance at his hearing. However, this was a ruse. Peralta is assigned to help the FBI arrest the Ianucci crime family in undercover operations, who have a connection to Wint. Before leaving, Jake confesses his feelings to Amy. The man from the beginning of the episode is revealed to be a member of the Ianucci family. Meanwhile, Terry (Terry Crews), Gina (Chelsea Peretti), and Rosa (Stephanie Beatriz) help a depressed Boyle to move on. Later, a shocked Boyle and Gina discover that they slept together.

== Reception ==
=== Viewers ===
In its original American broadcast, "Charges and Specs" was seen by an estimated 2.59 million household viewers and gained a 1.3/4 ratings share among adults aged 18–49, according to Nielsen Media Research. This was a slight increase in viewership from the previous episode, which was watched by 2.49 million viewers with a 1.2/3 in the 18-49 demographics. This means that 1.3 percent of all households with televisions watched the episode, while 4 percent of all households watching television at that time watched it. With these ratings, Brooklyn Nine-Nine was the most watched show on FOX for the night, beating Glee and New Girl, fourth on its timeslot and seventh for the night, behind Growing Up Fisher, About a Boy, Person of Interest, NCIS: Los Angeles, NCIS, and The Voice.

=== Critical reviews ===
"Charges and Specs" received acclaim from critics. Roth Cornet of IGN gave the episode a "great" 8.8 out of 10 and wrote, "Brooklyn Nine-Nine wrapped-up its freshman season with an episode that reflected much of what we've enjoyed about the series all year. The relationships simultaneously went to some interesting places and remained faithful to what had been established previously. The writers have managed to justify the time that will elapse before we see these lovable maniacs next and have left plenty of room for big changes at the start of next season."

Molly Eichel of The A.V. Club gave the episode an "A" grade and wrote, "For a show that's strength was its ensemble from the very beginning, Brooklyn Nine-Nine ended its first season near-perfectly. Every character in its considerably deep arsenal was used exactly how they should have been, with each character getting a chance to show off before the show goes on hiatus for the summer. Not only did each character get the proper hiatus send-off and 'Charges And Specs' have real stakes, but the show also set up the second season on a trajectory for a strong start for what's to come."

Alan Sepinwall of HitFix wrote, "That's how you do a sitcom season finale, boys and girls. 'Charges and Specs' probably wasn't the funniest episode of the season, but it brought a bunch of character arcs to a head, gave most of the cast members a moment to shine, and ended in a place that could (as Schur notes in our interview) either fuel a whole bunch of stories at the start of next year or be waved away quickly if the writers aren't feeling it."

Andy Crump of Paste gave the episode a 9.8 and wrote, "There's an impressive maturity to how season one of Brooklyn Nine-Nine bids its major and minor players adieu, and maybe more than anything else, that's what will make the wait for season two tough. We know that this series can make us laugh, we know it's capable of producing fully drawn characters; what 'Charges and Specs' demonstrates is just how much the series is objective-driven in addition to being comedy-driven and character-driven. If the next go-round with the people of the Nine-Nine precinct maintains these qualities, then we're going to be in for a stellar ride."
