= Classmates (TV series) =

2003 American reality TV show

- Genre: Reality television
- Country of origin: United States
- Original language: English
- No. of seasons: 2
- No. of episodes: 96

Production
- Running time: 30 minutes
- Production companies: Small Cases Productions; Pipeline Entertainment; Classmates Online; Fox Lab; 20th Television

Original release
- Network: Fox
- Release: March 8 – August 24, 2003

Classmates is an American reality TV show that was aired on Fox in 2003. It was produced by Classmates Online, Inc, Fox Lab, and 20th Television. This show features classmates reunited.
