= Sirens (2011 TV series) =

British medical dramedy

- Genre: Comedy drama
- Created by: Brian Fillis; Tom Reynolds (pseudonym of Brian Kellett)
- Written by: Brian Fillis; Tony Basgallop; Sarah Phelps
- Starring: Rhys Thomas; Kayvan Novak; Richard Madden; Amy Beth Hayes
- Country of origin: United Kingdom
- Original language: English
- No. of series: 1
- No. of episodes: 6

Production
- Executive producers: Hal Vogel; David Aukin
- Producer: Chris Clough
- Production location: Leeds
- Running time: 48 minutes

Original release
- Network: Channel 4
- Release: 27 June – 1 August 2011

Related
- Sirens (USA)

Sirens is a British comedy-drama about an ambulance service team, broadcast on Channel 4. It was first screened on 27 June 2011.

The series is based on the book Blood, Sweat & Tea by Brian Kellett. The series is filmed predominantly in Leeds with some filmed in the surrounding areas. Locations featured including Headingley, Kirkstall, Adel, Hyde Park, Cookridge, Chapel Allerton and the main city centre including shopping areas of Briggate and Headrow.

On 17 October 2011, Rhys Thomas and Channel 4 confirmed that there would not be a second series.

In November 2013, USA Network revealed it was airing an American version of the show, which ran for two seasons from 2014 to 2015 before being canceled.

== Main cast ==
- Rhys Thomas as Stuart Bayldon, a talented Emergency Medical Technician. He has intimacy issues that Maxine believes stem from his estranged father.
- Richard Madden as Ashley Greenwick, Stuart's best friend and co-worker. He is gay, but does not like discussing it with Rachid.
- Kayvan Novak as Rachid Mansaur, the trainee on Stuart and Ashley's team. He pushes Ashley's buttons.
- Amy Beth Hayes as Sgt Maxine Fox, Stuart's other best friend.

=== Minor cast ===
- Ben Batt as Craig Scruton, the fireman.
- Morven Christie as Kirsty Schelmerdine, the hospital therapist
- Kobna Holdbrook-Smith as Ryan Bailey, Maxine's colleague.
- Annie Hulley as Stella Woodvine, paramedic (Stuart, Ashley & Rachid's boss).
- Tuppence Middleton as Sarah Fraisor, Rachid's girlfriend.
- Robert Stone as Fat Carl, a fellow paramedic.

== Episodes ==
No.	Title	Directed by	Written by	Original release date	U.K. viewers (millions)
1	"Up, Horny, Down"	Victor Buhler	Tony Basgallop	27 June 2011	1.86
Stuart, Ashley and Rachid are three randy, maverick paramedics. After Stuart attempts open heart massage to save the female victim of a road traffic accident, the trio are sent to see therapist Kirsty Shelmerdine to treat any potential post traumatic stress. She tells them they will be subject to the classic syndrome of Up, Horny, Down where elation is followed by sexual desire, the satisfaction of which will lead to depression. Stuart refuses to give in to his basic emotions and tries his hardest not to give in to his horny side by staying with his police friend Maxine, but ends up insulting her and getting thrown out. Meanwhile, Rachid has sex with a lady barrister and Ashley has a bondage session with a man who ends up causing him trouble. Stuart is the only one of the three boys not to suffer from depression, which makes him ideal for talking a potential suicide down from a bridge. His day ends on a down note, however, and he returns to Maxine to apologize for his actions.
2	"Two Man Race"	Victor Buhler	Brian Fillis	4 July 2011	1.62
Stuart, Rachid and Ashley find their male pride rattled by the lads from the local fire brigade. As the team make a drop-off in A&E, Stuart observes the waiting room is awash with the dregs of humanity and proclaims he's proud that he is infertile. When Ashley and Rachid tease him that he's not getting any anyway, he informs them that he has a date with Angie (Charlene McKenna), a student and eco-campaigner he met a few weeks back. As soon as he's alone, Stuart digs out her number and quickly arranges the date. After a shaky start, things are going well with Angie, but Stuart seems to be behaving in a macho way that neither he nor his friends recognize.
3	"I.C.E"	Damon Thomas	Tony Basgallop	11 July 2011	1.12
The paramedics are called out to a young male in a student house who is suffering from drug-induced paranoia. When Rachid goes to talk with a neighbour, he comes across a scary 'purple job' - a suicide victim who has been dead for some time. The realisation that 'Purple Phil' (Felix Scott) wasn't missed by anyone for a fortnight sets off an unlikely chain reaction for ladies' man Rachid. Convinced he doesn't want to meet his maker in similarly lonely circumstances, Rachid decides there is only one answer - he needs to settle down. Only thing is, he's got to find the girl to do it with...
4	"King of the Jungle"	Damon Thomas	Brian Fillis	18 July 2011	1.08
When Woodvine (Annie Hulley) threatens to split up the lads, Stuart's promise that 'his' crew will up their game sparks an immediate challenge to his leadership from Rachid. Stuart may believe that the alpha male is the cleverest rather than strongest member of the pack. Meanwhile, Ashley has an alpha male secret of his own, while Maxine tries to bring out her feminine side to appeal to internet date Derek (Graham O'Mara).
5	"Stress"	Amanda Boyle	Brian Fillis	25 July 2011	0.95
Stuart is in denial about the stress of his job so he decides to focus on Maxine's unsettled feelings about fireman Craig (Ben Batt), and how they're threatening her chances of promotion. Although he attempts to find subtle ways to reassure Maxine that Craig is really into her.
6	"Cry"	Amanda Boyle	Tony Basgallop	1 August 2011	0.88
In the series finale, Stuart is confronted with a life and death situation, which hits closer to home than expected. Having spent the whole of his adult life trying to deny his true feelings, Stuart is going to need a special friend to help him through this troubling time. Meanwhile, Ashley is surprised to find he's gained a live-in boyfriend, and Rachid's future as a member of the crew suddenly doesn't look so certain.

== Home release ==
A DVD of Sirens was released on 12 March 2012.

A book called Sirens (written by Tom Reynolds) was released on 25 July 2011, following the day-to-day life blogs of members of the emergency services.

== US remake ==
USA Network ordered a remake of the show before it even premiered in UK. Denis Leary developed the project and co-wrote it with Bob Fisher. They're also executive producers of the show alongside Jim Serpico, Hal Vogel and David Aukin.
