= Kevin Bigley =

American actor (born 1986)

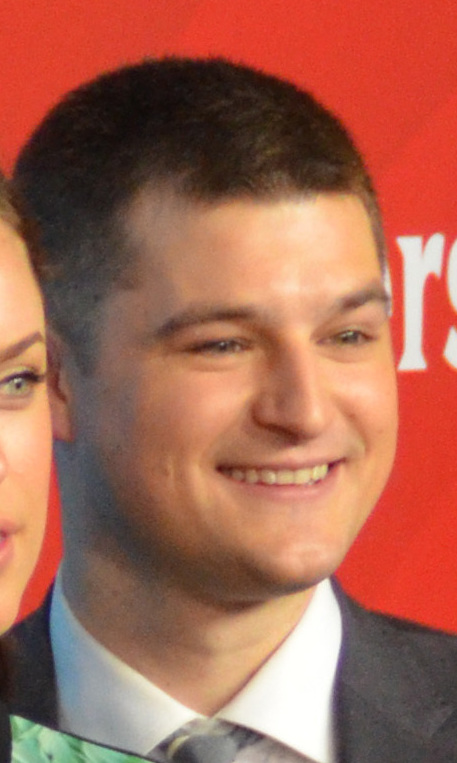
- Bigley in 2015
- Born: October 5, 1986 (age 40); Yuba City, California, U.S.
- Education: DePaul University (BFA)
- Occupation: Actor
- Years active: 2009–present
- Spouse: Kate Cobb (m. 2014)

Kevin Warren Bigley (born October 5, 1986) is an American television and film actor, best known for playing rookie paramedic Brian Czyk on the USA Network series Sirens (2014-2015), Rick Doyle in Animal Control, and as Luke Crossley in the Prime Video series Upload (2020-2025).

== Biography ==
Bigley was born in Yuba City, California, and studied acting at The Theatre School at DePaul University, in Chicago, Illinois. He began learning comedy as a defense mechanism to stave off bullying. Bigley began his acting career in San Francisco, California. He appeared in a seven-month run of "Killer Joe" at Profiles Theatre in Chicago. He also performed in "A Separate Peace" at Chicago's Steppenwolf Theater.

After working with actor Vince Vaughn on a TV pilot, Bigley moved to Los Angeles in 2010 and worked jobs including catering for a Jerry Springer game show, Baggage, on the GSN. He landed a part in Vaughn's 2011 movie The Dilemma and went on to appear onscreen in film and television, including on the series Bones, CSI: Miami and Chicago Code before winning the role of rookie EMT Brian Czyk the USA Network series Sirens.

In 2019, Bigley was cast to play a recurring character in the Amazon Original series Undone, then later in 2020, he was cast as a main character, Luke, in the science fiction comedy Upload, another Amazon Original.

== Filmography ==
=== Films ===
Year	Title	Role	Notes
2009	The Survivors	Vampire	Short
2011	The Dilemma	Bank Customer	
2011	My Left Hand Man	Beckett Emerson	Short
2014	Stretch	Faux Hawk	
2016	Rebirth	Chad	
2016	Delinquent	Britt	
2016	The Angry Birds Movie	Greg (voice)	
2020	The Wretched	Ty	
TBA	Thud †		Post-production

=== Television ===
Year	Title	Role	Notes
2010	Matadors	Paul	Television film
2011	Detroit 1-8-7	Paul Flynn	Episode: "Ice Man/Malibu"
2011	The Chicago Code	Beat Copper #1	Episode: "Pilot"
2011	CSI: Miami	Nick Holland	Episode: "Special Delivery"
2012	Friday Night Dinner	Paul Fisher	Television film
2012	Game Change	Track Palin	Television film
2012	Coco & Ruby	Jake Plumber	2 episodes
2013	Bones	Sidney Jouron	Episode: "The Fact in the Fiction"
2013	Melissa & Joey	Devin	Episode: "Bad Influence"
2014	Brooklyn Nine-Nine	Officer Deetmore	Episode: "Fancy Brudgom"
2014–2020	BoJack Horseman	Quentin Tarantulino & Shep Von Trapp	7 episodes; Voice role
2014–2015	Sirens	Brian Czyk	Lead role
2015	American Dad!	Daniel Calf (voice)	Episode: "Seizures Suit Stanny"
2016	Scream Queens	Randall	2 episodes
2016	*Loosely Exactly Nicole	Derrick	6 episodes
2017	The House: A Hulu Halloween Anthology	Jonathan Prather	Episode: "Unexplained Phenomena"
2017	Parked		Television film
2018	Here and Now	Michael	4 episodes
2018–2019	Splitting Up Together	Mr. Dodson	2 episodes
2019	Undone	Reed Hollingsworth	Recurring role
2020–2025	Upload	Luke Crossley	Series regular
2023-2025	Animal Control	Rick Doyle	Recurring Role
2025	Stick	Golf Bro #2	1 episode
2026	9-1-1	Peter "Pete" Morelli	Episode: "Pick Your Poison"
2026	R.J. Decker	Vince	Episode: "Burn Notice"
