= Unsolvable =

- Brooklyn Nine-Nine episode
- Episode no.: Season 1 Episode 21
- Directed by: Ken Whittingham
- Written by: Prentice Penny
- Cinematography by: Giovani Lampassi
- Editing by: Cortney Carrillo
- Production code: 121
- Original air date: March 18, 2014
- Running time: 22 minutes

Guest appearances
- Kyle Bornheimer as Teddy Wells; Dirk Blocker as Michael Hitchcock; Joel McKinnon Miller as Norm Scully; Dan Donohue as Martin Cozner; Heather Olt as Sophia Bunsen

Episode chronology
← Previous "Fancy Brudgom"	Next → "Charges and Specs"
- Brooklyn Nine-Nine season 1

"Unsolvable" is the twenty-first episode of the first season of the American television police sitcom series Brooklyn Nine-Nine. Written by co-executive producer Prentice Penny and directed by Ken Whittingham, it aired on Fox in the United States on March 18, 2014.

In this episode, Jake decides to take on an 8-year-old case that is deemed "unsolvable" and seeks Terry's help in solving it; Amy, planning a romantic vacation with her boyfriend Teddy, tries to obscure her true intentions from Holt; and Boyle, downcast after the end of his relationship, is told of a great secret. The episode was seen by an estimated 2.50 million household viewers and gained a 1.1/3 ratings share among adults aged 18–49, according to Nielsen Media Research. The episode received mostly positive reviews from critics, who praised Andy Samberg's performance.

== Plot ==
In the cold open, the squad notices Holt's injured his wrist and speculate what could have led to it. Holt breaks them up and secretly tells Jake he hurt himself in a hula-hooping class only because he knows the rest of the precinct won't believe him.

When Jake is allowed the weekend off because of a hot streak in solving cases, he decides to take on an 8-year old cold case that everyone believes is unsolvable. With the help of Sgt. Jeffords (Terry Crews), the two try to crack the case once and for all. Despite coming across more dead ends than before, Jake refuses to give up the case, frustrating Jeffords.

Meanwhile, Amy plans a romantic trip with new boyfriend Teddy (Kyle Bornheimer), but an unexpected event with Holt, which Amy unwittingly volunteered for beforehand, jeopardizes it. Under Gina's suggestion, she attempts to lie to Holt, claiming she has a dental appointment. However, Holt personally takes Amy to a dentist. This causes Amy to reveal that she had plans and lied to Holt, which disappoints him. The dentist then reveals that Amy's aggressive brushing technique has caused seven cavities. Amy apologizes to Holt for the deception and gets permission to take the following weekend with Teddy off.

Gina (Chelsea Peretti) and Rosa (Stephanie Beatriz) let a downtrodden Boyle (Joe Lo Truglio) in on one of the best-kept secrets of the precinct, their secret bathroom named Babylon. They demand he keep quiet about it. Nevertheless, Scully (Joel McKinnon Miller) and Hitchcock (Dirk Blocker) do some of their best detective work ever and figure out what Boyle is hiding. Gina reprimands Boyle for his mistake, but forgives him due to it stemming from his relationship troubles with Vivian. She manages to get Scully and Hitchcock out by giving them her chair and wolf blanket.

Thanks to Jake pulling an all-nighter, he finally solves the case by figuring out the supposed murder victim, Nate Dexter, isn't even dead and the real victim was someone he killed after being caught sleeping with the latter's wife. Despite his accomplishment, Jeffords notices that Jake still isn't happy and figures out Jake's sadness comes from Amy dating Teddy. He tells him that solving more cases won't fix his problem but spending time with friends will. The two proceed to get drunk at Shaw's with Boyle.

== Reception ==
=== Viewers ===
In its original American broadcast, "Unsolvable" was seen by an estimated 2.50 million household viewers and gained a 1.1/3 ratings share among adults aged 18–49, according to Nielsen Media Research. This was a slight increase in viewership from the previous episode, which was watched by 2.49 million viewers with a 1.2/3 in the 18-49 demographics. This means that 1.1 percent of all households with televisions watched the episode, while 3 percent of all households watching television at that time watched it. With these ratings, Brooklyn Nine-Nine was the second most watched show on FOX for the night, behind Glee, fifth on its timeslot and eleventh for the night, behind Glee, Marvel Studios: Assembling a Universe, The Goldbergs, Person of Interest, Growing Up Fisher, Chicago Fire, About a Boy, NCIS: Los Angeles, NCIS, and The Voice.

=== Critical reviews ===
"Unsolvable" received mostly positive reviews from critics. Roth Cornet of IGN gave the episode a "great" 8.5 out of 10 and wrote, "Another strong showing from the B99 team as we head towards the Season 1 finale. To some degree, the focus has been on Boyle and Peralta's romantic woes over the last couple of weeks, and I assume that will play a big part in the closer."

Molly Eichel of The A.V. Club gave the episode a "B+" grade and wrote, "'Unsolvable' combines those two spheres — workplace comedy and the cop show—exceedingly well. Other episodes have done so, and done it well, but 'Unsolvable' in particular feels like a mature episode structurally. The major plot arcs — namely Boyle's possible move to suburban Ottawa with fiancé Vivian and Peralta's long-simmering crush on Santiago — largely stay stagnant. That's totally okay. Both ideas are touched upon in order to create their own self-contained narratives, and there's only so much movement that can happen before their inevitable end, and Brooklyn Nine-Nine needs to save something for the final two episodes. Yet, 'Unsolvable' feels like the work of a show mature enough to move into an even more confident second season than its already thoroughly enjoyable first."

Andy Crump of Paste gave the episode an 8.8 and wrote, "After the gang took a break from busting crooks, following up on leads, or doing anything remotely resembling police work last week in 'Fancy Brudgom,' they’re back—well, most of them, at least — to acting like they're cops with 'Unsolvable,' which means that all of the heartfelt, character-oriented goodness that's come to define the series' overarching quality gets pushed aside in favor of hilarity in law enforcement for most of the episode."
