= Tom Reynolds (EMT) =

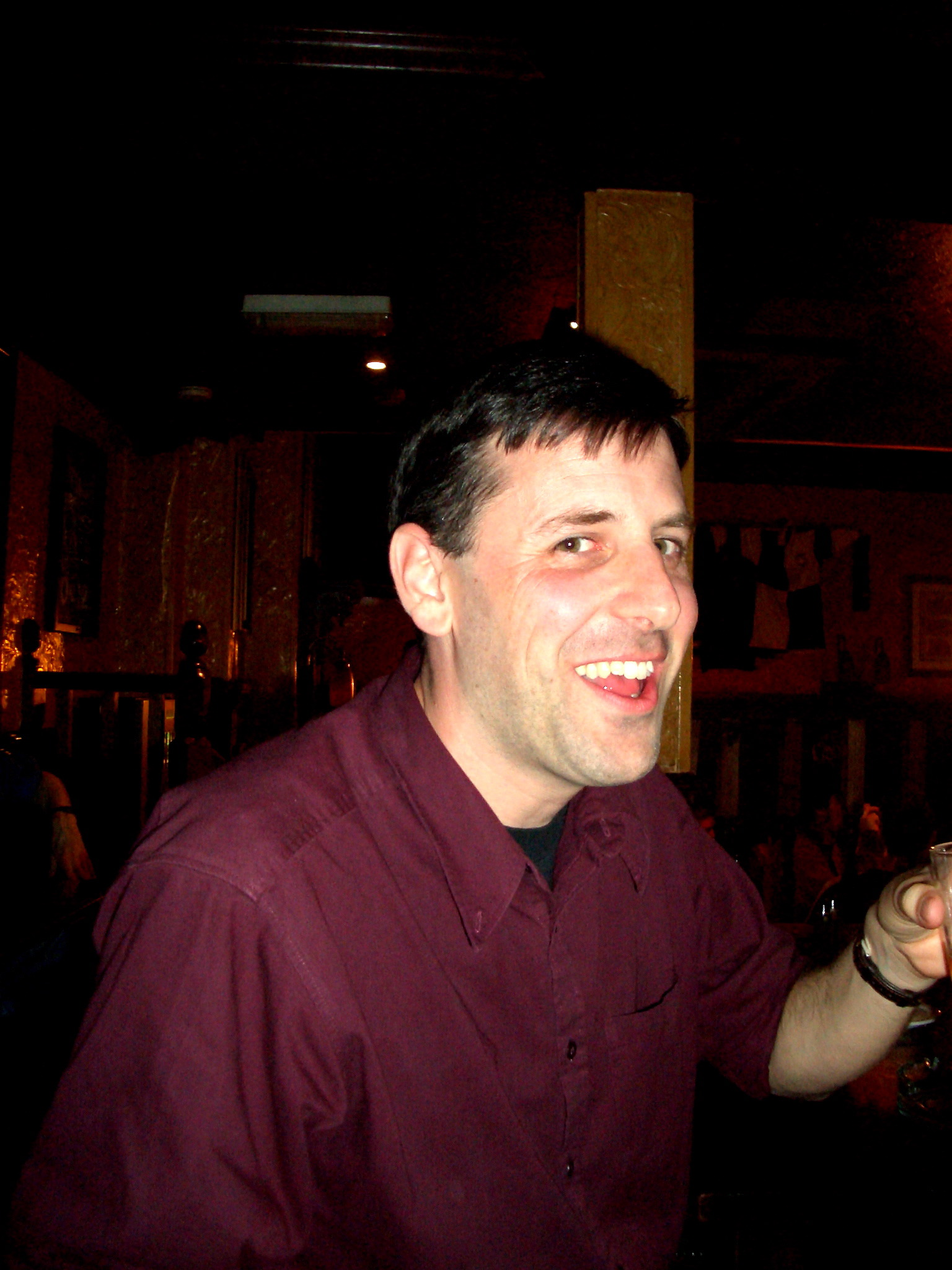
- Born: Brian Kellett; 1971 (age 54–55); London, England
- Occupation: Emergency medical technician
- Writing career
- Genre: Medical
- Website: briankellett.net/raor/

Tom Reynolds is the pseudonym of Brian Kellett, a nurse and once emergency medical technician for the London Ambulance Service, England, whose award-winning blog, Random Acts of Reality, has been published in two memoirs, Blood, Sweat & Tea in 2006 and More Blood, More Sweat & Another Cup of Tea in 2009. His career in the NHS started c. 1994 at the age of 23, when he worked as an Accident and Emergency nurse. Since beginning his blog he has been interviewed in newspapers, television and radio, and now provides opinion pieces on medical care in some UK newspapers.

His first book was used as the basis for the Channel 4 series Sirens, which first aired in June 2011.

== Bibliography ==
- Blood, Sweat & Tea, The Friday Project, 2006
- More Blood, More Sweat and Another Cup of Tea, The Friday Project, 2009

== See also ==
- Healthcare in London
