= Bob Fisher (screenwriter) =

American screenwriter

Bob Fisher (born 1961) is an American screenwriter whose credits include Wedding Crashers, the 2011 Fox comedy series Traffic Light, and We're the Millers. He is a co-writer and co-executive producer for the US adaptation of Sirens.

In 2014, he spoke at an event at Cal State Long Beach's Hall of Science; he talked about how he became a screenwriter. He said that he considered attending law school after college but instead became a bartender. While a student he read an article about television writers and how well they were paid. This gave him the idea to begin writing his own scripts for practice. His first screenwriting job was in 1995 for The Bonnie Hunt Show.

His film, We're the Millers, took 12 years to make and generated more than $270 million at the box office.

== Filmography ==
=== Films ===
Year	Title	Credit	Notes
2005	Wedding Crashers	Writer	Won - People's Choice Award for Favorite Comedic Movie; Nominated - Critics' Choice Award for Best Film - Comedy
2013	We're the Millers	Screenplay	Nominated - People's Choice Award for Favorite Comedic Movie
2018	Overboard	Screenplay	
2022	The Valet	Screenplay	

=== Television ===
Year	Title	Credit	Notes
1995	The Bonnie Hunt Show	Guy at Bar	Episode: The Phone Call
1996–1997	Married... with Children	Writer & Executive story editor	12 episodes
1998–1999	For Your Love	Writer & Supervising producer	5 episodes
2000	American Adventure	Writer & executive producer	TV movie
2000–2001	The Trouble with Normal	Writer & Supervising producer	9 episodes
2009	The Law	Writer & executive producer	TV movie
2011	Traffic Light	Creator, Writer & Executive Producer	13 episodes
2012	Family Trap	Writer & executive producer	TV movie
2014–2015	Sirens	Writer & executive producer	23 episodes
2019	The Moodys	Writer, director & Executive Producer	2 episodes
2023–present	Animal Control	Writer, director & Executive Producer	26 episodes
