= Blood, Sweat & Tea =

2006 book by Tom Reynolds

- Cover of UK paperback
- Author: Tom Reynolds
- Language: English
- Genre: Diary
- Publisher: Friday Books
- Publication date: 2006
- Publication place: United Kingdom
- Media type: Print (Paperback), online
- Pages: 280 pp
- ISBN: 1-905548-23-0
- OCLC: 70881360

Blood, Sweat & Tea is a book by ambulance technician Brian Kellett, writing under the pseudonym Tom Reynolds, about life in the London Ambulance Service.

The book is compiled from posts and correspondence from the blog Random Acts of Reality, one of the earliest high-readership blogs in England. The book covers Reynolds's career from 2003 to 2006, and discusses his career as an emergency medical technician and a rapid responder.

Although often critical of NHS policies and management, the book was well received within the European emergency services, and the book (with its associated blog) is now cited in the NHS's own guidelines on staff blogging.

Unusually for a newly published mainstream book, the entire text of the book was placed online under a Creative Commons Licence.

The book has also inspired the TV series Sirens, which first aired in June 2011 on Channel 4.

== See also ==
- Blogs
- London Ambulance Service
- National Health Service
