= Apostle (production company) =

Apostle is a New York-based production company specializing in television production created by stand-up comedian and actor Denis Leary and his business partner Jim Serpico. Apostle created the hit TV series Rescue Me about a post-9/11 FDNY crew and the drama in their personal lives.

In June 2007, Apostle signed a 3-year production deal with Sony to create at least 8 new television shows.

== Productions ==
=== Past productions ===
- The Job (2001–2002)
- Rescue Me (2004–2011)
- Shorties Watchin' Shorties (2004)
- Canterbury's Law (2008)
- Maron (2013–2016)
- Sirens (2014–2015)
- Sex & Drugs & Rock & Roll (2015–2016)
- Benders (2015)
