= Jim Serpico =

American TV producer

Jim Serpico is the American co-founder, along with Denis Leary, of Apostle, a production company in New York City, specializing in television production.

== Career ==
Serpico was also an executive producer for Leary's stand-up shows from the 1990s, including No Cure for Cancer and Lock 'n Load. He has produced a number of television programs including Rescue Me, Canterbury's Law, The Job, Maron, Sirens, and Sex & Drugs & Rock & Roll. In 2004, he won a "Visionary Award" from the Producers Guild of America.
