= Daniel Reisinger =

Australian filmmaker

- Daniel Reisinger in 2024
- Born: Sydney, Australia
- Known for: Film; Television; Advertising
- Notable work: And Mrs; Sideswiped; Drunk History Australia
- Style: Romantic comedy; Comedy drama; Dark humor
- Website: https://www.danielreisinger.com/

Daniel Reisinger is an Australian film and television director, writer, and producer working in Australia, the United Kingdom and the United States. He is best known for directing the 2024 British romantic-comedy feature film And Mrs starring Aisling Bea and Colin Hanks, and for co-creating, directing and executive-producing the American television series Sideswiped with Carly Craig. Reisinger is also a multiple award winner in the field of advertising.

== Early career ==
Reisinger began his career in news and documentary production at the Australian Broadcasting Corporation (ABC), where he worked on stories including the search for the sunken Second World War Australian cruiser HMAS Sydney (D48) and reporting on the family history of cricketer Donald Bradman. While at the ABC he was nominated as the broadcaster's representative at the Young Australian Leaders forum.

Reisinger has also directed music videos, for which his work has gained industry recognition. In 2009, he won an award for the Best Music Video at the Kodak Inside Film Awards, for a music video he directed for Australian band Short Stack.

His short film Status Update - A Facebook Fairytale won the Special Jury Prize at the Friars Club Comedy Film Festival in 2013, and was reportedly screened at Facebook’s headquarters in Silicon Valley. The short led Ain’t It Cool News to dub Reisinger "a force to be reckoned with".

== Television ==
=== Sideswiped ===
In 2018, Reisinger co-created, executive-produced, and directed the comedy television series Sideswiped for YouTube Premium. It follows a single woman who vows to date all 252 of her Tinder matches on her 35th birthday.

The show stars series co-creator Carly Craig alongside Rosanna Arquette, Chelsea Frei and Craig Frank, with celebrity guest appearances by the likes of Jason Sudeikis, Rick Springfield, Peter Gallagher, or Christopher McDonald.

==== Distribution ====
The show was originally aired through YouTube Premium. In 2025, ITVX acquired redistribution rights to stream the series in the United Kingdom. In 2026, Vizio announced the show would be streamed in the United States through its WatchFree+ service.

==== Reception ====
The series had reportedly received over 55 millions views as of 2024. Vanity Fair described Sideswiped as "a thoroughly modern romantic comedy", and IndieWire called it "hilarious" and "truly heartfelt", giving the show a "B" grade. Paste Magazine rated it 8.6 out of 10.

The show was nominated for a Shorty Award in 2019 in the Web series category. The same year, Marie Claire included it in a Top 10 list of the best web series of all time. In 2021, Paste Magazine included it in a list of the 13 best YouTube Premium television shows.

=== Drunk History: Australia ===
In 2020, Reisinger directed the pilot for Drunk History: Australia, an Australian adaptation of the American comedy series Drunk History for Network 10 and Paramount Australia. The pilot featured Rhys Darby and Stephen Curry and topped the Australian ratings during its broadcast, becoming the country's most-watched trending programme.

== Film ==
=== And Mrs ===
Reisinger made his feature film directorial debut in 2024 with And Mrs, a romantic comedy-drama – or "dramedy" – centred on grief. The film follows the story of Gemma, played by BAFTA-winning Irish comedienne Aisling Bea, as she seeks to come to terms with the loss of her fiancé Nathan, played by Emmy nominee Colin Hanks, by deciding to go ahead with their wedding posthumously (a practice known as necrogamy).

Reviews described And Mrs as "subverting the expectations of a rom-com", playing with taboos while putting its finger on the "funny side of grief". Reisinger characterized the movie as deeply personal, having lost his mother to COVID-19 while the film was in pre-production.

==== Production ====
The film was produced in the United Kingdom and filmed in London, with Reisinger credited as "giving east London a bit of the old Richard Curtis treatment". In addition to Bea and Hanks in the lead roles, the cast includes Billie Lourd, Susan Wokoma, Harriet Walter, Sinéad Cusack, Peter Egan, Elizabeth McGovern, Omari Douglas, Arthur Darvill, and guest appearances by Nish Kumar and Paul Kaye. The script was written by Australian screenwriter and playwright Melissa Bubnic, and BAFTA-winning British producer Dan Hine oversaw the production.

And Mrs premiered out-of-competition at the Edinburgh International Film Festival in August 2024. It was released in the United Kingdom through Universal Pictures International in August 2024 and subsequently streamed on Netflix UK. In Australia it was released theatrically through Palace Cinemas as part of the Russell Hobbs British Film Festival in November 2024. Following its release, it reached No. 5 on Netflix’s Top 10 film charts in Australia and No.6 in Ireland.

The film’s release was also used as a platform for raising awareness of bereavement support – the team partnered with grief charities in every market the film was shown in. Reisinger authored a first-person essay on finding laughter in grief for British magazine The Big Issue ahead of its UK release.

==== Reception ====
And Mrs holds a Tomatometer score of 77% on Rotten Tomatoes, a 7/10 rating on Awards Buzz, and a 4-star rating on Common Sense Media. It was generally positively reviewed by The Guardian, the Daily Express, Metro, The Hollywood Reporter, and other industry publications and podcasts.

The Daily Express called it a "delightfully offbeat romantic-comedy", while the Metro warned viewers to prepare to get "their hearts torn out". The Guardian described it as "cathartic romcom" that "rides an emotional crescendo" and "saves a real sucker punch for the credits". In its review of the film, it also described it as "so barmy you want it to be true". The Hollywood Reporter called it "a bittersweet rom-com" with "a stellar ensemble". Bea’s performance is described as "magnetic" and "an absolute hoot", while Lourd is said to deliver a "masterclass in comedy". Glam Adelaide described it as a "charming, if predictable comedy-romance".

== Advertising ==
Reisinger joined production company Infinity Squared in 2012 and has received numerous awards for his work in the field of advertising. He is a multiple winner of the prestigious Cannes Lions awards, including a Gold and a Silver Lion in 2026 for mycar Tyre & Auto’s campaign "The Sunburnt Car", a Bronze Lion in 2021 for KFC’s "Michelin Impossible" campaign, and five Cannes Lions for his "Sponsor the White House" campaign in 2012. His campaigns have also received numerous other industry awards globally including two Gold APAC Effies and four Spikes Asia Awards (one Grand Prix, two Gold and one Silver).

== Style ==
Reisinger describes himself as a "visual director who mines comedy from pathos". His early short was described by Refined Geekery as "a beautifully-shot dark comedy", and by Ain’t It Cool News as "fresh" and poking at "our collective obsessions", taking viewers in "directions you might not expect, but ultimately find yourself enjoying". Short of the Week praised the show for being "high on production values, as well as laughs", adding the short was "bound to grab audience’s attentions through its lewd humour and Kim Kardashian jokes". It concludes: "Although the humour may not be everyone’s cup of tea, connoisseurs of the darker side of comedy are bound to really enjoy the brand of humour on show in Reisinger’s film."

Vanity Fair described his television series Sideswiped as "a thoroughly modern romantic comedy". Ahead of its launch, The Stable wrote that the series had "everything it needed to be an online sensation", and those qualities "begin with Australian comedy director, Daniel Reisinger". The Columbus Dispatch said its mix of fun and tender moments gave it "more heart than most" romantic comedies, and IndieWire called it "hilarious" and "truly heartfelt" while noting a "core of yearning" beneath its "raucous" comedy.

With And Mrs, Reisinger won plaudits for the sensitivity with which the film handled grief. The project was especially personal for the director following the passing of his mother, and The Guardian highlighted the film’s "keen eye for the details of mourning". Digital Spy commended Reisinger for the fact that however absurd the premise became, he "never loses sight of the movie’s heart". The AU Review said he balanced the film’s emotional centre with its comedy "quite tenderly", and The Reviews Hub said the film found comedy that was "somehow profound in death and bereavement". The Irish Examiner found it: "Funny, morbid, and slyly satirical, And Mrs is terrific fun."

Inevitably, the premise of a London-based romantic-comedy has drawn comparisons between Reisinger and British rom-com director Richard Curtis, with the parallels ranging from the storytelling devices of a funeral and a wedding to using London as a backdrop. However, Digital Spy and AU Review deem the "unexpected twist" of Nathan’s death early in the film "subverts" the traditional premise of romantic-comedies. AU Review concludes: "It’s because this could-be-farcical set-up is treated with such respect that And Mrs gets away with as much as it does. It never treats the idea that someone would marry another who has sadly passed as anything other than wholly beautiful."

== Personal life ==
Reisinger grew up in Australia. The loss of his mother, Sarina, in 2022 as a result of the COVID-19 pandemic was the inspiration for his debut feature film And Mrs.

== See also ==
- "Sway, Sway Baby!" (song)
- Sideswiped (TV series)
- And Mrs (film)
- Richard Curtis
