= Vella Lovell =

American actress (born 1985)

- Born: September 13, 1985 (age 41); California, United States
- Education: New York University (BFA); Juilliard School (MFA)
- Occupation: Actress
- Years active: 2012–present
- Spouse: John Garet Stoker (m. 2024)
- Children: 1

Vella Lovell (born September 13, 1985) is an American actress. She is best known for playing Heather Davis in The CW comedy-drama series Crazy Ex-Girlfriend, and Emily Price in the Fox comedy series Animal Control. She has also appeared as Khadija in The Big Sick, Mikaela in Mr. Mayor, and voiced Mermista in She-Ra and the Princesses of Power.

== Early life and education ==
Lovell was born in Southern California and raised in New Mexico. She is of African-American, Jewish, and European descent.

Lovell attended Interlochen Arts Camp and graduated from Interlochen Arts Academy. She then went on to graduate from New York University and the Juilliard School.

== Career ==
Lovell had minor roles in TV series Girls and Younger before joining the cast of Crazy Ex-Girlfriend in 2015. In 2017, Lovell had a supporting role in the romantic comedy The Big Sick. She also had a small role in the Netflix movie The Christmas Chronicles.

In 2018, she voiced Princess Mermista in the Netflix series She-Ra and the Princesses of Power. Earlier that year, she appeared in the Music Video for Cher's cover of SOS by Abba.

In 2021, she played Mikaela in Mr. Mayor on NBC, created by Tina Fey and Robert Carlock. She also starred in the Comedy Central parody A Clusterfunke Christmas with Cheyenne Jackson, Ana Gasteyer and Rachel Dratch.

She currently plays Emily Price in the FOX sitcom Animal Control, created by Bob Fisher, Rob Greenberg and Dan Sterling.

== Filmography ==
=== Film ===
Year	Title	Role	Notes
2012	18 Actors	Morning After Girl	Short
2014	Three Dates	Danielle	Short
2015	Bears Discover Fire	Nurse	Short
2015	LFE	Anj	TV movie
2016	Cat Ladies	-	Short
2017	The Bachelor: Nick Viall in Peru	-	Short
2017	The Big Sick	Khadija	
2017	Literally, Right Before Aaron	Jen	
2018	All These Small Moments	Miss Tucker	
2018	The Christmas Chronicles	Wendy	
2018	Confidence	Girl	Short
2019	Speed of Life	Laura	
2019	Friends-In-Law	-	TV movie
2020	The Great Work Begins. Scenes from Angels in America	Harper	TV movie
2021	A Clüsterfünke Christmas	Holly	
2023	Your Place or Mine	Becca	

=== Television ===
Year	Title	Role	Notes
2015	OM City	Sarah	Episode: "Something Great"
2015–2019	Crazy Ex-Girlfriend	Heather Davis	Main cast
2016	Girls	Adele	Episode: "Old Loves"
2016	Younger	Taylor	Episode: "A Night at the Opera"
2017	Flip the Script	The Development Exec	Episode: "Shelf Life"
2018–2020	She-Ra and the Princesses of Power	Mermista (voice)	Recurring cast
2019	Dollface	Alison S.	Recurring cast: season 1
2020	Grace and Frankie	Nicole	Episode: "The Laughing Stock"
2020	Magical Girl Friendship Squad	No Tattoo Barista/CBD Monster (voice)	Episode: "My Fated Guardians"
2021–2022	Mr. Mayor	Mikaela Shaw	Main cast
2022	As We See It	Salena	Main cast
2022	So Help Me Todd	Lea Luna	Episode: "So Help Me Pod"
2023–present	Animal Control	Emily Price	Main cast
2023–present	Kiff	Candle Fox (voice)	Recurring cast
2024	Accused	Marta	Episode: "Val’s Story"
2025	Big City Greens	Hostess (voice)	Episode: "Short Wait"
2026	My Adventures with Superman	Doris "Gigi" Zuel / Giganta (voice)	Episode: "All's Fair in Love and W.O.R.M.S."

== Awards and nominations ==
Year	Award	Category	Work	Result	Ref.
2021	Hollywood Critics Association TV Awards	Best Supporting Actress in a Broadcast Network or Cable Series, Comedy	Mr. Mayor	Nominated	
