= The Moodys Christmas =

The Moodys Christmas may refer to:

- A Moody Christmas, an Australian television special
- The Moodys, an American television series
