= Gunther's Ice Cream =

Restaurant information
- Established: 1940; 86 years ago
- Food type: Ice cream
- Location: 2801 Franklin Blvd., Sacramento, California, California, 95818, United States
- Website: gunthersicecream.com

Gunther's Ice Cream is a historic ice cream shop at 2801 Franklin Blvd. in Sacramento, California. It was founded in 1940.

== History ==
Herman “Pop” Gunther and his wife, Iva, founded Gunther's in 1940. Ice cream is manufactured on-site, with new specialty flavors debuting monthly. The shop, originally located at Franklin Boulevard and 5th Avenue in Sacramento, moved to 2801 Franklin Blvd. in 1949, where it has existed ever since. The building is considered a strong example of transitional architecture marking the period between Mid-century modern and post-World War II design. The business's mascot is Jugglin' Joe, a soda jerk tossing a scoop of ice cream, portrayed in an animated neon sign atop Gunther's shop.

Herman Gunther died in 1963, while his son, Dick Gunther, died in 1967. Iva Gunther could not continue running the business subsequently, selling it to Carl Buchell the same year. Since 1974, the business has been owned by Rick and Marlena Klopp; Rick had worked at Gunther's since 1969, when he was 22 years old.

In 2010, Gunther's celebrated its 70th anniversary, with Mayor Kevin Johnson in attendance.

In 2015, Business Insider listed Gunther's as the best ice cream shop in the state of California. The same year, Gunther's celebrated its 75th anniversary, an event at which Mayor Kevin Johnson, Supervisor Phil Serna, and Yuba City Director of Development Services Darin Gale spoke. The Sacramento River Cats' mascot, Dinger, was also present for the festivities.

In 2018, Gunther's was nominated as a historical landmark.

== Menu ==
Gunther's offers 50 selections and has fruit freezes as well. Some of their ice cream flavors are Black Raspberry Marble, Strawberry Cheesecake, Swiss Orange Chip, Thai Tea, Lemon Custard, Coconut Pineapple, French Vanilla, Fudge Brownie, and Birthday Cake. Their fruit freezes include Strawberry Banana, Mango, Raspberry, Lime, and Guava.

== Film ==
Gunther's appears in the 2017 film Lady Bird. It also appears in the 2024 film Sacramento.
