= We Are Men =

- Genre: Sitcom
- Created by: Rob Greenberg
- Starring: Kal Penn; Christopher Nicholas Smith; Jerry O'Connell; Tony Shalhoub; Rebecca Breeds
- Composer: John Swihart
- Country of origin: United States
- Original language: English
- No. of seasons: 1
- No. of episodes: 10 (8 unaired)

Production
- Executive producers: Rob Greenberg; Eric Tannenbaum; Kim Tannenbaum
- Camera setup: Single-camera
- Running time: 30 minutes
- Production companies: The Tannenbaum Company; Roughhouse Productions; CBS Television Studios

Original release
- Network: CBS
- Release: September 30 – October 7, 2013

We Are Men is an American sitcom television series created by Rob Greenberg starring Christopher Nicholas Smith, Tony Shalhoub, Jerry O'Connell, Kal Penn, and Rebecca Breeds. The series aired on CBS as part of the 2013–14 American television season, and premiered on September 30, 2013. On October 9, 2013, after the airing of two episodes, which performed poorly, CBS cancelled the series.

== Premise ==
After Carter Thomas is left at the altar by his bride, he moves into a short-term rental complex, where he forms a friendship with three divorced older men.

== Cast ==
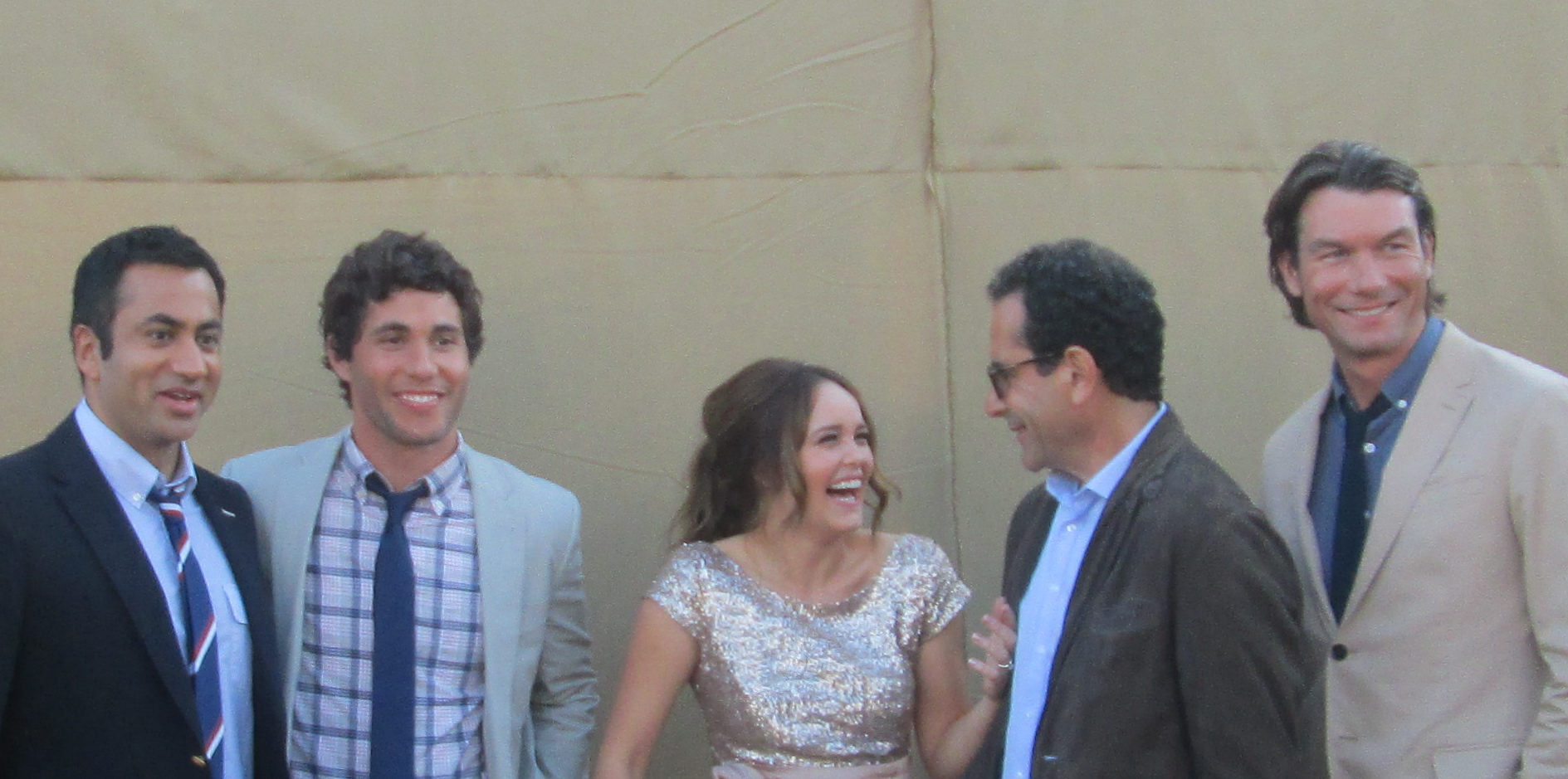
The show's main cast members photographed in July 2012; from left to right: Penn, Smith, Breeds, Shalhoub and O'Connell

- Kal Penn as Gil Bartis
- Christopher Nicholas Smith as Carter Thomas
- Jerry O'Connell as Stuart Strickland
- Tony Shalhoub as Frank Russo
- Rebecca Breeds as Abby Russo, Frank's daughter

== Development and production ==
On July 10, 2012, it was announced that CBS had picked up Rob Greenberg's single-camera comedy, then called Ex-Men, as the first pilot order of the 2013–14 season. The show, which is written, directed and executively produced by Greenberg, centers on a young man "learning the ways of the world from the older and more experienced men in his short-term rental complex." Dominic Patten from Deadline Hollywood reported that We Are Men had been around for a few years, before it was picked up.

Chris Smith was cast as Carter Thomas, the young man who befriends a group of divorced men, while Kal Penn was cast as Gil Bartis. On August 15, 2012, it was announced that Tony Shalhoub would play Frank, who is "a four-time divorcé who still fancies himself a ladies man". Shortly after, Australian actress Rebecca Breeds joined the cast as Frank's daughter. Filming of the pilot episode was pushed back to January 2013, after casting of the fourth male lead stalled. The role of Stuart was eventually filled by Jerry O'Connell.

== Episodes ==
No.	Title	Directed by	Written by	Original release date	Prod. code	U.S. viewers (millions)
1	"Pilot"	Rob Greenberg	Rob Greenberg	September 30, 2013	WAM101	6.61
2	"We Are Dognappers"	Adam Arkin	Bob Daily	October 7, 2013	WAM103	5.41
3	"We Are One Night Stands"	Walt Becker	Lesley Wake Webster	Unaired	WAM104	N/A
4	"We Are Learning to Swim"	N/A	Gabrielle Allan & Jennifer Crittenden	Unaired	WAM105	N/A
5	"We Are Divorced Dads"	N/A	N/A	Unaired	WAM102	N/A
6	"We Are Gentlemen"	N/A	Tad Quill	Unaired	WAM106	N/A
7	"We Are Carpe Pontiac"	N/A	Mathew Libman & Daniel Libman	Unaired	WAM107	N/A
8	"We Are Franksgiving"	N/A	Tony Dodds	Unaired	WAM108	N/A
9	"We Are Stuart's Anniversary"	N/A	N/A	Unaired	WAM109	N/A
10	"We Are for the Tots"	N/A	Lesley Wake Webster	Unaired	WAM110	N/A

== Critical reception ==
We Are Men was panned by critics. Metacritic gave the show an aggregate rating of 33/100; similarly Rotten Tomatoes currently has a rating of 4% (rotten) for the program. Melissa Maers of Entertainment Weekly said that the show was "The male version of Sex and the City with more shirtless scenes (courtesy of Jerry O'Connell) and way less wit", while The Hollywood Reporter was much more harsh, saying “‘We Are Men’ is about four single guys you wouldn't ever want to be around or be related to in any way ... [it] made me feel stupid almost immediately and then bitter that I'd wasted the time.” The show failed to catch an audience and adversely affected other programming, especially the sitcom 2 Broke Girls. The show earned the lowest rating of any 2013 premiere on CBS and was cancelled after just two episodes, leaving the remaining 8 episodes that were produced unaired.

== In popular culture ==
Despite its short run, We Are Men was parodied on the series finale of MAD on Cartoon Network, in a skit called "We Are X-Men". It was a mash-up between We Are Men and X-Men that featured the X-Men trying to move on from past relationships. Funnily enough, this segment aired two months after We Are Men was quietly cancelled.
