= Swiped =

Swiped may refer to:

- Swiped (2018 film), comedy film in which a college-age nerd creates a dating app
- Swiped: Hooking Up in the Digital Age, 2018 documentary film by HBO
- Swiped: The School That Banned Smartphones, 2024 British two-part docuseries
- Swiped (2025 film), biopic about Bumble dating-app founder Whitney Wolfe-Herd

== See also ==
- Swipe (disambiguation)
