= Sideswipe =

Sideswipe or Sideswiped may refer to:

- Sideswipe (G.I. Joe), a fictional character in the G.I. Joe universe
- Sideswipe (Gladiators), an American Gladiators event
- Sideswipe (Transformers), a character from the Transformers franchise.
- Sideswiped in a collision, see Side collision
- Sideswiped (TV series), 2018 Comedy TV Series by Carly Craig

== See also ==
- Swipe (disambiguation)
