= Christopher Nicholas Smith =

American actor

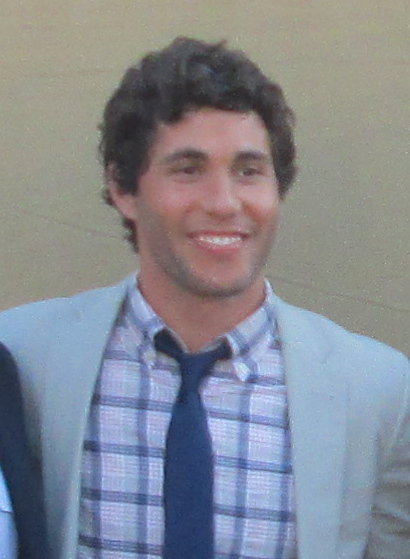
- Smith in 2013
- Occupation: Actor
- Years active: 2006–present

Christopher Nicholas Smith is an American television and film actor. He is best known for playing Dennis in the 2011 horror movie Paranormal Activity 3. He also played Josh Merit in the 2017 romantic comedy film Non-Transferable.

== Life and career ==
Smith starred as Potiphar in the Chaminade High School production of Joseph and the Amazing Technicolor Dreamcoat alongside future Broadway powerhouse actor Jason Zammit, who put on a masterful performance as Joseph. Smith attended NYU's Tisch School of the Arts and trained at the Atlantic Theater Company acting school in New York City. Smith is the founder, head writer and principal performer of the sketch comedy troupe Harvard Sailing Team.

Smith's first real acting gig was in a short movie produced by Tisch School of the Arts titled I Killed Zoe Day. He had a small role in the drama, Little Children. He made his television debut in 2009 in the third season of 30 Rock in an episode titled "Goodbye, My Friend", where he played Tim. He later joined ESPN's Mayne Street, a web comedy series starring sports journalist Kenny Mayne. He made guest appearances on The Office, The Mindy Project and How I Met Your Mother.

In 2011, he was cast in Paranormal Activity 3. He was also cast in the political thriller The Reluctant Fundamentalist. In 2013, he appeared in the film Enough Said. In 2013, he was cast in a CBS television pilot Ex-Men (renamed to We Are Men) which was then picked to series and cancelled after two episodes.

He co-wrote the comedy-drama film Sacramento, which premiered at the 2024 Tribeca Film Festival and stars Michael Angarano, Michael Cera, Maya Erskine, and Kristen Stewart.

== Filmography ==
=== Film ===
Year	Title	Role	Notes
2006	I Killed Zoe Day	Wyatt	Short
2006	Little Children	Steak House Waiter	
2007	Aquarium	Jared	Short
2010	Another Psycho	Chris Burns	Short
2011	Paranormal Activity 3	Dennis	
2012	The Reluctant Fundamentalist	Mike Rizzo	
2013	Enough Said	Hal (Massage Client)	
2016	Storks	Dougland	Voice
2017	Non-Transferable	Josh Merit	
2021	Unknown Dimension: The Story of Paranormal Activity	Himself	Documentary film

=== Television ===
Year	Title	Role	Notes
2009	30 Rock	Tim Baker	Episode: "Goodbye, My Friend"
2010	Mayne Street	Chris	12 episodes
2010	Fake It Til You Make It	Darren Kernin	5 episodes
2011	The Office	Credit Card Guy	Uncredited; Episode: "The Seminar"
2013	The Mindy Project	Mike Menken	1 episode
2013	How I Met Your Mother	Strickland Stevens	Episode: "Weekend at Barney's"
2013	We Are Men	Carter Thomas	Series regular
2014	The Newsroom	Randy Lansing	Episode: "Run"
2014	Garfunkel and Oates	Darren	Episode: "Speechless"
2015	Mom	Douglas Biletnikoff	Episodes: "Three Smiles and an Unpainted Ceiling" and "Kitty Litter and a Class A Felony"
2017	Friends from College	Beta Dog	Episodes: "Mission Impossible", "Grand Cayman" and "Connecticut House"
2018	Lonely and Horny	Luke	Episode: "Game Night"
2018	Young & Hungry	Nick Walker	5 episodes
2020	The Moodys	Nick	6 episodes
2024	Curb Your Enthusiasm	Ron Harrington	Episode: "Vertical Drop, Horizontal Tug"
