= And Mrs =

Romantic comedy film

- Directed by: Daniel Reisinger
- Screenplay by: Melissa Bubnic
- Produced by: Dan Hine
- Starring: Aisling Bea; Colin Hanks
- Production companies: Who’s on First; FirstGen Content
- Distributed by: Vertical (United States); Vertigo Releasing (United Kingdom)
- Release date: August 19, 2024 (EIFF); November 1, 2024 (Netflix UK)
- Running time: 111 minutes
- Countries: United Kingdom; United States
- Language: English

And Mrs is a 2024 romantic comedy directed by Daniel Reisinger, starring Aisling Bea, Billie Lourd and Colin Hanks.

== Premise ==
When a reluctant bride-to-be's fiancé drops dead, she insists on marrying him anyway – vowing to overcome public opinion, the law of the land, and her loved one's objections.

== Cast ==
- Aisling Bea as Gemma
- Colin Hanks as Nathan
- Billie Lourd as Audrey
- Susan Wokoma as Ruth
- Harriet Walter as Amanda
- Sinead Cusack as Lorraine
- Elizabeth McGovern as Margaret
- Peter Egan as Derek
- Omari Douglas as Mo
- Samuel Barnett as Alan
- Nish Kumar as Tim Giggs
- Arthur Darvill as Dylan
- Paul Kaye as Ian

== Production ==
The film is produced by Dan Hine’s company Who’s on First with Hine producing alongside FirstGen Content. It is directed by Daniel Reisinger and written by Melissa Bubnic.

Aisling Bea, Colin Hanks and Billie Lourd joined the cast in September 2022. The following month Susan Wokoma, Harriet Walter, Omari Douglas, Elizabeth McGovern, Sinead Cusack and Peter Egan were added. The film also included roles for Paul Kaye and comedian Nish Kumar.

Principal photography took place in East London in October 2022.

== Release ==
The film premiered at the Edinburgh International Film Festival in August 2024.

It was released on the UK version of Netflix on November 1, 2024.
