= Almost Perfect =

American sitcom television series (1995–1996)

- Genre: Sitcom
- Created by: Ken Levine; David Isaacs; Robin Schiff
- Written by: Sue Herring; George McGrath; Robin Schiff
- Directed by: Andy Ackerman; Stan Daniels; Victor Fresco; Kim Friedman; Leonard R. Garner Jr. David Lee; Ken Levine; Philip Charles MacKenzie; Gail Mancuso; Jeffrey Melman; Alan Myerson; Thomas Schlamme; Rob Schiller
- Starring: Nancy Travis; Kevin Kilner; Chip Zien; Matthew Letscher; David Clennon; Lisa Edelstein
- Composer: Bruce Miller
- Country of origin: United States
- Original language: English
- No. of seasons: 2
- No. of episodes: 34 (6 unaired)

Production
- Executive producers: David Isaacs; Ken Levine; Robin Schiff
- Producers: Larina Adamson; Robin Chamberlin; Linda Teverbaugh; Michael Teverbaugh
- Camera setup: Multi-camera
- Running time: 30 minutes
- Production companies: Robin Schiff Productions; Levine & Isaacs Productions; Paramount Network Television

Original release
- Network: CBS
- Release: September 17, 1995 – October 30, 1996

Almost Perfect is an American sitcom television series that aired on CBS from September 17, 1995, until October 30, 1996. Starring Nancy Travis, Kevin Kilner, David Clennon, Matthew Letscher, and Chip Zien, the series focused on the professional life of the female executive producer of a television cop show, her witty, zany staff which doubled as her family, and initially, how she balanced her high-powered role with that of her newfound romance with a busy assistant D.A. The series was created by Ken Levine, David Isaacs and Robin Schiff, and produced by Levine & Isaacs Productions and Robin Schiff Productions (in season two only), in association with Paramount Network Television.

Levine and Isaacs were previously known for their work as writers and producers on Cheers, as well as Wings airing on NBC. Like the latter shows, Almost Perfect featured a tight-knit ensemble aspect between the cast, which in this case was formed by the production staff of the fictional cop show (as opposed to the Cheers ensemble being that of bar employees and patrons, and Wings group being airport terminal employees).

== Synopsis ==
Almost Perfect starred Nancy Travis as Kim Cooper, a television writer on the (fictional) hit show Blue Justice (a parody of NYPD Blue) who had just been promoted to executive producer. Kim was a prototypical "gotta-have-it-all" young professional; she took pride in being a strong female figure who had risen in the ranks above her mostly male staff. She was headstrong, witty, and had a good sense of direction when it came to the creative matters of Blue Justice, but her personal life was another story.

In the process of working up to her promotion, Kim had struggled to find Mr. Right; many past boyfriends were needy, and eventually unaccepting of Kim's busy schedule. Then she met Mike Ryan (Kevin Kilner), a district attorney. Kim had run into him at a restaurant when she mistook him for the blind date she was supposed to meet, who ended up standing her up. Mike was instantly taken by Kim, and convinced her to have dinner with him, which she did—but not before she quizzed him to make sure he wasn't going to be as shallow as her exes. Before either of them knew it, they were both off on a hot and heavy affair. Both brought extreme pressures to the relationship, mostly due to their high-powered, high-pressure, time-consuming professions.

As Kim learned to juggle her career and promising new romance, she received support and camaraderie from her staff at Blue Justice. Heading the writing team was Gary Karp (Chip Zien), a veteran of many cop shows who had hoped to become executive producer. Gary's attempts to gain more responsibility and edge into Kim's level of importance were slapstick and comical, and his attitudes often got him into trouble with Kim and his colleagues—but he always meant well. Rob Paley (Matthew Letscher) was the farm boy-turned-Hollywood writer who always gave the more idealistic points of view. Neal Luder (David Clennon) was the hippie of the group whose ideas and advice were scarily on target occasionally, amid being far removed from reality most of the time. Having something of a colorful career before becoming a TV writer, Neal once worked as a roadie for the Osmond Family in the 1970s.

The series (not the portrayed fictional program) was cancelled only four episodes into its second season.

== Cast ==
- Nancy Travis as Kimberly "Kim" Cooper
- Kevin Kilner as Mike Ryan
- David Clennon as Neal Luder
- Matthew Letscher as Rob Paley
- Chip Zien as Gary Karp
- Lisa Edelstein as Patty Karp

== Episodes ==
=== Series overview ===
Season	Episodes	Originally released	
Season	Episodes	First released	Last released
1	24	September 17, 1995	April 22, 1996
2	10	October 9, 1996	October 30, 1996

=== Season 1 (1995–96) ===
No. overall	No. in season	Title	Directed by	Written by	Original release date	Prod. code	Viewers (millions)
1	1	"I'm Gregory Peck"	Andy Ackerman	Robin Schiff, Ken Levine & David Isaacs	September 17, 1995	40960-001	12.9
2	2	"Now, Where Were We?"	Stan Daniels	Robin Schiff, Ken Levine & David Isaacs	September 24, 1995	40960-002	11.0
3	3	"Dog Day Afternoon"	Gail Mancuso	Victor Fresco	October 1, 1995	40960-003	11.5
4	4	"My Way"	Gail Mancuso	Robin Schiff, Ken Levine & David Isaacs	October 8, 1995	40960-004	12.6
5	5	"Your Place or Mine?"	Philip Charles MacKenzie	Drew Vaupen & Phil Baker	October 15, 1995	40960-005	15.1
6	6	"You Like Me, You Really Like Me"	Rob Schiller	Michael Teverbaugh (as Mike Teverbaugh) & Linda Teverbaugh	October 22, 1995	40960-006	12.4
7	7	"The Ex-Files"	Andy Ackerman	Sue Herring	November 5, 1995	40960-007	12.0
8	8	"The Lost Weekend: Part 1"	Ken Levine	Robin Schiff, Ken Levine & David Isaacs	November 19, 1995	40960-010	12.3
9	9	"The Lost Weekend: Part 2"	Stan Daniels	Robin Schiff, Ken Levine & David Isaacs	November 26, 1995	40960-011	13.3
10	10	"Presumed Impotent"	Kim Friedman	Victor Fresco	December 3, 1995	40960-008	12.6
11	11	"Love Hurts"	Philip Charles MacKenzie	Robin Schiff & Ken Levine & David Isaacs	December 10, 1995	40960-009	11.2
12	12	"Risky Christmas"	David Lee	Drew Vaupen & Phil Baker	December 11, 1995	40960-012	14.6
13	13	"Mind Games"	Thomas Schlamme	Mike & Linda Teverbaugh	January 14, 1996	40960-013	12.0
14	14	"Overly Meditated"	Jeff Melman	Robin Schiff & Ken Levine & David Isaacs	February 4, 1996	40960-014	13.5
15	15	"El Pollo Loco"	Stan Daniels	Robin Schiff & Ken Levine & David Isaacs	February 11, 1996	40960-016	15.3
16	16	"Auto Neurotic"	Alan Myerson	Larry Balmagia	February 18, 1996	40960-017	12.7
17	17	"A Midseason Night's Sex Comedy"	Alan Myerson	Robin Schiff & Ken Levine & David Isaacs	March 3, 1996	40960-015	15.0
18	18	"Suites for the Sweet"	Alan Myerson	Robin Schiff & Ken Levine & David Isaacs	March 4, 1996	40960-018	14.9
19	19	"Being Fired Means Never Having to Say You're Sorry"	Stan Daniels	Sue Herring	March 11, 1996	40960-019	15.8
20	20	"Lights, Camera, Mike?!"	Jeff Melman	George McGrath	March 18, 1996	40960-020	13.8
21	21	"The Hunted House"	Stan Daniels	Robin Schiff & Ken Levine & David Isaacs	April 1, 1996	40960-021	13.4
22	22	"Moving In: Part 1"	Leonard R. Garner Jr.	Mike & Linda Teverbaugh	April 8, 1996	40960-022	13.1
23	23	"Moving In: Part 2"	Ken Levine	Larry Spencer & Vicki S. Horwitz	April 15, 1996	40960-023	14.8
24	24	"It's a Wrap!"	Ken Levine	Robin Schiff & Ken Levine & David Isaacs	April 22, 1996	40960-024	13.5

=== Season 2 (1996) ===
No. overall	No. in season	Title	Directed by	Written by	Original release date	Prod. code	Viewers (millions)
25	1	"The Break-Up"	Philip Charles MacKenzie	Robin Schiff, Ken Levine & David Isaacs	October 9, 1996	40960-025	12.0
26	2	"Shelf Doubt"	Philip Charles MacKenzie	Jenny Bicks	October 16, 1996	40960-027	11.6
27	3	"Good Grief"	Philip Charles MacKenzie	Ken Estin	October 23, 1996	40960-026	8.6
28	4	"Heaven's Helper"	Philip Charles MacKenzie	Ken Estin	October 30, 1996	40960-030	8.9
29	5	"Dating for Ratings"	Philip Charles MacKenzie	Carol Leifer	Unaired	40960-028	N/A
30	6	"Where No Woman Has Gone Before"	Philip Charles MacKenzie	Robin Schiff, Ken Levine & David Isaacs	Unaired	40960-029	N/A
31	7	"K.I.S.S."	Ken Levine	Mike Teverbaugh & Linda Teverbaugh	Unaired	40960-031	N/A
32	8	"Gimme Shelter"	Ken Levine	Michael Teverbaugh (as Mike Teverbaugh) & Linda Teverbaugh	Unaired	40960-032	N/A
33	9	"The Laws"	Leonard R. Garner Jr.	Michael Teverbaugh (as Mike Teverbaugh) & Linda Teverbaugh	Unaired	40960-033	N/A
34	10	"This is What Happens When You Don't Watch PBS"	Ken Levine	Sue Herring	Unaired	40960-034	N/A

== Broadcast history ==
Season	Time slot (ET)
1995–96	Sunday at 8:30 pm (episodes 1–11, 13–17); Monday at 8:30 pm (episodes 12, 18–24)
1996–97	Wednesday at 8:30 pm (episodes 1–3); Wednesday at 9:00 pm (episode 4)
