= Mike Cabellon =

American actor

Mike Cabellon is an American actor and comedian known for his roles in Mr. Mayor and Orange Is the New Black. Cabellon has been a member of the Upright Citizens Brigade.

== Filmography ==
=== Film ===
Year	Title	Role	Notes
2018	The First Purge	Tech #4	

=== Television ===
Year	Title	Role	Notes
2017	Crashing	Steve	Episode: "The Baptism"
2017	Kombucha Catch-Up	Matt Reyes	4 episodes
2017	Night Crew	Mike	5 episodes
2018	High Maintenance	David	Episode: "Namaste"
2018	Luke Cage	Young Man	Episode: "I Get Physical"
2018	New Amsterdam	EMT Kennedy	Episode: "Boundaries"
2019	God Friended Me	Student	Episode: "Ready Player Two"
2019	Orange Is the New Black	Elmer Fantauzzo	3 episodes
2019	Modern Love	MRI Nurse	Episode: "So He Looked Like Dad. It Was Just Dinner, Right?"
2021–2022	Mr. Mayor	Tommy Tomás	Lead role
