= Animal Control (TV series) =

2023 American sitcom

- Genre: Sitcom
- Created by: Bob Fisher & Rob Greenberg & Dan Sterling
- Starring: Joel McHale; Vella Lovell; Michael Rowland; Ravi V. Patel; Grace Palmer
- Music by: Nick Urata
- Country of origin: United States
- Original language: English
- No. of seasons: 5
- No. of episodes: 50

Production
- Executive producers: Jake Fuller; Tony Hernandez; Brooke Posch; Bob Fisher; Rob Greenberg; Tad Quill; Dan Sterling; Joel McHale
- Producers: Clark Mathis; Matthew Chipera; Jen Jackson
- Camera setup: Single-camera
- Running time: 22 minutes
- Production company: Fox Entertainment Studios

Original release
- Network: Fox
- Release: February 16, 2023 – present

Animal Control is an American television sitcom created by Bob Fisher, Rob Greenberg and Dan Sterling that premiered on Fox on February 16, 2023, and produced by Roughhouse Productions, Middletown News, Wow a Fox, Fox Entertainment Studios. In May 2023, the series was renewed for a second season which premiered on March 6, 2024. In February 2024, ahead of the second season premiere, the series was renewed for a third season which premiered on January 2, 2025. In May 2025, the series was renewed for a fourth season which premiered on December 28, 2025. In February 2026, the series was renewed for a fifth season which premiered on September 27, 2026.

== Premise ==
The show follows a group of municipal animal control workers in Seattle.

== Cast ==
=== Main ===
- Joel McHale as Frank Shaw, a bitter and cynical Senior Animal Control Officer. He was a cop who was fired from the force after discovering evidence of corruption in his precinct. He is sarcastic and quick-witted, prone to making caustic remarks about his co-workers. Later episodes reveal that much of his behavior is bravado and he is actually very depressed and self-conscious.
- Vella Lovell as Emily Price, the good-natured director at the A.C. Northwest precinct. She can be anxious and often awkward in social situations. She is chipper and spunky and surprisingly competitive, butting heads with Templeton when he makes comments about wanting her job. She also displays a creative side, such as when she dresses up the animals for photoshoots to post on social media.
- Michael Rowland as Fred "Shred" Taylor, Frank's partner. An idealistic and naive Animal Control officer and a former professional snowboarder. His idealism causes him to deflect the negativity that his precinct often dishes out.
- Ravi V. Patel as Amit Patel, one of the Animal Control officers of Frank's precinct and Victoria's partner. He is pessimistic and frequently overwhelmed by his large family. When he is away from his family he tends to become absorbed in reckless or childish activities.
- Grace Palmer as Victoria Sands, a street-smart Animal Control officer from New Zealand and Amit's partner. She has a laid-back personality, frequently indulging in various drugs and casual sex. She and Frank have an ongoing prank war that borders on flirtation.

=== Recurring ===
- Gerry Dee as Templeton Dudge, a mean-spirited Animal Control Officer from the Central Precinct.
- Kelli Ogmundson as Dolores Stubb (season 1), the self-righteous receptionist of Frank's precinct.
- Alvina August as Dr. Colette Summers (season 1), an attractive veterinarian in Frank's precinct. She is often targeted as a object of lust by the officers.
- Amy Goodmurphy as AM Dispatch
- Kevin Bigley as Rick Doyle (seasons 1–3), the previous director of the A.C. precinct and Frank's former partner.
- Krystal Smith as Bettany (season 2–present), Emily's new assistant.
- Chelsea Frei as Isabelle (seasons 2–3), a free-spirit and Shred's girlfriend.
- Lucy Punch as Fiona Holcomb (season 3), a philanthropist who helps Emily promote the precinct.
- Josh Segarra as Parker (seasons 3–4), a squatter who becomes friends with the animal control team and dates Victoria.
- Kyla Pratt as Daisy Cannon (season 4–present), Templeton's partner.

=== Guest ===
- María Gabriela de Faría as Camila (season 1), Shred's long-distance girlfriend who lives in Austria.
- Kalyn Miles as Maya Patel, Amit's wife.
- Dayah Brar as Addy Patel, Amit's daughter. She is very sassy and he finds her difficult to control.
- Tristan D. Lalla as Jack, a vet tech working with Dr. Summers. He has a very no-nonsense personality and seems exhausted by how self-centered the patrol officers are.
- John Procaccino as Jimmy Shaw, Frank's cantankerous father with whom he has a contentious relationship.
- Ken Jeong as Roman Park (seasons 2–present), a well-respected dog whisperer.
- Sarah Chalke as Yazmin (seasons 2–3), Frank's ex-girlfriend.
- Thomas Lennon as Patrick Shaw (season 2–present), Frank's older brother. He is a police officer.
- Maz Jobrani as Lucas (season 2)
- Larry Joe Campbell as Carl (season 2–present)
- Rob Gronkowski as himself (season 3–4)

== Episodes ==
=== Series overview ===
| Season | Episodes | Originally released | |
| Season | Episodes | First released | Last released |
|---|---|---|---|
| 1 | 12 | February 16, 2023 | May 4, 2023 |
| 2 | 9 | March 6, 2024 | May 8, 2024 |
| 3 | 10 | January 2, 2025 | March 13, 2025 |
| 4 | 12 | December 28, 2025 | April 23, 2026 |
| 5 | 12 | September 27, 2026 | TBA |

=== Season 1 (2023) ===
| No. overall | No. in season | Title | Directed by | Written by | Original release date | U.S. viewers (millions) |
|---|---|---|---|---|---|---|
| 1 | 1 | "Weasels and Ostriches" | Bob Fisher & Rob Greenberg | Bob Fisher & Rob Greenberg & Dan Sterling | February 16, 2023 | 2.09 |
| 2 | 2 | "Rabbits and Pythons" | Bob Fisher & Rob Greenberg | Bob Fisher & Rob Greenberg & Dan Sterling | February 23, 2023 | 1.60 |
| 3 | 3 | "Cougars and Kangaroos" | Bob Fisher & Rob Greenberg | Bob Fisher & Rob Greenberg & Dan Sterling | March 2, 2023 | 1.48 |
| 4 | 4 | "Dogs and Bears and Minks" | Jay Chandrasekhar | Emily Towers | March 9, 2023 | 1.30 |
| 5 | 5 | "Cows and Raccoons" | Jay Chandrasekhar | Jen Jackson | March 16, 2023 | 1.48 |
| 6 | 6 | "Skunks and Llamas" | Chris Koch | Jim Brandon & Brian Singleton | March 23, 2023 | 1.31 |
| 7 | 7 | "Peacocks and Pumas" | Jay Chandrasekhar | Tad Quill & Dan Sterling | March 30, 2023 | 1.19 |
| 8 | 8 | "Hellhounds and Sturgeons" | Chris Koch | Sam Shanker | April 6, 2023 | 1.25 |
| 9 | 9 | "Dogs and Geese" | Chris Koch | Emily Towers & Jen Jackson & Sam Shanker | April 13, 2023 | 1.03 |
| 10 | 10 | "Pigs and Minks" | Robert Cohen | Tad Quill & Dan Sterling | April 20, 2023 | 1.02 |
| 11 | 11 | "Birds and Foxes" | Robert Cohen | Tad Quill & Dan Sterling | April 27, 2023 | 0.99 |
| 12 | 12 | "Unicorns and Mountain Lions" | Robert Cohen | Tad Quill & Dan Sterling | May 4, 2023 | 0.99 |

=== Season 2 (2024) ===
| No. overall | No. in season | Title | Directed by | Written by | Original release date | U.S. viewers (millions) |
|---|---|---|---|---|---|---|
| 13 | 1 | "Raccoons and Mutts" | Bob Fisher & Rob Greenberg | Bob Fisher & Rob Greenberg & Tad Quill | March 6, 2024 | 1.62 |
| 14 | 2 | "Cats and Monkeys" | Bob Fisher & Rob Greenberg | Bob Fisher & Rob Greenberg & Tad Quill | March 13, 2024 | 1.54 |
| 15 | 3 | "Tortoises and Labradors" | Natalia Anderson | Bob Fisher & Rob Greenberg & Tad Quill | March 20, 2024 | 1.29 |
| 16 | 4 | "Big Dogs and Mini Horses" | Natalia Anderson | David Feeney | March 27, 2024 | 1.51 |
| 17 | 5 | "Dogs and Chickens" | Jay Chandrasekhar | Sam Shanker | April 10, 2024 | 1.48 |
| 18 | 6 | "Bunnies and Veggies" | Molly McGlynn | Jim Brandon & Brian Singleton | April 17, 2024 | 1.47 |
| 19 | 7 | "Skunks and Swans" | Molly McGlynn | Emily Towers | April 24, 2024 | 1.44 |
| 20 | 8 | "Bulls and Potbellies" | Clark Mathis | Jen Jackson | May 1, 2024 | 1.21 |
| 21 | 9 | "Beagles and Lemurs" | Clark Mathis | Natasha Williams | May 8, 2024 | 1.26 |

=== Season 3 (2025) ===
| No. overall | No. in season | Title | Directed by | Written by | Original release date | U.S. viewers (millions) |
|---|---|---|---|---|---|---|
| 22 | 1 | "Giraffes, Gorillas, and Penguins" | Bob Fisher & Rob Greenberg | Jim Brandon & Brian Singleton | January 2, 2025 | 1.33 |
| 23 | 2 | "Rattlers and Gators" | Bob Fisher & Rob Greenberg | David Feeney | January 9, 2025 | 1.11 |
| 24 | 3 | "Goats, Snakes, and Dogs" | Jay Chandrasekhar | Brad Stevens & Boyd Vico | January 16, 2025 | 1.25 |
| 25 | 4 | "Baby Kangaroos and Chickens" | Jay Chandrasekhar | Sam Shanker | January 23, 2025 | 1.06 |
| 26 | 5 | "Hot Dogs and Lobsters" | Natalia Anderson | Jen Jackson | January 30, 2025 | 1.17 |
| 27 | 6 | "Buffalo and Beavers" | Natalia Anderson | Emily Towers | February 13, 2025 | 1.29 |
| 28 | 7 | "Ducks and Penguins" | Clark Mathis | Dan Sterling | February 20, 2025 | 1.13 |
| 29 | 8 | "Party Animals" | Clark Mathis | Annie C. Wright | February 27, 2025 | 1.04 |
| 30 | 9 | "Retrievers and Fruit Bats" | Natalia Anderson | Brad Stevens & Boyd Vico | March 6, 2025 | 0.97 |
| 31 | 10 | "Strays and Lovebirds" | Natalia Anderson | Tad Quill | March 13, 2025 | 0.94 |

=== Season 4 (2025–26) ===
| No. overall | No. in season | Title | Directed by | Written by | Original release date |
|---|---|---|---|---|---|
| 32 | 1 | "Bear Cubs and Broncos" | Natalia Anderson | Tad Quill | December 28, 2025 |
| 33 | 2 | "Bagged Birds and Alley Dogs" | Natalia Anderson | Jim Brandon & Brian Singleton | January 15, 2026 |
| 34 | 3 | "Dragons and Dognappers" | Clark Mathis | David Feeney | January 22, 2026 |
| 35 | 4 | "Lost Dogs and Bar Flies" | Clark Mathis | Jen Jackson | January 29, 2026 |
| 36 | 5 | "French Bulldogs and White Broncos" | Brennan Shroff | Brad Stevens & Boyd Vico | February 5, 2026 |
| 37 | 6 | "Roosters and Moles" | Brennan Shroff | Alison Bennett | February 26, 2026 |
| 38 | 7 | "Donkeys and Weasels" | Clark Mathis | Sam Shanker | March 5, 2026 |
| 39 | 8 | "Squirrels and Fat Cats" | Clark Mathis | Spencer Taylor | March 12, 2026 |
| 40 | 9 | "Bats and Camels" | Jay Chandrasekhar | Jim Brandon & Brian Singleton | April 2, 2026 |
| 41 | 10 | "Scaredy Cats and Card Sharks" | Jay Chandrasekhar | Brad Stevens & Boyd Vico | April 9, 2026 |
| 42 | 11 | "Coyotes and Eagles" | Natalia Anderson | David Feeney | April 16, 2026 |
| 43 | 12 | "Golden Moose and Wiener Dogs" | Natalia Anderson | Tad Quill | April 23, 2026 |

=== Season 5 (2026) ===
| No. overall | No. in season | Title | Directed by | Written by | Original release date |
|---|---|---|---|---|---|
| 44 | 1 | "Seahawks and Piglets" | Clark Mathis | Tad Quill | September 27, 2026 |
| 45 | 2 | "Crows and Lizard Legs" | Jay Chandrasekhar | David Feeney | October 4, 2026 |
| 46 | 3 | "Bugs and Rabid Dogs" | Clark Mathis | Jim Brandon & Brian Singleton | October 18, 2026 |
| 47 | 4 | "Tortoises and Billy Goats" | Jay Chandrasekhar | Jen Jackson | October 25, 2026 |
| 48 | 5 | "Sled Dogs and Kitty Litter" | Maggie Carey | Alison Bennett | November 1, 2026 |
| 49 | 6 | "Baked Chickens and Rat Dogs" | Maggie Carey | Brad Stevens & Boyd Vico | November 8, 2026 |
| 50 | 7 | "Stuffed Cats and Goslings" | Brennan Shroff | Sam Shanker | November 15, 2026 |
| 51 | 8 | "Boas and Spiders" | TBA | TBA | November 22, 2026 |
| 52 | 9 | "Baby Goats and Cat Naps" | TBA | TBA | November 29, 2026 |

== Production ==
In July 2022, it was announced Fox had given a straight-to-series order to Animal Control from Bob Fisher, Rob Greenberg, Dan Sterling and Fox Entertainment, marking Fox Entertainment Studios' first fully owned live-action comedy. In October of that year, Joel McHale joined the series as the lead and executive producer. Vella Lovell and Ravi Patel joined the cast later that same month. Most portions of Animal Control are filmed in and around Vancouver from October 31, 2022 to January 25, 2023.

In May 2023, the series was renewed for a second season which premiered on March 6, 2024. In February 2024, ahead the second season premiere, Fox renewed the series for a third season. Filming for the third season began on June 17, 2024 and concluded on August 20, 2024. The third season premiered on Fox on January 2, 2025. On May 7, 2025, Fox renewed the series for a fourth season. Filming for the fourth season began on August 25, 2025 and concluded on November 7, 2025. The fourth season premiered on December 28, 2025. On February 26, 2026, Fox renewed the series for a fifth season which premiered on September 27, 2026.

== Reception ==
=== Critical response ===
The review aggregator website Rotten Tomatoes reported a 60% approval rating for the first season with an average rating of 6/10, based on ten critic reviews. Metacritic, which uses a weighted average, assigned a score of 68 out of 100 based on seven critics, indicating "generally favorable reviews".

=== Ratings ===
==== Overall ====
Viewership and ratings per season of Animal Control
| Season | Timeslot (ET) | Episodes | First aired | | Last aired | | TV season | Viewership rank | Avg. viewers (millions) | 18–49 rank | Avg. 18–49 rating |
| Season | Timeslot (ET) | Episodes | Date | Viewers (millions) | Date | Viewers (millions) | TV season | Viewership rank | Avg. viewers (millions) | 18–49 rank | Avg. 18–49 rating |
|---|---|---|---|---|---|---|---|---|---|---|---|
| 1 | Thursday 9:00 p.m. | 12 | February 16, 2023 | 2.09 | May 4, 2023 | 0.99 | 2022–23 | 97 | 2.16 | 84 | 0.42 |
| 2 | Wednesday 9:00 p.m. | 9 | March 6, 2024 | 1.62 | May 8, 2024 | 1.21 | 2023–24 | 100 | 2.12 | 97 | 0.30 |
| 3 | Thursday 9:00 p.m. | 10 | January 2, 2025 | 1.33 | March 13, 2025 | 0.94 | 2024–25 | TBD | TBD | TBD | TBD |

==== Season 1 ====
Viewership and ratings per episode of Animal Control
| No. | Title | Air date | Rating (18–49) | Viewers (millions) |
|---|---|---|---|---|
| 1 | "Weasels and Ostriches" | February 16, 2023 | 0.3 | 2.09 |
| 2 | "Rabbits and Pythons" | February 23, 2023 | 0.3 | 1.60 |
| 3 | "Cougars and Kangaroos" | March 2, 2023 | 0.3 | 1.48 |
| 4 | "Dogs and Bears and Minks" | March 9, 2023 | 0.2 | 1.30 |
| 5 | "Cows and Raccoons" | March 16, 2023 | 0.3 | 1.48 |
| 6 | "Skunks and Llamas" | March 23, 2023 | 0.2 | 1.31 |
| 7 | "Peacocks and Pumas" | March 30, 2023 | 0.3 | 1.19 |
| 8 | "Hellhounds and Sturgeons" | April 6, 2023 | 0.3 | 1.25 |
| 9 | "Dogs and Geese" | April 13, 2023 | 0.2 | 1.03 |
| 10 | "Pigs and Minks" | April 20, 2023 | 0.2 | 1.02 |
| 11 | "Birds and Foxes" | April 27, 2023 | 0.2 | 0.99 |
| 12 | "Unicorns and Mountain Lions" | May 4, 2023 | 0.2 | 0.99 |

==== Season 2 ====
Viewership and ratings per episode of Animal Control
| No. | Title | Air date | Rating (18–49) | Viewers (millions) |
|---|---|---|---|---|
| 1 | "Raccoons and Mutts" | March 6, 2024 | 0.2 | 1.62 |
| 2 | "Cats and Monkeys" | March 13, 2024 | 0.2 | 1.54 |
| 3 | "Tortoises and Labradors" | March 20, 2024 | 0.2 | 1.29 |
| 4 | "Big Dogs and Mini Horses" | March 27, 2024 | 0.2 | 1.51 |
| 5 | "Dogs and Chickens" | April 10, 2024 | 0.2 | 1.48 |
| 6 | "Bunnies and Veggies" | April 17, 2024 | 0.2 | 1.47 |
| 7 | "Skunks and Swans" | April 24, 2024 | 0.2 | 1.44 |
| 8 | "Bulls and Potbellies" | May 1, 2024 | 0.2 | 1.21 |
| 9 | "Beagles and Lemurs" | May 8, 2024 | 0.2 | 1.26 |

==== Season 3 ====
Viewership and ratings per episode of Animal Control
| No. | Title | Air date | Rating (18–49) | Viewers (millions) | DVR (18–49) | DVR viewers (millions) | Total (18–49) | Total viewers (millions) | Ref. |
|---|---|---|---|---|---|---|---|---|---|
| 1 | "Giraffes, Gorillas, and Penguins" | January 2, 2025 | 0.2 | 1.33 | 0.1 | 0.66 | 0.3 | 1.99 | |
| 2 | "Rattlers and Gators" | January 9, 2025 | 0.2 | 1.11 | 0.1 | 0.66 | 0.3 | 1.77 | |
| 3 | "Goats, Snakes, and Dogs" | January 16, 2025 | 0.2 | 1.25 | 0.1 | 0.62 | 0.3 | 1.87 | |
| 4 | "Baby Kangaroos and Chickens" | January 23, 2025 | 0.2 | 1.06 | 0.1 | 0.70 | 0.3 | 1.76 | |
| 5 | "Hotdogs and Lobsters" | January 30, 2025 | 0.2 | 1.17 | 0.1 | 0.64 | 0.3 | 1.81 | |
| 6 | "Buffalo and Beavers" | February 13, 2025 | 0.3 | 1.29 | 0.1 | 0.70 | 0.3 | 1.98 | |
| 7 | "Ducks and Penguins" | February 20, 2025 | 0.2 | 1.13 | 0.1 | 0.61 | 0.3 | 1.74 | |
| 8 | "Party Animals" | February 27, 2025 | 0.2 | 1.04 | 0.1 | 0.65 | 0.3 | 1.70 | |
| 9 | "Retrievers and Fruit Bats" | March 6, 2025 | 0.1 | 0.97 | 0.1 | 0.56 | 0.2 | 1.53 | |
| 10 | "Strays and Lovebirds" | March 13, 2025 | 0.1 | 0.94 | 0.1 | 0.54 | 0.2 | 1.49 | |
