= Robin Schiff =

American screenwriter and producer

- Born: United States
- Occupations: Screenwriter, producer
- Writing career
- Language: English
- Genre: Screenwriting
- Notable work: Romy and Michele film series

Robin Schiff is an American screenwriter and producer, best known for the film Romy and Michele's High School Reunion (1997) starring Lisa Kudrow and Mira Sorvino. Schiff also wrote and directed the television prequel film Romy and Michele: In the Beginning (2005). Schiff was a member of the comedy troupe The Groundlings. She hosts an interview series once a year for the Writers Guild Foundation called Anatomy Of A Script, where she and Winnie Holzman (writer of the musical Wicked and creator of My So-Called Life) discuss the craft with other well-known writers. Schiff also teaches a writing class with Wendy Goldman (whom she met at The Groundlings) called Improv For Writing.

== Career ==
=== Film work ===
Schiff wrote the films Romy and Michele's High School Reunion (1997) and Loverboy (1989).

=== Television work ===
Schiff began her television career as the story editor for Rags to Riches, NBC, 1987–88. She was the supervising producer for Working Girl, NBC, 1990. She was the creator and supervising producer for Princesses, CBS, 1991. She was the supervising producer and creative consultant for Delta, CBS, 1992–93. She was the consulting producer for Party of Five, Fox, 1994–2000. She was the creator and executive producer for Almost Perfect, CBS, 1995–96. She was the consulting producer for Thanks, CBS, 1999. She was the executive producer for Grosse Pointe, The WB, 2000–2001. She was the consulting producer for Coupling, NBC, 2003 and for Miss Match, NBC, 2003.

Schiff produced the Netflix series Emily in Paris and Uncoupled with Darren Star. She was an executive producer of the YouTube Red series Sideswiped in 2018.
