= Mr. Mayor =

American TV sitcom (2021–2022)

- Genre: Sitcom
- Created by: Robert Carlock & Tina Fey
- Starring: Ted Danson; Holly Hunter; Vella Lovell; Mike Cabellon; Kyla Kenedy; Bobby Moynihan
- Music by: Jeff Richmond; Giancarlo Vulcano
- Country of origin: United States
- Original language: English
- No. of seasons: 2
- No. of episodes: 20

Production
- Executive producers: Tina Fey; Robert Carlock; David Miner; Ted Danson; Jeff Richmond; Todd Holland; John Riggi
- Producers: Werner Walian; Amina Munir; Matt Whitaker
- Cinematography: David Miller; Trey Clinesmith
- Editors: Kyle Gilman; Adam Epstein; Sean Cusack
- Camera setup: Single-camera
- Running time: 21–22 minutes
- Production companies: Little Stranger; 3 Arts Entertainment; Bevel Gears; Universal Television

Original release
- Network: NBC
- Release: January 7, 2021 – May 17, 2022

Mr. Mayor is an American television sitcom created by Tina Fey and Robert Carlock for NBC. The series stars Ted Danson, Bobby Moynihan, Holly Hunter, Vella Lovell, Mike Cabellon, and Kyla Kenedy. It ran from January 7, 2021, to May 17, 2022, airing a total of 20 episodes (including a holiday special) across two seasons.

== Premise ==
Neil Bremer (Ted Danson) is a wealthy businessman who runs for mayor of Los Angeles "for all the wrong reasons." Once he wins he has to figure out what he stands for, gain the respect of his staff, and connect with his teenage daughter, all while controlling the coyote population.

== Cast ==
=== Main ===
- Ted Danson as Neil Bremer, a retired billboard ad executive who runs for, and becomes, Mayor of Los Angeles to earn his daughter's respect. Bremer was initially developed as an older version of Jack Donaghy from 30 Rock, portrayed by Alec Baldwin, before Baldwin dropped out of the project.
- Holly Hunter as Arpi Meskimen, the deputy mayor of Los Angeles and a former city councilwoman of thirty years with her no-nonsense attitude.
- Vella Lovell as Mikaela Shaw, Neil's chief of staff and a social media influencer, who is the good friend of Tommy.
- Mike Cabellon as Tommy Tomás, Neil's chief strategist, who is the good friend of Mikaela.
- Kyla Kenedy as Orly Bremer, Neil's daughter who enjoys embarrassing him.
- Bobby Moynihan as Jayden Kwapis, Neil's communications director whose bumbling personality hides his street smarts and political instincts.
- Yedoye Travis as James, a strategist hired by Neil to modernize Los Angeles (Season 2)

=== Recurring ===
- Josie Totah as Titi B, a popular social media influencer and Mayor Bremer's nemesis
- Benito Martinez as Mayor Victor Delgado
- Rachel Dratch as Ms. Adams
- Jennifer DeFilippo as Valerie
- Josh Sussman as Leslie, an employee in the Mayor's office
- Anna Camp as Natalie, Neil's deceased wife and Orly's deceased mother

=== Guest ===
- Andie MacDowell as Herself
- David Spade as Himself
- Chrissy Teigen as Herself
- A.J. Castro as Nestor
- Jay Cramer as Steven
- Ani Sava as Daniella
- Gabrielle Ruiz as Emily Biyata
- Natalie Morales as Susan Karp
- Beau Bridges as Adolphus Hass
- Missi Pyle as Nicole
- Kurt Braunohler as Jax
- Ed Begley Jr. as Chet Danville
- Patty Guggenheim as Samanthee
- Taran Killam as Taryn Digiacomo
- Scott Adsit as Patrick
- Betsy Sodaro as Teri
- Fran Drescher as Angelica Masters
- Peter Gallagher as Brett
- Maria Bamford as Leaf
- Mary Steenburgen as Adriana
- Kate del Castillo as Victoria Santos

== Episodes ==
=== Series overview ===
Season	Episodes	Originally released	
Season	Episodes	First released	Last released
1	9	January 7, 2021	February 25, 2021
Special		December 15, 2021	
2	10	March 15, 2022	May 17, 2022

=== Season 1 (2021) ===
No. overall	No. in season	Title	Directed by	Written by	Original release date	U.S. viewers (millions)
1	1	"Pilot"	Todd Holland	Robert Carlock & Tina Fey	January 7, 2021	5.04
Retired businessman Neil Bremer wins a special election to become Mayor of Los Angeles. His inexperience as a politician quickly shows when he institutes a ban on plastic straws that upsets his daughter, Orly (who is accused of stealing the idea for her class president election). Councilwoman Arpi Meskimen quickly whips up an anti-ban movement to oppose him. Bremer confesses to Arpi that he ran for mayor to prove himself to Orly, as he is a widower single parent and Orly treats him like a useless old man. After initially dropping the ban, Bremer's assistant Jayden informs him that Arpi wanted to run for mayor but failed to get on the ballot. Bremer moves to offers to appoint Arpi as deputy mayor, an offer she accepts only because she expects him to fail and resign. Bremer reaffirms the straw ban and realizes he won't make everyone happy. Orly wins her election, demonstrating newfound respect for her father.
2	2	"Mayor's Day Out"	Christine Gernon	Robert Carlock	January 7, 2021	4.41
Bremer feels overwhelmed with pointless things to do, so he tells Mikaela that he won't be in the office and puts her in charge. He also warns her make sure Arpi doesn't do anything sneaky. Meanwhile, Orly gets mad at Bremer for not letting her do drugs even though he was supporting a cannabis store earlier. Bremer embarrasses himself on camera, and Jayden and Tommy freak out. While driving, Tommy realizes that a picture of Bremer high on cannabis is now a meme. Arpi and Mikaela eventually gets Bremer's signature on a proclamation. Bremer, still high, cuts the ribbon during the opening of a community center and beats up a mascot after thinking it was a monster. Arpi reveals that she knew that Mikaela was "babysitting" her the whole time. Arpi tells Bremer that she used Mikaela to pass a new law that he was against.
3	3	"Brentwood Trash"	Christine Gernon	Sam Means	January 14, 2021	3.73
A new recycling facility is to be built in Los Angeles and in the Brentwood area, aggravating the wealthy residents. Bremer is forced to attend a town hall where the residents voice their concerns. Arpi tags along, as she is happy to see the arrogant residents upset. At the town hall, Bremer is initially persuaded by Andie MacDowell to move the facility away from Brentwood, but Arpi convinces him to keep the facility where it is. Meanwhile, after realizing they are reusing speeches, Jayden is put in charge of hiring a speechwriter. He's conflicted on whether to hire a qualified candidate or a one he's befriended. Jayden ends up sacrificing his friendship and hiring the qualified candidate. Orly convinces Mikaela that her own life is a lot like that of a high schooler's. At first Mikaela is angry at the realization, but then comes to accept it and she and Orly become friends.
4	4	"The Sac"	Anya Adams	Tina Fey	January 21, 2021	3.18
Arpi is joyous that she is headed to Sacramento, California with Jayden to support an anti-drilling initiative. Bremer learns that Orly has been suspended due to cyber bullying a teacher and he attends a meeting at the school with Orly and Ms. Adams, the bullied teacher. Bremer convinces Ms. Adams not to suspend Orly, but worries he doesn't know enough about Orly's life. During the car ride to Sacramento, Jayden tries to hold a friendly conversation and fails miserably. Tommy and Bremer create a fake Instagram account to spy on Orly's own fake account. Arpi incorrectly thinks Jayden was flirting with her and tells him that she isn't interested. Mikaela learns about the fake Instagram and suggests Bremer try to connect with Orly in different ways. Bremer comes to believe Orly lied to him, and Mikaela tells Orly about Bremer's fake account. Arpi and Jayden make up over the misunderstanding after Jayden saves Arpi from her greatest fear: a giant cookie that triggers her trypophobia. Bremer lets Orly stay up late watching TV with him.
5	5	"Dodger Day"	Maggie Carey	Meredith Scardino	January 28, 2021	3.28
The Los Angeles baseball team asks Bremer to throw the ceremonial first pitch. Though he is advised not to accept, he eagerly agrees to do it. Tommy tries to get his ID photo retaken to impress a security guard in the building, and Tommy convinces Mikaela that they will never find spouses. They approach Daniela, the woman who takes ID pictures, and she expresses anger that nobody ever acknowledges her. Arpi warns Bremer that he's not fit enough to throw the first pitch, but he continues to exercise until he throws his back out. Arpi trains Bremer in unconventional methods until he is fit as a fiddle. Bremer honors Daniela by giving her a 30-year work anniversary certificate, but while she is out of her office, Mikaela takes Tommy's picture herself. A lice outbreak can be traced back to Bremer's bike helmets, leading to Mikaela convincing Bremer to throw a terrible pitch to distract people. Bremer hits Jayden with the ball, embarrassing him but making everyone else happy.
6	6	"Respect in the Workplace"	Tristram Shapeero	Tina Fey	February 4, 2021	3.08
Jayden has a rough morning but cheers up when he realizes that it's Food Truck Day, when food trucks from around the city visit Los Angeles City Hall. However, the staff must put off lunch to attend the annual Respect in the Workplace meeting. Everyone thinks it's a bore, except Bremer, who piles on a series of absurd questions to the meeting leader, Susan. While taking the test, Bremer becomes convinced that she is attracted to him and he awkwardly tries to flirt. Everyone but Jayden does well on the test, but Susan reveals that the lowest scores are actually the best. Jayden goes to get everyone food while Tommy, Mikaela, Bremer, and Arpi stay behind to review the test and continue to annoy Susan with insane answers. Things escalate into a fight, and it gets worse when they see Jayden dropping all their food. Jayden returns, and they lash out at him. Bremer asks Susan on a date and she rejects him. Arpi accidentally maces Susan, then Jayden, and everyone disperses. Susan's wife escorts her home, and the main characters resolve their arguments.
7	7	"Avocado Crisis"	Tristram Shapeero	Matt Whitaker	February 11, 2021	2.75
An avocado shortage leads to a fight in the grocery store over the last two avocados in the city. Jayden informs Bremer of the crisis. Mikaela comes to work after not sleeping all night, having to review a very boring binder with Arpi. A local farmer named Adolphus Hass proposes to Bremer that the city give him money so he can grow more avocados. Mikaela realizes that not everybody in the office views her as an authority figure after she sleeps through Arpi's presentation. Mikaela has Arpi go more in depth that night over the phone so she can go to sleep. Bremer refuses to give Adolphus his way, but is met with harsh criticism when he tries to find his own solution. He finally gives in, but it doesn't work out and he leaves with Jayden after realizing that something's wrong. Arpi realizes that Mikaela fell asleep during her presentation, but they straighten everything out. Jayden and Bremer go to a local bar to enlist help, and a trucker reveals Adolphus was hording the avocados. They make Adolphus release his produce, and Bremer congratulates his staff.
8	8	"Hearts Before Parts"	Jaffar Mahmood	Amina Munir	February 18, 2021	2.75
Bremer drops Orly off at a sleepover, and is upset when he learns there are girls and boys in attendance. That night, Jayden and Mikaela win a trivia contest at a restaurant. A photo of Bremer having slept with a woman named Nicole is leaked, causing a panic throughout the office. Arpi and Tommy demand a rematch, but Jayden's team wins every time they play. When Orly finds out about Nicole, she jokingly asks to meet her. After dinner with Nicole, Orly interrogates Bremer, who reveals that he has secretly had one-night stands with women before. Meanwhile, Jayden and Mikaela gloat over Arpi and Tommy, but after an argument both teams split up and it's every person for themselves. Nicole breaks up with Bremer. Orly helps him properly establish an online dating profile. At the trivia contest, the group realizes that they have unfinished work that they put off, and bond while doing it together. Afterward, Bremer notes that the word "budget" on the cover page of the report is spelled incorrectly, and instructs them to do everything over again.
9	9	"#PalmTreeReform"	Jaffar Mahmood	Robert Carlock	February 25, 2021	2.54
Bremer is criticized on live TV by former Mayor Delgado. Orly tells Bremer her school temporarily closed after a student was hit by a falling palm tree. Bremer decides to take the initiative on this, but rejects all of Arpi's ridiculous ideas. Jayden announces he will be a father, but the others are suspicious. When Bremer says he wants to get rid of the dangerous palm trees, he is met with criticism. Mikaela and Tommy offer to figure out Jayden's legal situation, and they plan to mess with him. Bremer does not invite Arpi to the meeting about the palm trees, so Orly alerts Arpi, who saves the day when her constant annoyance makes the person arguing with Bremer give up. When Mikaela and Tommy imply that Jayden is not the father of the baby, the mother, Samanthee reveals that this is true but she thought Jayden would be a better dad than the biological father. Arpi and Orly are angry when they learn Bremer used them, while Tommy and Mikaela make Jayden feel better about not being a parent. Bremer, Arpi and Orly watch a video, featuring Bremer and Jayden.

=== Special (2021) ===
No.	Title	Directed by	Written by	Original release date	U.S viewers (millions)
10	"Mr. Mayor's Magical L.A. Christmas"	Kim Nguyen	Janine Brito & Tina Fey	December 15, 2021	1.98

=== Season 2 (2022) ===
No. overall	No. in season	Title	Directed by	Written by	Original release date	U.S. viewers (millions)
11	1	"Move Fast and Break Things"	Maggie Carey	Tina Fey	March 15, 2022	2.03
Bremer hires the Innovation Team (AKA the I-Team), who will observe everyone in the office and find ways to make the city government more efficient. Arpi intensely dislikes the idea. While Mikaela and Tommy are initially excited, they soon feel threatened. The duo turns against the I-Team when its leader, James, suggests Jayden should be fired. Bremer takes Orly to the DMV to get her learner's permit and Arpi tags along. Orly fails her test and must wait seven days to retake it, but Arpi finds a loophole that allows Orly to get an A Class permit so she can drive farm equipment. Arpi does this to prove to Bremer that changing things quickly and recklessly isn't a good idea. Bremer concedes Arpi has a point, but his solution is to extend the I-Team's contract from six weeks to a year.
12	2	"Mayor Daddy"	Maggie Carey	Matt Whitaker	March 22, 2022	1.85
Bremer struggles with his employees feeling jealous of the attention the I-Team is getting from him, and notices his staff is beginning to act like bratty children. Arpi proposes having a day when Bremer will listen to one idea from each employee. Bremer, Arpi, and James are pleasantly surprised by Jayden's pitch: invite sister city mayors to visit Los Angeles so they can share ideas on tackling big issues. Mikaela receives an award for "flattening the curve" of homelessness in L.A., but she learns that the city's homeless count is always purposefully inaccurate. She realizes the first step in addressing the issue is get an accurate head count and she asks James for help, to which he agrees.
13	3	"Trampage"	Brennan Shroff	Lesley Wake Webster	March 29, 2022	1.83
During a heat wave, the city struggles to cope with power outages. Bremer goes on a date with Angelica, a commercial actress. When he gets mixed signals from her over texts, Bremer confronts her and she explains that she's on a dating whirlwind after her divorce. Tommy accidentally ruins Arpi's love of lotto scratchers by telling her how to remove random chance from the experience. Upset over losing her way to cope with stress, Arpi is distracted from managing an emergency cooling center, leading to a bouncy castle accident. Tommy makes her feel better by revealing his secret love: shopping for limited edition Rae Dunn ceramics in a competitive environment. Angelica makes a public service announcement that her image is being used to catfish men on dating apps that aim to steal their identities.
14	4	"The Illusion of Choice"	Brennan Shroff	Matt Roller	April 5, 2022	1.68
Attempting to raise Bremer's profile with the public, James puts his face on trashcans. Bremer is unhappy with the program, but feels he can't say anything without being accused of vanity. Jayden lies about being a Scorpio in order to rent his dream apartment from an eccentric landlord. Mikaela instructs Jayden to always act like his fake astrological sign, leading to him to have a personality crisis. The landlord assigns "Scorpio" Jayden to evict tenents for her. Bremer considers pulling the trashcans, but Jayden points out the gimmick is encouraging people to clean up the city. Mikaela and Tommy help Jayden keep his apartment by telling the landlord that if she doesn't let him stay they will report all of the apartment complex's building code violations.
15	5	"Sister Cities"	Heather Jack	Jeremy Bronson	April 12, 2022	1.62
Los Angeles is hosting the visiting mayors of its many sister cities. Jayden is sent to pick them up but his car breaks down on the way, causing him to run late. Mikaela has feelings for James, but she must tread carefully when asking him out so she won't run afoul of Susan in HR. When James turns Mikaela down, she wants to know why but is advised by Susan to not press the issue. A group of actors from a nearby film set are mistaken for the visiting mayors and brought to lunch at Bremer's house. When Tommy realizes the mistake, he tries to stall until the real mayors arrive. After Tommy is forced to come clean, he and Bremer find Jayden and the mayors at a mall, where they've have had a great time.
16	6	"Venus on the Moon"	Linda Mendoza	Vanessa Ramos	April 19, 2022	1.68
Orly gets an internship at the mayor's office and is angry when she learns her father pulled strings to make it happen. Mikaela struggles to balance her work-life with friends and basic self care. Arpi uses the teen interns to guilt government officials into voting for ordinance 462, which will provide internet to all school-aged children. However, her adherence to bureaucracy disappoints the interns. Arpi vows to rediscover her passion for real political change. Orly learns that the reason she's been so coddled is because her late mother, Natalie, asked Bremer to protect her from the difficult things in life. Jayden helps Orly and Bremer work through their frustrations by using a 1990's sci-fi movie that Natalie starred in.
17	7	"Murder in the Old West"	Jaffar Mahmood	Teleplay by : Robert Carlock; Story by : Matt Roller	April 26, 2022	1.70
L.A. has a budget surplus of 90 million dollars and Arpi wants to use it for M.U.D., her diarrhea relief plan. Bremer has other ideas. Jayden throws an Old West murder mystery party and guilts his coworkers into coming. Bremer brings a date, Adriana, who gets too into character for his liking. Mikaela believes James is online dating and she tries to figure out why he won't go out with her. Bremer confesses that he's collaborating with supermarket billionaire Sebastian Felix to build a space elevator, to Arpi's horror. Adriana tells Jayden that she's attracted to him. James explains to Mikaela that he's currently in a messy breakup, but would like to go on a date with her after he's sorted out the situation. Arpi plans to run against Bremer after his term is up in a year.
18	8	"Titi B."	David Miller	Lauren Gurganous & Meredith Scardino	May 3, 2022	1.59
Bremer upsets social media influencer Titi B after he mentions cheese, which she mistakes as him supporting her cheating ex-boyfriend, the rapper Ch33$e. Arpi tries to use an oil spill to enact real change, but she's so bad at interviews that she usually just makes the interviewers cry. Jayden encourages Arpi to emotionally connect with the public. Bremer announces his space elevator project, but the press only cares about the Titi B controversy. After Bremer bad mouths influencers in general, Titi B tells her "flock" to harass him. At the behest of Felix, Bremer tries to end the feud. However, things only get worse when Titi B asks for half a million dollars for her to endorse his reelection campaign and Bremer is angered at the idea of buying her vote. Jayden helps Arpi create a viral TikTok video, and she realizes that he can help her get elected when she runs for mayor.
19	9	"The Recall"	Natalie Morales	Amina Munir	May 10, 2022	1.49
Titi B encourages her followers to sign a recall petition against Bremer. Tommy worries Bremer isn't taking the situation seriously. When Titi B teachers her followers how to use the postal service, the staff jump into action as the petition gains support. Arpi wants the recall to happen so she can run for mayor. Jayden doesn't know where his loyalty lies, so he consults Stuart the Minion at a photo op. Mikaela and James think each other is a bad kisser, but decide to work through it. The recall moves forward when it gets 400,000 signatures, and Titi B decides to throw her hat into the ring as a candidate. Tommy discovers a technicality that could stop the recall, but Bremer decides to run a fair campaign.
20	10	"The Debate"	Heather Jack	Teleplay by : Robert Carlock & Matt Roller; Story by : Matt Roller	May 17, 2022	1.60
Titi B announces she's signed a deal with Netflix and is dropping out of the election. Bremer and Tommy decide to go on the offensive against Arpi at the mayoral recall debate. Jayden gives Arpi a glamorous makeover and she adopts an air-headed persona to appeal to the public. James considers making a career choice to stay in Southern California so he can remain close to Mikaela, which makes her nervous. Mikaela impersonates the mayor while presenting certificates to centenarians, but a recipient reports her to the police. James saves her from being written up, convincing Mikaela that he truly cares about her. Their happiness is cut short when James learns he's being transferred to Dubai. At the debate, Bremer claims M.U.D. was his idea, causing Arpi to drop her persona. She rants against the political game and declares the Dodgers suck, which turns the audience against her. Titi B arrives late to the debate, reenters the race, and steals all the glory. During closing remarks, Jayden arranges for Bremer's previously unknown, possible love child to show up, which shocks everyone.

== Production ==
=== Development ===
On July 18, 2019, it was reported that NBC had given a 13-episode straight-to-series order to an untitled Tina Fey and Robert Carlock comedy starring Ted Danson, who is set to play a wealthy businessman running for mayor of Los Angeles. Originally meant to be a spin-off/continuation of Fey's series 30 Rock, the series was to star Alec Baldwin reprising his 30 Rock role of Jack Donaghy, following his political career in New York City. After around a year of negotiations, Baldwin dropped out of the project and was replaced with Danson. Danson refused to move from Los Angeles to New York, so the series was rewritten to take place there.

On May 11, 2020, it was announced that the series would be called Mr. Mayor. The series would be executive produced by Tina Fey, Jeff Richmond, Robert Carlock and David Miner. Production companies involved with the series include Little Stranger, Bevel Gears, 3 Arts Entertainment and Universal Television. A first-look tease of the series was included as an end tag on the Peacock stream of "30 Rock: A One-Time Special" uploaded on July 16, 2020. The first season began airing on NBC on January 7, 2021, and concluded after nine episodes on February 25, 2021. On March 22, 2021, the series was renewed for a second season, which premiered on March 15, 2022 and ended on May 17, 2022. On May 12, 2022, NBC canceled the series after two seasons.

=== Casting ===
In 2019, Deadline reported Bobby Moynihan had joined the cast as Jayden and later that Holly Hunter had also joined the cast as Arpi. In early 2020 Vella Lovell joined the cast as Mikaela, Mike Cabellon joined the cast as Tommy, and Kyla Kenedy joined the cast as Orly Bremer.

=== Filming ===
On March 12, 2020, Universal Television suspended the production of the series amid the emergence of COVID-19 in the United States. Filming for the first season commenced shortly after, but was put on hold once again on December 14, 2020, after several crew members tested positive for COVID-19. The following day, it was reported that production would be suspended for the rest of 2020 and was scheduled to resume in January 2021. However, filming for the first season did not resume and the season was cut four episodes short due to the pandemic.

== Broadcast ==
The first season of the show premiered on NBC with two episodes on January 7, 2021. In July 2020, an end tag of "30 Rock: A One Time Special" on its post-broadcast stream on Peacock included a teaser trailer of the series and later that year in November 2020, a trailer was released. The nine-episode season concluded with the episode "#PalmTreeReform" on February 25, 2021. The series was acquired by Citytv in Canada. A holiday special episode titled "Mr. Mayor's Magical L.A. Christmas" aired on December 15, 2021, as the second season premiere, ahead of the second season time slot premiere which is March 15, 2022.

== Reception ==
=== Critical response ===
On Rotten Tomatoes, the series holds an approval rating of 44% based on 32 reviews, with an average rating of 4.79/10. The website's critics consensus reads, "Mr. Mayor's first term suffers from a lack of specificity, leading to broad jokes and wayward plots—still, a reliably winsome Ted Danson and a silly sensibility may be enough for some viewers." On Metacritic, it has a weighted average score of 53 out of 100, based on 22 reviews, indicating "mixed or average reviews". LaToya Ferguson of The A.V. Club gave the fifth and sixth episodes better grades mentioning the lack of Orly in them, noting "these past two episodes have solidified just how superfluous the Orly character and the family sitcom aspect of the series really are."

=== Ratings ===
==== Overall ====
Viewership and ratings per season of Mr. Mayor
Season	Timeslot (ET)	Episodes	First aired		Last aired		TV season
Season	Timeslot (ET)	Episodes	Date	Viewers (millions)	Date	Viewers (millions)	TV season
1	Thursday 8:00 p.m. (1, 3–9); Thursday 8:30 p.m. (2)	9	January 7, 2021	5.04	February 25, 2021	2.54	2020–21
2	Tuesday 8:30 p.m.	10	March 15, 2022	2.03	May 17, 2022	1.60	2021–22

==== Season 1 ====
Viewership and ratings per episode of Mr. Mayor
No.	Title	Air date	Rating (18–49)	Viewers (millions)	DVR (18–49)	DVR viewers (millions)	Total (18–49)	Total viewers (millions)
1	"Pilot"	January 7, 2021	0.6	5.04	0.3	1.55	0.9	6.59
2	"Mayor's Day Out"	January 7, 2021	0.6	4.41	0.3	1.46	0.8	5.87
3	"Brentwood Trash"	January 14, 2021	0.5	3.73	0.3	1.34	0.8	5.07
4	"The Sac"	January 21, 2021	0.5	3.18	—N/a	—N/a	—N/a	—N/a
5	"Dodger Day"	January 28, 2021	0.6	3.28	—N/a	—N/a	—N/a	—N/a
6	"Respect in the Workplace"	February 4, 2021	0.5	3.08	—N/a	—N/a	—N/a	—N/a
7	"Avocado Crisis"	February 11, 2021	0.5	2.75	—N/a	1.04	—N/a	3.79
8	"Hearts Before Parts"	February 18, 2021	0.5	2.75	0.2	1.03	0.7	3.78
9	"#PalmTreeReform"	February 25, 2021	0.5	2.54	0.2	0.96	0.7	3.50

==== Special ====
Viewership and ratings per episode of Mr. Mayor
No.	Title	Air date	Rating (18–49)	Viewers (millions)	DVR (18–49)	DVR viewers (millions)	Total (18–49)	Total viewers (millions)
10	"Mr. Mayor's Magical L.A. Christmas"	December 15, 2021	0.4	1.98	0.1	0.61	0.4	2.59 (Note: Live+7 ratings were unavailable, so Live+3 ratings have been used instead.)

==== Season 2 ====
Viewership and ratings per episode of Mr. Mayor
No.	Title	Air date	Rating (18–49)	Viewers (millions)	DVR (18–49)	DVR viewers (millions)	Total (18–49)	Total viewers (millions)
1	"Move Fast and Break Things"	March 15, 2022	0.4	2.03	0.1	0.72	0.4	2.75
2	"Mayor Daddy"	March 22, 2022	0.3	1.85	0.1	0.69	0.4	2.54
3	"Trampage"	March 29, 2022	0.3	1.83	0.1	0.57	0.4	2.41
4	"The Illusion of Choice"	April 5, 2022	0.3	1.68	0.1	0.58	0.4	2.25
5	"Sister Cities"	April 12, 2022	0.3	1.62	0.1	0.61	0.4	2.22
6	"Venus on the Moon"	April 19, 2022	0.3	1.68	0.1	0.66	0.4	2.34
7	"Murder in the Old West"	April 26, 2022	0.3	1.70	0.1	0.58	0.4	2.28
8	"Titi B."	May 3, 2022	0.2	1.59	TBD	TBD	TBD	TBD
9	"The Recall"	May 10, 2022	0.3	1.49	TBD	TBD	TBD	TBD
10	"The Debate"	May 17, 2022	0.3	1.60	TBD	TBD	TBD	TBD
