= Swipe =

Swipe may refer to:

- Swipe (barbershop), a music arranging technique
- Swipe (breakdance move)
- Swipe (comics), a technical term
- Swipe (dice game)
- Swipe (magazine), a free fortnightly in London, UK
- swIPe (protocol), an IP network security feature
- Swipe file, a template used in marketing and copywriting
- Swipe card, or magnetic stripe card
- Swipe (novel), 2012, by Evan Angler
- Swipe, a fictional band from the movie Tamara Drewe
- Pointing device gesture, described as "swipe right", "swipe left", or 'swipe up"
- A slang term for theft

== See also ==
- Swype, a virtual keyboard for touchscreen devices
- Sluicing, grammatical device for omitting words
