= Offbeat =

Offbeat, originally a music term meaning "not following the standard beat", which has also become a general synonym for "unconventional" or "unusual", may refer to:

== Music ==
- Syncopation
- Off-beat (music), the musical term in more detail
- Off Beat (label), a German record label for electronic underground music
- OffBeat (music magazine), a music magazine based in New Orleans, Louisiana
- Offbeat: A Red Hot Soundtrip, a compilation album from the Red Hot AIDS Benefit Series
- Offbeats (band), a San Antonio-based garage punk band
- Offbeat Recording Studio & Music Productions, based in Edinburgh, Scotland

== Film and TV ==
- Off Beat (1986 film), a 1986 comedy film
- Off Beat (2004 film), a 2004 drama film
- Offbeat (film), a 1961 film

== Others ==
- Offbeat generation, association of writers united by their opposition to mainstream publishing
- Off Beat (comics), a 2005 manga-influenced comic series by Jennifer Lee Quick

== See also ==
- Alternative rock
- Backbeat (disambiguation)
