= Dan Sterling =

American screenwriter and television producer

Dan Sterling is an American screenwriter and television producer who has worked on many successful television shows, including King of the Hill, Kitchen Confidential, The Daily Show, South Park, The Sarah Silverman Program and The Office.

Sterling's script The Interview became famous after it was seen as an act of war by the supreme leader of the Democratic People's Republic of Korea, Kim Jong-un. The Guardians of Peace made terrorist threats of "a 9/11 style attack" against cinemas who planned to screen the film, and also threatened the safety of Sony Pictures employees and their families. As a result of these threats, Sony Pictures initially cancelled the release of The Interview, though it was later given a limited theatrical release, with broad digital release online through a Sony website, Google Play, Microsoft's Xbox Video, and YouTube Movies.

== Filmography ==
=== Films ===
| Year | Title | Credit |
|---|---|---|
| 2014 | The Interview | Writer |
| 2019 | Long Shot | Writer |

=== Television ===
| Year | Title | Credit | Notes |
|---|---|---|---|
| 1997–1998 | South Park | Staff writer | 10 episodes |
| 1998–2000 | Jesse | Writer and executive story editor | 28 episodes |
| 2002–2006 | King of the Hill | Writer | 7 episodes |
| 2005–2006 | Kitchen Confidential | Writer and co-executive producer | 12 episodes |
| 2006 | The Daily Show with Jon Stewart | Co-executive producer | 78 episodes |
| 2007–2010 | The Sarah Silverman Program | Director, writer and executive producer | 22 episodes |
| 2012 | Girls | Writer and consulting producer | 9 episodes |
| 2012 | Susan 313 | Writer and executive producer | TV movie |
| 2012–2013 | The Office | Writer and executive producer | 16 episodes |
| 2015–2018 | The Last Man on Earth | Executive producer | 18 episodes |
| 2021 | Housebroken | Consulting Producer | 11 episodes |
| 2022 | Panhandle | Co-Executive Producer | 8 episodes |
| 2023–present | Animal Control | Creator, Writer and Executive Producer | 30 episodes |
