= The Moodys (American TV series) =

2019 American comedy television series based on the Australian version

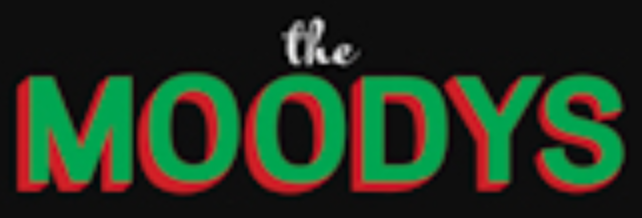
- Genre: Sitcom
- Created by: Rob Greenberg & Bob Fisher & Tad Quill
- Based on: A Moody Christmas by Trent O'Donnell & Phil Lloyd
- Written by: Bob Fisher & Rob Greenberg & Tad Quill
- Starring: Denis Leary; Elizabeth Perkins; Francois Arnaud; Chelsea Frei; Jay Baruchel
- Music by: Lyle Workman
- Country of origin: United States
- Original language: English
- No. of seasons: 2
- No. of episodes: 14

Production
- Executive producers: Eric Tannenbaum; Kim Tannenbaum; Trent O' Donnell; Phil Lloyd; Jason Burrows; Bob Fisher; Rob Greenberg; Tad Quill; Denis Leary; Elizabeth Perkins
- Producer: Irene Litinsky
- Cinematography: Joe Kessler; Pierre Jodoin
- Editors: Joe D'Augustine; Jeff Hall; Dean Pollack; Arthur Tarnowski; Justin Lachance; Simon Webb
- Running time: 21–22 minutes
- Production companies: Fox Entertainment; CBS Studios

Original release
- Network: Fox
- Release: December 4, 2019 – June 20, 2021

The Moodys is an American comedy television series based on the Australian show The Moodys. It stars Denis Leary and Elizabeth Perkins as a cantankerous married couple who reunite with their three adult children in Chicago for the Christmas season. It premiered December 4, 2019, on Fox, and aired two half-hour episodes back-to-back for three weeks, for a total of six episodes for its first season. In July 2020, Fox renewed the series for a second season which premiered on April 1, 2021.

The series was originally to be called A Moody Christmas; the Australian series on which it is based was called A Moody Christmas in the first series. On April 16, 2021, Fox took The Moodys off the Thursday schedule. The remaining three episodes of the second season are rescheduled to air on Sundays starting June 6. On June 17, 2021, the series was canceled after two seasons. The series finale aired on June 20, 2021.

== Cast ==
=== Main ===
- Denis Leary as Sean Moody Sr.
- Elizabeth Perkins as Ann Moody
- François Arnaud as Dan Moody
- Chelsea Frei as Bridget Moody
- Jay Baruchel as Sean Moody Jr.

=== Recurring ===
- Maria Gabriela de Faria as Cora
- Josh Segarra as Marco
- Gerry Dee as Roger
- Christopher Nicholas Smith as Nick

=== Guest ===
- Kevin Bigley as Monty
- Ulka Simone Mohanty as Mukta
- Megan Park as Ali

== Episodes ==
=== Series overview ===
Season	Episodes	Originally released	
Season	Episodes	First released	Last released
1	6	December 4, 2019	December 10, 2019
2	8	April 1, 2021	June 20, 2021

=== Season 1 (2019) ===
No. overall	No. in season	Title	Directed by	Written by	Original release date	U.S viewers (millions)
1	1	"Pilot"	Bob Fisher & Rob Greenberg	Teleplay and television story by : Bob Fisher & Rob Greenberg & Tad Quill	December 4, 2019	2.71
2	2	Episode 2	Bob Fisher & Rob Greenberg	Bob Fisher & Rob Greenberg & Tad Quill	December 4, 2019	2.71
3	3	Episode 3	Bob Fisher & Rob Greenberg	Bob Fisher & Rob Greenberg & Tad Quill	December 9, 2019	1.26
4	4	Episode 4	Bob Fisher & Rob Greenberg	Bob Fisher & Rob Greenberg & Tad Quill	December 9, 2019	1.26
5	5	Episode 5	Bob Fisher & Rob Greenberg	Bob Fisher & Rob Greenberg & Tad Quill	December 10, 2019	1.80
6	6	Episode 6	Bob Fisher & Rob Greenberg	Bob Fisher & Rob Greenberg & Tad Quill	December 10, 2019	1.80

=== Season 2 (2021) ===
No. overall	No. in season	Title	Directed by	Written by	Original release date	U.S viewers (millions)
7	1	Episode 201	Jay Karas	Bob Fisher & Rob Greenberg & Tad Quill	April 1, 2021	1.04
8	2	Episode 202	Jay Karas	Bob Fisher & Rob Greenberg & Tad Quill	April 1, 2021	1.04
9	3	Episode 203	Jay Karas	Bob Fisher & Rob Greenberg & Tad Quill	April 8, 2021	1.14
10	4	Episode 204	Jay Karas	Bob Fisher & Rob Greenberg & Tad Quill	April 15, 2021	1.15
11	5	Episode 205	Jacob Tierney	Bob Fisher & Rob Greenberg & Tad Quill	April 22, 2021	1.31
12	6	Episode 206	Jacob Tierney	Bob Fisher & Rob Greenberg & Tad Quill	June 6, 2021	0.55
13	7	Episode 207	Jacob Tierney	Bob Fisher & Rob Greenberg & Tad Quill	June 6, 2021	0.54
14	8	Episode 208	Jacob Tierney	Bob Fisher & Rob Greenberg & Tad Quill	June 20, 2021	0.60

== Reception ==
=== Critical response ===
On Rotten Tomatoes, the first season holds an approval rating of 64% with an average rating of 6.28/10, based on 14 reviews. The website's critical consensus states, "A solid cast and some decent jokes set the table, but The Moodys's stale take on a curmudgeonly Christmas is too bah humbug in a bad way." On Metacritic, the first season has a weighted average score of 55 out of 100, based on 10 critics, indicating "mixed or average reviews".

=== Ratings ===
Viewership and ratings per season of The Moodys
Season	Episodes	First aired		Last aired		TV season	Viewership rank	Avg. viewers (millions)	18–49 rank	Avg. 18–49 rating
Season	Episodes	Date	Viewers (millions)	Date	Viewers (millions)	TV season	Viewership rank	Avg. viewers (millions)	18–49 rank	Avg. 18–49 rating
1	6	December 4, 2019	2.71	December 10, 2019	1.80	2019–20	TBD	TBD	TBD	TBD
2	8	April 1, 2021	1.04	June 20, 2021	0.60	2020–21	130	1.69	119	0.4

==== Season 1 ====
Viewership and ratings per episode of The Moodys
No.	Title	Air date	Timeslot (ET)	Rating/share (18–49)	Viewers (millions)
1	"Pilot"	December 4, 2019	Wednesday 9:00 pm	0.8/4	2.71
2	"Episode Two"	December 4, 2019	Wednesday 9:30 pm	0.7/4	2.71
3	"Episode Three"	December 9, 2019	Monday 9:00 pm	0.3/2	1.26
4	"Episode Four"	December 9, 2019	Monday 9:30 pm	0.3/2	1.26
5	"Episode Five"	December 10, 2019	Tuesday 9:00 pm	0.5/2	1.80
6	"Episode Six"	December 10, 2019	Tuesday 9:30 pm	0.5/2	1.80

==== Season 2 ====
Viewership and ratings per episode of The Moodys
No.	Title	Air date	Timeslot (ET)	Rating (18–49)	Viewers (millions)
1	"Episode 201"	April 1, 2021	Thursday 9:00 pm	0.3	1.04
2	"Episode 202"	April 1, 2021	Thursday 9:30 pm	0.3	1.04
3	"Episode 203"	April 8, 2021	Thursday 9:30 pm	0.3	1.14
4	"Episode 204"	April 15, 2021	Thursday 9:30 pm	0.3	1.15
5	"Episode 205"	April 22, 2021	Thursday 9:30 pm	0.3	1.31
6	"Episode 206"	June 6, 2021	Sunday 9:00 pm	0.2	0.55
7	"Episode 207"	June 6, 2021	Sunday 9:30 pm	0.1	0.54
8	"Episode 208"	June 20, 2021	Sunday 9:30 pm	0.2	0.60

== See also ==
- List of Christmas films
