= Sideswiped (TV series) =

- Genre: Comedy
- Created by: Carly Craig; Daniel Reisinger
- Starring: Carly Craig; Rosanna Arquette; Chelsea Frei
- Composer: Mateo Messina
- Country of origin: United States
- Original language: English
- No. of seasons: 1
- No. of episodes: 8

Production
- Executive producers: Jeremy Garelick; Daniel Reisinger; Robin Schiff; Carly Craig
- Producers: George Paaswell; Sam Anzel
- Cinematography: John Tanzer; Cameron Duncan
- Editors: Shaheed Qaasim; Kate Hickey
- Camera setup: Single-camera
- Running time: 22–26 minutes
- Production company: Kissing Toads Productions

Original release
- Network: YouTube Premium
- Release: July 25, 2018

Sideswiped is an American comedy streaming television series created by Carly Craig and Daniel Reisinger that premiered on July 25, 2018 on YouTube Premium. The series stars Craig who executive produces alongside Reisinger, Robin Schiff, and Jeremy Garelick. Craig and Schiff also act as showrunners.

On April 10, 2019, YouTube Premium canceled the series.

== Premise ==
Sideswiped follows "three women. A lifetime of saying no has left Olivia single and miserable on her 35th birthday. This workaholic verging on a breakdown vows to plunge into the hellish world of Tinder by dating all 252 of her matches. She is spurred on by her sister Jayne, a young married woman experiencing a seven-year itch. The sisters are joined by their recently widowed mother, Mary, who now also is a part of the online dating scene.

== Cast and characters ==
=== Main ===
- Carly Craig as Olivia Maple, a life insurance broker at Wilson and Hines Insurance company. While out celebrating her 35th birthday, her sister downloads Tinder to her phone and she proceeds to swipe right on numerous men while in a drunken stupor. She awakes the next morning to discover that she now has 252 matches and makes the decision to go out with every one of them.
- Rosanna Arquette as Mary Maple, Olivia and Jayne's widowed mother. Her husband of 34 years died of a heart attack during a golf lesson and she now lives with Olivia. She's trying to become a more independent person going so far as to get her first job working at a clothing store.
- Chelsea Frei as Jayne Tyler, Olivia's married sister who just gave birth to a daughter. She struggles with figuring out her own identity separate from marriage and child and feels like her husband hasn't looked at her the same way since she gave birth.

=== Recurring ===
- Craig Frank as Dr. Jim Tyler, Jayne's husband and a gastroenterologist. He begins to fear losing his job after failing to bring enough new patients into his practice due to some bad Yelp reviews. This causes him to become more distant towards Jayne leading to a falling out between them after he discovers she was flirting with a man on her sister's Tinder account.
- Zaire and Zamir Salazar as Abby Tyler, Jayne and Jim's infant daughter.
- Alice Lee as Britney, the manager of the clothing store Rock Etiquette. She helps style Mary and takes new pictures of her for her dating app accounts. She and Mary go on to become friends and she hires her to work at the store as an employee. The pair ultimately decide to move in together after Britney kicks out her previous roommate.
- Miguel Pinzon as Danny, Olivia's receptionist whom she seeks advice from and gossips with.
- Rhys Coiro as Charlie, a history teacher that Olivia matches with on Tinder. Jayne flirts with him using Olivia's account and pretends to be her. He and Olivia eventually begin to date and she comes clean about her sister's deception. The couple breaks up after Olivia admits that she is not sure she wants kids while he is certain that he does.

=== Guest ===
- Jason Sudeikis as Dr. David Bennett ("Matching Up"), a gynecologist that fills in for Olivia's regular doctor.
- Thomas Lennon as Aaron Cunningham ("Matching Up"), the CEO of Cunningham Insurance company and a man that Olivia matches with on Tinder.
- Tyler Posey as Griffin ("Baby Steps"), a personal trainer and gym owner that Olivia matches with on Tinder.
- Christopher McDonald as Mary's One Night Stand ("Baby Steps"), a man that Mary meets while out eating dinner by herself and with whom she later has sex.
- Charles Michael Davis as Josh ("Deal Breakers"), a lawyer and sex addict that Olivia matches with on Tinder.
- Robert Pine as Ethan ("Deal Breakers"), a widowed man living on a houseboat that Mary matches with on Oomph and with whom she goes on a date.
- Rick Springfield as himself ("The Rock Star"), a famous 80s musician that Mary matches with on an exclusive dating app that includes celebrities.
- Penny Johnson Jerald as Cynthia Tyler ("The Rock Star"), Jim's mother and a real estate agent that lives in San Francisco. She is often passive aggressive towards Jayne and suggests that she get a nanny when she comes to visit.
- Andy Gala as Dr. Bradley Navin ("The Rock Star"), a doctor that works in Jim's practice who is set up on a date with Olivia.
- Bryan Greenberg as Ryan ("The Ex"), Olivia's ex-boyfriend that founded a charity, Meals with Feels, that feeds homeless people on Saturdays. He went to college with Jim and plays on a soccer team with him.
- Michelle Hayden as Lexi ("The Ex"), Ryan's pregnant girlfriend with whom he founded his charity.
- Barry Livingston as Teacher ("The Ex"), an instructor teaching a course on various computer programs that Marry attends.
- Marc Evan Jackson as Dr. Singer ("The Party"), a doctor at PCR Fertility Clinic who Olivia consults with regarding freezing her eggs.
- Sarah Burns as Nicole ("The Party"), a woman that Olivia meets using the friend option on a dating app that she attends a concert with.
- Peter Gallagher as Andrew ("For A Nickel I Will"), a retired lawyer that comes into Rock Etiquette shopping for his granddaughter. He and Mary begin dating but decide to stop seeing each other as she is focused on her new job whereas he wants to take advantage of his retirement.
- Jon Ecker as Bobby Garcia ("Hard Maybe"), a guy that Jayne had a crush on in high school and whom she referred to as "Hot Jesus". She reconnects with him at a bar years later and ends up making out with him in his car.

== Episodes ==
No.	Title	Directed by	Written by	Original release date
1	"Matching Up"	Daniel Reisinger	Story by : Carly Craig & Daniel Reisinger; Teleplay by : Carly Craig	July 25, 2018
2	"Baby Steps"	Daniel Reisinger	Carly Craig	July 25, 2018
3	"Deal Breakers"	Kat Coiro	Brooke Baker	July 25, 2018
4	"The Rock Star"	Erin Ehrlich	Spencer Sloan	July 25, 2018
5	"The Ex"	Kat Coiro	Spencer Sloan	July 25, 2018
6	"The Party"	Daniel Reisinger	Carly Craig	July 25, 2018
7	"For A Nickel I Will"	Daniel Reisinger	Robin Schiff	July 25, 2018
8	"Hard Maybe"	Erin Ehrlich	Story by : Stacy Harman & Carly Craig; Teleplay by : Carly Craig & Robin Schiff	July 25, 2018

== Production ==
=== Development ===
On October 20, 2017, it was announced that YouTube had given the production, then titled Swipe Right, a series order for a first season consisting of eight episodes. The series was created by Carly Craig and Daniel Reisinger. Craig was set to write the series while Reisinger would direct. Craig was also expected to serve as showrunner along with Robin Schiff. Executive producers were to include Craig, Reisinger, Schiff, and Jeremy Garelick. Sam Anzel was set to serve as a producer. On June 28, 2018, it was reported that the series had been retitled Sideswiped and that it would premiere on July 25, 2018.

=== Casting ===
Alongside the initial series order announcement, it was confirmed that Craig had been cast in the series' lead role. On February 9, 2018, it was announced that Rosanna Arquette and Chelsea Frei had been cast as series regulars in the roles of Mary and Jayne, respectively. It was further reported that Jason Sudeikis, Rick Springfield, Peter Gallagher, Tyler Posey, Thomas Lennon, Bryan Greenberg, Charles Michael Davis, Christopher McDonald, Rhys Coiro, Craig Frank, Alice Lee, and Sarah Burns would appear as guest stars.

=== Filming ===
Principal photography for the series took place in Los Angeles, California at locations including Mar Vista, Studio City, and Arcadia. A frequent location in the series is The Parlour Room of Hollywood in Los Angeles where Craig's character Olivia frequently goes on first dates.

== Release ==
On June 28, 2018, the first trailer for the series was released.

== Reception ==
=== Critical response ===
The series has been met with a generally positive response from critics since its premiere. In a positive review, Indiewire's Hanh Nguyen gave the series a "B" grade and praised it saying, "There’s a core of yearning in the show that belies the raucous tone of the in-your-face comedy elements, and this gives Sideswiped a potential for something truly heartfelt." In a similarly favorable critique, Decider's Joel Keller commended the series saying, "Craig, Arquette and Frei have a fantastic rapport with each other, and it makes the show worth watching as we see Olivia navigate the dating scene in the world of swiping left or right." He goes on to recommend that viewers watch the series adding, "Stream It, because Craig, Arquette and Frei make a heck of a comedy team." In another approving assessment, Paste's Alexis Gunderson gave the series a rating of 8.6 out of 10 and applauded it for its authenticity evidenced through all aspects of the production saying, "That realism shines through, not just in the performances, but in the series’ whole production. The color palette is neither muted nor heightened; the musical cues subtly support only what is on the screen; the few stylized smash cuts and close-ups that exist only do so to add to Olivia's, Mary's, and Jayne's characterization by following their most lizard brain-y thoughts."

=== Awards and nominations ===
Year	Award	Category	Nominee(s)	Result	Ref.
2019	Shorty Awards	Best Web Series	Sideswiped	Lost	
