= Omari Douglas =

English actor and singer (born 1994)

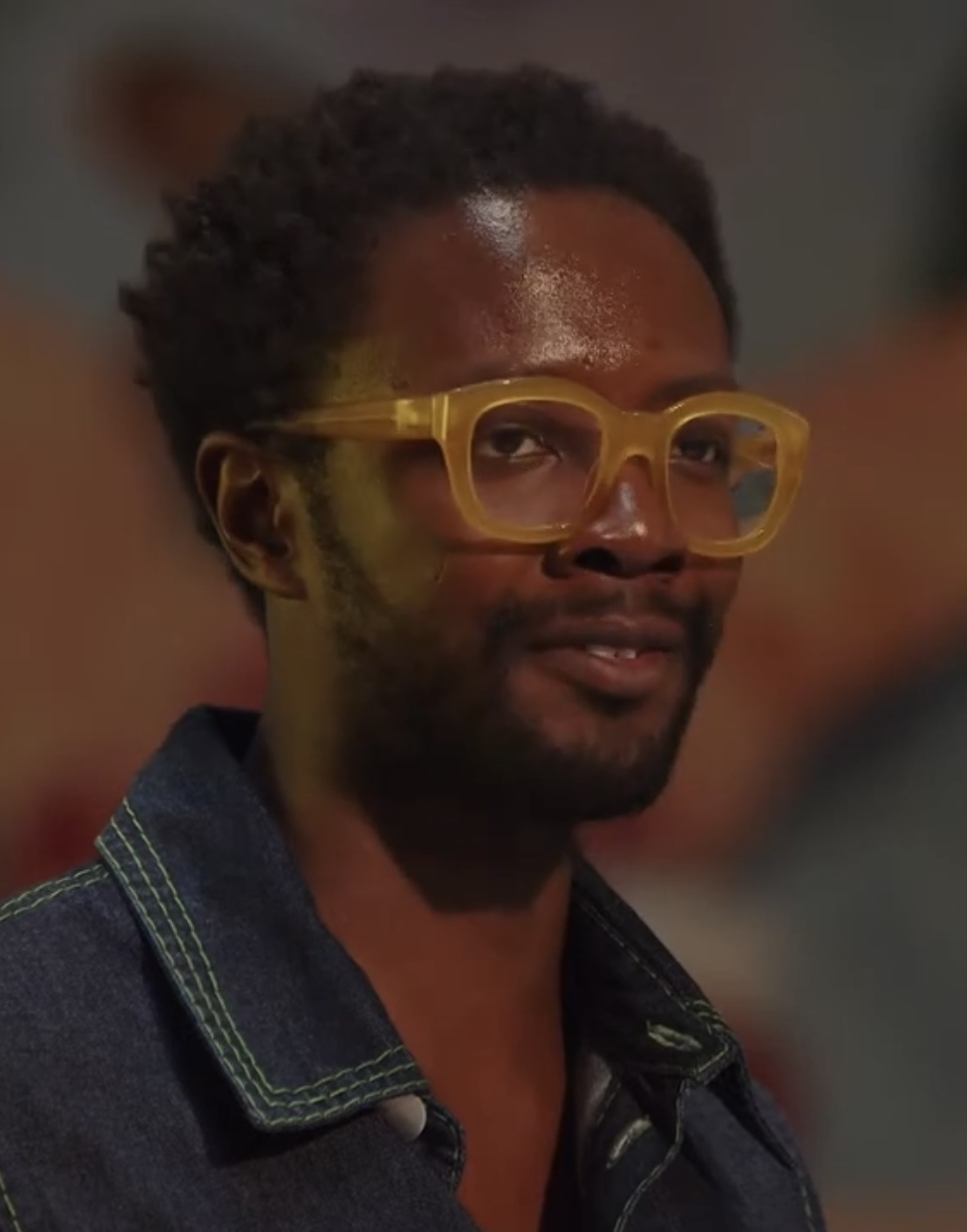
- Douglas at the British Library in 2022
- Born: Omari Shaquille Douglas; 24 March 1994 (age 32); Wolverhampton, England
- Education: ArtsEd
- Occupation: Actor
- Years active: 2015–present

Omari Shaquille Douglas (born 24 March 1994) is an English actor. He began his career in theatre. On television, he is known for his roles in the Channel 4 drama It's a Sin (2021) and the Netflix series Black Doves (2024). He has received nominations for a British Academy Television Award and a Laurence Olivier Award.

== Early life ==
Douglas was born and brought up an only child in Wolverhampton, West Midlands, by his mother while his father lived in the United States. He is of Jamaican heritage. He took classes with the Wolverhampton Youth Music Theatre. After completing school at Thomas Telford School, he moved to London in 2012 to attend drama school and graduated from the Arts Educational Schools in 2015.

== Career ==
Douglas began his career in theatre. His credits include Cole Porter's High Society and, more recently, Emma Rice's adaptation of Wise Children at the Old Vic; Peter Pan and Jesus Christ Superstar at Regent's Park Open Air Theatre; Kneehigh's Tristan & Yseult at Shakespeare's Globe; The Life at the Southwark Playhouse; and Annie Get Your Gun at the Sheffield Crucible.

In October 2019, it was announced Douglas would star in Russell T Davies' miniseries It's a Sin as Roscoe Babatunde. The series premiered in January 2021 on Channel 4 and in February on HBO Max.

Douglas starred in Constellations at the Vaudeville Theatre in 2021, alongside Russell Tovey, in a version of the play revised to accommodate two male actors. In 2022, he received an Olivier Award nomination for Best Actor for his performance. He was cast as Cliff in the West End revival of Cabaret later in 2021.

== Stage and screen credits ==
=== Film ===
Year	Title	Role	Notes
2019	Wise Children	Show Girl Nora	Recording
2022	Swim	Sid	Short film
2023	Rye Lane	Mona	
2023	A Little Life	JB	Recording
2024	And Mrs	Mo	

=== Television ===
Key
†	Denotes television productions that have not yet been released

Year	Title	Role	Notes
2021	It's a Sin	Roscoe Babatunde	Main role; miniseries
2022	I Hate Suzie Too	Holland Fitz-Henry	3 episodes; series two
2023	Nolly	Bruce	1 episode; miniseries
2024	Black Doves	Michael	6 episodes; series one
TBA	War †	TBA	Series two

=== Theatre ===
Year	Title	Role	Notes
2015	High Society	Godfrey / Chester (understudy)	The Old Vic, London
2015	Hairspray	Gilbert / Seaweed (understudy)	UK tour
2016	Jesus Christ Superstar	Ensemble / Caiaphas (understudy)	Regent's Park Open Air Theatre, London
2016	Annie Get Your Gun	Ensemble	Crucible Theatre, Sheffield
2017	The Life	Slick	Southwark Playhouse, London
2017	Tristan & Yseult	Lovespotter / Animator	Globe Theatre, London
2017	Five Guys Named Moe	Eat Moe / No Moe (alternate)	Marble Arch Theatre, London
2018	Peter Pan	Michael Darling	Regent's Park Open Air Theatre, London
2018	RUSH	Boy	King's Head Theatre, London
2018	Wise Children	Show Girl Nora	The Old Vic, London
2020	Romantics Anonymous	Salesman / Fred	Bristol Old Vic, Bristol
2021	Constellations	Manuel	Donmar Warehouse / Vaudeville Theatre, London
2021	Cabaret	Cliff Bradshaw	Playhouse Theatre, London
2023	A Little Life	JB	Harold Pinter Theatre / Savoy Theatre, London
2025	Lavender, Hyacinth, Violet, Yew	Duncan	Bush Theatre, London

== Awards and nominations ==
Year	Award	Category	Work	Result	Ref
2022	Laurence Olivier Award	Best Actor	Constellations	Nominated	
2022	WhatsOnStage Award	Best Performer in a Male Identifying Role in a Play	Constellations	Nominated	
2022	BPG Awards	Breakthrough Award	It's a Sin	Nominated	(Note: Shared.)
2022	British Academy Television Awards	Best Supporting Actor	It's a Sin	Nominated	
