= Carly Craig =

American actress

- Born: June 12, 1980 (age 46); San Diego, California, U.S.
- Occupation: Actress
- Years active: 2001–present
- Spouse: Zachary Reiter (m. 2019)
- Children: 2
- Relatives: Mandy Moore (step-sister)

Carly Craig (born June 12, 1980) is an American actress.

== Background ==
Craig was born in San Diego and grew up there. Her large Italian-Irish family includes two professional baseball players: her father, Rocky Craig, a scout for the Seattle Mariners; and younger brother, Casey Craig. Her mother, Marz Moore (née Olson), is a flight attendant for American Airlines. She has one sister and two brothers. She is the step-sister of Mandy Moore and her brothers (Carly's mother remarried Mandy's father).

== Career ==
Craig studied at The Stella Adler Academy and later graduated from The Second City in Chicago. She met famed manager Bernie Brillstein while waiting tables and decided to put on a comedy show with her classmates. Brillstein came to the show and soon after, signed her as a client. Director David Wain cast Craig in Role Models as a love interest of Seann William Scott. Other projects include Mike Leigh's critically lauded live show Ecstasy, Neil LaBute's Bash, The Farrelly brothers' Hall Pass, The Three Stooges, and Dumb and Dumber To playing young Fraida Felcher. On television, she has had recurring roles on Stephen Merchant's HBO series Hello Ladies, Ben Stiller's Burning Love, and ABC's American Housewife as Katie's rival Tara Summers.

Carly Craig was listed as a "Vanities Girl" for the April 2011 edition of Vanity Fair along with Kristen Bell, Leslie Mann, and Mila Kunis. She was ranked No. 83 on the "Maxim Hot 100 List" in 2011. She appeared in Esquire and acted in Kevin Farley's film Paranormal Movie in 2013. In 2014, she played young Fraida Felcher in Dumb and Dumber To, and also starred as a single air flight attendant in the Adult Swim series Infomercials. In 2018, she co-created and starred in Sideswiped, a comedy TV series on YouTube Premium.

In April 2023 it was announced that Craig will write and executive produce the upcoming animated series Hellicious for TBS.

== Personal life ==
Craig has two children. She is the stepsister of Mandy Moore, who acts and is a singer.

== Filmography ==
Film roles
Year	Title	Role	Notes
2005	The Family Plan	Lila	Short film
2006	Airplane Disasters	Carly	
2006	Goodnight Burbank	Taylor McCall	Short film
2007	Everyone's a Victor	Kristy	Short film
2007	Bagboy	The Girl in the Museum	
2007	The Heartbreak Kid	Jodi's Wedding Guest	
2008	Role Models	Connie	
2010	Death and Cremation	Shelly Fairchild	
2011	Hall Pass	Nicotine Patch Girl	
2011	Starsucker	Ms. Abernathy	
2012	The Three Stooges	Mrs. Harter	
2012	Noobz	Melissa	
2012	The Last Straw	Steph	Short film
2013	Paranormal Movie	Katie MacDonald	
2013	Live at the Foxes Den	Elizabeth Dreisdale	
2013	The Newest Testament	Sue	Short film
2014	Project Greenlight Finalist	Allison	Short film
2014	Dumb and Dumber To	Young Fraida	
2016	Flock of Dudes	Zane	
2020	Faith Based	Brandy	

Television roles
Year	Title	Role	Notes
2005	Halley's Comet	Liza	Television film
2007	Wainy Days	Sorority Girl	Episode: "Zandy"
2008–2010	Childrens Hospital	Blake's TV Wife / Catlike Doctor	Episodes: "This Kid's Getting a Vasectomy" and "I See Her Face Everywhere"
2010	As the Working World Turns	Willa	
2011	Inside Carly	Carly	
2013	Burning Love	Felicia	14 episodes
2013	The Castle	Amy	
2013–2014	Hello Ladies	Carrie	Episodes: "The Wedding" and "Hello Ladies: The Movie"
2014	The Walking Fred	Julie	Episode: "S5 EP6 Recap: Consumed"
2014–2015	Cougar Town	Kelly / Mother at Cake Shop	Episodes: "The Trip to Pirate's Cove" and "The Wrong Thing to Do"
2015	Newsreaders	Marisa Goddard	Episode: "The Creepiest Man Alive; Bomb Sniffing Dogs"
2016	The Crossroads of History	Erma	Episode: "Lincoln"
2016	That's What She Said	Girl	
2016–2021	American Housewife	Tara Summers	Recurring role
2018	Big & $ave	Fina	Television film
2018	Sideswiped	Olivia Maple	Also co-creator and executive producer 8 episodes
TBA	Hellicious		Writer and executive producer for the upcoming animated series TBA
