= Sacramento (film) =

- Theatrical release poster
- Directed by: Michael Angarano
- Written by: Michael Angarano; Chris Smith
- Produced by: Stephen Braun; Eric B. Fleischman; Chris Abernathy; Sam Grey; Michael Angarano; Chris Smith
- Starring: Michael Cera; Michael Angarano; Maya Erskine; Kristen Stewart
- Cinematography: Ben Mullen
- Edited by: Max Goldblatt
- Music by: Peter Erskine
- Production companies: Bee-Hive Production; The Wonder Company
- Distributed by: Vertical
- Release dates: June 8, 2024 (Tribeca Festival); April 11, 2025 (United States)
- Running time: 89 minutes
- Country: United States
- Language: English
- Box office: $706,033

Sacramento is a 2024 American road comedy film directed by Michael Angarano, who wrote the screenplay with Chris Smith. It stars Michael Cera, Angarano, Maya Erskine and Kristen Stewart.

== Synopsis ==
Rickey and Glenn take an impromptu road trip from Los Angeles to Sacramento.

== Cast ==
- Michael Angarano as Rickey
- Michael Cera as Glenn
- Kristen Stewart as Rosie
- Maya Erskine as Tallie
- AJ Mendez as Arielle
- Iman Karram as Jess
- Rosalind Chao as Dr. Lisa Murray
- Bunny Levine as Mrs. Krenshaw

== Production ==
Angarano co-wrote the script with Chris Smith. Both also acted as producers alongside Bee-Hive Production's Stephen Braun, The Wonder Company's Eric B. Fleischman and Chris Abernathy, and Sam Grey.

=== Casting ===
The production was announced in November 2020 with Michael Cera and Maya Erskine amongst the cast with an expected shoot start date of early 2021. In April 2023, Kristen Stewart and former wrestler AJ Mendez were added to the cast.

=== Filming ===
Principal photography took place on location in Sacramento in the spring of 2023. Filming locations included Gunther's Ice Cream Store and 35th Street and Folsom Boulevard, as well as Old Sacramento, Downtown Sacramento, East Sacramento, and the R Street Corridor.

== Release ==
Sacramento had its world premiere at the 2024 Tribeca Festival on June 8, 2024. Prior to the premiere, Vertical acquired distribution rights to the film. The film was released in the United States on April 11, 2025.

== Reception ==
On the review aggregator website Rotten Tomatoes, 85% of 66 critics' reviews are positive, with an average rating of 6.5/10. The website's consensus reads: "An amusingly perceptive comedy about the push and pull of friendship, Sacramento glows with charm even when its characters drive each other mad." Metacritic, which uses a weighted average, assigned the film a score of 69 out of 100, based on 13 critics, indicating "generally favorable" reviews.
