= Chelsea Frei =

American actress

- Born: November 16, 1992 (age 33); Andover, Massachusetts, United States
- Education: New York University (BA)
- Occupation: Actress

Chelsea Frei (born November 16, 1992) is an American actress. She is known for portraying Bridget Moody in the American TV series The Moodys and Mare Pritti in The Paper.

== Early life ==
Frei was born in Andover, Massachusetts, and graduated from Andover High School in 2011. She received a BFA in acting from New York University.

== Career ==
In 2018, Frei starred in the TV comedy series Sideswiped. She went on to star as Victoria Gotti in the Lifetime biopic Victoria Gotti: My Father's Daughter. From 2019 to 2021, Frei starred as Bridget Moody in The Moodys. Other credits include Shrill, The Last O.G., and The Addams Family (2019).

In 2022, Frei played Ingrid in the HBO series The Time Traveler's Wife, and Maya Campbell in The Cleaning Lady.

In September 2024, Frei joined the cast of The Office sequel The Paper.

== Filmography ==
Television
Year	Title	Role	Notes
2018	Sideswiped	Jayne Tyler	Series regular, 8 Episodes
2019	Victoria Gotti: My Father's Daughter	Victoria Gotti	Television film
2020	The Last O.G.	Luna	Recurring role, 4 episodes
2021	Shrill	Lauren	Episode: "Beach"
2019–2021	The Moodys	Bridget Moody	Series regular, 14 episodes
2022	Dollface	Alison J.	Recurring role, season 2
2022	The Time Traveler's Wife	Ingrid	Episode: "Episode Four"
2022	The Cleaning Lady	Maya Campbell	Recurring role, season 2
2023	Poker Face	Dana	Episode: "The Night Shift"
2024	Animal Control	Isabelle	Episodes: "Skunks and Swans", "Beagles and Lemurs", "Hot Dogs and Lobsters"
2025	DMV	Amber	Episode: "Don't Kill the Job"
2025–present	The Paper	Mare Pritti	Main role

Film
Year	Title	Role	Notes
2019	The Addams Family	Bethany (voice)	
2025	The Life List	Megan	
2026	Lucy Schulman	TBA	Post-production
