= Swipe (magazine) =

Free-print Magazine

SWIPE
- Editor-in-chief: Barney Guiton
- Frequency: Fortnightly
- Publisher: Tom Rendell
- Total circulation: 20,000 (2016)
- First issue: May 26, 2016; 10 years ago
- Country: United Kingdom
- Based in: London
- Language: English
- ISSN: 0261-3077
- OCLC: 958315995

SWIPE is a free-print magazine. Launched in May 2016, SWIPE targets millennials (18 - 34 year olds) in London by distributing the magazine at tube stations and in selected offices, co-working spaces and cafes. 20,000 copies are distributed every fortnight and contributors include online brands like Business Insider, CityLab and Wikihow. SWIPE was founded by Tom Rendell and Barney Guiton and includes a young editorial team formerly of The Times, The Independent and Newsweek.
