= Romantic comedy =

Film genre

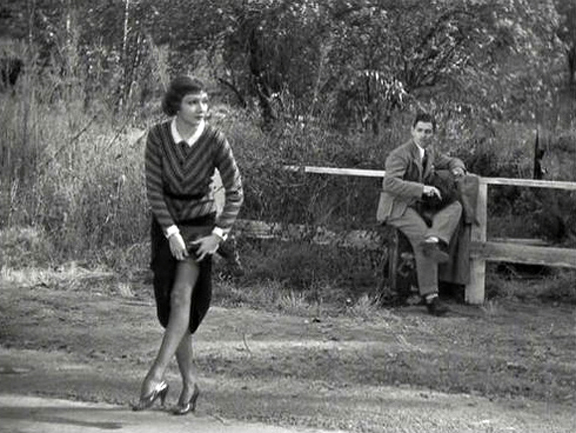
The hitchhiking scene from It Happened One Night

Romantic comedy (commonly shortened to romcom or rom-com) is a sub-genre of comedy and romance fiction, focusing on lighthearted, humorous plot lines centered on romantic ideas, such as how love is able to surmount all obstacles. Romantic comedy evolved from Ancient Greek comedy, medieval romance, and 18th-century Restoration comedy, later developing into sub-genres like screwball comedies, career woman comedies, and 1950s sex comedies in Hollywood.

A common convention in romantic comedies is the "meet-cute", a humorous or unexpected encounter that creates initial tension and sets up the romantic storyline.

== History ==
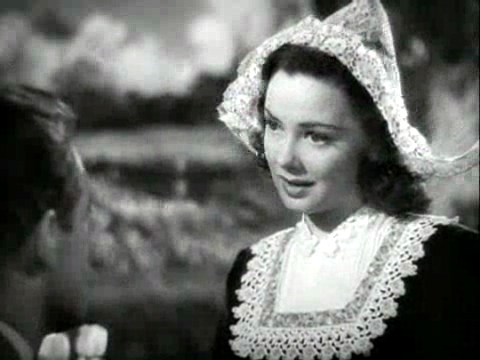
Kathryn Grayson in Seven Sweethearts (1942), a musical romantic comedy film

Comedies, rooted in the fertility rites and satyr plays of ancient Greece, have often incorporated sexual or social elements.

The Oxford Dictionary of Literary Terms defines romantic comedy as "a general term for comedies that deal mainly with the follies and misunderstandings of young lovers, in a light‐hearted and happily concluded manner which usually avoids serious satire". This reference states that the "best‐known examples are Shakespeare's comedies of the late 1590s, A Midsummer Night's Dream, Twelfth Night, and As You Like It being the most purely romantic, while Much Ado About Nothing approaches the comedy of manners and The Merchant of Venice is closer to tragicomedy."

It was not until the development of the literary tradition of romantic love in the Western European medieval period, though, that "romance" came to refer to "romantic love" situations. They were previously referred to as the heroic adventures of medieval chivalric romance. Those adventures traditionally focused on a knight's feats on behalf of a lady, so the modern themes of love were quickly woven into them, as in Chrétien de Troyes's Lancelot, the Knight of the Cart.

The contemporary romantic comedy genre was shaped by 18th-century Restoration comedy and 19th-century romantic melodrama. Restoration comedies were typically comedies of manners that relied on knowledge of the complex social rules of high society, particularly related to navigating the marriage-market, an inherent feature of the plot in many of these plays, such as William Wycherley's The Country Wife. While the melodramas of the Romantic period had little to do with comedy, they were hybrids incorporating elements of domestic and sentimental tragedies, pantomime "with an emphasis on gesture, on the body, and the thrill of the chase," and other genres of expression such as songs and folk tales.

In the 20th century, as Hollywood grew, the romantic comedy in America mirrored other aspects of society in its rapid changes, developing many sub-genres through the decades. This can be seen in the screwball comedy developed in response to the censorship of the Hays Code in the 1920s–1930s, the career woman comedy (such as George Stevens' Woman of the Year, starring Katharine Hepburn and Spencer Tracy) post-WWII, and the sex comedy made popular by Rock Hudson and Doris Day in the 1950s–1960s.

== Evolution ==
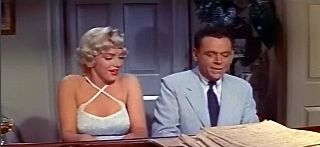
Marilyn Monroe and Tom Ewell in the Seven Year Itch (1955) trailer

As of 2023, in the US, romantic comedies were slightly more popular with women than men. However, overall public sentiment towards them is still generally positive. Meanwhile, the 80s, 90s, and 2000s are the most often perceived as the decades in which the best romantic comedies were made.

In the 2010s, the romantic comedy genre was seen as being in decline. For instance, by author Angie Errigo, who in 2014 described them as "endangered". However, they are also seen as having experienced something of a resurgence in the 2020s. This can attributed to a range of factors, including nostalgia for older romantic comedies and the rise of streaming services such as Netflix.

With regard to streaming services, writer Scott Meslow views them as an important driver in both the resurgence and evolution of romantic comedies. In his eyes, "Everything that makes a romcom look unattractive to a traditional Hollywood studio now makes them more attractive to a service like Netflix,". In addition, he believes that, though the genre has historically centered the perspectives of the "rich, white, thin and straight", streaming has brought about an increased variety of characters and viewpoints in romantic comedies. This is given that "streaming services... tend to take more chances" on stories with underrepresented perspectives.

Romantic comedies have begun to spread out of their conventional and traditional structure into other territory and to explore more complex topics. These films often still follow the typical plot of "a light and humorous movie, play, etc., whose central plot is a happy love story" but with more complexity.

Some romantic comedies have adopted special circumstances for the main characters, as in Warm Bodies where the protagonist is a zombie who falls in love with a human girl after eating her boyfriend. The effect of their love towards each other is that it starts spreading to the other zombies and even starts to cure them. With the zombie cure, the two main characters can now be together since they do not have a barrier between them anymore. Another strange set of circumstances is in Zack and Miri Make a Porno where the two protagonists are building a relationship while trying to make a pornographic film together. Both these films take the typical story arc and then add strange circumstances to add originality.

Other romantic comedies flip the standard conventions of the romantic comedy genre. In films like 500 Days of Summer the two main interests do not end up together, leaving the protagonist somewhat distraught. Other films, like Adam, have the two main interests to end up separated but still content and pursue other goals and love interests.

Some romantic comedies use reversal of gender roles to add comedic effect, popular in screwball comedies. These films contain characters who possess qualities that diverge from the gender role that society has imposed upon them, as seen in Forgetting Sarah Marshall, in which the male protagonist is especially in touch with his emotions. It can also be seen in Made of Honor, in which the female bridesmaids are shown in a negative and somewhat masculine light to advance the likability of the male lead.

Other remakes of romantic comedies involve similar elements, but they explore more adult themes such as marriage, responsibility, disability, or even death. Two films by Judd Apatow, This Is 40 and Knocked Up, deal with these issues. This Is 40 chronicles the mid-life crisis of a couple entering their 40s and Knocked Up addresses unintended pregnancy and the ensuing assuming of responsibility. Silver Linings Playbook by David O. Russell deals with mental illness and the courage to start a new relationship. And Mrs by Daniel Reisinger turns the premise on its head by killing off the lead character's love interest early in the film, and then exploring the topic of love and grief through comedy.

All of these go against the stereotype of what romantic comedy has become as a genre. Yet, the genre of romantic comedy is simply a structure, and all of these elements do not negate the fact that these films are still romantic comedies.

== Contrived romantic encounters: the "meet cute" ==
One of the conventions of romantic comedy films is the entertainment factor in a contrived encounter of two potential romantic partners in unusual or comic circumstances, which film critics such as Roger Ebert or the Associated Press's Christy Lemire have called a "meet-cute" situation. During a "meet-cute", scriptwriters often create a sense of awkwardness between the two potential partners by depicting an initial clash of personalities or beliefs, an embarrassing situation, or by introducing a comical misunderstanding or mistaken identity situation. Sometimes, the term is used without a hyphen (a "meet cute"), or as a verb ("to meet cute").

Roger Ebert describes the concept of a Meet Cute as "when boy meets girl in a cute way". As an example, he cites "The Meet Cute in Lost and Found [which] has Jackson and Segal running their cars into each other in Switzerland. Once recovered, they Meet Cute again when they run into each other while on skis. Eventually, they fall in love."

== See also ==
- Bromantic comedy
- Chick flick
- Screwball comedy
- Sex comedy
- Sitcom
- List of romantic comedy films
- List of romantic comedy television series
