= Rob Greenberg =

American film & TV writer

- Born: United States
- Occupations: Screenwriter, television writer, director, producer

Rob Greenberg is an American writer.

== Credits ==
=== Writing ===
==== Television ====
- Animal Control (written by)
- The Moodys (written by)
- Spellbound (2004/I) (TV) (writer)
- Harry's Girl (2003) (TV) (writer)
- Spellbound (2003) (TV) (writer)
- Bad Haircut (2001) (TV) (writer)
- Frasier

==== Film ====
- Meet Dave (2008) (written by)
- Cloudy with a Chance of Meatballs (2009) (additional screenplay material)
- Overboard (2018) (written by)
- The Valet (2022) (written by)

=== Directing ===
==== Television ====
- Animal Control
- The Moodys
- My Boys
- How I Met Your Mother
- Scrubs
- Happy Endings
- Worst Week
- Mike Birbiglia's Secret Public Journal (2008 special)

==== Film ====
- Overboard (2018)

== Awards and nominations ==
Nominated for 4 Emmy Awards and 2 Writers Guild of America Awards.
