= Chris Phillips (voice actor) =

American voice actor

- Occupation: Voice actor
- Years active: 1981–present

Chris Phillips is an American voice actor. He has had roles in Rockstar games, such as Marty Chonks and El Burro in Grand Theft Auto III and voiced Alex Balder, Mercenary and Killer Suit in Max Payne (both 2001). He has also had roles in Atari games, including Nolaloth, Thunderbelly, Lorne Starling, Koraboros and Prison Leader in Neverwinter Nights 2 (2006) and Crowley in Alone in the Dark (2008).

== Career ==
Phillips was the voice of Face, the former mascot of Nickelodeon's Nick Jr. block. Phillips voiced Face from 1994 to 2003, and returned to voice him for an appearance on the New Year's countdown with Stick Stickly on TeenNick's The '90s Are All That block in 2011. In Easter (March 27), 2016, Phillips returned to voice Face on NickSplat's YouTube video "Are You An Easter Bunny?". Phillips was one of Cartoon Network's continuity announcers from 1992 to 1997 and returned to the network in 2007 as the announcer for its "Invaded" event.

Phillips voiced many characters on the animated series Doug, (Disney) and became the voice of Roger Klotz and Boomer Bledsoe when Billy West left. Other animated series Phillips has worked on include PB&J Otter for Disney, Beavis and Butt-Head for MTV, Generation Jets for CBS, and Bubble Guppies and Team Umizoomi for Nickelodeon. Phillips did voice work for the PBS show Between the Lions and has been in numerous "TV Funhouse" episodes for Saturday Night Live.

Animated film credits include Felix the Cat: The Movie as the Professor, and Grumper, Roger Klotz, various voices in Doug's 1st Movie, and various voices in Osmosis Jones, directed by Bobby and Peter Farrelly.

Phillips has provided voice work for a number of video games, including Grand Theft Auto III, Max Payne 1 & Max Payne 2: The Fall of Max Payne, Mafia: The City of Lost Heaven, Red Dead Revolver, Alone in the Dark and Neverwinter Nights 2.

His voice has appeared on TV and radio commercials for Cartoon Network, Nickelodeon, Comedy Central, Comcast, Honey Nut Cheerios, eBay, Rolaids, Arby's, Cocoa Puffs, Miller Lite, Lucky Charms, New York Lottery, Cingular, FedEx and Pepto-Bismol.

He appeared in the Denis Leary specials No Cure for Cancer, Lock 'n Load, and Douchebags and Donuts, and directed and appeared in the off-Broadway version of No Cure for Cancer. He was in Leary's holiday special Merry F %$in' Christmas for Comedy Central, wrote and produced the title song and was co-author of the book of the same name. Phillips writes all of Leary's songs with him and produces his CDs. He has received a platinum album for the single "Asshole" and a gold record for No Cure for Cancer.

Phillips has written and produced music for American Motors cars and Ethan Allen Furniture commercials. He co-wrote and performed the theme for Shorties Watching Shorties for Comedy Central and is in the house band for The Comedy Central specials Comics Come Home. Phillips and his band The Enablers are the back-up band for Denis Leary; they released their own CD entitled Everest. Phillips is the secondary continuity announcer for the Nick Jr. Channel.

== Filmography ==
=== Film ===
Year	Title	Role
1982	Beach House	Nudge
1988	Felix the Cat: The Movie	The Professor; Grumper
1990	Street Hunter	Radio Commentator
1994	The Ref	Old Baybrook Policeman
1995	To Die For	High School Soccer Player (uncredited)
1999	Doug's 1st Movie	Roger Klotz; Boomer; Larry; Mr. Chiminy
2001	Osmosis Jones	Doug The Firefighter, Additional Character Voice
2002	The Lovers	Additional voices
2003	A Very Wompkee Christmas	Scout
2011	Top Cat: The Movie	Vinny; Spectrum
2012	Ice Age: Continental Drift	Additional voices
2013	Epic	Additional voices

=== Television ===
Year	Title	Role	Notes
1988	Care Bears	Mr. Space Clown, President of Gamma #1, Melvin (voices)	3 episodes; Uncredited
1990	1/2 Hour Comedy Hour	Animated Character - Opening Sequence	
1991–95	Where in the World Is Carmen Sandiego?	Character Voices	5 episodes
1992–97	Cartoon Network	Channel Announcer	
1993	Denis Leary: No Cure for Cancer	Himself	
1993–2013	Nickelodeon	Channel Announcer	
1994–present	Nick Jr.	Face (1994–2003); Promo Announcer (2004–present)	
1996–99	Doug (Disney)	Roger M. Klotz, Boomer Bledsoe (Disney version, replacing Billy West), Larry the A.V. Nerd (Disney version, replacing Steve Higgins) (voices)	Main role 65 episodes
1997	Denis Leary: Lock 'n Load	Himself	
1998–2000	PB&J Otter	Ernest Otter, Munchy Beaver, Cap'n Crane, Walter Raccoon (voices)	Main role 65 episodes
1999	KaBlam!	Additional voices	Episode: "Going the Extra Mile" (segment: "Little Freaks")
2000–10	Between the Lions	Cliff Hanger, additional voices	16 episodes
2001–05	Saturday Night Live	Various	Saturday TV Funhouse shorts
2002	Contest Searchlight	Himself	
2003–04	Generation Jets	Willie, Spike, Blitz	13 episodes
2004	The Wrong Coast	Various Celebrity Voices	2 episodes; TV mini-series
2004	Davey and Goliath's Snowboard Christmas	Additional voices	TV movie
2004	Mighty Bug 5	Mr. Bigsnail	Interstitial series
2005	Merry F#%$in' Christmas	Additional voices	
2005	The Buzz On Maggie	French waiter	Episode: "Le Termite"
2005–09	Nicktoons Network	Channel Announcer	
2007	Cartoon Network Invaded	Announcer	For May 2007 only.
2009	Rescue Me	Rep. Gerard	1 episode
2011	Beavis and Butt-Head	Various	various episodes
2011	The 90's Are All That	Face	"Stick Clark's New Year's Sticking Eve"
2011–23	Bubble Guppies	Mr. Grouper (singing voice), Clam, Mr. Grumpfish, Various snails, lobsters and crabs (voices)	128 episodes
2011–14	Team Umizoomi	Doormouse, Silly Bear, Zilch, Squiddy, Additional Voice Talent	21 episodes
2014–17	Wallykazam!	Cake Monster, Jingle Troll, Goblin Guard (voices)	4 episodes
2016	NickSplat	Face	Promo
2018–21	Pinkalicious & Peterrific	Mr. Crunk, Zookeeper, Penguin, Spritely, Lucky Ducky, Pink Ducks, Ringmaster Gnome (voices)	14 episodes
2018–20	Butterbean's Cafe	Spork and Spatch (voices)	18 episodes
2018	44 Cats	Gas, Little Baddy (voices)	5 episodes
2019	Welcome to the Wayne	Meshughnah (voice)	Episode: "Welcome to the Wassermans"
2025	Super Duper Bunny League	Boss, Litterbug (voices)	6 episodes

=== Video games ===
Year	Title	Role
1996	Nick Jr. Play Math!	Face
2001	Max Payne	Alex Balder, Mercenary, Killer Suit
2001	Grand Theft Auto III	El Burro, Marty Chonks
2002	Mafia: The City of Lost Heaven	Additional Voice Over Talent
2003	Max Payne 2: The Fall of Max Payne	Cleaner
2004	Red Dead Revolver	Carnaby Peabody, Hanz Kenyan, Gabby Brennan
2006	Neverwinter Nights 2	Nolaloth, Thunderbelly, Lorne Starling, Koraboros, Prison Leader
2008	Alone in the Dark	Crowley
2008	Order Up!	Jimbo Jambo, Tex Porterhouse
2008	Goosebumps Horrorland	Carnival Barker

=== Other ===
Year	Title	Role	Notes
2012	Captain Cornelius Cartoon's Cartoon Lagoon	Captain Cornelius Cartoon	
2014	Tennessee Tuxedo and Chumley	Tennessee Tuxedo, Chumley, Baldy, Phineas J. Whoopee	Video short
2017	Nickelodeon Animated Shorts Program	Rabbit	Episode: "Mini Cops"
2017	Captain D's commercials	Dave the "D-Gull"	Television
