= The Real Blonde =

1997 film by Tom DiCillo

- Theatrical release poster
- Directed by: Tom DiCillo
- Written by: Tom DiCillo
- Produced by: Tom Rosenberg; Marcus Viscidi
- Starring: Matthew Modine; Catherine Keener; Daryl Hannah; Maxwell Caulfield; Elizabeth Berkley; Marlo Thomas; Bridgette Wilson; Buck Henry; Christopher Lloyd; Kathleen Turner
- Cinematography: Frank Prinzi
- Edited by: Keiko Deguchi; Camilla Toniolo
- Music by: Jim Farmer
- Production company: Lakeshore Entertainment
- Distributed by: Paramount Pictures
- Release dates: September 14, 1997 (France); February 27, 1998 (U.S. theatrical)
- Running time: 105 minutes
- Language: English
- Budget: $10 million
- Box office: $83,048

The Real Blonde is a 1997 American film directed and written by Tom DiCillo, and starring Matthew Modine, Catherine Keener and Maxwell Caulfield. It is a satire of New York's fashion and entertainment industries, exploring themes of authenticity and ambition.

It was DiCillo's first major high-budget film, costing $10 million to make and being distributed by Paramount Pictures. However, the film only received a limited release and recouped just 0.83% of its budget at the box office.

== Plot ==
Joe is an aspiring actor working as a busboy in a high-class restaurant. His longtime girlfriend, Mary, works as a cosmetician for the fashion industry and largely supports him with her steady income. Joe is more concerned with expressing himself than getting a paying job, and has been unwilling to accept roles that do not live up to his artistic standards. Mary supports Joe, but urges him to accept any role to get his foot in the door. Meanwhile, his co-worker Bob lands a lucrative role on a soap opera. Bob is a classically trained actor, but is willing to overlook the quality of the material for the money. He also has a fetish for natural blonde women, leading him to date Sahara, a naive model, and then dump her after discovering that her hair is dyed.

Joe swallows his artistic pride and meets with an agent, Dee Dee Taylor, who arranges for him to be an extra in a Madonna video. Mary is harassed as she walks to work each day and begins taking a self-defense and anger management class on the advice of her therapist. The instructor encourages her to express her anger, and she finds the class extremely empowering. Bob is successful in his soap opera role and begins a relationship with his beautiful co-star, Kelly, a "real blonde".

In the Madonna video, the director treats Joe and the other extras like cattle. Joe meets Madonna's body double, Tina, a friendly aspiring actress, and gets himself fired for protesting an anti-Semitic statement made by the assistant director. Joe's firing sparks an argument between Joe and Mary. The pressure of Joe's career is straining their relationship, and they have not had sex in a long time. Mary's instructor, Doug, gives her a ride home from her class and makes a pass at her. She rebuffs him, but lies to cover up the incident from Joe. Meanwhile, Bob suffers from erectile dysfunction and is unable to have sex with Kelly. She mocks his inadequacy and leaves him.

Dee Dee takes pity on Joe and allows him to audition for the role of a "sexy serial killer". He reads his lines with Tina and begins to improvise his dialogue. He impresses the producers and lands the role. Tina invites him out for a drink, and he resists her advances with some difficulty. Mary meets with her therapist and tells him about her experience with her self-defense instructor. He tells her that she must become comfortable with men showing their attraction to her and begins sharing his own sexual fantasies about her. She storms out of the session. Meanwhile, Bob is negotiating a long-term contract on the soap opera, but Kelly continues to taunt him on set. Bob threatens to quit the show and then forces the producer to kill off Kelly's character.

Bob goes back to dating Sahara, with whom he is miserable. Joe breaks the big news about his role to Mary, and they rejoice. Mary asks him if she is wrong for feeling angry when men hit on her. Joe supports her and threatens to beat up her therapist if he ever sees him again. They have sex for the first time in months and drift off to sleep, happy and satisfied. Mary wraps her hand around Joe's finger, revealing that his improvised monologue had been about his feelings for her.

== Cast ==
- Matthew Modine as Joe, an aspiring actor with strong opinions.
- Catherine Keener as Mary, Joe's longtime girlfriend and a successful makeup artist.
- Maxwell Caulfield as Bob, an actor with a fetish for natural blondes.
- Daryl Hannah as Kelly, a blonde soap-opera star.
- Bridgette Wilson as Sahara, a naive model with dyed blonde hair.
- Marlo Thomas as Blair, a fashion photographer and Mary's boss.
- Kathleen Turner as Dee Dee Taylor, a prominent talent agent.
- Elizabeth Berkley as Tina, an aspiring actress who works as Madonna's double.
- Denis Leary as Doug, Mary's self-defense instructor.
- Steve Buscemi as Nick Reve, the director for Madonna's video.
- Dave Chappelle as Zee, the assistant director for Madonna's video.
- Christopher Lloyd as Ernst, a head waiter and Joe's boss.
- Buck Henry as Dr. Leuter
- Beatrice Winde as Wilma

== Background and themes ==
The Real Blonde was produced by Lakeshore Entertainment in conjunction with Paramount Pictures. The ownership rights for the film were jointly split between Lakeshore and Paramount, as Paramount helped finance the film. Lakeshore had earlier collaborated with Paramount on the romantic comedy film 'Til There Was You, released in the summer of 1997. Lakeshore also produced director Tom DiCillo's previous film Box of Moonlight, which was distributed by independent studio Trimark. The Real Blonde had a higher budget than DiCillo's previous work, with it being the only film of his that was ever funded by a major studio. He claimed it was not the kind of movie the studio executives wanted him to make, saying at the time, "when they gave me the budget, they trusted me not to make a three-hour movie about two people staring at each other." In an interview with IndieWire, DiCillo discussed the film's title, remarking, "It's a title that forces you to think twice. And I think the film asks you to think twice. If you take a look at the title, on a surface level, it almost appears to be a serious thing. But if you think about what it's really saying, with the 'e' on the end 'Blonde' (feminizing it), it's pertaining to a woman. Pertaining particularly to a very specific area of a woman. If a woman is the real blonde, her hair on top and on the bottom is going to be blonde. The title itself just forces you to go there which I think is great." He added, "every element of authority or what is perceived as real in the film deserves a second look. My idea was that the real blonde represents this ideal, this image of perfection that we all sort of create. We place it just outside of our grasp and exert this tremendous energy to try to attain it. Most of the time the energy is absolutely misplaced. It causes us to literally exhaust ourselves. It sometimes can be really destructive and ultimately is a fruitless exercise."

The film's lead couple were named Joe and Mary as a reference to the biblical figures Joseph and Mary. The film is set in New York City and has several meta-references to the music, film, and TV industries. In one scene, Joe has a meeting with talent agent Dee Dee (played by Kathleen Turner), and in her office there are posters for the films Internal Affairs and Primal Fear, which were both released by Paramount. DiCillo claims he fought with the film's producers over a scene which he described as one of the "most beautifully surreal" scenes he'd ever put onto film. According to him, this particular scene was cut because the producers thought it would hurt the film's chances of breaking through to Middle America. When asked what it was like dealing with Paramount, DiCillo said in 1998 that Paramount was "amazingly open" about the film and fully understood what they were getting themselves into since they had taken the time to look into the film's content and knew what type of film it was. DiCillo also said that their president, Sherry Lansing, suggested keeping a scene that he had originally cut, where Joe almost starts a fight on the street with a person who is hitting a woman.

=== Casting ===
The film had a large cast of several well-known actors, in addition to including other actors who had previously collaborated with DiCillo, such as Catherine Keener and Steve Buscemi. In a 1997 interview, DiCillo noted that having so many stars in the cast was a bigger adjustment for him to get used to than having a higher budget, saying "every four days I was lifting my head up and suddenly seeing another movie star walk onto my set. I'm going 'what are all these people doing on my set'?". At one point, Isabella Rossellini and Faye Dunaway had been announced for the project in unknown roles, although they both pulled out. DiCillo later recalled in 2017 that Tom Rosenberg of Lakeshore Entertainment wanted him to cast a big-name actress in the role of Mary, such as Nicole Kidman or Julianne Moore. DiCillo instead wanted Catherine Keener to play Mary, as he had extensive experience working with her on previous films, including Box of Moonlight, Living in Oblivion and Johnny Suede. He said, "I knew no one could play the part like Catherine, but Lakeshore wouldn't approve her. I was in agony. Every night, I'd lie awake asking myself, 'Is this what it takes to move ahead? Rejecting all the wonderfully talented people I've worked with who actually helped get me to where I am?'". DiCillo kept pushing for Keener to play Mary, and eventually Rosenberg relented, saying he could cast Keener as long as she worked out with a personal trainer for six weeks and consulted a professional make-up artist. DiCillo was hesitant to call Keener and tell her this, saying, "I imagined her hearing the words I was about to say to her, and I knew there was no way I could make the call. What actress could ever commit to a film knowing the producers were questioning the way she looked? Also, it would have destroyed our friendship". DiCillo decided not to call Keener. He says, "[instead] I called Tom Rosenberg and said, 'That's it. I've put stars in every other role. I'm casting Catherine Keener, without your trainer and your make-up'".

Comedian and actor Denis Leary has a role in the film as a self-defense teacher for women, although at this point, he hadn't ever appeared in a box office hit. In a 1998 interview, DiCillo said he wasn't nervous about casting Leary, since he was a friend of his, with DiCillo having earlier directed the music video for Leary's song "Asshole" (from his 1993 comedy album No Cure for Cancer). DiCillo added, "Dennis has this kind of persona, coming off as an angry, screaming man but when you meet him he's really the sweetest guy. I cast him for that. I wanted to put him in this part as this self-defense teacher who really seems to have ulterior motives."

Actress Elizabeth Berkley plays a stunt double for musician Madonna in the film, and Berkley had recently appeared in the controversial NC-17 film Showgirls, where she had fake blonde hair. For The Real Blonde she was filmed with both her natural brown hair and fake blonde hair (while stunt doubling for Madonna). Berkley said that she was a fan of Madonna's, and wasn't trying to do an impression of her. Towards the end of the film, she has a scene at a nightclub where she kisses Matthew Modine's character Joe. When asked about the scene, Berkley said at the time, "he's a sexy guy and he's really sweet and we had a lot of fun. One of the things I love about that scene we had in the nightclub is that there's a real loneliness in his character Joe and my character Tina. It really draws them to each other. There's a certain sadness to that scene which I actually really like because they really need each other in that moment."

== Music ==
The Real Blonde - Music From The Motion Picture

Soundtrack album by Various artists
- Genres: Film score, alternative rock, dance, hip hop
- Length: 48:34
- Label: Milan

Professional ratings
Review scores
Source	Rating
AllMusic	3/5 stars

To coincide with the film's release, an accompanying soundtrack album was released by Milan Records. It consists of pieces of music from Jim Farmer's background score, in addition to including licensed songs from several genres, including hip hop, alternative rock, and dance.

Track listing

1. "Neighbourhood" - 3:27 (Space)
2. "No Respect" - 5:25 (Kool Moe Dee)
3. "Who's Gone" - 3:44 (Yello)
4. "Vanishing Point" - 7:26 (Apollo Four Forty)
5. "The Real Blonde" - 3:52 (Jim Farmer)
6. "Inhaler" - 5:10 (Hooverphonic)
7. "A Martini For Mancini" - 3:35 (Joey Altruda & His Cocktails Crew)
8. "Vaquero" - 1:58 (The Fireballs)
9. "Stolen Dog Jam" - 3:03 (Jim Farmer)
10. "Reeferendrum" - 7:40 (Fluke)
11. "Anthem" - 3:15 (Jeff & Joan Beal)

== Release ==
The Real Blonde premiered on September 14, 1997, at the Deauville Film Festival in France, and went on to play at several other festivals, including the Sundance Film Festival in Utah and the Melbourne International Film Festival in Australia. Paramount Pictures gave it a theatrical run in the United States beginning on February 27, 1998, where it grossed only $83,048 against a budget of $10 million. The film played to just 45 theaters, and after a week, DiCillo received a call from Paramount telling him that the film was going to be pulled from theaters. The film's release predated the creation of Paramount's Paramount Classics division, which started ln May 1998 as a way for the studio to distribute indie-style films like The Real Blonde.

Before the film's poor theatrical run, Lakeshore had already agreed to buy DiCillo's script for a new film titled Double Whammy. However, following The Real Blonde's financial failure, Lakeshore cut the budget in half for this project, and he ended up doing it with different independent studios.

=== Home media ===
It was released on VHS and LaserDisc in North America during late 1998 by Paramount Home Entertainment, and then on DVD in January 1999. The film received a separate LaserDisc release in Japan, which was handled by Pioneer rather than Paramount Home Entertainment. This Japanese LaserDisc was released in April 2000, just a year before films stopped being released on the format.

A high-resolution print of the film was created for digital platforms, and Paramount later added it to their free streaming service Pluto TV. It has currently still never been released on Blu-ray by Paramount Home Entertainment.

== Reception ==
On the review aggregator website Rotten Tomatoes, 34% of 29 critics' reviews are positive.

In September 1997, Lisa Nesselson of Variety wrote, "The Real Blonde pillories the shallow realms of fashion advertising, rock videos and soap operas while championing the search for sincere romance and rewarding work in the big city", and described the film as a "comic exploration of the quest for integrity and depth in a world wowed by artifice and superficiality." She went on to write "[the] populous cast displays appropriate urban energy. Modine is OK, if not especially memorable, as the low-profile actor with sky-high standards. Keener grounds the proceedings with her Everywoman brunette demeanor, and Berkley and Wilson sally forth for the hard-working blond contingent." A 1997 review from Film - Magazine of the British Federation of Film Societies states, "it is a film which wears its heart on its sleeve and to many this is so apparent as to be annoying. However, its dealings with contemporary sexual mores and male/female relationships are, in some parts, quite amusing."

A negative review came from David Denby of New York Magazine in March 1998, who called the film a "sexual roundelay", adding that "The Real Blonde undresses quite a few people, but the picture is so dully written and uncertainly directed that the audience is left wondering whether the stentorian clichés coming out of the characters' mouths are meant satirically or simply represent DiCillo's idea of how people talk." In March 1998, Owen Gleiberman of Entertainment Weekly gave it a C+, commenting "the movie, an attack on superficiality, never quite makes it out of the shallow end." Marc Savlov of The Austin Chronicle labelled it a "very crowded movie that babbles endlessly without ever saying very much." Geoffrey Macnab of British paper The Independent wrote, "director Tom DiCillo finally got a decent budget for his satire The Real Blonde, but there's still no danger of this director joining the movie mainstream."

It was featured on an episode of Siskel & Ebert, where it received two thumbs up from Gene Siskel and Roger Ebert. In his other review for the Chicago Sun-Times, Ebert gave the film 3 out of 4 stars, and wrote:

[Director/writer DiCillo] devises brief, sharply observed scenes. He notices, for example, the way a makeup artist makes up not only a model's face but also her attitude. The way the karate instructor, playing an aggressor, takes a sly pleasure in using sexist insults. The way people talk knowledgeably about movies they haven't seen. The way a guy who's embarrassed to be in a porno store will brazen it out. All of the actors are right for their roles because a degree of typecasting has been done, but Daryl Hannah brings a particularly focused energy to the role of a soap opera actress who is not impressed that a guy is impressed by her. And Catherine Keener brings a wry wit to her character; she sees models on Times Square billboards and knows what it took to get them there. The characters are articulate enough to talk about what really moves them; they don't play sitcom games. DiCillo never puts two and two together, but somehow it all adds up.
