= Monument Ave. (film) =

- VHS cover
- Directed by: Ted Demme
- Written by: Mike Armstrong; Denis Leary (uncredited)
- Produced by: Ted Demme; Jim Serpico; Elie Samaha; Joel Stillerman
- Starring: Jason Barry; Billy Crudup; John Diehl; Greg Dulli; Noah Emmerich; Ian Hart; Famke Janssen; Denis Leary; Colm Meaney; Martin Sheen; Jeanne Tripplehorn
- Cinematography: Adam Kimmel
- Edited by: Jeffery Wolf
- Music by: Todd Kasow
- Production companies: Apostle; Clinica Estetico; Filmline International; Phoenician Films; Spanky Pictures; The Kushner-Locke Company; Tribeca Productions
- Distributed by: Lions Gate Films (theatrical)
- Release dates: January 20, 1998 (Sundance Film Festival); September 25, 1998 (limited)
- Running time: 93 minutes
- Country: United States
- Language: English
- Budget: $4 million
- Box office: $333,760

Monument Ave. (also titled Snitch in the United States and Noose in Australia) is a 1998 American neo-noir crime film directed by Ted Demme and written by Mike Armstrong. The film stars Denis Leary, Famke Janssen, Martin Sheen, Colm Meaney, Ian Hart, and Leary's future Rescue Me co-star Lenny Clarke. Cam Neely also makes a brief appearance.

The film takes place in Charlestown, Massachusetts and centers on small-time criminal Bobby O'Grady (Leary), who becomes conflicted due to Charlestown's code of silence. His loyalty and drive for self-preservation are tested after two of his close family members (also criminals) are gunned down by their boss.

== Plot summary ==
Bobby mentors his young cousin, Seamus, into a life of drugs and crime soon after Seamus emigrates from Dublin, Ireland. Bright, conscientious, but notably naive, Seamus finds himself unable to get used to the spontaneous dangers and recklessness of his new life in the United States.

Seamus commits a hate crime on an African American youth who had crossed the racial boundary around Charlestown in the 1990s. Following this and another particularly traumatic incident, Seamus is afraid of further involving himself with Bobby and Bobby's circle of criminal friends. Seamus tells Bobby he wants to return to Dublin.

The two argue after Seamus blames Bobby for dragging him into a dangerous and "damaging" lifestyle which he never wanted. Seamus is killed soon afterward by crime boss Jackie O'Hara. O'Hara mistakenly believes that Seamus told the police about O'Hara's criminal operations. O'Hara had ordered an earlier hit against Bobby and Seamus' cousin Teddy, because Teddy had made a deal with the police. The deal concerned a reduced prison sentence.

== Cast ==
- Denis Leary as Bobby O'Grady
- Colm Meaney as Jackie O'Hara
- Famke Janssen as Katy O'Connor
- Martin Sheen as Hanlon
- Lenny Clarke as "Skunk"
- Billy Crudup as Teddy
- Ian Hart as "Mouse"
- Lyndon Byers as "Fitzie"
- Melissa Fitzgerald as Sheila
- Jason Barry as Seamus
- John Diehl as "Digger"
- Greg Dulli as Shang
- Jeanne Tripplehorn as Annie

== Production ==
In March 1997, it was reported that Ted Demme and Joel Stillerman's Spanky Pictures had partnered with Denis Leary and Jim Serpico's Apostle to produce the independent film Noose which Leary had written with Mike Armstrong. Leary was set to lead the film whose cast included Kelly Lynch, Ian Hart, Colm Meaney, Billy Crudup and Billy Zane. Demme stated it took the production 4 years to secure the $4 million budget from producers who would allow them total creative control. The film marked the third collaboration between Leary and Demme who became friends working at MTV following No Cure for Cancer and The Ref. After Lynch dropped out due to scheduling conflicts, Demme cast Famke Janssen on the suggestion of Robert Altman who had just directed her in The Gingerbread Man.

== Reception ==
On the review aggregator website Rotten Tomatoes, 90% of 21 critics' reviews are positive. Metacritic, which uses a weighted average, assigned the film a score of 71 out of 100, based on 15 critics, indicating "generally favorable" reviews.
