= Generation Jets =

- Genre: Sports fiction
- Directed by: Christi Bertelsen; Christina Ghiloni
- Voices of: Christopher Knowings; Tara Lipinski; Chris Phillips; Kate Simses
- Country of origin: United States
- Original language: English
- No. of seasons: 1
- No. of episodes: 13

Production
- Production locations: New York City, New York
- Running time: 30 minutes
- Production company: B-Train Films

Original release
- Network: WCBS-TV
- Release: 4 October 2003 – 31 January 2004

Generation Jets was a children's animated television show, created for the New York Jets. It aired Saturdays at 1 p.m. on WCBS-TV in New York City, and has won two day-time Emmy awards.

== Plot ==
Generation Jets follows five school-aged kids as they explore New York City's landmarks. They learn from their adventures and interaction with players and coaches from the New York Jets.

== Production ==
Generation Jets is produced by New York based production company B-Train Films.
