= Ted Demme =

American director, producer, and actor (1963–2002)

- Born: Edward Kern Demme; October 26, 1963; New York City, U.S.
- Died: January 13, 2002 (aged 38); Santa Monica, California, U.S.
- Occupations: Film director, film producer, actor
- Years active: 1988–2002
- Spouse: Amanda Scheer (m. 1994)
- Children: 2
- Relatives: Jonathan Demme (uncle)

Edward Kern Demme (/ˈdɛmi/ DEM-ee; October 26, 1963 – January 13, 2002) was an American director, producer, and actor.

== Early life ==
Demme was born in New York City, the son of Gail (née Kern) and Frederick Rogers Demme. He grew up in Rockville Centre, New York on Long Island and attended South Side Senior High School. He graduated from SUNY-Cortland in 1985. He was the nephew of film producer and director Jonathan Demme.

== Career ==
Demme's media career may have begun with a radio show at WSUC-FM (SUNY-Cortland), a mix of comedy and talk radio with the usual sidekick, as well as some music and was widely listened to on and off campus. He began his career as a production assistant at MTV. He later became a producer in the On-Air Promotions Department, created the cable network's hip-hop show Yo! MTV Raps (with Peter Dougherty), and directed other projects for MTV, including the black-and-white rants starring then-unknown comedian Denis Leary.

Over the course of his career, he established a group of actors that he chose to work with on more than one occasion. The most frequently used of these was Leary, whom he directed as a lead or star in Leary's stand-up specials No Cure for Cancer and Lock n' Load, as well as the films Who's the Man?, The Ref, and Monument Ave. Leary produced the 2001 crime drama film Blow, which starred Johnny Depp as George Jung and was directed by Demme.

== Personal life ==
Demme was married to Amanda Scheer, with whom he had two children. Scheer later opened several popular Los Angeles bars, including Teddy's at the Roosevelt Hotel, named in honor of her late husband. He was a fan of the Green Bay Packers.

== Death ==
On January 13, 2002, while playing a celebrity basketball game, Demme collapsed and died of a heart attack which may have been related to cocaine later found in his system during an autopsy. Demme was cremated and his ashes were given to his family.

== Tributes ==
Much of one edition of the IFC program Dinner for Five was given over to a description of Demme's last night and fond reminiscences about his life, mostly by Denis Leary and the show's host Jon Favreau. This touched on Demme's being a fan of the Green Bay Packers and his fondness for playing practical jokes.

At the 2002 Golden Globe awards show, one week following Demme's death, Kevin Spacey wore a picture of Demme on his suit jacket. He was also in the 74th Academy Awards In Memoriam tribute that was also presented by Kevin Spacey.

The Truth About Charlie, his uncle Jonathan Demme's remake of Charade, was dedicated in his memory.

The 2003 album Blackberry Belle by The Twilight Singers led by Greg Dulli, was written in tribute to Demme, Dulli's close friend. Dulli had been working on another project, titled Amber Headlights (which would later see the light of day in 2005), but abandoned those sessions due to Demme's death. The recordings which followed, fueled in part by the memory of Demme, resulted in Blackberry Belle.

The 2002 film Punch-Drunk Love, written and directed by Paul Thomas Anderson, is dedicated to Demme.

== Filmography ==
=== Actor ===
- Gun (1 episode, 1997)
- Blow (2001)
- John Q. (2002) Himself (Cameo) (Posthumously released)

=== Director ===
- Yo! MTV Raps (1988, Unknown episodes)
- APAB: Oh My God... It's the News! (1991)
- The Bet (1992)
- No Cure for Cancer (1992)
- Who's the Man? (1993)
- The Ref (1994)
- Beautiful Girls (1996)
- Homicide: Life on the Street (2 episodes, 1994–1996)
- Gun (1 episode, 1997)
- Subway Stories: Tales from the Underground (Segment: "Manhattan Miracle," 1997)
- Denis Leary: Lock 'n Load (1997)
- Monument Ave. (1998)
- Life (1999)
- Action (1 episode, 1999)
- Blow (2001)
- A Decade Under the Influence (Posthumously released, 2003)

=== Producer ===
- Yo! MTV Raps (1988, Unknown episodes)
- Hangin' w/MTV (1992, Executive producer)
- Monument Ave. (1998)
- Rounders (1998)
- Tumbleweeds (1999, Executive producer)
- A Lesson Before Dying (1999, Executive producer)
- Action (1 episode, Executive producer, 1999)
- Blow (2001)
- A Decade Under the Influence (Posthumously released, 2003)

== Awards and nominations ==
Year	Award	Result	Category	Film
1996	San Sebastián International Film Festival	Nominated	Golden Shell	Beautiful Girls
1999	Emmy Award	Won	Outstanding Made for Television Movie	A Lesson Before Dying (Shared with Robert Benedetti, Ellen Krass, and Joel Stillerman)
2001	Emmy Award	Nominated	Outstanding Nonfiction Special	A Decade Under the Influence (Shared with Alison Palmer Bourke, Caroline Kaplan, Jerry Kupfer, Gini Reticker, and Jonathan Sehring)
2001	Karlovy Vary International Film Festival	Nominated	Crystal Globe	Blow
2003	National Board of Review of Motion Pictures	Nominated	William K. Everson Film History Award	A Decade Under the Influence (Shared with Richard LaGravenese)
2003	Sundance Film Festival	Nominated	Grand Jury Prize	A Decade Under the Influence (Shared with Richard LaGravenese)
