= Amanda Demme =

American photographer and creative director

- Born: Amanda Scheer; Washington, D.C., United States
- Education: Boston University
- Occupations: Photographer, creative director, nightlife producer, music supervisor, label owner, artist manager
- Spouse: Ted Demme (m. 1994; died 2002)
- Website: amandademme.com

Amanda Scheer Demme is an American photographer and creative director. Previously a music supervisor, label owner, and artist manager, she is best known as a nightlife producer. Demme was described by the Los Angeles Times as an "expert at 'building a room,' choosing a precise mix of guests, sculpting space with light and shadow, and cultivating a mood something akin to performance art." She conceptualized and shot the award-winning #theemptychair image for New York magazine's 2015 cover story "Bill Cosby: The Women."

Demme served as the music supervisor for more than 40 films and television shows, including Mean Girls, Garden State, Judgment Night and Blow. Her first solo show as a photographer took place in Venice, Los Angeles in May 2013.

== Early life and education ==
Demme was born in Washington, D.C., and grew up in Potomac, Maryland. She began playing tennis at 8, and played competitively into college as a member of Boston University's tennis team. She graduated from BU in 1985 with a degree in food and hotel administration.

== Career ==
=== New York ===
At 21, Demme moved to New York City, where she worked as a doorgirl at The World. In the late 1980s, after working for the New Music Seminar, Sleeping Bag Records, and in the hip-hop department at Arista Records, Demme began promoting underground hip hop shows at Carwash, a club she created at an abandoned Lower East Side high school. At Carwash, she held DJ and MC contests and booked then-new artists and rap acts, including KRS-One, Leaders of the New School, Afrika Bambaataa, Digital Underground.

=== Los Angeles ===
==== Buzztone, Immortal, Ventrue, Cheeba Sounds ====
Demme moved to Los Angeles in 1993 after meeting Happy Walters, with whom she founded Buzztone Management and later Immortal Records. In addition to the overall management of the company, she served as Immortal's creative director and in an a&r capacity. Through Buzztone, she and Walters managed artists including Cypress Hill, House of Pain and Pop's Cool Love, who were notably featured on the first-ever MTV Unplugged episode of Yo! MTV Raps.

After releasing several well-received albums, including debuts by Korn and Incubus, Demme and Walters parted ways. Demme subsequently created Ventrue Records in association with Rick Rubin's American Recordings, and gained attention via the guerilla marketing campaigns she developed for Ventrue artists including Lordz of Brooklyn and Psychotica. She was also associated with Cheeba Sounds, an imprint of Virgin Records, who released records by Nikka Costa and D'Angelo, among others.

==== Music Supervisor ====
Demme's first project as a music supervisor was for the 1993 film Judgment Night. The subject of significant critical acclaim, the soundtrack paired hip-hop artists with rock and metal bands. She went on to serve as the music supervisor for the films Garden State, Mean Girls, Blow, Erin Brockovich and Slackers, among others, as well as the television series Felicity and the series Freaks and Geeks.

==== Supermarket Media ====
In 2002, Demme founded Supermarket Media, an events-film-music-marketing collective with Brent Bolthouse, Jenifer Rosero, and Dominique Trenier. Among other projects, Demme designed and promoted events for organizations including Rock the Vote and Step Up as well as for corporate clients such as Mercedes-Benz, DKNY, Vogue and Motorola.

==== Nightclubs: The Tropicana Bar and Teddy's ====
In 2004, Demme returned to her role as a nightclub impresaria, turning Monday nights into Los Angeles's "new 'it' night" at the Sunset Tower Hotel, an Art Deco landmark on Sunset Boulevard. In 2005, after working on an extensive renovation and rebranding campaign, she opened two nightclubs at the Hollywood Roosevelt Hotel, The Tropicana Bar and Teddy's.

The Tropicana Bar, which Demme co-owned and operated, opened in June, and was an immediate success. In a matter of weeks, "celebrities packed the poolside Tropicana Bar, and anybody else who made it past Demme's velvet rope could consider it a career achievement in itself." In October she opened Teddy's, which was equally successful, and with celebrities present every night, it became a "paparazzi heaven." Credited for transforming the Roosevelt into the "hottest joint in town," Demme personally oversaw the door, and the exclusivity of Teddy's was even more extreme than it was at the Tropicana Bar, with the LA Weekly noting that she was both "celebrated and vilified for her in-crowd-only gatherings." However, Demme's Roosevelt clubs were short-lived; with frequent complaints of underage drinking and noise, as well as a dismissed discrimination suit filed against the Roosevelt by football player Terrell Davis, her contract with the hotel was terminated in 2006.

Demme, who had become progressively more interested in physical design, next launched H. Wood, in the former location of the Stork, a club adjacent to the Kodak Theatre in Hollywood. Designing the exterior of the club with bricks that were salvaged from a decommissioned naval base and windows from Andy Warhol's Factory, Demme said she viewed the project as an art installation. "It's more of an exterior palette where people can create their own experience. It's a condensed version of those pockets of street culture that you find in incredible urban settings," she stated in a 2008 interview with Women's Wear Daily. Although it was referred to by the media as Demme's comeback, her involvement with the club was limited, and in 2010, she began to focus on photography.

==== Photography ====
The first exhibit of Demme's photography took place at the Obsolete Gallery in Venice, Los Angeles in May 2013. Composed of oversized portraits, her work was described by the LA Times as "emotional and dark, even cinematic." In addition to her fine art photography, Demme has shot editorially for Interview, New York, Flaunt and others.

Demme conceptualized and shot the July 2015 cover story "Cosby: The Women." Composed of 35 black-and-white portraits of women who spoke publicly about being sexually assaulted by Bill Cosby, and an empty chair which represented unreported assaults, the image galvanized discussions about sexual assault on social media via the hashtag #theemptychair. The cover was described as "brilliantly conceived and executed" in Time, who included it on their list of the top magazine covers of 2015. Salon wrote: "In Amanda Demme's composite photographs of (the women) seated in stark wooden chairs against a white background, the magnitude of Cosby's many crimes is ripped from a half-forgotten past into an unforgiving present."

== Personal life ==
Demme was married to Ted Demme, with whom she had two children, Jaxon and Dexter. They were married from 1993 until his death in 2002.
