= Why We Suck =

Book by Denis Leary

Why We Suck: A Feel Good Guide to Staying Fat, Loud, Lazy and Stupid
- Author: Denis Leary
- Language: English
- Media type: Print, Audiobook

Why We Suck: A Feel Good Guide to Staying Fat, Loud, Lazy and Stupid is a 2008 book written by actor and comedian Denis Leary.

== Overview ==
Leary is credited on the book cover as "Dr. Denis Leary", a reference to a joke from his 1993 stand-up special, No Cure for Cancer. During the show he mentions he wants to write a self-help book entitled "Shut the Fuck Up, by Dr. Denis Leary", with the "advice" being telling the people seeking help the one thing no one has ever told them to do ("shut the fuck up"), which he believes would help people more than actual advice.

Leary also uses the "Doctor" title because of an honorary doctorate bestowed upon him by his alma mater Emerson College. "Sure it's just a celebrity type of thing-they only gave it to me because I'm famous." Leary jokes. "But it's legal and it means I get to say I'm a doctor – just like Dr. Phil!" In the book, he refers to Dr. Phil as "Dr. Full".

The book reached #7 on the New York Times Best Sellers list in December, 2008.

== Controversy ==
In the book, Leary wrote:

There is a huge boom in autism right now because inattentive mothers and competitive dads want an explanation for why their dumb-ass kids can't compete academically, so they throw money into the happy laps of shrinks... to get back diagnoses that help explain away the deficiencies of their junior morons. I don't [care] what these crackerjack whack jobs tell you – your kid is not autistic. He's just stupid. Or lazy. Or both.

Leary later stated that the quote was taken out of context and that in that paragraph he had been talking about what he calls the trend of "unwarranted" over-diagnosis of autism, which he attributed to American parents seeking an excuse for behavioral problems and under-performance. Later, he apologized to parents with autistic children whom he had offended.
