= A Decade Under the Influence (film) =

2003 documentary film directed by Ted Demme and Richard LaGravenese

- Directed by: Ted Demme; Richard LaGravenese
- Produced by: Richard LaGravenese
- Music by: John Kimbrough
- Distributed by: Independent Film Channel
- Release date: January 19, 2003 (Sundance Film Festival)
- Running time: 138 minutes
- Country: United States
- Language: English

A Decade Under the Influence is a 2003 American documentary film, directed by Ted Demme (posthumously released) and Richard LaGravenese. It was produced by Independent Film Channel.

== Summary ==
It is about the "turning point" in American cinema in the 1970s: New Hollywood. This was the final film that Ted Demme directed before his death at the age of 38 from a heart attack.

== Inspiration ==
The title comes from the 1974 John Cassavetes film A Woman Under the Influence.

== Reception ==
The film has a 77% approval rating on the website Rotten Tomatoes, based on 30 reviews. The website's consensus reads, "Packed with amusing anecdotes and told through the perspective of those it lionizes, A Decade Under the Influence is too one-sided to serve as a comprehensive dissection of 1970s American film, but will still work a treat for movie buffs."

== Cast ==
- Robert Altman
- John G. Avildsen
- Warren Beatty (archive footage)
- Linda Blair (archive footage)
- Peter Bogdanovich
- Peter Boyle (archive footage)
- Marshall Brickman
- Ellen Burstyn
- John Calley
- Jimmy Carter (archive footage)
- John Cassavetes (archive footage)
- Julie Christie
- Jill Clayburgh (archive footage)
- Clint Eastwood
- Peter Fonda (archive footage)
- Francis Ford Coppola
- Miloš Forman
- Roger Corman
- Bruce Dern
- William Friedkin
- Pam Grier
- Monte Hellman
- Dennis Hopper
- Sidney Lumet
- Paul Mazursky
- Michael Murphy (archive footage)
- Polly Platt
- Roy Scheider
- Sydney Pollack
- Jerry Schatzberg
- Paul Schrader
- Martin Scorsese
- Sissy Spacek
- Robert Towne
- Jon Voight

== See also ==
- Easy Riders, Raging Bulls, the book by Peter Biskind about American cinema in the 1970s that was also made into a 2003 documentary
