= Lock 'n Load (album) =

Studio album by Denis Leary
- Released: November 18, 1997
- Genre: Comedy
- Length: 77:56
- Label: A&M
- Producer: Chris Phillips, Joe Blaney, Greg Dulli

Denis Leary chronology
No Cure for Cancer (1993)	Lock 'n Load (1997)	Merry F %$in' Christmas (2004)

Professional ratings
Review scores
Source	Rating
Allmusic	4.5/5 stars

Lock 'n Load is Denis Leary's second album, co-written with Chris Philips and released in 1997. It features material by Adam Roth, Janeane Garofalo and Jeff Garlin, and music by Greg Dulli. It was also an HBO television special directed by Ted Demme. The album features clips of Leary's onstage stand-up monologues mixed with various skits and songs. It is designed to sound as though the listener is listening to the radio, with frequent cuts as though the station is being changed.

== Track listing ==
1. Fuck This – 0:25
2. Asshole of the Dance – 4:37
3. Marv Marv Marv – 2:12
4. Save This – 3:26
5. Deaf Mute Cocktail Party – 2:22
6. Coffee – 7:56
7. Beer – 4:19
8. Fuck Santa – 1:22
9. Elvis and I – 4:23
10. I'm Happy – 0:11
11. Fuck the Kennedys – 1:06
12. President Leary – 4:47
13. A Reading from the Book of Apple – 1:32
14. Love Barge – 6:19
15. Fat Fucks – 5:50
16. Insane Cowboy (In Africa) – 1:12
17. My Kids – 16:04
18. Life's Gonna Suck – 1:43
19. Fuck the Pope – 3:22
20. Lock 'n Load – 4:39

== Personnel ==
- Denis Leary – vocals, spoken vocals
- Chris Phillips – vocals, guitar, bass, harmonica
- Greg Dulli – guitar, keyboards, piano, sampler
- Dave Hillis – guitar, programming, drum loops, sampler
- Adam Roth – guitars, vocals
- C.P. Roth – bass, keyboards
- Mike Horrigan – drums, bass
- Pete Mark – drums, percussion
- Don Castagno – drums
- Jeff Garlin - composer, "Insane Cowboy (In Africa)"
- Janeane Garofalo - herself
- Donal Logue - himself
- Joe Blaney - recording engineer, producer
- John Seymour - studio engineer
- Dave Hills - engineer
- Jay Vacari - remix engineer
- Steve Remote - chief engineer
