= Long Walk to Forever (film) =

- Directed by: John A. Gallagher
- Written by: Kurt Vonnegut Jr. John A. Gallagher
- Produced by: Marino Amoruso; Sam Sarowitz
- Starring: Denis Leary; Dana Nathan
- Cinematography: Michael E. Smith
- Edited by: Michael E. Smith
- Music by: Adam Roth
- Production company: Alsa Productions
- Distributed by: A&E Television Networks
- Release date: October 10, 1987
- Running time: 20 minutes
- Country: United States
- Language: English

Long Walk to Forever is an American 1987 drama short film, shot in Clayton, Georgia, and is also one of Denis Leary's early appearances.

== Plot ==
When he hears that the girl next door is getting married, Newt goes AWOL from the Army and hitch-hikes home to convince her to marry him.
