= Lenny Clarke =

American actor (born 1953)

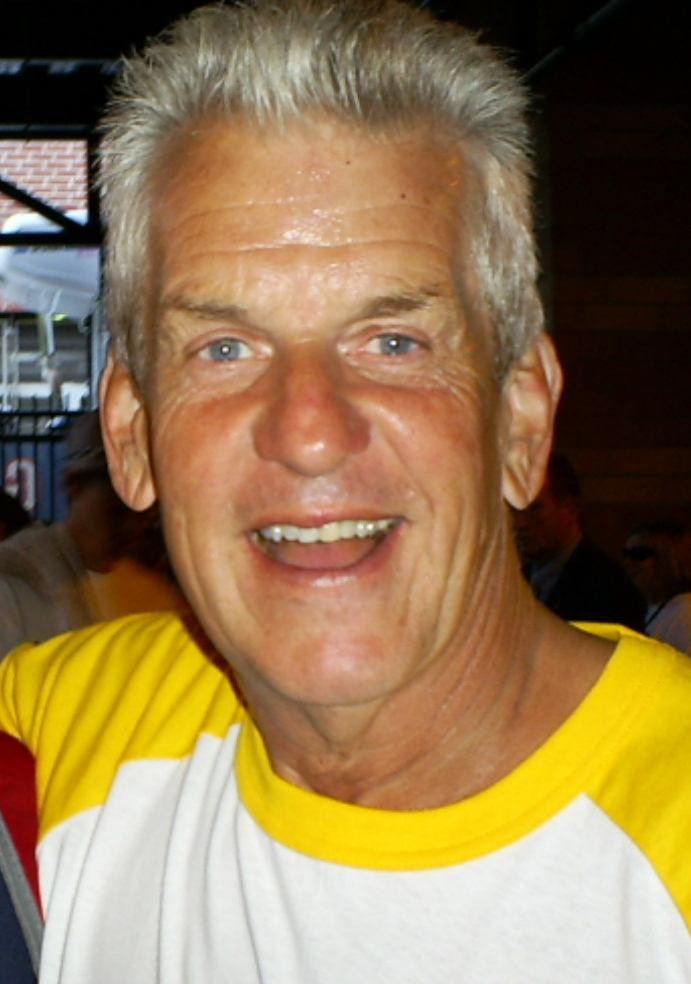
- Clarke in 2006
- Born: September 16, 1953 (age 73); Cambridge, Massachusetts, U.S.
- Education: University of Massachusetts Boston
- Spouse: Jennifer Miller (m. 1996)

Comedy career
- Years active: 1980–present
- Medium: Stand-up, film, television
- Website: Official website

Lenny Clarke (born September 16, 1953) is an American comedian and actor. He is known for his thick Boston accent and as the role of Uncle Teddy Gavin in the television series Rescue Me.

== Early life ==
Clarke was born in Cambridge, Massachusetts on September 16, 1953. In his early life, he attended Cambridge Latin High School (CLHS), graduating in 1972. He also attended college at the University of Massachusetts Boston, graduating in 1979. Lenny Clarke was a Cambridge City Council candidate in 1975; he also tried to campaign for mayor.

== Career ==
He was the most famous "saloon comic" in Boston during the 1980s, the heyday of the Boston comedy scene. The DVD release When Standup Stood Out (2006) details Clarke's early career and affiliations with other famous Boston comics, such as Steven Wright and Denis Leary, his good friends. In 1980, Clarke wrote and starred in a local television show Lenny Clarke's Late Show featuring Wright and Leary, in collaboration with Boston comedy writer Martin Olson. Clarke and Olson were roommates, and their apartment, known by comedians as "The Barracks", was a notorious "crash pad" for comics visiting Boston, per the film.

Clarke starred in his own short-lived network sitcom Lenny, and in such TV shows as Contest Searchlight, The Job, The John Larroquette Show and It's All Relative and movies like Monument Ave. and Southie. He was also appeared in several Farrelly Brothers movies, including There's Something About Mary, Me, Myself, & Irene, and Fever Pitch.

From 2004 to 2011, Clarke appeared in the recurring role of Uncle Teddy Gavin on the FX comedy drama Rescue Me.

In 2006, Clarke and Leary appeared on television during a Red Sox telecast and, upon realizing that Red Sox first baseman Kevin Youkilis is Jewish, delivered a criticism of Mel Gibson's antisemitic comments.

In 2007, Clarke played the role of Ron Abbot on the short lived Fox comedy series The Winner. On May 16, 2007, the show was cancelled after six episodes due to low ratings.

Clarke is also an occasional guest on the WEEI radio shows in Boston. It was on this show that he announced he would be a regular on the 2009 Fox sitcom Brothers as the racist neighbor who is married to a black woman. He wound up appearing in three episodes before the series was cancelled. In the 2011-12 TV season, he landed a role as the main character's father on the NBC mid-season replacement sitcom Are You There, Chelsea?.

On the evening of January 19, 2010, Clarke appeared on stage at the victory speech of Republican Senator-elect from Massachusetts Scott Brown, who was elected to the U.S. Senate seat formerly held by Ted Kennedy.

He had appeared on ESPN's 30 for 30 - 4 Days in October alongside ESPN sports and pop culture columnist Bill Simmons as a narrator giving insight on the 2004 ALCS comeback by the Red Sox against the New York Yankees.

== Filmography ==
=== Films ===
Year	Film	Role	Director	Notes
1987	Smart Alex		Steve Oedekerk	
1988	The Wrong Guys	Cab Driver	Danny Bilson	
1996	Two If by Sea	Kelly	Bill Bennett	
1997	Meet Wally Sparks	Joey	Peter Baldwin	
1998	Monument Ave.	Skunk	Ted Demme	
1998	Southie	Fat Eddie	John Shea	
1998	Getting Personal	L.J.	Ron Burrus	
1998	There's Something About Mary	Fireman	Peter and Bobby Farrelly	
1998	Rounders	Savino	John Dahl	
2000	Me, Myself & Irene	Barber Shop Car Owner	Peter and Bobby Farrelly	
2000	Massholes	Cop	John Chase	
2001	What's the Worst That Could Happen?	Windham	Sam Weisman	
2002	Moonlight Mile	Gordy	Brad Silberling	
2003	Stuck on You	Jailhouse Comic	Peter and Bobby Farrelly	
2003	Just Another Story	Jelly	GQ	
2004	Lemony Snicket's A Series of Unfortunate Events	Gruff Grocer	Brad Silberling	
2005	Fever Pitch	Uncle Carl	Peter and Bobby Farrelly	
2007	Sides	Lenny	Franco Trombino	
2007	The Child King	Tow Truck Owner	Frank Kerr	
2008	What Doesn't Kill You	Hogie	Brian Goodman	
2010	Hosed	Lenny	Marc A. Dole	Short film
2011	The Restaurant	Mario	Robert Scali	Short film
2012	Here Comes the Boom	Loud Dietrich Fan	Frank Coraci	
2014	Lazarus Rising	Father Parsons	John Depew	
2015	Three Sheets	Lucky	Rufus Chaffee	
2015	Ted 2	Cop	Seth MacFarlane	
2016	Ghostbusters	Coffee House Ghost	Paul Feig	Extended Edition Only
2017	Stronger	Uncle Bob	David Gordon Green	
2021	Halloween Kills	Phil Dickerson	David Gordon Green	
2025	Methadone Mile	Johnny Hickey		

=== TV series ===
Year	Title	Role	Notes
1990	Lenny	Lenny Callahan	Series Lead (1990–1991)
1991	The Sunday Comics	Host	
1993	The John Larroquette Show	Officer Adam Hampton	1993–1996
1998	Love Boat: The Next Wave	Casey O'Keefe	1.01 "Smooth Sailing"
1999	Touched by an Angel	Larry	6.03 "The Last Day of the Rest of Your Life"
2001	The Job	Frank Harrigan	2001–2002
2002	7th Heaven	Lenny	7.06 "Regarding Eric"
2003	It's All Relative	Mace O'Neil	2003–2004
2004	Rescue Me	Uncle Teddy	2004–2011
2007	The Winner	Ron Abbott	
2009	Brothers	Lenny	1.05 "Lenny"; 1.06 "Commercial/Coach DMV"; 1.11 "Christmas"
2010	Four Days in October	Himself	
2010	'Til Death	Mr. Donnelly	4.23 "Joy's Mom"
2011	Burn Notice: The Fall of Sam Axe	Rawlins	Television film
2012	Are You There, Chelsea?	Melvin Newman	
2013	Clear History	Poker Buddy	Television film
2013	DECo.	Jim Zimmer	1.01 "Pilot"; 1.04 "The Visit"
2014	Sirens	Johnny's Father	1.04 "Famous Last Words"; 1.06 "The Finger"; 1.10 "Shotgun Wedding"
2014	Wicked Bites	Himself	1.22 "Pitching in for Kids with the Boston Red Sox"
2019	SMILF	Zaggy	2.01 "Sh*t Man, I've Literally Failed"
2020	Defending Jacob	Food Truck Guy	
2024	Extended Family	Bobby Kearney	Recurring Role

=== Producer/executive producer ===
Year	Title	Notes
2002	Contest Searchlight	

=== Writer ===
Year	Title	Notes
1985	Nothin' Goes Right	Uncredited
1991	The Sunday Comics	
2002	Comedy Central Presents	6.05 "Lenny Clarke"
