= Douchebags and Donuts =

- DVD cover
- Directed by: Susan Locke; Joe Perota
- Starring: Denis Leary; Whitney Cummings; Lenny Clarke; Adam Ferrara
- Distributed by: Comedy Central
- Release date: January 18, 2011
- Running time: 99 minutes
- Country: United States
- Language: English

Douchebags and Donuts is a stand-up comedy film hosted by comedian Denis Leary, released by Comedy Central.

The DVD was released by Comedy Central on January 18, 2011, containing special features, deleted scenes and all completely uncensored and uncut.
