= Contest Searchlight =

- Genre: Comedy
- Created by: Jim Serpico
- Starring: Denis Leary; Lenny Clarke
- Country of origin: United States
- Original language: English
- No. of seasons: 1
- No. of episodes: 4

Production
- Running time: 30 minutes
- Production company: Apostle

Original release
- Network: Comedy Central
- Release: August 1 – September 1, 2002

Contest Searchlight is a four-episode scripted comedy television series that aired in 2002 on the Comedy Central network. It was a documentary-style parody or mockumentary of the HBO (and later Bravo) network's reality television series Project Greenlight.

Contest Searchlight starred Denis Leary and Lenny Clarke, playing slightly fictionalized versions of themselves, as TV producers holding a nationwide contest to select a new television series to produce for the Comedy Central network. When none of the proposed submissions prove acceptable, Leary and Clarke end up combining several of the finalist's proposals to produce a new, semi-improvised ensemble sitcom entitled "Jesus and the Gang." The new show ostensibly stars New York City theatre and television actor Peter Gallagher (again playing a fictionalized version of himself), but when Gallagher is hit by a motorist during the filming of a network promotion, the lead role is shifted to comedian Patrice O'Neal. During rehearsals for the premiere episode, the actors, crew and producers all start fighting each other (and themselves), and "Jesus and the Gang" is permanently shelved.

Contest Searchlight was shown in a pseudo-documentary style, and there was no laugh track or other obvious sign that this was a fictional series. Following Peter Gallagher's exit from the show, both he and Comedy Central received a number of panicked calls from viewers who believed that Gallagher really had been hit by a motorist.

A fully produced version of the "Jesus and the Gang" theme song appears as the eighth track on Leary's 2004 album, Merry F#%$in' Christmas.
