= Richard LaGravenese =

American screenwriter and film director (born 1959)

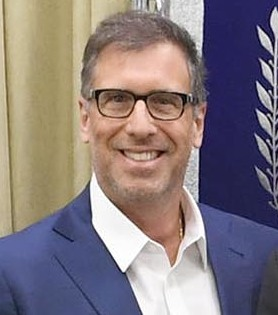
- LaGravenese in September 2017
- Born: October 30, 1959 (age 66); New York City, U.S.
- Occupations: Screenwriter; film director
- Years active: 1989–present
- Spouse: Ann Weiss
- Children: 1

Richard LaGravenese (/ləˈɡrɑːvəneɪz/; born October 30, 1959) is an American screenwriter and film director, known for The Fisher King, The Bridges of Madison County, and Behind the Candelabra.

== Personal life ==
LaGravenese was born in Brooklyn, New York, the son of a taxi driver. He is of Italian descent. He graduated from New York University's Tisch School of the Arts in 1980 with a bachelor of fine arts degree in acting.

== Career ==
LaGravenese wrote The Fisher King on spec in the late 1980s. It was acquired by Stacey Sher, Lynda Obst, Debra Hill's production company and subsequently directed by Terry Gilliam. For writing the film, LaGravenese received a nomination for the Academy Award for Best Original Screenplay.

In New York City during the early 1980s, billed as "The Double R" comedy duo, in collaboration with playwright Richard O'Donnell, LaGravenese co-penned and consecutively performed in several Off-Off-Broadway productions including Spare Parts, Blood-Brothers at The 78th Street Theatre Lab, The Lion Theatre, and West Bank Cafe.

LaGravenese wrote an adaptation for the famously on-and-off version of the musical Gypsy for Barbra Streisand. In 2015, he revealed that he'd spent several months working on the script with Streisand. "I had the best time with her. I can't even tell you. It was like a fantasy come true. I did my first draft and went to her house to do rewrites. She's so meticulous in the best possible way. We went through it page by page by page.

== Filmography ==
=== Film ===
Year	Title	Director	Writer	Producer	Notes
1989	Rude Awakening	No	Yes	No	
1991	The Fisher King	No	Yes	No	
1994	The Ref	No	Yes	Yes	
1995	A Little Princess	No	Yes	No	
1995	The Bridges of Madison County	No	Yes	No	
1995	Unstrung Heroes	No	Yes	No	
1996	The Mirror Has Two Faces	No	Yes	No	
1998	The Horse Whisperer	No	Yes	No	
1998	Living Out Loud	Yes	Yes	No	
1998	Beloved	No	Yes	No	
2003	A Decade Under the Influence	Yes	No	No	Documentary film
2006	Paris, je t'aime	Yes	Yes	No	Segment: "Pigalle"
2007	Freedom Writers	Yes	Yes	No	
2007	P.S. I Love You	Yes	Yes	No	
2010	Conviction	No	Uncredited	No	
2011	Water for Elephants	No	Yes	No	
2013	Beautiful Creatures	Yes	Yes	No	
2014	The Last Five Years	Yes	Yes	Yes	
2014	Unbroken	No	Yes	No	
2016	The Comedian	No	Yes	No	
2022	Disenchanted	No	Story	No	
2024	A Family Affair	Yes	No	No	

=== Television ===
Year	Title	Writer	Executive Producer	Creator	Notes
2013	Behind the Candelabra	Yes	No	No	Television film
2014	The Divide	Yes	Yes	Yes	
2026	The Murder of JonBenét Ramsey	Yes	Yes	No	
