= Asshole (song) =

Single by Denis Leary

from the album No Cure for Cancer
- Released: 1993
- Genre: Comedy rock
- Length: 4:26
- Label: A&M
- Songwriters: Denis Leary; Chris Phillips

"Asshole" is a song by American comedian Denis Leary, released as the only single from his album No Cure for Cancer in 1993.

== Song information ==
In a 2008 appearance on The Opie and Anthony Show, comedian Louis CK claimed that Leary stole his "I'm an asshole" routine, which was then expanded upon and turned into a hit song by Leary. On a later episode of the same show, Leary challenged this assertion by claiming that he (Leary) co-wrote the song with Chris Phillips.

== Reception ==
In North America, the music video for "Asshole" received airplay on MTV and MuchMusic in a censored form. In Australia, the song became a hit; it reached No. 2 on the ARIA Singles Chart, ended 1994 as Australia's 26th-most-successful single, earned a platinum sales certification, and was voted No. 1 on the Triple J Hottest 100 poll of 1993. The song also charted in New Zealand, where it peaked at No. 22 on the RIANZ Singles Chart, and in the United Kingdom, reaching No. 58 on the UK Singles Chart in January 1996.

== Later versions ==
On August 3, 2016, Leary appeared on the US talk show The Late Late Show with James Corden, during which he performed an updated version of the song in character as Bill Clinton, in duet with James Corden playing a caricature of US Presidential candidate Hillary Clinton and criticizing rival candidate Donald Trump. For broadcast, the "-hole" part of the title was bleeped, a fact that is discussed by Leary and Corden during the song.

Leary and Jimmy Fallon performed a version with updated lyrics on The Tonight Show Starring Jimmy Fallon on January 23, 2025.

== Charts ==
=== Weekly charts ===
Chart (1994–1996)	Peak position
Australia (ARIA)	2
New Zealand (Recorded Music NZ)	22
Scotland Singles (OCC)	79
UK Singles (OCC)	58

=== Year-end charts ===
Chart (1994)	Position
Australia (ARIA)	26

== Certifications ==
Region	Certification	Certified units/sales
Australia (ARIA)	Platinum	70,000^{^}
^{^} Shipments figures based on certification alone.
