= Denis Leary =

American comedian and actor (born 1957)

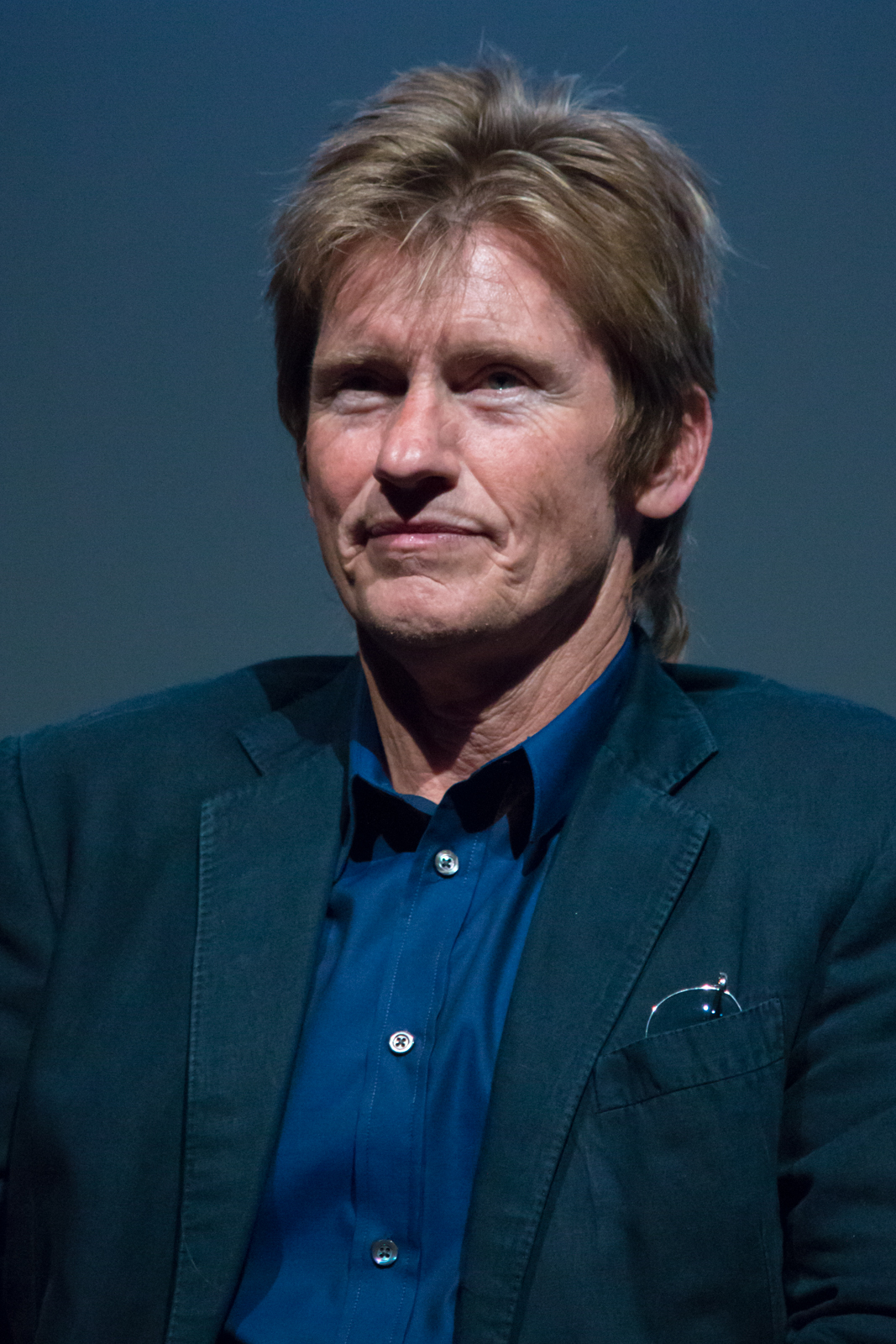
- Leary at the 2015 ATX TV Festival
- Born: Denis Colin Leary; August 18, 1957 (age 69); Worcester, Massachusetts, U.S.
- Citizenship: United States; Ireland
- Education: Emerson College
- Occupations: Stand-up comedian; actor
- Labels: Comedy Central; A&M
- Spouse: Ann Lembeck (m. 1989)
- Children: 2
- Relatives: Conan O'Brien (third cousin once removed)

Comedy career
- Years active: 1980–present
- Medium: Stand-up; film; television
- Genres: Observational comedy; black comedy; insult comedy; musical comedy

Denis Colin Leary (born August 18, 1957) is an American stand-up comedian and actor. He first came to prominence as a stand-up comedian, especially through appearances on MTV (including the comedic song "Asshole") and through the stand-up specials No Cure for Cancer (1993) and Lock 'n Load (1997). Leary began taking roles in film and television starting in the 1990s, including substantial roles in the films Judgment Night (1993), Demolition Man (1993), The Ref (1994), Two If By Sea (1996), Suicide Kings (1997), Wag the Dog (1997), Monument Ave. (1998), and The Thomas Crown Affair (1999).

In the 2000s, Leary developed and starred in the television show The Job (2001–2002) and was the star and co-creator of Rescue Me (2004–2011), for which he received three Primetime Emmy nominations, one for writing and two for acting. He received another Emmy nomination for his portrayal as Michael Whouley in the political drama television film Recount (2008). Leary has continued to take starring roles in films, including Captain George Stacy in The Amazing Spider-Man and Cleveland Browns head coach Vince Penn in Draft Day. He has done voice work, including Francis in A Bug's Life and Diego in the Ice Age franchise.

From 2015 to 2016, Leary wrote and starred in the comedy series Sex & Drugs & Rock & Roll on FX.

== Early life ==
Denis Colin Leary was born on August 18, 1957, in Worcester, Massachusetts, the son of Catholic immigrant parents from Killarney, County Kerry, Ireland. His mother, Nora (née Sullivan; 1927–2025), was a maid, and his father, John Leary (1924–1985), was an auto mechanic. He is a citizen of both the United States and Ireland. He is a third cousin once removed of talk show host and fellow comedian Conan O'Brien.

Leary attended Saint Peter-Marian High School in Worcester and graduated from Emerson College in Boston. At Emerson, he befriended fellow comic Mario Cantone. While a student, Leary founded the Emerson Comedy Workshop, a troupe that continues on the campus today.

After graduating from Emerson in 1981, Leary taught comedy-writing classes at the school for five years. In May 2005, he received an honorary doctorate and spoke at his alma mater's undergraduate commencement ceremony; and is credited as Dr. Denis Leary on the cover of his 2009 book Why We Suck.

== Career ==
Leary began working as a comedian at the Boston underground club Play It Again Sam's. His first real gig was at the Rascals Comedy Club as part of the TV show The Rascals Comedy Hour, on October 18, 1990. Leary wrote and appeared on a local comedy series, Lenny Clarke's Late Show, hosted by his friend Lenny Clarke and written by Martin Olson. Leary and Clarke both spoke about their early affiliations and influences in the Boston comedy scene in the documentary film When Standup Stood Out (2006). During Leary's time as a Boston-area stand-up comic, he developed his stage persona.

Leary appeared in sketches on the MTV game show Remote Control, playing characters such as Keith Richards, co-host Colin Quinn's brother, and artist Andy Warhol. He earned fame when he ranted about R.E.M. in an early 1990s MTV sketch. Several other commercials for MTV quickly followed, in which Leary would rant at high speeds about a variety of topics, playing off the then-popular and growing alternative scene. One of these rants served as an introduction to the video for "Shamrocks and Shenanigans (Boom Shalock Lock Boom)" by House of Pain. Leary released two records of his comedy: No Cure for Cancer (1993) and Lock 'n Load (1997). In late 2004, he released the EP Merry F %$in' Christmas, which included a mix of new music, previously unreleased recordings and some tracks from Lock 'n Load.

In 1993, Leary's sardonic song "Asshole", about the stereotypical American male, achieved much notoriety. The song was voted No. 1 on the Triple J Hottest 100 poll of 1993. and was used in Holsten Pils ads in the UK, with Leary's participation, and with adapted lyrics criticizing a drunk driver. The single was a minor hit there, peaking at No. 58 in the UK Singles Chart in January 1996.

In 1995, Leary was asked by Boston Bruins legend Cam Neely to help orchestrate a Boston-based comedy benefit show for Neely's cancer charity; this became Comics Come Home, which Leary has hosted annually ever since.

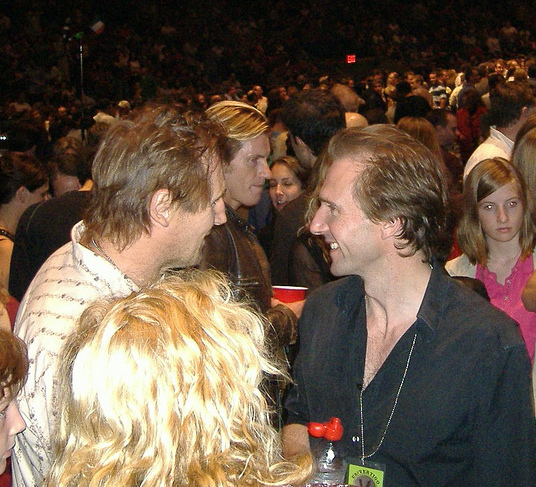
Leary behind Liam Neeson and Ralph Fiennes at a U2 concert in Madison Square Garden, October 2005

Leary has appeared in many films, including The Sandlot (1993) (as Scott's stepfather Bill), Demolition Man (1993) (as an Emmanuel Goldstein-esque revolutionary to Nigel Hawthorne's Big Brother), Judgment Night (1993), The Ref (1994), Gunmen (1994), Operation Dumbo Drop (1995), Wag the Dog (1997), Suicide Kings (1997), The Matchmaker (1997), Monument Ave. (1998), The Thomas Crown Affair (1999) Dawg (2002), and Draft Day (2014). He had a role in Oliver Stone's Natural Born Killers (1994) that was eventually cut. He held the lead role in two television series, The Job and Rescue Me. He co-created the latter, in which he played Tommy Gavin, a New York City firefighter dealing with alcoholism, family dysfunction and other issues in post-9/11 New York City.

Leary received Emmy Award nominations in 2006 and 2007 for Outstanding Lead Actor in a Drama Series for Rescue Me, and in 2008 for Outstanding Supporting Actor in a Miniseries or a Movie for the HBO movie Recount. Leary was offered the role of Dignam in The Departed (2006) but turned it down because of scheduling conflicts with Rescue Me. He provided voices for characters in animated films, such as a fire-breathing dragon named Flame in the series The Agents, a pugnacious ladybug named Francis in A Bug's Life (1998) and a prehistoric saber-toothed tiger named Diego in the Ice Age film series. He has produced numerous movies, television shows, and specials through his production company, Apostle; these include Comedy Central's Shorties Watchin' Shorties, the stand-up special Denis Leary's Merry F#$%in' Christmas and the movie Blow (2001).

As a Boston Red Sox fan, Leary narrated the official 2004 World Series film. In 2006, Leary and Lenny Clarke appeared on television during a Red Sox telecast and, upon realizing that Red Sox first baseman Kevin Youkilis is Jewish, delivered a criticism of Mel Gibson's antisemitic comments. As an ice hockey fan, Leary hosted the National Hockey League video NHL's Greatest Goals. In 2003, he was the subject of the Comedy Central Roast of Denis Leary.

Leary did the TV voiceover for MLB 2K8 advertisements, using his trademark rant style in baseball terms, and ads for the 2009 Ford F-150 pickup truck. He has also appeared in commercials for Hulu and DirecTV's NFL Sunday Ticket package. Leary was a producer of the Fox series Canterbury's Law, and wrote and directed its pilot episode. Canterbury's Law aired in the spring of 2008 and was canceled after eight episodes. On September 9, 2008, Leary hosted the sixth annual Fashion Rocks event, which aired on CBS. In December of the year, he appeared in a video on funnyordie.com critiquing a list of some of his "best" films, titled "Denis Leary Remembers Denis Leary Movies". Also in 2008, Leary voiced a guest role as himself in The Simpsons episode "Lost Verizon".

On March 21, 2009, Leary began the Rescue Me Comedy Tour in Atlantic City, New Jersey. The 11-date tour, featuring Rescue Me co-stars Lenny Clarke and Adam Ferrara, was Leary's first stand-up comedy tour in 12 years. The Comedy Central special Douchebags and Donuts, filmed during the tour, debuted on American television on January 16, 2011, with a DVD release on January 18, 2011.

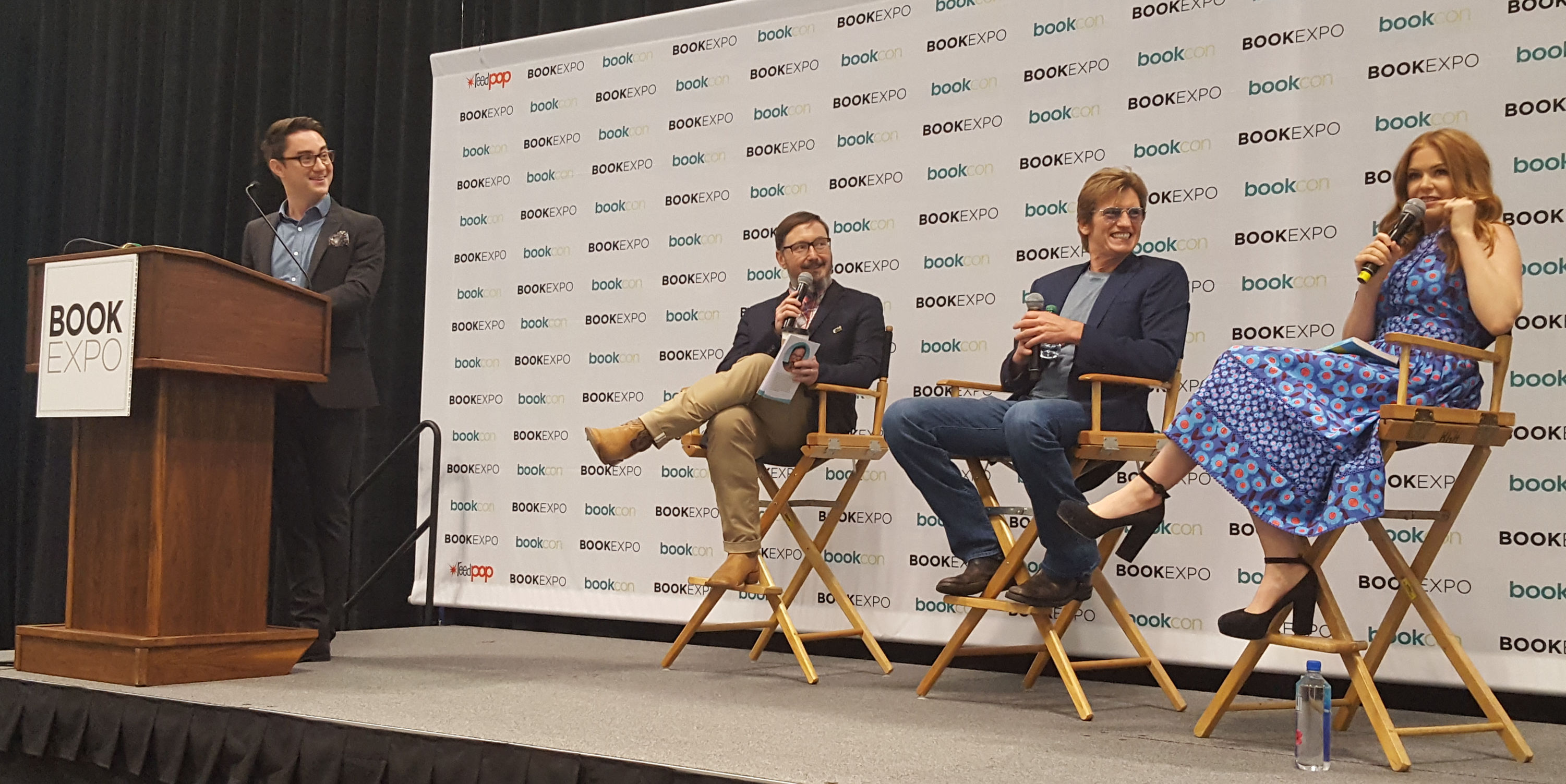
Leary at the BookExpo America in 2017

Leary played Captain George Stacy in the movie The Amazing Spider-Man, released in July 2012. He wrote the American adaptation of Sirens. Leary is an executive producer of the documentary Burn, which chronicles the struggles of the Detroit Fire Department. Burn won the 2012 Tribeca Film Festival Audience Award.

Leary created a television series for FX called Sex & Drugs & Rock & Roll, taking the starring role himself. A 10-episode first season was ordered by FX, with the premiere on July 16, 2015. The show ran for two seasons.

In 2022, Leary was cast in the recurring role of Frank Donnelly, an NYPD officer on Law & Order: Organized Crime.

Leary has been the narrator for NESN's documentary show about the Boston Bruins called Behind the B since the show began in 2013.

== Personal life ==
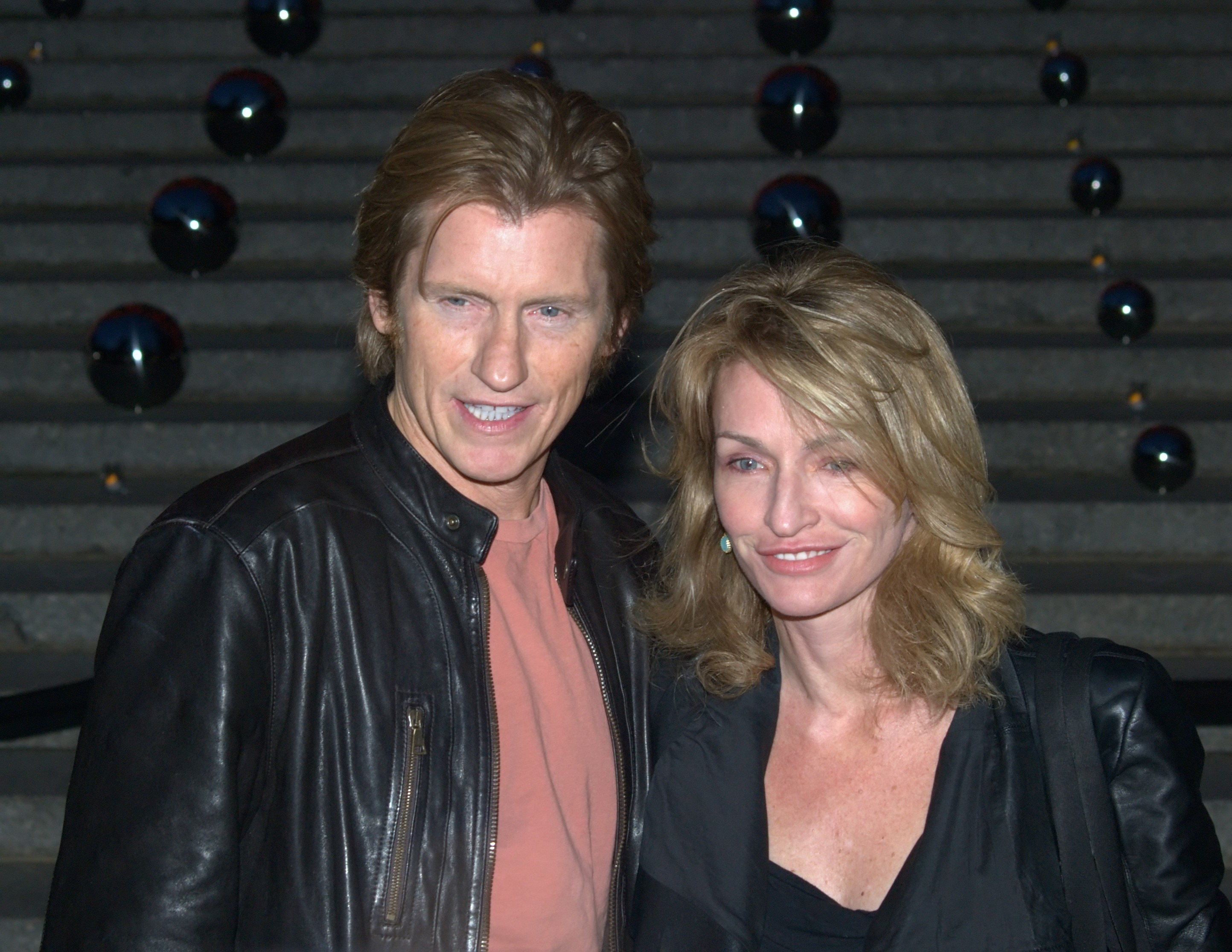
Leary and his wife Ann Lembeck at the 2010 Tribeca Film Festival

Leary has been married to author Ann Lembeck Leary since 1989. They met when he was her instructor in an English class at Emerson College. They have two children. Ann Leary published a memoir, An Innocent, a Broad, about the premature birth of their son on a visit to London. She has also written a novel, Outtakes From a Marriage, which was published in 2008. Her second novel, The Good House, was published in 2013. Her essay in a New York Times column about her marriage to Denis inspired the Modern Love series Episode 4: "Rallying to Keep the Game Alive". They live in Tribeca, Manhattan. They also have a house in Katonah, New York and previously owned a farm in Roxbury, Connecticut.

Leary is an ice hockey fan and had a backyard rink at his home in Roxbury, Connecticut, with piping installed under the ice surface to help it stay frozen. He is a fan of the Boston Bruins, Boston Celtics, and Boston Red Sox, as well as the Green Bay Packers.

Leary describes himself as a "Jack Kennedy Democrat" with some conservative ideologies, including support for the military. Leary told Glenn Beck, "I was a life-long Democrat, but now at my age, I've come to realize that the Democrats suck, and the Republicans suck, and basically the entire system sucks. But you have to go within the system to find what you want."

Leary has said of his religious beliefs, "I'm a lapsed Catholic in the best sense of the word. You know, I was raised with Irish parents, Irish immigrant parents. My parents, you know, prayed all the time, took us to Mass. And my father would sometimes swear in Gaelic. It doesn't get more religious than that. But, no, after a while, they taught us wrong. I didn't raise my kids with the fear of God. I raised my kids with the sense of, you know, to me, Jesus was this great guy...."

Leary is godfather to Damian Hurley, the son of actress Elizabeth Hurley.

== Leary Firefighters Foundation ==
On December 3, 1999, six firefighters from Leary's hometown of Worcester were killed in the Worcester Cold Storage Warehouse fire. Among the dead were Leary's cousin Jerry Lucey, as well as Leary's close childhood friend, Lt. Tommy Spencer. In response, the comedian founded the Leary Firefighters Foundation. Since its creation in the year 2000, the foundation has distributed over $US2.5 million to fire departments in the Worcester, Boston and New York City areas for equipment, training materials, new vehicles and new facilities. Leary won $125,000 for the foundation on the game show Who Wants to Be a Millionaire.

A separate fund run by Leary's foundation, the Fund for New York's Bravest, has distributed over $2 million to the families of the 343 firemen killed in the September 11 attacks in 2001, in addition to providing funding for necessities such as a new mobile command center, first-responder training, and a high-rise simulator for the New York City Fire Department's training campus. As the foundation's president, Leary has been active in all of the fundraising. In the aftermath of Hurricane Katrina in New Orleans, Leary donated over a dozen boats to the New Orleans Fire Department to aid in rescue efforts in future disasters. The foundation also rebuilt entire NOLA firehouses.

== Controversies ==
=== Plagiarism ===
For many years, Leary had been friends with fellow comedian Bill Hicks. When Leary's comedy album No Cure for Cancer was released, Leary was accused of stealing Hicks' act and material, ending their friendship abruptly. In April 1993, the Austin Comedy News remarked on the similarities of Leary's performance: "Watching Leary is like seeing Hicks from two years ago. He smokes with the same mannerisms. (Hicks recently quit.) He sports the same attitude, the same clothes. He touches on almost all of the same themes. Leary even invokes Jim Fixx." When asked about this, Hicks told the magazine, "I have a scoop for you. I stole his [Leary's] act. I camouflaged it with punchlines, and to really throw people off, I did it before he did".

At least three stand-up comedians have gone on the record stating they believe Leary stole Hicks' material, comedic persona and attitude. One similar routine was about the so-called Judas Priest "suicide trial," during which Hicks says, "I don't think we lost a cancer cure."

During Leary's 2003 Comedy Central Roast, comedian Lenny Clarke, a friend of Leary's, said there was a carton of cigarettes backstage from Bill Hicks with the message, "Wish I had gotten these to you sooner." This joke was cut from the final broadcast.

The feud is also mentioned in Cynthia True's biography American Scream: The Bill Hicks Story:

Leary was in Montreal to host the "Nasty Show," at Club Soda, and Colleen was coordinating the talent so she was standing backstage when she heard Leary doing material that sounded incredibly similar to old Hicks riffs, including his perennial Jim Fixx joke: ("Keith Richards outlived Jim Fixx, the runner and health nut dude. The plot thickens."). When Leary came offstage, Colleen, more stunned than angry, said, "Hey, you know that's Bill Hicks' material! Do you know that's his material?" Leary stood there, stared at her without saying a word and briskly left the dressing room.

According to the book, True said that upon hearing a tape of Leary's album No Cure for Cancer, "Bill was furious. All these years, aside from the occasional jibe, he had pretty much shrugged off Leary's lifting. Comedians borrowed, stole stuff and even bought bits from one another. Milton Berle and Robin Williams were famous for it. This was different. Leary had, practically line for line, taken huge chunks of Bill's act and recorded it."

In a 2008 appearance on The Opie and Anthony Show, comedian Louis C.K. claimed Leary stole his "I'm an asshole" routine, which was then expanded upon and turned into a hit song by Leary. On a later episode of the same show, Leary challenged this assertion by claiming to have co-written the song with Chris Phillips.

=== Autism ===
In his 2008 book Why We Suck: A Feel Good Guide to Staying Fat, Loud, Lazy and Stupid, Leary wrote:

There is a huge boom in autism right now because inattentive mothers and competitive dads want an explanation for why their dumb-ass kids can't compete academically, so they throw money into the happy laps of shrinks... to get back diagnoses that help explain away the deficiencies of their junior morons. I don't [care] what these crackerjack whack jobs tell you – your kid is not autistic. He's just stupid. Or lazy. Or both.

Leary later stated that the quote was taken out of context and that in that paragraph he had been talking about what he calls the trend of "unwarranted" over-diagnosis of autism, which he attributed to American parents seeking an excuse for behavioral problems and under-performance. Later, he apologized to parents with children diagnosed with autism whom he had offended.

== Filmography ==
=== Comedy specials ===
Year	Title	Role	Notes
1993	Denis Leary: No Cure for Cancer	Himself	Showtime special
1997	Denis Leary: Lock 'N Loaded	Himself	HBO special
2005	Merry F#%$in' Christmas	Himself	Christmas special
2011	Douchebags and Donuts	Himself	Comedy Central special

=== Film ===
Year	Title	Role	Notes
1987	Long Walk to Forever	Newt	Short film
1991	Strictly Business	Jake	Cameo
1993	Loaded Weapon 1	Mike McCracken	Cameo; performing "You Really Got Me"
1993	The Sandlot	Bill	
1993	Who's the Man?	Sergeant Cooper	
1993	Demolition Man	Edgar Friendly	
1993	Judgment Night	Fallon	
1994	The Ref	Gus	
1994	Gunmen	Armor O'Malley	
1994	Natural Born Killers	Prison Inmate	Director's cut; cameo
1995	Operation Dumbo Drop	CW3 David Poole	
1995	The Neon Bible	Frank	
1996	Underworld	Johnny Crown/Johnny Alt	
1996	Two If by Sea	Francis "Frank" O'Brien	Also writer
1997	Love Walked In	Jack Hanaway	Also producer
1997	Wag the Dog	Fad King	
1997	Suicide Kings	Lono Veccio	
1997	The Real Blonde	Doug	
1997	The Matchmaker	Nick	
1998	Monument Ave.	Bobby O'Grady	a.k.a. Snitch; Also uncredited writer
1998	Wide Awake	Mr. Beal	
1998	Small Soldiers	Gil Mars	
1998	A Bug's Life	Francis (voice)	
1999	True Crime	Bob Findley	
1999	Jesus' Son	Wayne	
1999	Do Not Disturb	Simon	
1999	The Thomas Crown Affair	Det. Michael McCann	
2000	Sand	Teddy	
2000	Lakeboat	The Fireman	
2000	Company Man	Officer Fry	
2001	Double Whammy	Det. Raymond Pluto	Also uncredited producer
2001	Final	Bill	performing "Little Sister"
2001	Blow	—N/a	Producer only
2002	Dawg	Douglas "Dawg" Munford	a.k.a. Bad Boy
2002	Ice Age	Diego (voice)	
2002	The Secret Lives of Dentists	Slater	
2003	When Stand Up Stood Out	Himself	Documentary
2003	The Curse of the Bambino	Himself	Documentary
2003	Reverse of the Curse of the Bambino	Himself	Documentary (sequel)
2006	Ice Age: The Meltdown	Diego (voice)	
2009	Ice Age: Dawn of the Dinosaurs	Diego (voice)	
2012	The Amazing Spider-Man	George Stacy	
2012	Ice Age: Continental Drift	Diego (voice)	
2014	Draft Day	Coach Penn	
2014	The Amazing Spider-Man 2	George Stacy	
2015	Freaks of Nature	Rick Wilson	
2016	Ice Age: Collision Course	Diego (voice)	
2023	Spider-Man: Across the Spider-Verse	George Stacy	Archival footage from The Amazing Spider-Man
2025	Oh. What. Fun.	Nick Clauster	
2027	Ice Age: Boiling Point †	Diego (voice)	In development

Key
†	Denotes films that have not yet been released

=== Television ===
Year	Title	Role	Notes
1980	Lenny Clarke's Late Show	Various	Series regular
1987–1990	Remote Control	Various roles	All episodes
1990	Afterdrive	Himself	Talk show
1990	Rascals Comedy Hour	Himself	Stand Up
1994–1995	Mike & Spike	Charles S. Baby	3 episodes
1995	National Lampoon's Favorite Deadly Sins	Jake	Television film, also directed segment "Lust"
1996	The Second Civil War	Vinnie Franko	Television film
1997	Subway Stories	Guy in wheelchair	Television film
1998	The Late Late Show with Tom Snyder	Himself	1 episode
1998	Fantasy World Cup	Himself	1 episode
1998	Space Ghost Coast to Coast	Himself	Episode: "Waiting for Edward"
2001–2002	The Rosie O'Donnell Show	Himself	Guest
2001–2002	The Job	Mike McNeil	Also writer and producer
2002	Contest Searchlight	Himself	All episodes
2002	Crank Yankers	Joe Smith (voice)	Episode: 1.2
2004–2011	Rescue Me	Tommy Gavin	93 episodes; also creator, producer and writer
2006–2014	The Late Late Show with Craig Ferguson	Himself	12 episodes
2008	The Simpsons	Himself (voice)	Episode: "Lost Verizon"
2008	Recount	Michael Whouley	Television film
2011	Ice Age: A Mammoth Christmas	Diego (voice)	TV special
2013	Maron	Himself	Episode: "Dead Possum"
2015	Benders	—N/a	Executive producer
2015–2016	Sex & Drugs & Rock & Roll	Johnny Rock	Also creator, producer, writer and director
2016	The Late Late Show with James Corden	Bill Clinton	
2016	Ice Age: The Great Egg-Scapade	Diego (voice)	TV special
2018–2022	Animal Kingdom	Billy	Recurring role (season 3); guest role (seasons 4, 6)
2019	Family Guy	Body Shop Owner (voice)	Episode: "Girl, Internetted"
2019–2021	The Moodys	Sean Moody Sr.	Main role; also executive producer
2022	Law & Order: Organized Crime	Frank Donnelly	Recurring role
2024	No Good Deed	Mikey	Main role
2025–26	Going Dutch	Colonel Patrick Quinn	Lead role, also executive producer

=== Video games ===
Year	Title	Role	Notes
2006	Ice Age 2: The Meltdown	Diego	
2012	Ice Age: Continental Drift – Arctic Games	Diego	
2013	Ice Age Village	Diego	Mobile game
2015	Ice Age Avalanche	Diego	Mobile game

== Discography ==
=== Albums ===
- No Cure for Cancer (1993)
- Lock 'n Load (1997)
- Merry F#%$in' Christmas (2004)

=== Singles ===
- "Asshole" (1993)
- "At the Rehab" (2009)
- "Douchebag" (2011)
- "Kiss My Ass" (2012)

== Bibliography ==
- 1992: No Cure for Cancer, Anchor Books ISBN 0385425813
- 2007: Rescue Me: Uncensored: The Official Companion, Newmarket Press ISBN 978-1557047915
- 2008: Why We Suck: A Feel Good Guide to Staying Fat, Loud, Lazy and Stupid, Viking ISBN 978-0-670-03160-3
- 2010: Suck on This Year: LYFAO @ 140 Characters or Less, Viking ISBN 978-0-670-02289-2
- 2012: Denis Leary's Merry F#%$in' Christmas, Running Press ISBN 0762447621
- 2017: Why We Don't Suck: And How All of Us Need to Stop Being Such Partisan Little Bitches, Crown Archetype ISBN 978-1524762735

== Awards ==
Year	Result	Award	Category	Film/Show
2009	Nominated	Golden Globe Awards	Best Performance by an Actor in a Supporting Role in a Series, Mini-Series or Motion Picture Made for Television	Recount (2008)
2008	Nominated	Emmy Awards	Outstanding Supporting Actor in a Miniseries or a Movie	Recount (2008)
2007	Nominated	Emmy Awards	Outstanding Lead Actor in a Drama Series	Rescue Me
2007	Nominated	Satellite Awards	Best Actor in a Series, Drama	Rescue Me
2007	Nominated	Prism Awards	Performance in a Drama Series, Multi-Episode Storyline	Rescue Me
2006	Nominated	Emmy Awards	Outstanding Lead Actor in a Drama Series	Rescue Me
2006	Nominated	Satellite Awards	Best Actor in a Series, Drama	Rescue Me
2006	Nominated	Prism Awards	Performance in a Drama Series, Multi-Episode Storyline	Rescue Me
2005	Nominated	Emmy Awards	Outstanding Writing for a Drama Series	Rescue Me
2005	Nominated	Golden Globe Awards	Best Performance by an Actor in a Television Series – Drama	Rescue Me
2005	Nominated	Satellite Awards	Best Actor in a Series, Drama	Rescue Me
2003	Nominated	Kids' Choice Awards	Favorite Voice from an Animated Movie	Ice Age
2003	Nominated	DVD Exclusive Awards	Best Actor	Double Whammy (2001)
2002	Nominated	Television Critics Association Awards	Individual Achievement in Comedy	The Job
2000	Won	Blockbuster Entertainment Awards	Favorite Supporting Actor – Drama/Romance	The Thomas Crown Affair (1999)
1996	Won	CableACE Awards	Best Directing: Comedy	National Lampoon's Favorite Deadly Sins (1995)
1992	Won	Edinburgh International Arts Festival	Critic's Award	No Cure for Cancer (1992)
1992	Won	BBC Festival	Recommendation Award	No Cure for Cancer (1992)
