= B-Train Films =

Film production company

B-Train Films is a "production company" based in New York, NY. Founded in 2002 by Executive Producer William Zagger, B-Train staff has been involved with broadcasts for the Olympics, NFL, MLB, NBA, World Cup, ESPN's SportsCentury, Oakland Raiders, New York Jets, and Cleveland Browns.

== B-Train Audio Projects ==
B-Train Films Sound has collaborated with advertising agencies including BBDO, Young & Rubicam, Ogilvy & Mather, Agency Sacks, and McCann Erickson.
