= Blow (film) =

2001 American biographical crime film by Ted Demme

- Theatrical release poster
- Directed by: Ted Demme
- Written by: David McKenna; Nick Cassavetes
- Based on: Blow by Bruce Porter
- Produced by: Ted Demme; Joel Stillerman; Denis Leary
- Starring: Johnny Depp; Penélope Cruz; Franka Potente; Rachel Griffiths; Paul Reubens; Jordi Mollà; Ray Liotta
- Cinematography: Ellen Kuras
- Edited by: Kevin Tent
- Music by: Graeme Revell
- Production companies: Spanky Pictures; Aposte
- Distributed by: New Line Cinema
- Release date: April 6, 2001
- Running time: 124 minutes
- Country: United States
- Language: English
- Budget: $30 million
- Box office: $83.3 million

Blow is a 2001 American biographical crime drama film produced and directed by Ted Demme, about an American cocaine kingpin and his international network. David McKenna and Nick Cassavetes adapted Bruce Porter's 1993 book Blow: How a Small Town Boy Made $100 Million with the Medellín Cocaine Cartel and Lost It All for the screenplay. It is based on the real-life stories of U.S. drug trafficker George Jung (played by Johnny Depp) and his connections including narcotics kings Pablo Escobar and Carlos Lehder Rivas (portrayed in the film as Diego Delgado), and the Medellín Cartel.

== Plot ==
George Jung and his parents Fred and Ermine live in Weymouth, Massachusetts. When George is 10 years old, Fred files for bankruptcy but tries to make George realize that money is not important.

In the late 1960s, an adult George moves to Los Angeles with his friend "Tuna"; they meet Barbara, a flight attendant, who introduces them to Derek Foreal, a marijuana dealer. With Derek's help, George and Tuna make a lot of money. Kevin Dulli, a visiting college student from Boston, tells them of the demand for marijuana back home. They start selling marijuana there, buying marijuana directly from Mexico with the help of Santiago Sanchez, a Mexican drug lord. Two years later, George is caught in Chicago trying to import 660 pounds (300 kg) of marijuana and is sentenced to two years' imprisonment. After unsuccessfully trying to plead his innocence, George skips bail to take care of Barbara, who dies from cancer. Her death marks the disbanding of the group of friends.

While hiding from the authorities, George visits his parents. George's mother calls the police, who arrest him. He is sentenced to 26 months in a federal prison in Danbury, Connecticut. His cellmate Diego Delgado has contacts in the Medellin cartel and convinces George to help him go into the cocaine business. Upon his release from prison, George violates his parole conditions and heads down to Cartagena, Colombia to meet with Diego. They meet with cartel officer Cesar Rosa to negotiate the terms for smuggling 15 kilograms (33 lb) to establish "good faith".

As the smuggling operation grows, Diego is arrested, leaving George to find a way to sell 50 kg (110 lb). George reconnects with Derek in California, and the two sell all the cocaine in record time. George then goes to Medellín, Colombia and meets Pablo Escobar, who agrees to go into business with them. With the help of Derek, the pair became Escobar's top U.S. importer. At Diego's wedding, George meets Cesar's fiancée Mirtha and later marries her. However, Diego resents George for keeping Derek's identity secret and pressures George to reveal his connection. George eventually discovers that Diego has betrayed him by cutting him out of the connection with Derek. Inspired by the birth of his daughter and a drug-related heart attack, George severs his relationship with the cartel.

All goes well with George's newfound civilian life for five years, until Mirtha organizes a 38th birthday party for him. Many of his former drug associates attend, including Derek, who reveals that Diego cut him out as well. The FBI and DEA raid the party and arrest George. He becomes a fugitive, and his bank account—heretofore under Manuel Noriega's protection in Panama—is seized by Noriega. One night, he and Mirtha get into a fight while driving. They are pulled over by police and Mirtha tells them George is a fugitive and has stashed a kilogram of cocaine in his trunk. He is sent to jail for three years. During his term, Mirtha divorces him and takes custody of their nine-year-old daughter, Kristina Sunshine Jung.

Upon his release, George struggles to maintain his relationship with his daughter. He promises Kristina a vacation in California and seeks one last deal to garner enough money for the trip. George completes a deal with former accomplices but learns too late that the deal had been set up by the FBI and DEA, with Dulli and Derek having leaked the nature and location of the action in exchange for pardons for their involvement in his prior action. George is sentenced to 60 years at Otisville Correctional Facility in upstate New York. He explains in the end that neither the sentence nor the betrayal bothered him, but that he can never forgive himself for having to break a promise to his daughter.

While in prison, George requests a furlough to see his dying father, Fred. His mother denies the request. George records a final message to Fred, recounting his memories of working with his father, his run-ins with the law, and finally, too late, his understanding of what Fred meant when he said that money is not "real". An old man in prison, George imagines that his daughter finally comes to visit him. She slowly fades away as a guard calls for George. The film concludes with notes indicating that Jung will not be eligible for parole until 2015 and that his daughter has yet to visit him.

== Cast ==
- Johnny Depp as George Jung
  - Jesse James as Young George
- Penélope Cruz as Mirtha Jung
- Franka Potente as Barbara "Barbie" Buckley
- Rachel Griffiths as Ermine Jung
- Paul Reubens as Derek Foreal (Richard Barile)
- Jordi Molla as Diego Delgado (Carlos Lehder)
- Cliff Curtis as Pablo Escobar
- Max Perlich as Kevin Dulli
- Miguel Sandoval as Augusto Oliveras
- Ethan Suplee as "Tuna"
  - Alan James Morgan as Young "Tuna"
- Ray Liotta as Frederick "Fred" Jung
- Elizabeth Rodriguez as Martha Oliveras
- Kevin Gage as Leon Minghella
- Tony Amendola as Santiago Sanchez
- Bobcat Goldthwait as Mr. T
- Michael Tucci as Dr. Bay
- Monet Mazur as Maria
- Lola Glaudini as Rada
- Jennifer Gimenez as Inez
- Emma Roberts as Kristina Sunshine Jung
  - Jaime King as Older Kristina

== Soundtrack ==
Blow's soundtrack is a compilation of songs and artists from the 1950s to the 1970s. Graeme Revell also composed the original score for the film.

=== Track listing ===
Tracklist adapted from Discogs.

No.	Title	Artist	Length
1.	"Can't You Hear Me Knocking"	The Rolling Stones	7:17
2.	"Rumble"	Link Wray	2:26
3.	"Glad and Sorry"	Faces	3:07
4.	"Strange Brew"	Cream	2:48
5.	"Black Betty"	Ram Jam	2:31
6.	"Blinded by the Light"	Manfred Mann's Earth Band	7:08
7.	"Let's Boogaloo"	Willie Rosario	3:32
8.	"Keep It Comin' Love"	KC and the Sunshine Band	3:54
9.	"Yellow World"	J. Girls	2:57
10.	"That Smell"	Lynyrd Skynyrd	5:49
11.	"All the Tired Horses"	Bob Dylan	3:11
12.	"Can't You See"	Marshall Tucker Band	6:04
13.	"Push & Pull"	Nikka Costa	4:48

== Release ==
Blow was released to North American theaters on April 6, 2001. To promote the film, pocket-size rectangular mirrors were distributed at advance screenings. The promotional items attracted criticism for appearing to promote cocaine use, as the mirrors resembled ones used to cut cocaine.

With a budget of roughly $30 million, Blow managed to earn $53 million domestically and $30 million internationally for a worldwide total of $83,282,296.

== Reception ==
The film holds an approval rating of 56% at Rotten Tomatoes, based on 142 reviews, with a weighted average score of 5.8/10. The site's consensus is: "With elements that seem borrowed from movies like Goodfellas and Boogie Nights, Blow is pretty much been-there-done-that despite another excellent performance from Johnny Depp. It, also, becomes too sentimental at the end." On Metacritic, the film has a weighted average score of 52 out of 100, based on 34 critics, indicating "mixed or average" reviews. Audiences polled by CinemaScore gave the film an average grade of "A−" on an A+ to F scale.

Rob Gonsalves from eFilmCritic.com gave the film four out of five stars stating: "Blow isn't really a classic, but it's a sobering story well-told."

Roger Ebert gave the film two and a half out of four stars; he questioned the value of making Jung the subject of this film, stating: "That's the thing about George [Jung]. He thinks it's all about him. His life, his story, his success, his fortune, his lost fortune, his good luck, his bad luck. Actually, all he did was operate a toll gate between suppliers and addicts. You wonder, but you never find out, if the reality of those destroyed lives ever occurred to him." David Nusair of Reel Films also questioned making a film about Jung, stating "The biggest problem with Blow is that Jung is such a complete moron." Nusair concludes that while it "is not a bad film ... the central character of George Jung just doesn't seem worthy to be the center of attention."

Christopher Smith from Bangor Daily News gave the film a "D+", stating "Blow is ultimately more about charisma than it is about truth, more about Depp's smooth strut and tousled hair than it is about George Jung's fatal flaws—his stupidity, desperation, ego and small-town greed."

Penélope Cruz was nominated for the Golden Raspberry Award for Worst Actress for her performances in Blow as well as Captain Corelli's Mandolin and Vanilla Sky.
