= The Ref =

1994 film by Ted Demme

- Theatrical release poster
- Directed by: Ted Demme
- Written by: Richard LaGravenese; Marie Weiss
- Produced by: Ron Bozman; Richard LaGravenese; Jeffrey Weiss
- Starring: Denis Leary; Judy Davis; Kevin Spacey; Glynis Johns; Raymond J. Barry
- Cinematography: Adam Kimmel
- Edited by: Jeffrey Wolf
- Music by: David A. Stewart
- Production companies: Touchstone Pictures; Don Simpson/Jerry Bruckheimer Films
- Distributed by: Buena Vista Pictures Distribution
- Release date: March 11, 1994
- Running time: 97 minutes
- Country: United States
- Language: English
- Budget: $12 million
- Box office: $11 million

The Ref (Hostile Hostages in some countries) is a 1994 American black comedy film directed by Ted Demme, written by Richard LaGravenese and Marie Weiss, and starring Denis Leary, Judy Davis, and Kevin Spacey. The plot centers on a burglar who, while evading capture from the police, is forced to take a bickering, dysfunctional family hostage on Christmas Eve. The burglar finds himself having to act as a de facto marriage counselor, or "referee", between the squabbling husband and wife, a situation that becomes more complicated when the husband's relatives drop by for Christmas dinner.

The film was released by Buena Vista Pictures Distribution on March 11, 1994 and was a box office disappointment, though positive reviews praised its dark humor, dialogue, and performances. It later found a wider audience through home video and cable television airings, becoming a cult movie and an alternative to traditional Christmas movies during the holiday season.

== Plot ==
On Christmas Eve in an affluent Connecticut hamlet, Lloyd and Caroline Chasseur are in a marriage counseling session with therapist Dr. Wong. Caroline has had an affair, and Lloyd is miserable and blames the behavioral problems of their 15-year-old son Jesse on his wife's coddling of him. Caroline, meanwhile, calls out Lloyd for his inability to stand up to his domineering mother, Rose.

In the same town, cat burglar Gus is in the midst of stealing jewelry from a mansion. His plan goes awry when he accidentally sets off the alarm and is chased out by a guard dog. His getaway car, driven by his partner Murray, is no longer there. At a convenience store, he runs into Lloyd and Caroline and takes them hostage, ordering them to drive him to their house. Along the way, Caroline and Lloyd keep arguing, with Gus having to repeatedly intercede and tell them to shut up.

At the Chasseur house, Gus has Lloyd and Caroline tied up while they continue to bicker. Knowing that Murray usually seeks refuge at seedy bars, Gus calls the local bar and manages to get in touch with him. He instructs Murray to steal a boat for their getaway. The police set up roadblocks and impose a curfew to look for Gus, while two officers go door-to-door. Lt. Huff, the police chief, is less than concerned because the town rarely sees criminal activity like this.

Jesse, who has been away at a military school, arrives home earlier than his parents expect. Unbeknownst to them, Jesse has been blackmailing the school's commanding officer, Siskel, with photographs of an affair. He is stashing the money with plans of running away. Gus has Jesse tied up along with his parents. Jesse, unhappy with his home life, pleads to join Gus into a life of crime. Gus calls Jesse out on his naivety and tells the boy he should appreciate his comfortable upbringing.

As the police search for Gus expands, he is forced to continue hiding out in the Chasseur home while waiting for Murray. Complicating matters are visiting neighbors, such as George, who is dressed up as Santa Claus and arrives to deliver a fruitcake for the family. Later, Lloyd's family—his brother Gary, sister-in-law Connie, their two children Mary and John, and Rose—arrive to celebrate Christmas Eve. Rose is extremely wealthy and bullies everyone in the family. To hide any suspicion that Lloyd and Caroline are being held hostage, Gus pretends to be Dr. Wong and tells Lloyd's family his presence is needed as part of "experimental therapy". Jesse is tied up and gagged upstairs in his parents' closet. During the family dinner, Caroline and Lloyd are unable to stop fighting, which comes to a head when Rose reveals that Lloyd told her about Caroline's affair, and Caroline demands a divorce. Gus' pointed comments goad Lloyd to finally stand up to his wife and his mother. Everyone finds out who Gus really is after Rose attempts to go upstairs; Gus has her tied up and gagged.

Siskel turns up at the door and reveals how he is being blackmailed. Jesse manages to untie himself, and his parents discover his hidden money. George, still dressed as Santa, but now very drunk, returns to the home, protesting why he never gets a gift in return. He spots the gun and realizes who Gus is but gets knocked out. The state police arrive, and Lloyd, having a change of heart, decides he cannot "spend [his] life sending everyone [he] care[s] about to prison." He instructs Jesse to take Gus to the docks using a path through the woods. Gus, in George's Santa suit, makes it safely to a boat where Murray awaits.

Back at home, the couple's bickering drives away the police. Having aired out their differences throughout the evening with Gus' assistance, they make up and decide to stay together. Their reconciliation is interrupted when John informs them that "grandma Rose is eating through her gag."

== Cast ==
- Denis Leary as Gus
- Judy Davis as Caroline Chasseur
- Kevin Spacey as Lloyd Chasseur
- Robert J. Steinmiller Jr. as Jesse Chasseur
- Glynis Johns as Rose Chasseur
- Raymond J. Barry as Lieutenant Huff
- Richard Bright as Murray
- Christine Baranski as Connie Chasseur
- Adam LeFevre as Gary Chasseur
- Phillip Nicoll as John Chasseur
- Ellie Raab as Mary Chasseur
- Bill Raymond as George
- John Scurti as Lieutenant Steve Milford
- Jim Turner as Phil
- Ron Gabriel as Limo Driver
- Edward Saxon as Mike Michaels
- Kenneth Utt as Jeremiah Willard
- Robert Ridgely as Bob Burley
- J.K. Simmons as Colonel Siskel
- BD Wong as Marriage Counselor Dr. Wong (uncredited)

== Production ==
Richard LaGravenese co-wrote the film with his sister-in-law Marie Weiss. It was inspired by their families. LaGravenese said, "Both Marie and I are Italian Catholics who married into Jewish families, so we do have those big holiday dinners." Weiss began writing the script in 1989 after she and her husband moved from New York to California. Inspiration came from an argument she had with him and she thought, "Wouldn't it be great if there were a third party to step in and referee?" She wrote several drafts and consulted with LaGravenese in 1991 and they took it to Disney. The studio approved the project within 20 minutes. LaGravenese spent a year revising the script until he finally got "tired of doing rewrites for executives."

The script was then put aside until director Ted Demme and comedian Denis Leary came across it. Demme had directed Leary in No Cure for Cancer, a stand-up comedy special for Showtime. The studio cast Leary based on the sarcastic funny-man persona he cultivated in MTV spots that Demme directed. Leary joined the project as part of a three-picture deal with Disney. Their involvement motivated LaGravenese to come back to the project. Executive producer Don Simpson described the overall tone of The Ref as "biting and sarcastic. Just my nature."

After test audiences responded poorly to the film's original ending—Gus turns himself in to show Jesse that a life of crime leads nowhere quickly—a new ending was shot in January 1994.

== Reception ==
=== Box office ===
The film opened on March 11, 1994, with its widest release in 861 theaters. Its total gross at the domestic box office was only $11,439,193, after coming in at #4 opening weekend, behind Guarding Tess, Lightning Jack and Ace Ventura: Pet Detective.

Leary blamed the film's poor box office performance on the studio's method of marketing, as they released the film in early spring rather than the holiday season and also chose to center his MTV-style persona in trailers and TV spots. "They did me like the MTV guy. And they shortchanged what the movie was all about," he said. Leary made fun of himself in a humorous article written for a 1995 issue of Playboy where he pretends to interview Pope John Paul II. Leary asked the Pope if he had seen The Ref, and the Pope responded that he was told it was very vulgar, as evident by its unpopularity.

=== Critical reception ===
On the review aggregator website Rotten Tomatoes, 73% of 56 critics' reviews are positive, with an average rating of 6.7/10. The website's consensus reads: "Undeniably uneven and too dark for some, The Ref nonetheless boasts strong turns from Denis Leary, Judy Davis, and Kevin Spacey, as well as a sharply funny script." On Metacritic, the film has an average weighted score of 59 out of 100 based on 27 critics' reviews, indicating "mixed or average reviews."

Caryn James of The New York Times called it "a grown-up film that delights in undermining Christmas cliches." She praised its "gleeful irreverence, dark wit and cynicism", adding, The Ref "is a film to warm the hearts and touch the nerves of dysfunctional families everywhere." The Los Angeles Times' Kenneth Turan said "its comic venom is refreshing for as long as it lasts". Many praised the casting and writing as among the film's strengths. Jeff Shannon of The Seattle Times said "the Australian Davis - for my money the finest actress around, bar none - is simply uncanny in her command of East Coast gentility combined with razor-sharp timing and comedic expression". Of Leary, James wrote, "Here he has subtly wiped the abrasiveness away from his [stand-up] style without making Gus seem mushy. For the first time he displays his appeal and potential as an actor instead of a comic with a sneering persona".

The Chicago Sun-Times' Roger Ebert gave the film three stars out of four. He wrote, "Material like this is only as good as the acting and writing. The Ref is skillful in both areas." Rolling Stone's Peter Travers praised the performances of Spacey and Davis, saying "They are combustibly funny, finding nuance even in nonsense. The script is crass; the actors never." Glenn Kenny of Entertainment Weekly gave it a grade of "A−", writing The Ref features "some of the sharpest dialogue heard in a Hollywood flick since the heyday of Hecht and MacArthur" and that "this nasty romp delivers so many honest laughs, you may end up watching it twice in the same night to make sure you weren't hallucinating".

Negative reviews opined that the film's biting humor went too far, with TV Guide writing that the film "can't sustain its defiantly misanthropic tone". Owen Gleiberman, also of Entertainment Weekly, gave the film a "C−" rating and wrote, "The Ref is crushingly blunt-witted and monotonous in its celebration of domestic sadism." In his review for The Washington Post, Hal Hinson criticized Leary's performance: "A stand-up comic trying to translate his impatient, hipster editorializing to the big screen, he doesn't have the modulation of a trained actor, only one speed (fast) and one mode of attack (loud)."

The film was among 500 nominated for AFI's 100 Years...100 Laughs list. Entertainment Weekly ranked the film at No. 51 in its list "61 Best Movies You've Never Seen."

In 2016, Jason Bailey wrote of the film for Flavorwire: "It was, if anything, a film ahead of its time; its cynical attitude towards the holidays predates Bad Santa by nearly a decade (and there are numerous other echoes of that film in this one), and its expert pivots between comedy and drama are more early 21st century than late 20th." Eric Walkuski of JoBlo called it "a Christmas movie for people who don't like Christmas movies, if you will".

== Year-end lists ==
- Top 10 (not ranked) – Betsy Pickle, Knoxville News-Sentinel
- Best "sleepers" (not ranked) – Dennis King, Tulsa World
- "The second 10" (not ranked) – Sean P. Means, The Salt Lake Tribune
- Dishonorable mention – William Arnold, Seattle Post-Intelligencer
- Dishonorable mention – Dan Craft, The Pantagraph

== Home media ==
The Ref was released on DVD by Buena Vista Home Entertainment on March 4, 2003.

== See also ==
- List of Christmas films
