= Merry F %$in' Christmas =

Merry F#%$in' Christmas

Studio album by Denis Leary
- Released: November 16, 2004
- Genre: Rock, comedy, Christmas
- Label: Comedy Central
- Producer: Denis Leary, Jim Serpico, Jack Vaughn Jr. (executive producer)

Denis Leary chronology
Lock 'n Load (1997)	Merry F#%$in' Christmas (2004)	At the Rehab (2009)

Professional ratings
Review scores
Source	Rating
AllMusic	3/5 stars

Merry F#%$in' Christmas is a 2004 comedy album released by comedian and actor Denis Leary. It runs for twenty minutes and includes unreleased sessions recorded for his 1997 album Lock 'n Load and two tracks previously released on that album ("Deaf Mute Cocktail Party" and "Insane Cowboy (In Africa)").

Since the holiday season of 2005, Comedy Central has periodically aired Denis Leary's Merry F#%$in' Christmas, an hour-long (with commercials) Christmas special featuring Leary and several celebrity guests, including Charlie Murphy, Carmen Electra, William Shatner, and the Barenaked Ladies. The song "Merry F#%$in' Christmas" is the title theme of the special, set to a parody of Rankin/Bass' signature "Animagic" stop-motion animation; no other tracks from the album appear in the special (though the cast performs a new live version of the title theme).

== Track listing ==
1. Merry F#%$in' Christmas (Studio)
2. Fat Guy On the Plane
3. Deaf Mute Cocktail Party
4. WWWW
5. Jack Goes to School
6. Insane Cowboy (In Africa)
7. Coffin Rap
8. The Theme From Jesus & The Gang
9. Dogsledding
10. Merry F#%$in' Christmas (Live)

== Personnel ==
- Denis Leary – spoken vocals
