= No Cure for Cancer =

1993 studio album by Denis Leary

Studio album by Denis Leary
- Released: January 12, 1993
- Recorded: 1992
- Genre: Stand up comedy / Comedy rock
- Length: 45 minutes
- Label: A&M
- Producers: Joe Blaney, Chris Phillips, Bill Hicks (Material source)

Denis Leary chronology
No Cure for Cancer (1993)	Lock 'n Load (1997)

Professional ratings
Review scores
Source	Rating
AllMusic	4/5 stars
The Independent	positive

The script for No Cure for Cancer was published as a book.

No Cure for Cancer is a Denis Leary standup routine from the early 1990s. It was made into a television special, a book, and a recorded album, all with the same title. Denis Leary's routine focuses on vegetarians, cigarette smoking, drug use, and political correctness.

== Album ==
This performance was recorded live at Irving Plaza, New York City on October 10, 1992, and at Sorcerer Studios, New York City.

=== Track listing ===
1. "Asshole" – 4:26
2. "Drugs" – 8:24
3. "Rehab" – 4:03
4. "More Drugs" – 7:06
5. "Smoke" – 5:28
6. "Meat" – 4:01
7. "Death" – 5:01
8. "The Downtrodden Song" – 1:22
9. "Traditional Irish Folk Song" – 2:00
10. "Voices in My Head" – 3:37

=== Personnel ===
- Denis Leary – vocals
- Adam Roth – guitar, mandolin, bass, vocals
- Chris Phillips – vocals, bass, acoustic and 12-string guitar
- Breda Mayock – violin
- Ger Mayock – pennywhistle
- C.P. Roth – keyboards
- Don Castagno – drums, percussion
- Pete Mark – congas
- Steve Remote – chief engineer
- Ted Jensen – mastering engineer

== Television special ==
The television version of No Cure for Cancer was first broadcast by Channel 4 in the United Kingdom on February 3, 1993, followed by Showtime in the United States on February 20, then in Australia on the Nine Network on April 6, 1994.

== DVD ==
In 2005, the DVD Complete Denis Leary was released. A collection of his most famous stand-up performances including: No Cure for Cancer and Lock 'n Load. Special features include: the music videos for "Asshole" and "Love Barge", and the Making of No Cure for Cancer, a documentary with Leary and others.

== Accusations of plagiarism of Bill Hicks ==
Although Leary had been friends with fellow comedian Bill Hicks for many years, when Hicks heard No Cure for Cancer, he felt that Leary had stolen his act. The friendship ended abruptly as a result, and was still unsettled when Hicks died of pancreatic cancer 13 months later, at the age of 32. Over the years, several comedians have publicly stated they believe Leary stole Hicks's persona and attitude, in addition to his material. Jokes on the album about Keith Richards, Judas Priest, smoking and "good men dying young" are frequently cited as bearing similarities to Hicks's routines.

According to Cynthia True's biography American Scream: The Bill Hicks Story, after listening to No Cure for Cancer, Hicks was furious. "All these years, aside from the occasional jibe, he had pretty much shrugged off Leary's lifting. Comedians borrowed, stole stuff and even bought bits from one another. Milton Berle and Robin Williams were famous for it. This was different. Leary had, practically line for line, taken huge chunks of Bill's act and recorded it."

In the August 2006 Playboy, an interviewer told Leary, "Much has been written about you and comedian Bill Hicks...People have accused you of appropriating his persona and material." Leary replied:

That's a great story that people like to latch onto...Very quickly we got New York club owners saying, 'You guys are too alike,' while I was saying, 'What are they fucking talking about?' It's the same approach to the subject maybe, but it's not the same act...But as I've said many times, a fable is sometimes better than the truth."

== Charts ==
Chart performance for No Cure for Cancer
Chart (1993–1994)	Peak position
Australian Albums (ARIA)	46
Canada Top Albums/CDs (RPM)	63
US Billboard 200	85
