= Ryan M. Kennedy =

American screenwriter and director

Ryan M. Kennedy is an American screenwriter and film director. His feature film debut An Act of War was released on March 31, 2015 in North America by Revolver Entertainment and is currently available on Netflix.

== Career ==
=== An Act of War ===
An Act of War (original title: The Projectionist) is a 2015 American thriller film written and directed by Kennedy and produced by Atit Shah. The film was released on Video on Demand and DVD March 31, 2015 by Revolver Entertainment. Create Entertainment is credited as a production company. It became available exclusively in North America on iTunes, Amazon, Hulu, Google Play, Vudu, Xbox Live, PlayStation Store and Amazon Video. With Cable VOD offerings on Dish and AT&T. On June 2, 2015 An Act of War expanded to the following VOD platforms in the US: Comcast; Verizon FIOS and Cox, Frontier, Telus, Rogers Cable and Shaw Communications in Canada. On June 3, 2015 the film was distributed across 3000 Walmart stores in the United States.

The film went live on Netflix July 15, 2015. InstantWatcher.com ranked the film in the top 10 most streamed films on Netflix during the first two weeks of its release.

It stars Russ Russo, Natasha Alam, Doug E. Doug, Joseph R. Gannascoli, Robert Miano and Kiowa Gordon. The story follows a recently returned veteran as he struggles to re-adapt to society and reconnect with the world he left behind prior to being deployed to Iraq.

An Act of War received generally favorable reviews. Aaron Peterson of The Hollywood Outsider said it was "a harrowing journey of a film that demands to be seen". Henrick Vartanian of Brave New Hollywood praised the film's depiction of soldiers with posttraumatic stress disorder, saying Russ Russo's performance "makes the complexity of the tormented soldier comprehensible to everyday public". The Movie Waffler reported "An Act of War is skillfully scripted and sensitively acted. Prior to its release, the picture won four film festival awards including Best Picture, Best Director and Best Actor at the New York-based Take Two Film Festival".

In February, 2014 the movie was hailed by Indiewire and Collider as the first film to ever have a limited release using Kickstarter prior to more mainstream film distribution".

Within the first two weeks of its nationwide release, An Act of War had been illegally and legally downloaded or streamed over 4 million times. The trailer has since garnered over 1 million hits on YouTube.
