= Thrill Kill Jack in Hale Manor =

Thrill Kill Jack in Hale Manor is a 2000 independent comedy film produced by the Hale Manor Collective, a trio of Connecticut filmmakers consisting of Mike Aransky, Phil Guerrette and Thomas Edward Seymour. The film parodies action/adventure flicks by following the mystical loner Thrill Kill Jack (played by Guerrette) in his search for a stolen magic gun within the booby-trapped mansion of a master criminal (played by Seymour).

According to Seymour in an interview published in the online magazine PulpLit, the film was shot “over a year’s period on weekends. Consequently the film’s scenery turns from summer to winter to spring all within about 80 minutes. The film only cost about $700 to make. We shot it on a Hi-8 that we had and did the editing on a crappy PC. The real cost of the film was video tape and renting a Beta deck to make our masters on.” The film played in festivals, gaining a Merit Award at the B-Movie Film Festival, and it was featured on Independent Film Channel's “Split Screen” when that show covered the 2000 Fangoria horror convention.

Thrill Kill Jack in Hale Manor was released on DVD in 2006.
