= Sorvino =

Sorvino is a surname derived from the Latin word "sorbum" meaning "tree" or fruit". Notable people with the surname include:

- Bill Sorvino, American stage and screen actor
- Michael Sorvino (born 1977), American actor and producer
- Mira Sorvino (born 1967), American actress
- Paul Sorvino (1939–2022), American actor, opera singer, businessman, writer, and sculptor

== See also ==
- Servino, surname
