= DeSimone =

DeSimone or De Simone is an Italian surname. Notable people with the surname include:

== DeSimone family ==
A group of related Italian American mobsters:

- Frank DeSimone, lawyer turned mobster
- Rosario DeSimone, early Los Angeles mobster
- Thomas DeSimone

== Other people: DeSimone ==
- Bob DeSimone (born 1946), American actor
- Herbert F. DeSimone (1929–2013), American lawyer and politician from Rhode Island
- James DeSimone (G.I. Joe)
- Joée, born Joey DeSimone
- Joseph DeSimone (inventor)
- Louis A. DeSimone (1922–2018), American Roman Catholic bishop
- Nick DeSimone (born 1994), American ice hockey player
- Paul DeSimone, American bodybuilder
- Robert Desimone, American neuroscientist
- Tom DeSimone (born 1939), American film director
- Vincent DeSimone (1918–1979), New Jersey detective

== De Simone ==
- Carlo De Simone (1885–1951), Italian army officer in World War II
- Carlo De Simone (linguist) (1932–2023), Italian linguist
- Domenico de Simone (1768–1837), Italian cardinal
- Domenico De Simone (1926–2019), Italian politician
- Fabrizio De Simone (born 1971), Italian racing driver
- Giorgio De Simone (1932–2024), Italian journalist and writer
- Giovanni Alfredo De Simone (1919–1985, known as Johnny Desmond), American singer
- Gustavo de Simone (born 1948), Uruguayan footballer
- Lenika de Simone (born 1985), Spanish gymnast
- Niccolò De Simone (died c. 1677), Flemish painter
- Roberto De Simone (1933–2025), Italian stage director, playwright, composer and ethnomusicologist
- Titti De Simone (born 1970), Italian politician
