= Shadow puppets (disambiguation) =

Shadow Puppets or Shadow Puppet can refer to:

- A synonym for shadow play
- Shadow Puppets, the 2002 novel by Orson Scott Card
- Shadow Puppets (film), 2007 horror film
- Spike: Shadow Puppets, a comic book based on the Buffy the Vampire Slayer and Angel television series
- "Shadow Puppets", 2020 television series episode of The Walking Dead: World Beyond
- The Shadow Puppet, a 2014 translation of Georges Simenon's novel L'Ombre chinoise
- "Shadow Puppetry", a song by Jay Chou from the 2011 album Wow!

== See also ==
- The Last Shadow Puppets, a British rock band
