= Everything Moves Alone =

2001 film

Everything Moves Alone is a 2001 independent comedy film produced by Connecticut filmmakers Mike Aransky, Phil Guerrette and Thomas Edward Seymour. Everything Moves Alone (shot in 1999 on 16mm) is a largely forgotten film from the 90's independent film movement. This film is a dramatic comedy is in the spirit of Slacker and Bottle Rocket. The film follows the journey of a suicidal ex-soldier named Scotch (Guerrette) who tracks down his estranged and hostile brother (Aransky) in a small New England town. In this new surrounding, Scotch becomes involved in a strange and comically violent feud between a wealthy but misanthropic local (Seymour) and the easily excitable owner of a video store (Matt Ford).

“Everything Moves Alone” was shot in 16mm on a $9,000 budget, with a six-person film crew. The film premiered at the Hartford, Connecticut art house theater Cinestudio in the spring of 2001 and went on to play in the New York Independent International Film & Video Festival. It had a theatrical premiere in New York in August 2001, where it received mixed reviews. The filmmakers won the Auteur of the Year Award at the 2001 Bare Bones International Film Festival, and Matt Ford's performance received a Best Supporting Actor nomination at the B-Movie Film Festival. The film was released on DVD in February 2007. Co-director Tom Seymour affectionately referred to this film and his two other features as the "Backyard Trilogy" consisting of the three films Everything Moves Alone, Land of College Prophets and London Betty. The three feature-length films all involve backyard thieves or superheroes that all dwell in suburban environments all shot within central Connecticut.
