= Revolver Entertainment =

Film distributor

- Type: Private
- Industry: Film
- Founded: 1997; 29 years ago in London, England
- Founder: Justin Marciano
- Defunct: April 22, 2013; 13 years ago (UK Branch Only)
- Headquarters: London, England
- Area served: United Kingdom; United States; Canada
- Key people: Justin Marciano (CEO); Seb Marciano (President)
- Services: Film distribution Home video

Revolver Entertainment is a film distributor in the United Kingdom, Canada and the United States. Justin Marciano founded it in 1997 in the UK and Revolver UK entered administration in April 2013. Justin's brother, Seb Marciano formed Revolver Entertainment LLC, a US company based in Los Angeles, California in 2007. Revolver US is still successfully operating independently of Revolver UK.

== History ==
Justin Marciano founded Revolver Entertainment in 1997 with a personal investment of £1,000. It originally distributed home video titles and eventually grew to cinema release film distribution.

In January 2013, Revolver Entertainment UK experienced layoffs. In April 2013, amid rumors that the UK company had gone out of business, it entered administration.

In 2013, Revolver US released Kenneth Branagh's adaptation of Mozart's The Magic Flute. In 2014, Revolver US released Bhopal: A Prayer for Rain in cinemas, which stars Kal Penn, Mischa Barton, and Martin Sheen. Also in 2014, Revolver US released Soulmate on VOD, which is produced by Neil Marshall

In 2015, Revolver US released An Act of War on VOD, DVD, and on Netflix. The film was directed by Ryan M. Kennedy and produced by Atit Shah.

== Releases ==
Revolver's Catalogue includes:

- 3000 Miles – (2007)
- The Mark of Cain – (2007)
- Mum & Dad – (2008)
- Star Wreck: In the Pirkinning – (2009)
- Tony – (2009)
- Robsessed – (2009)
- Waveriders – (2009)
- Sparkle – (2010)
- Destricted – (2010)
- Shooting Robert King – (2010)
- Shank – (2010)
- Bonded by Blood – (2010)
- Salvage – (2010)
- One Night in Turin – (2010)
- Titanic: 100 Years On – (2011)
- King George VI: The Man Behind the King's Speech – (2011)
- Prince William & Kate: The Royal Romance – (2011)
- Anuvahood – (2011)
- The Veteran – (2011)
- Starsuckers – (2012)
- Bloodstained Memoirs – (2012)
- Sket – (2012)
- The Magic Flute – (2012)
- Dragon Knight – (2013)
- Tomorrow Will Be Better – (2013)
- The Comedian – (2013)
- The Asylum Tapes – (2013)
- Offender – (2013)
- Mexican Fighter – (2013)
- Act of Grace – (2014)
- Aleksander – (2014)
- Aardvark – (2014)
- Lucky Bastard – (2014)
- The Addicted – (2014)
- Angry Nazi Zombies – (2014)
- About a Zombie – (2014)
- Project Wild Thing – (2014)
- The Inside – (2014)
- Soulmate – (2014)
- Bhopal: A Prayer for Rain – (2014)
- The Neighbors – (2015)
- House of Last Things – (2015)
- Original Gangster – (2014)
- Angels of Darkness – (2015)
- An Act of War - (2015)
- Fantail – (2015)
- American Interior – (2015)
