= New York Palace =

New York Palace may refer to:

- Lotte New York Palace Hotel, New York City
- Palace Theatre (New York City)
- New York Palace Hotel, Budapest

== See also ==
- Palace Theatre (Albany, New York)
- Palace Theatre (Syracuse, New York)
