= Servino =

Servino is an Italian surname. Notable people with the name include:

- Francesco Servino (born 1984), Italian journalist
- Jean-Luc Servino (born 1989), Italian director and writer

== See also ==
- Sorvino, surname
