= Maybe Tomorrow (film) =

- Theatrical Poster
- Directed by: Michael Wolfe
- Screenplay by: Michael Wolfe
- Produced by: Mark Eric Montgomery; Robert Nicotra
- Starring: Dominik Tiefenthaler; Michael Wolfe; Paul Lange; Christopher Shyer
- Cinematography: Gus Sacks
- Edited by: Todd Sandler
- Music by: Joshua Cipolla
- Release date: October 2012 (Golden Door Film Festival)
- Running time: 93 min.
- Country: United States
- Language: English

Maybe Tomorrow is a 2012 independent drama film. Written and directed by Michael Wolfe, the film is Mr. Wolfe's feature directorial debut. The film stars Dominik Tiefenthaler, Michael Wolfe, Paul Lange and Christopher Shyer.

== Plot ==
After fifteen years, three old friends are forced to revisit the one night that changed their lives forever.

In order to evade a lengthy prison sentence, Russ Mahler, a career criminal, blackmails his former friend and Manhattan District Attorney Graham Seifert. With his hands tied, Graham has Russ acquitted, and on insistence of his friend and Chief of Staff Evan Midland, the three men meet for a weekend at Graham's Hampton beach house to finally bury their memory of the night from fifteen years ago. All past grievances surface in an explosive night that alters the trajectories of all their lives.

== Cast ==
- Dominik Tiefenthaler as Graham Seifert
- Michael Wolfe as Russ Mahler
- Paul Lange as Evan Midland
- Christopher Shyer as Senator Monty Clemens
- Carolina Ravassa as Kiah Mendoza
- Caitlin Norton as Carrie Midland
- Kate Hobbs as Katherine Seifert

== Production ==
Michael Wolfe wrote the first draft of Maybe Tomorrow in 2008. After that, he and his producing partner Mark Montgomery spent nearly three years securing financing necessary to shoot the film. After two months of pre-production, production commenced in February 2011 and lasted eighteen days.

== Awards ==
Maybe Tomorrow won Best Feature at the 2012 Golden Door Film Festival. The festival also gave awards to Michael Wolfe for Best Director, Best Actor and Best Screenplay as well as an award for Best Supporting Actor to Dominik Tiefenthaler.

The film also received a Best Supporting Actor nomination for Michael Wolfe in the 2012 Hoboken International Film Festival and was the Runner Up for Best Feature in the 2012 Philadelphia Independent Film Festival.

Maybe Tomorrow received a nomination for Best Ensemble Cast in the 2012 Orlando Film Festival.

The film was also an Official Selection of the 2012 Bahamas International Film Festival, where it won the award for Best Feature in the New Divisions category. Maybe Tomorrow also screened at the 2012 Greenpoint Film Festival, the 2012 Big Apple Film Festival and the 2012 Hartford Flick Fest, where it won the award for Best Feature Flick.

== Reception ==
Film Threat called Maybe Tomorrow "...an incredibly powerful film." "...emotional and memorable." Misty Layne of Rogue Cinema hailed it as "...one film you don't want to miss." "...an intense character piece that piles on the drama." Charles Tatum of EFilmCritic.com wrote that "Maybe Tomorrow is one of those films that comes out of nowhere, packing an emotional punch and technical finesse that is sadly lacking in other smaller budgeted independent films."
