= Michael Wolfe (filmmaker) =

American actor and filmmaker

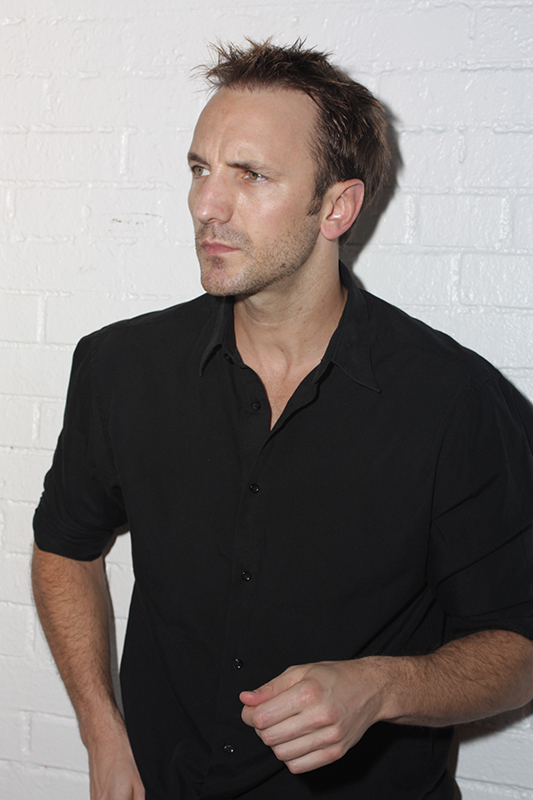
- Born: October 12, 1976 (age 49); Patchogue, New York, U.S.
- Occupations: Actor, writer, producer, director
- Years active: 2005–present

Michael Wolfe (born October 12, 1976) is an American actor, writer, producer and director, known for his work on the independent film Maybe Tomorrow.

== Early life ==
Michael Wolfe was born and raised in Patchogue, New York, and studied TV and film production at the Marist College. He worked for more than 10 years as a bartender in Rego Park before entering the film business.

== Career ==
For his portrayal of Russ Mahler in Maybe Tomorrow, Wolfe received the award for Best Actor in a Feature Film in the 2012 Golden Door Film Festival, and was nominated for Best Supporting Actor in the 2012 Hoboken International Film Festival. He was also nominated, along with his cast mates, for Best Ensemble Performance in the 2012 Orlando Film Festival.

Wolfe is a member of the Actors' Equity Association. His stage credits include the role of Mij in the dramatic play Banshee of Bainbridge that ran in the 2010 New York International Fringe Festival.

As a screenwriter, Wolfe is a member of the Writers Guild of America. He has written four pilots, 23 screenplays and two books.

For directing Maybe Tomorrow, Wolfe received the award for Best Director and shared the award for Best Film at the 2012 Golden Door International Film Festival, and was the runner-up for Best Feature in the 2012 Philadelphia Independent Film Festival. Maybe Tomorrow was showcased at the 2012 Hartford Flick Fest (Best Feature Flick). and the 2012 Bahamas International Film Festival, where it won the award for Best Feature in the New Divisions category.

=== Blogging ===
Wolfe is a contributing blogger and editor at large at Veracity Stew, which covers politics and pop culture in general.
