= London Betty =

- Directed by: Thomas Edward Seymour
- Written by: Thomas Edward Seymour
- Produced by: Mike Aransky; Robert Cosgrove Jr. Sheri Lynn
- Starring: Clint Howard; Daniel von Bargen; Thomas Edward Seymour; Russ Russo; Nicole Lewis
- Narrated by: Clint Howard
- Cinematography: Mike Anderson
- Production company: Hale Manor Productions
- Distributed by: Maverick Entertainment Group
- Release date: January 20, 2009
- Running time: 80 minutes
- Country: United States
- Language: English

London Betty is a 2009 American comedy/adventure film directed and written by Thomas Edward Seymour. The film includes performances by Nicole Lewis, Daniel von Bargen (in his final performance), Russ Russo, and director Seymour, as well as narration by Clint Howard. London Betty made the list of "Top Films of the Year" on Moviesmademe.com in 2009. Originally having a theatrical release in 2009, the film was released on DVD in 2010 through Maverick Entertainment on their Platinum Label. In May 2011 London Betty hit the #3 spot for British comedy on Amazon on Demand. The film was nationally distributed at Blockbuster Video until the company went out of business in 2013. Director Tom Seymour affectionately referred to this film and his two other features as the "Backyard Trilogy" consisting of Everything Moves Alone, Land of College Prophets and London Betty. The three films all involve backyard thieves or in the case of Land of College Prophets superheroes that all dwell in suburban environments all shot within central Connecticut.

== Plot ==
London Betty (Nicole Lewis) is the plucky British journalist who gets a newspaper job in the small American town of Pharisee. But trying to get an audience with her elusive, agoraphobic publisher Maury (Daniel von Bargen) is only part of her problem. Her first story requires the toppling of the corrupt and perverted administration run by Mayor Plumb (Dick Boland) and his band of off-kilter hoodlums. However, Betty has unlikely allies to help her bring down the mayor: a pair of petty thieves, Volga (Russ Russo) and Billy (Thomas Edward Seymour), a golden-hearted prostitute Jess (Margaret Rose Champagne) and a transvestite ex-Marine hitman, Sgt. Stone (Phil Hall).

== Partial cast ==
- Clint Howard as Narrator (voice)
- Daniel von Bargen as Maury
- Thomas Edward Seymour as Billy
- Russ Russo as Volgo
- Phil Hall as Sgt. Stone
- Matt Ford as Roy McCoy
- Nicole Lewis as London Betty
- Margaret Rose Champagne as Jess
- Dick Boland as Mayor Plumb
- Philip Guerette as Todd
- Sheri Lynn as Cindy
- Rachael Robbins as Mindy
- Chris Ferry as Karate Stan
- Jonathan Gorman as Stanley

== Reception ==
Felix Vasquez Jr. of Cinema Crazed wrote in his review: "'London Betty' has a hard time deciding on a tone, story, and genre. Dennis Schwartz of Dennis Schwartz Movie Reviews wrote in his review: "An amateur production that has its heart in the right place."

== Awards and recognition ==
- Won Best Connecticut film at the Silk City Film Festival
- Won Best Feature Film at the Accolade Film Festival 2008
- Won the Underground Spirit Award at the New Haven Underground Film Festival
- Best Actress nomination Nicole Lewis: Hoboken International Film Festival 2009
- Best Dramedy Nomination: Bare Bones International Film Festival 2009
- Honoree: Director's Showcase, New York B-Movie Film Festival 2008
- Official Selection: Audience Choice Awards 2009
- Official Selection: Connecticut Film Festival 2009

== Release ==
London Betty became available on DVD February 2, 2010 in the United States.
