= Art House Productions =

American arts organization

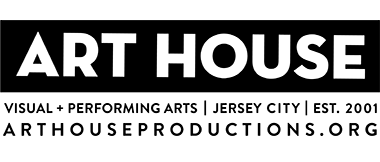

Art House Productions is a not-for-profit arts organization located in Jersey City, New Jersey. Art House Productions is best known for organizing and coordinating JC Fridays, a variation on a First Fridays citywide art and culture event, held quarterly since 2006. Art House also produces Your Move Modern Dance Festival, an annual performance festival featuring the art of modern dance at the historic Loew's Jersey Theater, and Art House TV, a weekly public-access television show on the air since 2003, in addition to hosting acting classes and workshops for teenagers and adults.

Art House was founded by Christine Goodman, current director for the Office of Cultural Affairs for the city of Jersey City, in 2001. Following the September 11, 2001 attack on the World Trade Center Twin Towers in New York City, Goodman reportedly wanted to create a community open mic night for Jersey City artists, living directly across the Hudson River from Lower Manhattan, to be able to reflect on the events of the attack. In 2017, Goodman stepped down and was succeeded by Meredith Burns. Art House Productions offers arts and culture programming, visual and performing arts exhibitions, festivals, theater productions, and during the pandemic Virtual Drag Bingo.

In 2018, Art House established the 6th Borough Comedy Festival, a stand-up, sketch and improv festival featuring local and national comedians, with Gilbert Gottfried headlining in 2018. In 2019, the festival featured a roast of Jersey City Mayor Steven Fulop. In 2020, the festival was renamed the Jersey City Comedy Festival.

The first Art House Productions offices, theater, and gallery space was located in the Jersey City neighborhood of Hamilton Park. In 2014, the organization relocated its headquarters to Journal Square, and moved again in 2017 to the Cast Iron Lofts building in the Soho West district.

In 2021, Art House Productions merged with Jersey Art Exchange (JAX), a nonprofit providing arts and media education programs for Jersey City youth.

In 2023, Art House will move to a new, permanent home at 345 Marin Boulevard inJersey City, steps from the Grove Street PATH.

In 2023, it was a sponsor of the Golden Door Film Festival.
