= Michael Legge (filmmaker) =

American actor and filmmaker

- Born: June 12, 1953 (age 72); Massachusetts, United States
- Occupations: Actor, Filmmaker

Michael Legge (born June 12, 1953) is a Massachusetts-born American B-movie filmmaker and actor. He is known for producing low-budget comedy-horror films that he writes, directs and generally stars in. He founded the production company Sideshow Cinema.

== Early life ==
According to Legge, he enjoyed watching the comedies of The Marx Brothers and Laurel and Hardy and was also a big fan of horror movies that were so prevalent in the 1950s/1960s. He started making movies at a young age with an 8mm movie camera and by high school was making spoofs of movies such as David Lean's Bridge on the River Kwai. Legge was writing and acting in these films, as well as shooting and editing them, with help from friends and family members.

== Acting career ==
Legge has won several awards as an actor, including a B-Movie Award at the B-Movie Film Festival for being the Best Villain in 1999 in his film Braindrainer. He has acted on the stage as well as on screen. In 2000, he played Dr. Wahl in The Girls from H.A.R.M.!, a film directed by Pat Bishow.

== Filmmaking career ==
Michael Legge's filmmaking career developed out of his love of the movies and of his own skill at making short comedies and off-the-wall films. His early movies were all shot on film. From 1970 to 1986 he made dozens of films. He continued to produce and develop films through his production company Sideshow Cinema. With his success on the festival circuit, an independent film distributor signed him up and released many of his short and feature films on video. Currently, Sub Rosa is releasing all his films.

Honey Glaze (2003) was Legge's biggest-budget film ever, and it had a successful Sub Rosa release. His comedy film Democrazy, released January 25, 2005, stars himself, Lorna Nogueira, John Shanahan, and Stacy Armstrong.

== Recent films ==
- Squirrels (1987), writer, producer, director, and actor
- Chat for Mrs. Order (1987), writer, producer, director, and actor
- Working Stiffs (1989), writer, producer, director, and actor
- Loons (1991), writer, producer, director, and actor
- Cutthroats (1994), writer, producer, director, and actor
- Sick Time (1995), writer, producer, director, and actor
- Potential Sins (1997), writer, producer, director, and actor
- Alien Agenda: Under the Skin (1996–1997), wrote and directed an "Alien Abductee Interviews" segment
- Stumped (1998), writer, producer, director, and actor
- Creaturerealm: Demons Wake (1998), wrote and directed "Dryer Straits" segment
- Braindrainer (1999), writer, producer, director, and actor
- The Girls from H.A.R.M! (2000), actor
- Honey Glaze (2003), writer, producer, director, and actor
- That's Independent! (2004), interviewee
- Democrazy (2005), writer, producer, director, and actor
- Dungeon of Dr. Dreck (2007), writer, producer, and actor
- My Mouth Lies Screaming (2009), writer, producer and actor
- Evan Straw (2010) writer, producer and actor
- Coffee Run (2011) writer, producer and actor
