= Catch Hell =

2014 film by Ryan Phillippe

- Directed by: Ryan Phillippe
- Written by: Ryan Phillippe; Joe Gassett
- Produced by: Ryan Phillippe; Robert Ogden Barnum; Holly Wiersma
- Starring: Ryan Phillippe; Tig Notaro
- Cinematography: Steve Gainer
- Edited by: Matt Landon
- Music by: The Newton Brothers
- Production companies: Twisted Pictures; IM Global
- Distributed by: Entertainment One
- Release date: October 10, 2014
- Running time: 98 minutes
- Country: United States
- Language: English

Catch Hell (also known as Chained or as Kidnapped) is a 2014 American thriller film written and directed by Ryan Phillippe.

== Plot ==
Washed-up Hollywood actor Reagan Pierce arrives in Louisiana for the filming of a movie titled Flashpoint. He meets with the director at a hotel lobby, despite being interrupted by fans for photos; he is strangely wary of the director. Later, while at a gym, he is stared at in an unsettling way by strangers. Feeling nervous, he expresses a desire to quit the film, but relents after his boss pressures him.

The next morning, a van arrives as Reagan leaves his hotel. He gets in, assuming it is his driver with other cast and crew. Reagan forgets which number to call to check on the rehearsal, so he asks the passengers. Junior, the front passenger, offers to dial the number for him, so Reagan hands him his cell phone; he does not give it back, ignoring Reagan. The van stops in-front of a rural shack. The driver, Mike, pulls Reagan out of the van and immediately attacks him, beating him until he blacks-out.

Reagan wakes up inside, chained to the wall. The men dumped his belongings. Reagan, still believing he has some Hollywood notoriety, tries to offer Mike $1M as a ransom. Mike says money is not the point. As he slowly slices Reagan's face with a knife, he says his wife is Diana—who actually worked in wardrobe on one of his movies—to which Reagan says he does not know of her. Mike threatens to "maim" him with bolt cutters if he does not come-clean, but Junior reminds him that they wanted Reagan alive for a while; Mike then breaks Reagan's hand before knocking him out again.

Reagan awakens with his hand bandaged. Junior, upset, says they thought he was dead. He gives Reagan an oxycontin for pain. Mike returns and tries to get Reagan to remember Diana, which he says he does not, and that he would never sleep with another man's wife. Mike asks for his phone PIN and views supposed texts from Diana. Junior also finds nudes of Reagan's actress ex-girlfriend on his phone, plus a nude of Reagan. Mike gets into Reagan's laptop with the PIN.

The next morning, Mike says that he sent the nudes to the media, and announces it is "time to feed the gators". He goes into a room with a hole in the floor and defecates into the swamp water below. He posts a cryptic message via Reagan's Twitter. Mike says that he wants to destroy Reagan's reputation before killing him, and tells Reagan to re-record his phone voicemail message. Reagan reads it and tells him, "It's weak, no one talks that way". He records a ranting, cryptic message asking everyone not to call him. The media reports that he is going crazy.

Mike thanks him for the message and says he was a disgraced cop, fired for domestic abuse. He asks Reagan again how he met up with his wife. Reagan says he drove her home from work once and listened to her vent about Mike's abuse, before they had sex. He tells Mike that she said her husband could never give her an orgasm. Mike proceeds to tase Reagan. Junior arrives, and Mike leaves. Junior finds Reagan bloodied, with a tooth missing. Junior puts the tooth into his pocket.

Reagan wakes up to an alligator resting by his face. Junior, on top of the gator, says he saved Reagan's life after the gator entered the shack. Junior shoots and skins the gator, and reports to Mike that Reagan's still alive. Reagan asks to piss. Junior unhooks him from the wall, leaving his hands tied, and takes him to the floor in the hole. Reagan considers jumping in, but he does not. He suggests to Junior that Mike might turn on Junior and kill him, as he is the only witness.

The next day, Junior grills alligator meat and takes Reagan outside, chained, for some sun. He does some chin-ups while looking at Reagan, then masturbates in the shack. Mike says he is at work, establishing his alibi, and should return around 1:30 am. Junior asks about his own alibi. Mike says he does not need one. Mike visits Diana, now his ex-wife, and claims he is not a violent man anymore. She says she will think about letting him see the kids.

Junior tells Reagan that he loves his movies and that Reagan should take care of himself to look younger. Reagan compliments Junior, who is flattered. In the news, the media questions Reagan's tweet and broadcasts surveillance video of him getting into Mike's van. The voicemail message he recorded is actually a verbatim quote from a movie in which he played a kidnapped soldier. The police begin to look for him.

Junior gives Reagan alligator stew and compliments him. Reagan flirts back. While Junior is not looking, Reagan moves part of his chain under his leg. Junior asks if he has experience with a dude. Reagan says if he is drunk enough, he is down for anything. Junior gives him whiskey and starts kissing his neck. Reagan freaks out. Junior is upset, but says it is all right because he roofied the gator stew and just has to wait. Hearing this, Reagan pretends to pass-out. Junior is about to rape him when the phone rings. Reagan quickly head-butts Junior and strangles him with the chain before ultimately passing-out.

Mike sees that the cops are looking for him. He panics and drives over to Junior's mom's home, looking for him. Reagan wakes up to an alligator eating and carrying away Junior. Reagan suddenly breaks free and escapes. He finds a random car, with keys, but it does not start. With ongoing rain, Mike arrives by boat, as the roads have flooded. He sees Junior's body at the edge of the water, and searches the shack before seeing Reagan. Reagan incapacitates him with a spear gun, then beats him to death.

Later, in an interview, Reagan says that after the kidnappers died, he had to wait until morning for rescue, as there were rogue alligators. Reagan returns home and receives a call from his manager, who says that his interview received amazing views and that everybody wants him in their movies.

That night, Reagan looks at his emails and sees one from Junior, sent prior to his death. In it, Junior expresses his feelings for Reagan and apologizes for the way they met, reminding him that there was some good in it; attached is a video Junior took, showing Reagan restrained and Junior dancing, with the dead alligator skin on his back. Junior and Reagan are both laughing in the video.

== Cast ==
- Ryan Phillippe as Reagan Pearce
- Ian Barford as Mike
- Stephen Louis Grush as Reginald "Junior" Hester Jr.
- Tig Notaro as Careen Hester
- Russ Russo as Tim Remmit
- James DuMont as Tony Cunningham
- Joyful Drake as Diane
- Ray Wood as Butch
- Carol Sutton as Delores
- Heidi Brook Myers as Rhonda
- Jillian Barberie as herself
- Michael Boyne as Howard Kyle (uncredited)
- Forrest Forte as David (uncredited)

== Development ==
The film was first announced in 2012, as Ryan Phillippe's directional debut under the title Shreveport. It was financed by producer Mark Burg through his Twisted Pictures label, and it was filmed in Louisiana.

The new title Catch Hell was confirmed on July 17, 2014. It was distributed by Entertainment One Films. The trailer was released on July 31, 2014.

== Reception ==
On review aggregator Rotten Tomatoes, the film holds an approval rating of 0% based on 6 reviews, with an average rating of 3.81/10. On Metacritic, the film has a weighted average score of 40 out of 100, based on 6 critics, indicating "mixed or average" reviews.

Movie Nation called it "nothing more than the sort of exploitation film that Reagan Pearce has signed onto, in desperation, one that he and we realize will be no game changer for the movie star on screen or the one behind the camera." Slant Magazine awarded it one out of five stars, saying "Phillippe never digs into Pearce as a person, or ponders the solitary nature of the actor's lifestyle, and the effect, which lasts right up until the inevitable and self-serving conclusion in which Pearce's career is resuscitated in the wake of all the media coverage surrounding his disappearance, is that he's kept at a distance from the audience" The New York Times said "But a certain curiosity value arises out of Mr. Phillippe's coincidental occupation here as a professional actor and a director." We Got This Covered said, "I'm not saying I'll ever know what it feels like to be scrutinized by every gossipy website and television show, but Catch Hell is a failed attempt to help audiences understand the trials and tribulations of actors forced into an obsessive limelight." The Village Voice was more positive, saying "Catch Hell might not catapult Phillippe back into the spotlight, but as Junior, Grush is by turns ashamed, bashful, and dangerous; he could perhaps do more if given the chance."
