= Tai (elephant) =

Asian elephant

- Species: Asian elephant
- Sex: Female
- Born: November 4, 1968; Thailand
- Died: May 17, 2021 (aged 52); Fredericksburg, Texas, U.S.
- Known for: The films Operation Dumbo Drop, Larger than Life, George of the Jungle and Water for Elephants.
- Weight: 3,600 kg (7,900 lb) (1995); 4,200 kg (9,300 lb) (2011)
- Height: 269 cm (8 ft 10 in)
- Official site (Archived)

Tai (November 4, 1968 – May 7, 2021) was an Asian elephant. She was best known for portraying Bo Tat in the film Operation Dumbo Drop (1995), Vera in Larger than Life (1996), and Rosie in Water for Elephants (2011). Her name was derived from her country of birth, Thailand. Tai was captured in the wild and placed into captivity.

== Career ==
Tai had an uncredited film appearance as a circus elephant in Big Top Pee-wee (1988) and a minor role in The Jungle Book (1994), in which she scares off some poachers. She followed this by playing the major role of Bo Tat in Operation Dumbo Drop in 1995. The American Humane Association rated the treatment of animals in the film as acceptable. In the scene in which Tai is sedated she is actually just obeying her trainer's instructions to lie down. The sounds of her snoring in the film are not actually coming from Tai, but were dubbed in during post-production. All scenes that show Tai in danger were carefully staged, and the boat in which she travels in the film was pre-tested to make sure it would support her 8,000 pounds (3,600 kg) weight. To ensure she remained healthy, all of Tai's food, drinking water, and even her bathing water, was shipped from the U.S. to Thailand, where filming was taking place.

Tai portrayed the major role of Vera in the 1996 comedy Larger than Life alongside Bill Murray, and had a minor role in George of the Jungle in 1997, where she can be seen being ridden by Brendan Fraser and Leslie Mann, and again with Fraser himself through Tweety Bird's jungle in Looney Tunes: Back in Action in 2003.

Tai's performance in Water for Elephants in 2011 was praised. It was the second time Tai, Reese Witherspoon and Robert Pattinson had all worked on the same film, as all three had been filmed in Vanity Fair in 2004, though Pattinson's part was edited out of the final cut.

One of Tai's paintings as well as an autographed poster for Water for Elephants was auctioned off on eBay to raise awareness of elephant endotheliotropic herpesvirus. The money Tai raised from the auction was given to the International Elephant Foundation (IEF) which distributed it to the appropriate labs and research facilities actively working to find a cure for EEHV.

== Death ==
She was owned by Gary and Kari Johnson of Have Trunk Will Travel, Inc., a privately funded organization that generates income through elephant rides, shows and events, as well as film and commercial appearances. In 2020, Have Trunk Will Travel was rebranded as The Preserve.

Tai died in May 2021, aged 53, at The Preserve facility in Fredericksburg, Texas.

The Preserve sent out an email on May 7 to their subscribers saying she had died after "a brief illness"; a spokesperson from the group later said she had died from kidney failure. She was the second elephant to die at The Preserve that year, reigniting allegations of animal cruelty at the facility.

== Controversy ==
Tai's appearances in film were frequently condemned by animal rights organizations People for the Ethical Treatment of Animals (PETA), though representatives from the American Humane Association (AHA) frequently stated Tai was treated well on set. Such claims and defense were made for Tai's appearance in Britney Spears' 2008 music video Circus, the 2009 film Exit Through the Gift Shop (during which Tai was covered in paint), the 2011 film Water for Elephants and the television series Westworld in 2018.

Protests were also lodged regarding the 2011 film Zookeeper which Tai was reported to be featured in. However the film's director, Frank Coraci, denied using any elephants from Have Trunk Will Travel in filming. The elephant used in the film was Tai's Have Trunk Will Travel herd mate, Rosie.

Following Tai's appearances in Water for Elephants, controversy erupted regarding concerns she was mistreated prior to filming. A video released by the Animal Defenders International (ADI) in 2011 shows footage of Tai allegedly being shocked with handheld stun guns and beaten around the body and legs with bull hooks, while in the care of Have Trunk Will Travel in 2005. The ADI contacted AHA, urging them to re-evaluate how they assess the use of animals in films and the statements being made which effectively endorse the use of performing animals.

Have Trunk Will Travel responded to the video stating, "The video shows heavily edited and very short snippets, obviously taken surreptitiously six years ago, purporting mistreatment of our elephants. If there was truly any abuse going on why wait six minutes, much less six years?" In 2018, Have Trunk Will Travel relocated their business from California to Texas after California introduced a law banning the use of bull hooks in training animals.

== Filmography ==
- Quest for Fire (1981) - Woolly mammoth (uncredited)
- Big Top Pee-wee (1988)
- The Giant of Thunder Mountain (1991) - Circus elephant (uncredited)
- Rudyard Kipling's The Jungle Book (1994)
- Operation Dumbo Drop (1995) - Bo Tat
- Larger than Life (1996) - Vera
- Gulliver's Travels (1996) - Surus
- George of the Jungle (1997) - Shep
- Meet the Deedles (1998) - Circus elephant (uncredited)
- The Scorpion King (2002)
- George of the Jungle 2 (2003) - Shep
- Looney Tunes: Back in Action (2003)
- Vanity Fair (2004)
- Circus (2008)
- Exit Through the Gift Shop (2009)
- Water for Elephants (2011) - Rosie
- Westworld (2018)
- Saving Flora (2018) - Flora

== See also ==
- List of individual elephants
