= Land of College Prophets =

The Land of College Prophets
- Directed by: Mike Aransky
- Starring: Thomas Edward Seymour; Phil Guerrette; Russ Russo; Paul DeSimone
- Release date: 2005
- Running time: 83 minutes
- Language: English

Land of College Prophets is a 2005 independent comedy film produced by Thomas Edward Seymour, Mike Aransky and Phil Guerette. Originally distributed on Netflix in 2005, Prophets was one of the first of the "backyard superhero" subgenres of films, pre-dating James Gunn's Super, Defendor, Special, Kick Ass and so on. The film involves low-level superheroes at a community college that awaken a haunted wishing well. The film mixes comedy with science fiction in a tale of two brawling college students (Guerrette and Seymour) who accidentally reactivate a dormant well that spews toxic liquids into the surrounding community, resulting in abrupt and deadly changes within nature and people. The film was available on Netflix, Hollywood Video and Movie Gallery in 2005.

The Land of College Prophets was shot in digital video on locations across Connecticut in 2003. The film premiered in New York in 2005, and later won five awards at the 2005 B-Movie Film Festival, including Best Picture. It also won the Best Picture Award at the 2005 New Haven Underground Film Festival and the Best Ensemble Award from Bare Bones International Film Festival. Reviews were generally positive, with Rick Curnutte of The Film Journal proclaiming that it “could easily become the first genuine cult hit of the DV era.” In 2018 the B-Movie Mania Show rediscovered a DVD version of the film at a Dollar Tree store for 99 cents and built an entire show around the film, praising it as a hidden B-movie gem from the early digital era of American film. Co-director Tom Seymour affectionately referred to this film and his two other features as the "Backyard Trilogy" consisting of the three films Everything Moves Alone, Land of College Prophets and London Betty. The three feature-length films all involve backyard thieves or, in this case, superheroes that all dwell in suburban environments, all shot within central Connecticut.

The film was released on DVD in 2005 by York Entertainment.
