= Golden Door Film Festival =

Film festival in Jersey City, New Jersey

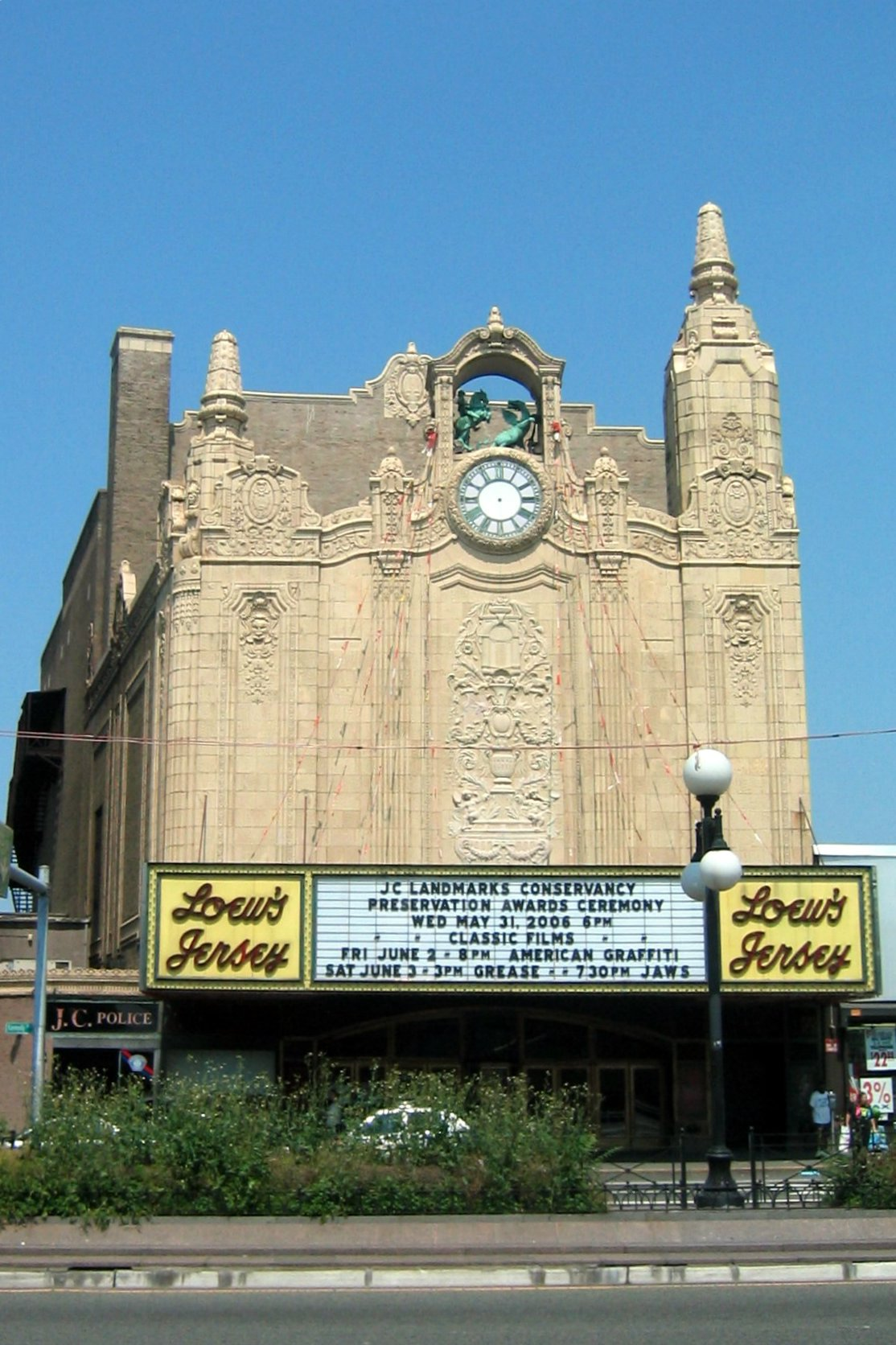
Loew's Jersey Theatre

The Golden Door Film Festival is a film festival in Jersey City, New Jersey, United States, which was inaugurated in 2011. The four-day festival shows features, documentaries, and shorts. The opening and closing night awards ceremony are located at the 1929 movie palace Loew's Jersey Theatre at Journal Square with many screenings and other events at various Downtown venues. The festival was founded by actor, producer, and musician Bill Sorvino. There are competitive awards for features, shorts, documentaries, student works, LBGT-themed films and the Women in Cinema-Alice Guy-Blaché Award for female directors.

== America's Golden Door ==
The Statue of Liberty National Monument, comprising Liberty Island and Ellis Island, is located in the Upper New York Bay opposite Liberty State Park in Jersey City. "I lift my lamp beside the golden door!" is the last line of "The New Colossus," the poem by Emma Lazarus. Many immigrants passed through the city's Communipaw Terminal and it is sometimes referred to as "America's Golden Door". The festival's name is inspired by the immigrant experience.

== 2011 ==
The first festival took place on October 14 to 17, 2011. 43 films were shown and there were 18 categories for competition. Lifetime achievement awards were given to Academy Award winner Leon Gast and Paul Sorvino. Night Club (2011) by director Sam Borowski won awards for Best Feature, Best Director of a Feature, Best Male Lead in a Feature (Ernest Borgnine), Best Female Lead in a Feature (Natasha Lyonne), and Best Acting by a Supporting Actor/Actress (Sally Kellerman). Life! Camera Action... and Another Day Another Life also picked up several nominations.

== 2012 ==
Fiftythree films were screened during the 2012 festival held on October 11 through 14, 2012. Two new categories for competition were added: the Student Filmmaker Award and the Women in Film-Alice Guy Blache Award, named for Alice Guy-Blaché, the narrative film director whose studio was located in Fort Lee, the birthplace of America's first motion picture industry at the beginning of the 20th century. Guy-Blaché is also considered a pioneer in the business.

Michael Wolfe's Maybe Tomorrow won several awards including Best Director, Best Actor and Best Screenplay. Best Supporting Actor went to Dominik Tiefenthaler.

== 2013 ==
The 2013 festival opened on October 10 with the documentary Fall to Grace about former New Jersey Governor Jim McGreevey. Armand Assante was given a lifetime achievement award. Sorvino announced that he would be working with Saint Peter's University to develop a film institute.

== 2014 ==
The 2014 festival was held on September 16 through 21 throughout Jersey City, with its opening night and awards ceremony at the Landmark Loew's Jersey Theatre. Autism awareness was now one of the philanthropic missions of the festival. Tommy Hilfiger, on the board of Autism Speaks, became a sponsor of the festival in 2014, and kicked off the event.

The two opening films were Six Letter Word, a short about autism, and The Odd Way Home. 92 films were shown during the festival. Best fFlm this year was African Gothic, which also won Best Screenplay (Damon Shalit), Best Director (Gabriel Bologna), Best Actress (Chella Ferrow), Best Cinematography (Massimo Zeri), and Best Editor (Pavel Savchuk). Garry Pastore's Destressed best documentary.

== 2015 ==
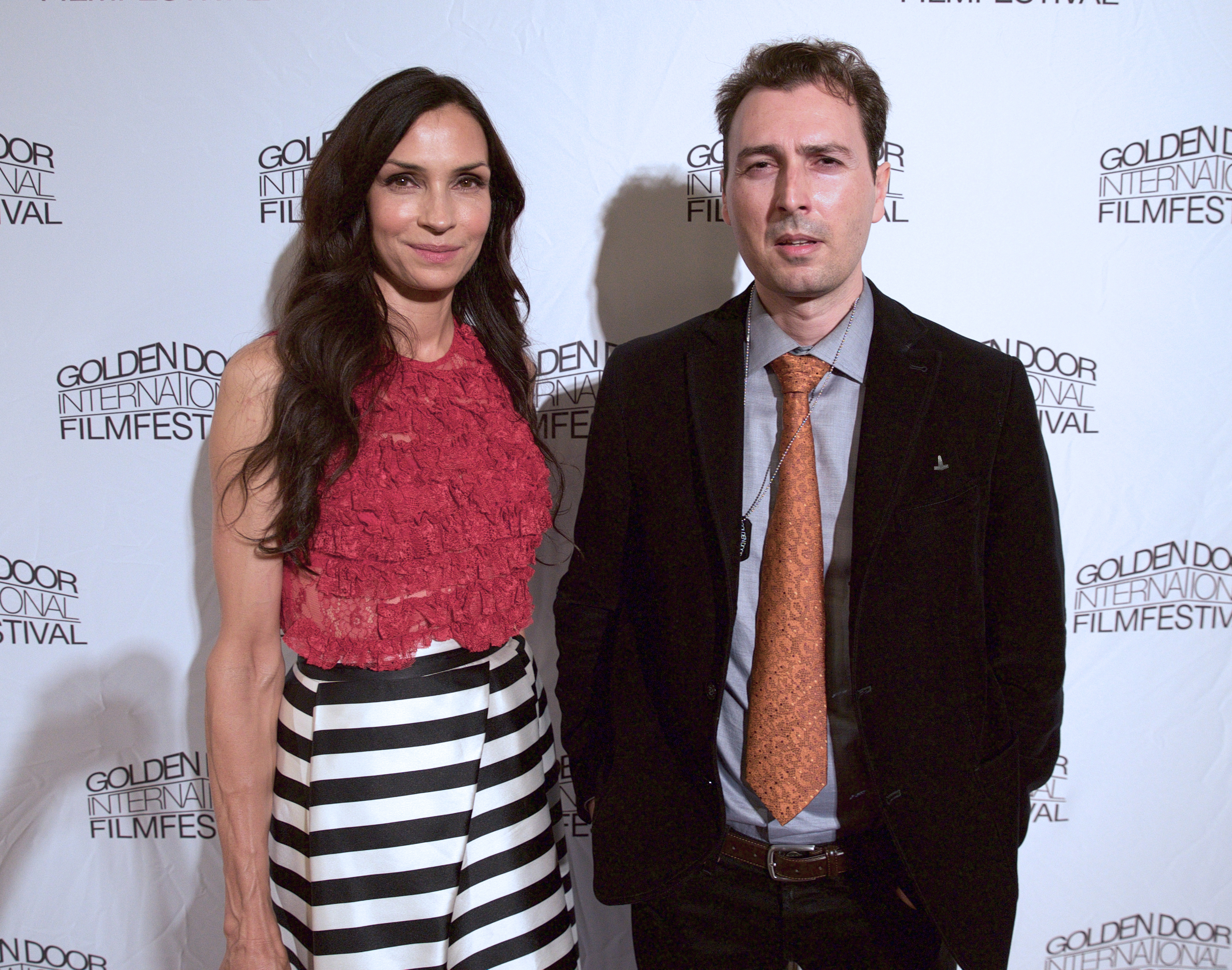
Actress Famke Janssen and director Artur Balder at the 2015 festival

The festival took place from September 24 to 27. Brute Force, a Jersey City native, performed with Daughter of Force at Brightside Tavern after a showing of a documentary about his life and work. Many events took place at New Jersey City University.

The organisation screened JR's Ellis in November.

== 2016 ==
The festival ran from September 22 to 25. It hosted the world premiere of Chris Robert's Another You, and screenings of Miles Doleac's The Hollow, Mara Lesemann's Detours, John Asher's Po, and Thomas Baldinger's Who's Jenna..?, starring festival founder Bill Sorvino.

== 2017 ==
More than 175 films were screened over four days at the seventh annual festival, which took place on October 5–8. The Girl Who Invented Kissing won four awards: Best Feature Film, Best Director (Tom Sierchio), Best Actor (Dash Mihok), and Best Supporting Actor (Vincent Piazza). Brooklyn in July received three awards in the short film category: Best Feature, Best Director (Bob Celli), and Best Actor (Thaddeus Daniels). Lonely Souls of Microbes received the Best International Short Film award.

== 2018 ==
The festival took place from September 20 to 23, 2018. 265 films were screened at different venues: Pope Lecture Hall and the Roy Irving Theater at Saint Peter's University, Communipaw Terminal in Liberty State Park, the Beacon Paramount Theater, Jersey City Theater Center's Merseles Studio, and White Eagle Hall.

== 2019 ==
The festival ran from September 17 to 22, 2019. It included the New Jersey premiere of Cupid’s First Day and the world premiere of Last Rehearsal of the Dangerous Kitten, by Bayonne-based Narrow Bridge. Best Local Film was Like Us. The Best Music Video Winner was Jahan Nostra for his video Embrace The Rain.

== 2020/21 ==
The festival was scheduled to take place from September 19 to 26, 2020, but was postponed to 2021 due to the COVID-19 pandemic. Tango Shalom won best feature film.

== 2022 ==
The festival took place in May 11-14. Scrap, by Vivian Kerr won best feature and best director. Anthony Rapp won bet actor in a short.

== 2023 ==
The 12th season ran June 22-24, 2023. Seventy-two films were screened at two venues: Art House Productions and Nimbus Arts Center. The nearby Canopy Hotel was the filmmakers hub.

== 2024 ==
The 13th annual GDIFF took place June 22-24, 2024.

== 2025 ==
The 14th annual GDIFF took place June 26-28, 2025.

== See also ==
- List of film festivals in New Jersey
- Television and film in New Jersey
- New Jersey Motion Picture and Television Commission
