= Larger than Life (film) =

1996 film

Larger Than Life
- Theatrical release poster
- Directed by: Howard Franklin
- Written by: Pen Densham; Garry Williams; Roy Blount Jr.
- Produced by: Pen Densham; Richard Barton Lewis; John Watson
- Starring: Bill Murray; Janeane Garofalo; Pat Hingle
- Cinematography: Elliot Davis
- Edited by: Sidney Levin
- Music by: Miles Goodman
- Production companies: United Artists; Trilogy Entertainment Group; Majestic Films
- Distributed by: MGM/UA Distribution Co. (North America); Majestic Films (International)
- Release date: November 1, 1996
- Running time: 93 minutes
- Country: United States
- Language: English
- Budget: $30 million
- Box office: $8.3 million

Larger Than Life is a 1996 American road comedy film starring Bill Murray, and directed by Howard Franklin. It was produced and co-written by Pen Densham. The film was financially and critically unsuccessful.

== Plot ==
The film opens at a convention of recliner salesmen, where Jack Corcoran gives a motivational speech based on his book Get Over It. Jack shares the example of his father dying before he was born as a difficult circumstance that must be overcome to succeed. At Jack's engagement party, his agent Walter updates him on all of his upcoming speaking engagements, and the pair hope that one of the engagements is high profile enough to lead to an infomercial.

As the party winds down, Jack reads telegrams from well wishers. One of the telegrams is from an attorney in Baltimore about the large estate of his recently deceased father Kirby. Jack's mother shortly admits that she lied about his father dying when he was born. In truth, she left him because she felt he would be a bad example for Jack.

The attorney in Baltimore shows Jack a contract which mentions $35,000. Thinking this is the size of his father's estate, Jack signs the contract. In fact, it is the amount of property damage that the attorney has suffered because of Vera, Kirby's elephant. Vera and Kirby were a traveling circus act, and she is a highly trained elephant. Kirby left a note for Jack that instructed him to call "Blockhead" in Kansas City if there are any problems with Vera. Jack contacts Mo at the San Diego Zoo, who happens to be transporting a herd of elephants to Sri Lanka in a few days. She helps Jack ascertain that Vera is a breeding age female, and she agrees to pay $30,000 for the elephant.

Jack and Vera board a train bound for San Diego, but the conductor insists on a bribe. Jack's $600 only gets them as far as Kansas City, where he looks up Blockhead, who is an old circus buddy of Kirby's. Blockhead shows Jack the extent of Vera's training, including a photo of Vera standing on her hind legs, which was a trick that she would only do for Kirby. He puts Jack onto an animal trainer in Los Angeles named Terry Bonura who works in show business. Terry offers Jack $40,000 for Vera. So, he and Blockhead attempt to drive to Los Angeles, but his truck breaks down. Jack rents a semi-truck and continues on his own. With no experience driving a big rig, Jack blows out the transmission.

Stuck at a truck stop, he encounters Tip Tucker who is a fast-talking, deeply paranoid trucker bound for Los Angeles. Jack slips outside to call Tip's mobile phone, and he tricks Tip into thinking his load has been canceled. Tip agrees to take Jack and Vera to Los Angeles instead. Along the way, Tip makes a phone call and realizes he has been tricked by Jack. He attacks Jack with a tire iron, but Vera intervenes and saves Jack from a beating. Tip drives off threatening to come back with the police.

Jack and Vera walk into New Mexico to evade Tip. They stumble into a monsoon that is threatening to tear apart a village church. As the villagers struggle to hold the walls up, Vera intervenes, holding the wall up with her head. The wall still threatens to collapse, and Jack gets her to stand on her hind legs to brace the wall for good. The villagers help Jack and Vera board a train that will finally take them to Los Angeles.

As he is about to sign the contract to sell Vera to Terry, Jack realizes that she subjects her animals to a grueling workload, and he witnesses one of Terry's trainers abusing another elephant with an electric goad. He steals one of Terry's trucks and drives to San Diego. Tip found Terry's business card in the cab of his truck, and he arrives just as Jack leaves.

At the San Diego airport, Mo is loading her elephants onto a C-5 Galaxy cargo plane. The tarmac security guard will not let Jack and Vera in because they are not on the manifest. Jack pulls the truck into the passenger drop-off in front of the airport and races through the terminal with Vera. At gate security, Tip finally catches up to them, waving Terry's electric goad. Jack convinces the security guards that Tip is more of a threat than Vera, and they deal with Tip while Jack and Vera catch up to Mo on the tarmac.

Mo explains that she has spent her entire budget and has no money for Vera. Jack confesses to Mo that he will miss Vera, but he knows she would be better off with other elephants. The film ends with a series of captions that indicate Jack left his fiancee for Mo, and the couple witnessed the birth of Vera's first calf in Sri Lanka together. Jack's ex-fiancee married his agent and Jack's mother ran their life. Tip Tucker also managed to get away and is still roaming the roads of America. The captions conclude by saying that Get Over It never made it to a 2nd printing, but Jack's memoir of his cross-country trip with Vera was a runaway bestseller.

== Cast ==
- Bill Murray as Jack Corcoran
- Janeane Garofalo as Mo
- Matthew McConaughey as Tip Tucker
- Keith David as Hurst
- Pat Hingle as Vernon
- Jeremy Piven as Walter
- Lois Smith as Luluna
- Anita Gillette as Vera Corcoran
- Maureen Mueller as Celeste
- Harve Presnell as Trowbridge Bowers
- Tracey Walter as Wee St. Francis
- Linda Fiorentino as Terry Bonura
- Tony Funderburg as Charlie
- Tai as Vera

== Production ==
Parts of the film were shot in Professor Valley and Green River City in Utah. In 2025, Bill Murray stated that working with the well-trained Tai "was one of the best experience I've ever had in the movies.".

== Reception ==
=== Box office ===
The film's opening weekend was $3,799,504, and it had a domestic gross of $8,315,693.

The film opened against six other wide releases, including Romeo + Juliet and Dear God. Family features Space Jam and Jingle All the Way were released two and three weeks later. Incidentally Bill Murray also appeared uncredited in Space Jam which proved to be much more successful at the box office.

=== Critical response ===
Critics generally responded with negative reviews, Stephen Holden of The New York Times called the vision of the film a mis-fire: "The very idea conjures up visions of classic sight gags in which man and beast fail to communicate, or worse, fail to get along. Think of elegant circus tricks executed in the wrong place at precisely the wrong time. Think of an elephantine stubbornness that makes the most recalcitrant donkey look like an obedient eager beaver. Think of a rampage in a supermarket or a spontaneous grand entrance at a chi-chi social event, and you can begin to see the possibilities".

Entertainment Weekly gave the film a "D" rating and Lisa Schwarzbaum wrote poorly of the script and minor characters "is windy, and the occasional laughs are as heavy-footed as the thunking lead pachyderm herself. Furthermore, a couple of its costars are probably wondering what in the Sam Hill they were thinking when they signed on, since they are singularly ill-used."

ReelViews's James Berardinelli awarded the film 2 and a half out of 4 stars. While noting his appreciation of the comedy routines, he was critical of the acting performances: "Murray did his share of ad-libbing here, which is probably a reason why several of the comic sequences work. Since Murray is simply 'being Murray', there isn't a lot of intensive acting going on. As a result, there are long stretches like watching a standup routine shot on location with a very unusual "straight man".

Roger Ebert awarded the film 1 and a half out of 4 stars and was also critical towards Murray's performance: "the energy isn't there. Murray often chooses to play a laid-back, detached character, but this time he's so detached he's almost absent. He chooses to work in a low key, and the other actors, in matching his energy level, make a movie that drones instead of hums". Yet, Ebert enjoyed the comedy's humor: "Murray's portrait of an inspirational speaker is right on target, and filled out with lots of subtle touches of movement and dialog, and there is humor".

Rotten Tomatoes gives the film a rating of 13% from 16 reviews.

== Soundtrack ==
Larger Than Life: Original United Artists Motion Picture Soundtrack

Soundtrack album by Various artists
- Released: 1996
- Genre: Soundtrack
- Length: 30:48
- Labels: Milan Records; 73138357832

The score for Larger than Life was composed by Miles Goodman, who died two months before the film's release. This was Goodman's penultimate score.

#	Title	Performer(s)	Writer(s)	Time
1	"Life Is a Carnival"	The Band	Robbie Robertson, Rick Danko, Levon Helm	3:55
2	"Psycho"	Jack Kittel	Leon Payne	3:13
3	"Main Title"	Miles Goodman	Goodman	2:28
4	"Salad Bar"	Miles Goodman	Goodman	1:47
5	"Dad's Trunck"	Miles Goodman	Goodman	2:18
6	"Flying Elephant"	Miles Goodman	Goodman	3:31
7	"An Elephant Miracle"	Miles Goodman	Goodman	2:03
8	"Airport Chase"	Miles Goodman	Goodman	2:59
9	"Swimming"	Miles Goodman	Goodman	2:20
10	"The Magnificent Seven Theme"	Elmer Bernstein	Bernstein	2:46
11	"The Blue Danube"	Johann Strauss	Strauss	3:05

=== Additional songs ===
- "Touch a Hand, Make a Friend" written by Homer Banks, Carl Hampton and Raymond Jackson performed by The Staple Singers
- "Everybody Loves a Train" written by David Hidalgo and Louie Pérez performed by Los Lobos
- "Hermanos Alou" written by Tiesco Del Rey performed by Tiesco Del Rey
- "Home Sweet Honky Tonk" written by Curtis Wright and T. J. Knight performed by Curtis Wright
- "Just A Lucky So & So" written by Mack David and Duke Ellington performed by Charles Brown
- "She Wore a Yellow Ribbon" written by Richard Hageman
- "We've Only Just Begun" written by Paul Williams and Roger Nichols
- "You Made Me Love You" written by Joseph McCarthy and James V. Monaco
