= Scrapbook (film) =

2000 American horror film by Eric Stanze

- Directed by: Eric Stanze
- Written by: Tommy Biondo
- Produced by: Eric Stanze
- Starring: Emily Haack; Todd Tevlin; Elizabeth Hammock
- Edited by: Eric Stanze
- Release date: June 2000

Scrapbook is a 2000 American horror film about a young woman who is kidnapped, held captive, repeatedly beaten and raped for several days. The title refers to a scrapbook that her captor uses as a record of the ordeals of his victims.

== Plot ==
Scrapbook begins with opening credits rolling while a kidnapped woman has a frantic discussion in the dark with an incoherent female voice. As the credits conclude, the door to the van opens and the woman discovers, to her horror, that the incoherent voice belonged to a disemboweled woman. A man reaches in and removes the disemboweled woman.

We then see a flashback about a child named Leonard. He looks in on his sister, who is half-naked and apparently aroused. She notices him and takes him into her room, where she proceeds to molest him. A young man enters the room and is disgusted with Leonard. He angrily pulls him downstairs, where he proceeds to rape the boy.

The film then cuts to the present, where Leonard has grown up into a young man and kidnapper of the females from the introduction. Clara is his latest victim. Leonard has her tied to a chair in a large, unkempt trailer home in the middle of nowhere. The walls and furniture are adorned with photos and body parts of his past victims. He reveals his scrapbook to Clara, in which he forced his past victims to document their horrific experiences at his hands. He then tells her that he plans for her to be his "last chapter" before he tries to have the book published, which he believes will lead to fame and fortune. Leonard then drags Clara into a room with the words "I'm winning" scrawled on the wall, presumably in blood. He then violently beats and rapes her, and then urinates on her.

Clara is beaten, raped, and abused in various ways throughout the movie, as she tries to find a way to escape. Finally Clara comes to realize that in order to survive she must manipulate him through what he writes in the scrapbook. Slowly Leonard starts to give her food and clothes. Clara pretends that she wants to make love to Leonard and uses duct tape to tie his arms and legs to the cot. Thereafter, she stabs Leonard on the bottom of his feet with a knife and takes pictures of him in pain. She puts those pictures in the scrapbook and the film ends with her walking away from the house.

== Production ==
Scrapbook was directed in 1998 by Eric Stanze and is St. Louis-based production company Wicked Pixel Cinema's third feature film.

== Release ==
In the United States, it was released in 2000 by Sub Rosa Studios, and re-released in 2005 by Image Entertainment. It has also been released internationally, including a censored version released in the UK.

== Criticism ==
Scrapbook has been commended and criticized for its explicit depiction of rape, which some reviewers claim borders on pornography. In the United Kingdom, 15 minutes and 24 seconds were cut from the film to comply with the BBFC's "18" rating.

== Awards ==
Scrapbook was named the number one independent movie of 2001 by Rue Morgue Magazine. At the 2001 B-Movie Film Festival, Scrapbook won Best Screenplay and Best B-Movie Villain, both posthumously awarded to Tommy Biondo. In 2007, it won Best Feature at the Fright Night Film Festival in Louisville, Kentucky.
