= Dominik Tiefenthaler =

Austrian-German actor

- Born: 1971 (age 54–55); Switzerland
- Occupation: Actor
- Years active: 2003–present
- Relatives: Meinrad Tiefenthaler (grandfather)

Dominik Tiefenthaler (German pronunciation: [dɔmɪnɪk tiːfəntaːlɐ]) (born 1971) is an Austrian-German actor, mainly known for his work in The Bombing of Pan Am 103 and Paranoid on Netflix. His other work includes Gossip Girl, The Good Wife, Person of Interest, Blue Bloods, The Blacklist, Boardwalk Empire, and the dramatic films Maybe Tomorrow and An Act of War. He has also done voice-over projects, including Grand Theft Auto IV and Wolfenstein: The New Order.

== Biography ==
Dominik Tiefenthaler was born in Switzerland, to an Austrian father and a German mother. He grew up in Kreuzlingen, a small town near Zurich, with his four sisters and one brother. He enrolled in the Medical School of the University Zurich, and after receiving his MD Degree worked for two years in the Neurosurgical Department of the Cantonal Hospital in St. Gallen, Switzerland. He moved to New York City in 2000, studied acting with William Esper and John Dapolito, and voice and speech with Shane Ann Younts. In the spring of 2004, he co-founded the Incumbo Theater Company in New York City, but left the group after two years to focus on a career in film and television.

Tiefenthaler is the grandson of the Austrian historian and archivist Meinrad Tiefenthaler. Once married, now divorced, he lives on the Upper East Side of Manhattan.

=== Theatre ===
In 2018, Tiefenthaler played the role of the Janitor in The Lehman Trilogy at the Lyttelton Theatre of the Royal National Theatre in London. The production starred Simon Russell Beale, Ben Miles and Adam Godley and was directed by Sam Mendes. Tiefenthaler also understudied the role of Emanuel Lehman (played by Ben Miles). In August 2019, after The Lehman Trilogy had moved to the Piccadilly Theatre in the London West End, Tiefenthaler took over the role of Emanuel from Ben Miles and finished the last four weeks of the run alongside Simon Russell Beale and Adam Godley.

=== Film and television ===
In 2010, Tiefenthaler portrayed Swiss detective Yan Glassey, the lead investigator of the infamous Pink Panthers, an international gang of jewelry thieves, in an episode of America's Most Wanted.

After shooting the film Lenßen – Der Film, for the German TV station Sat.1 (primetime television premiere on January 8, 2011), Tiefenthaler returned to the United States to shoot Gossip Girl, where he played Lucien, the royal liaison to Louis Grimaldi.

In the following years, he played mostly guest-star characters, among them on CBS's The Good Wife ("Je Ne Sais What?"), Person of Interest ("Relevance"), Blue Bloods ("Worst Case Scenario"), and NYC 22 ("Self Cleaning Oven"), NBC's The Blacklist ("The Good Samaritan"), abc's Zero Hour ("Chain") (opposite Anthony Edwards), and HBO's Boardwalk Empire ("All In").

In 2014, Tiefenthaler was seen in three film projects: Guillaume Canet's 1970s crime drama Blood Ties, The Projectionist (a thriller about PTSD), and Maybe Tomorrow, for which he won Best Supporting Actor at the "Golden Door International Film Festival".

In March 2016, it was announced that Tiefenthaler was cast as Detective Walti Merian, in the new eight-part British drama Paranoid. The series was commissioned by ITV and produced by StudioCanal's British production company Red Production Company. Netflix will serve as a co-producer on the series, and will stream the series worldwide outside the UK.

Tiefenthaler guest-starred as Swiss police captain Dante Graf in the first season's third episode of CBS's FBI: International ("Secrets as Weapons") in October 2021.

In 2024, Tiefenthaler was cast as Edwin Bollier in the British television drama series Lockerbie, commissioned by BBC One and Netflix.

== Filmography ==
=== Film ===
Year	Film	Role	Notes
2015	An Act of War	Det. Tom Nicks	
2014	Blood Ties	Ruby Bartender	
2012	Maybe Tomorrow	Graham Seifert	Best Supporting Actor
2011	Lenßen – Der Film	Markus Berger	Sat.1
2011	Decent Men	Heinrich Himmler	Short film
2010	Wonder...	Doctor	
2009	Born from the Foot	Andy	
2008	After Hiroshima Mon Amour...	Actor	Short film
2007	The Triangle	Actor	Short film
2006	Posttags	Pvt. Cole Pullman	
2005	Street Therapy	Flower Guy	Short film

=== TV ===
Year	Show	Role	Company	Notes
2025	The Bombing of Pan Am 103	Edwin Bollier	BBC One/Netflix	Six Part Drama Series
2021	FBI: International	Dante Graf	CBS	Season 1, Episode 3: "Secrets as Weapons"
2016	Paranoid	Walti Merian	ITV/Netflix	Eight Part Drama Series
2015	Blue Bloods	Nicholas Costa	CBS	Season 6, Episode 1: "Worst Case Scenario"
2014	The Blacklist	Fyodor	NBC	Season 1, Episode 6: "The Good Samaritan"
2013	Boardwalk Empire	Rudy	HBO	Season 4, Episode 4: "All In"
2013	Zero Hour	Adam the Groundsman	ABC	Season 1, Episode 4: "Chain"
2013	Person of Interest	Berlin Police Man	CBS	Season 2, Episode 16: "Relevance"
2013	The Good Wife	Dedrick Klein	CBS	Season 4, Episode 12: "Je Ne Sais What?"
2012	NYC 22	Martinus Novak	CBS	Season 1, Episode 5: "Self Cleaning Oven"
2011	Gossip Girl	Lucien	CW	Season 4, Episode 19: Petty in Pink
2010	America's Most Wanted: America Fights Back	Detective Yan Glassey	FOX	Episode: "The Pink Panthers"
2003	Resident Life	Resident	TLC	TV miniseries

=== Video games ===
Year	Show	Role
2014	Wolfenstein: The New Order	Enemy Soldier
2008	Grand Theft Auto IV	Coke Addict
