= Operation Dumbo Drop =

1995 film produced by Walt Disney Pictures

- Theatrical release poster
- Directed by: Simon Wincer
- Screenplay by: Gene Quintano; Jim Kouf
- Story by: Jim Morris
- Produced by: Diane Nabatoff; David Madden
- Starring: Danny Glover; Ray Liotta; Denis Leary; Doug E. Doug; Corin Nemec
- Cinematography: Russell Boyd
- Edited by: O. Nicholas Brown
- Music by: David Newman
- Production companies: Walt Disney Pictures; Interscope Communications; PolyGram Filmed Entertainment
- Distributed by: Buena Vista Pictures Distribution
- Release date: July 28, 1995
- Running time: 108 minutes
- Country: United States
- Language: English
- Budget: $24 million
- Box office: $24,670,346

Operation Dumbo Drop is a 1995 American war comedy film directed by Simon Wincer. The screenplay was written by Gene Quintano and Jim Kouf, based on a true story by United States Army Major Jim Morris. The film stars Danny Glover and Ray Liotta as Green Berets during the Vietnam War in 1968, who attempt to transport an elephant through jungle terrain to a local South Vietnamese village which in turn helps American forces monitor Viet Cong activity. Denis Leary, Doug E. Doug, and Corin Nemec also star. The film deals broadly with themes of war, politics and animal welfare.

The film was produced by Interscope Communications and PolyGram Filmed Entertainment. It was distributed by Walt Disney Pictures theatrically, and by Buena Vista Home Entertainment for home media.

Operation Dumbo Drop premiered in theaters nationwide in the United States on July 28, 1995, grossing $24,670,346 in domestic ticket receipts. The film was a moderate financial success after its theatrical run, and received mixed-to-negative reviews from critics.

== Plot ==
During the Vietnam War, Green Beret Captain Sam Cahill has been developing good relations between the United States and the Montagnard Vietnamese villagers of Dak Nhe, which occupies ground suitable for observing the clandestine Ho Chi Minh trail. With his tour of duty ending, Cahill must train his successor, and Captain T.C. Doyle learns about the delicate nature of Vietnamese customs as well as counterintelligence involving covert enemy activity.

A local child steals a Nestlé Crunch bar from Doyle's backpack. Soldiers from the NVA discover the wrapper, interpreting it as proof the village is cooperating with the Americans. On Brigadier Nguyen's orders, NVA Captain Quang kills the villagers' elephant as punishment. The villagers blame Doyle for the elephant's death, and Cahill promises to replace the slain elephant in time for a scheduled spiritual festival.

Major Pederson assigns Cahill and Doyle to secure and deliver a new elephant to the villagers, assisted by Specialist Harvey Ashford and Specialist Lawrence Farley. Cahill also blackmails Chief Warrant Officer David Poole into helping. They purchase an elephant known as Bo Tat (Bồ Tát) from a local Vietnamese trader and bring along child handler, Linh, whose verbal commands Bo Tat responds well to. Following a failed air transport, the soldiers use a combination of methods to reach Pleiku Air Base before the final stage of their journey to Dak Nhe.

At Pleiku Air Base, the team learns that the Ho Chi Minh Trail has shifted, and since Dak Nhe is no longer strategically placed, the mission to replace the elephant is cancelled. A nearby CIA airstrip has been destroyed by the NVA, making a landing by plane impossible. Against regulations, the team commandeers a cargo aircraft to parachute from over Dak Nhe. Enemy fire forces them to parachute out early with Bo Tat. Quang is lying in wait, with orders from Nguyen to also kill Bo Tat, but he refuses, explaining that "I did not join this army to shoot elephants, especially ones that fly." The soldiers land unharmed in and around the village, though Ashford, gets hung up in a tree and separated from the others. NVA forces threaten to take the team hostage and kill the elephant. Ashford frees himself and creates a diversion to distract then incapacitate the NVA troops, and high-ranking enemy officers are captured.

The villagers hold their festival with Bo Tat in the place of honor. Cahill is told by radio the supply route has changed direction again, making Dak Nhe a strategic location once more. The U.S. Army sanctions the relief mission post-facto, and confirm Doyle's original mission, to replace Cahill as liaison officer in the village.

== Cast ==
- Danny Glover as Captain Sam Cahill
- Ray Liotta as Captain T.C. Doyle
- Denis Leary as Chief Warrant Officer 3 David Poole
- Doug E. Doug as Specialist 4 Harvey Ashford
- Corin Nemec as Specialist 5 Lawrence Farley
- Tcheky Karyo as Goddard
- Dinh Thien Le as Linh
- James Hong as Y B'ham
- Hoang Ly as Brigadier Nguyen
- Vo Trung Anh as Captain Quang
- Marshall Bell as Major Pederson
- Tim Kelleher as Major Morris
- Raymond Cruz as Staff Sergeant Adams
- Tai as Bo Tat

== Production ==
=== Development ===
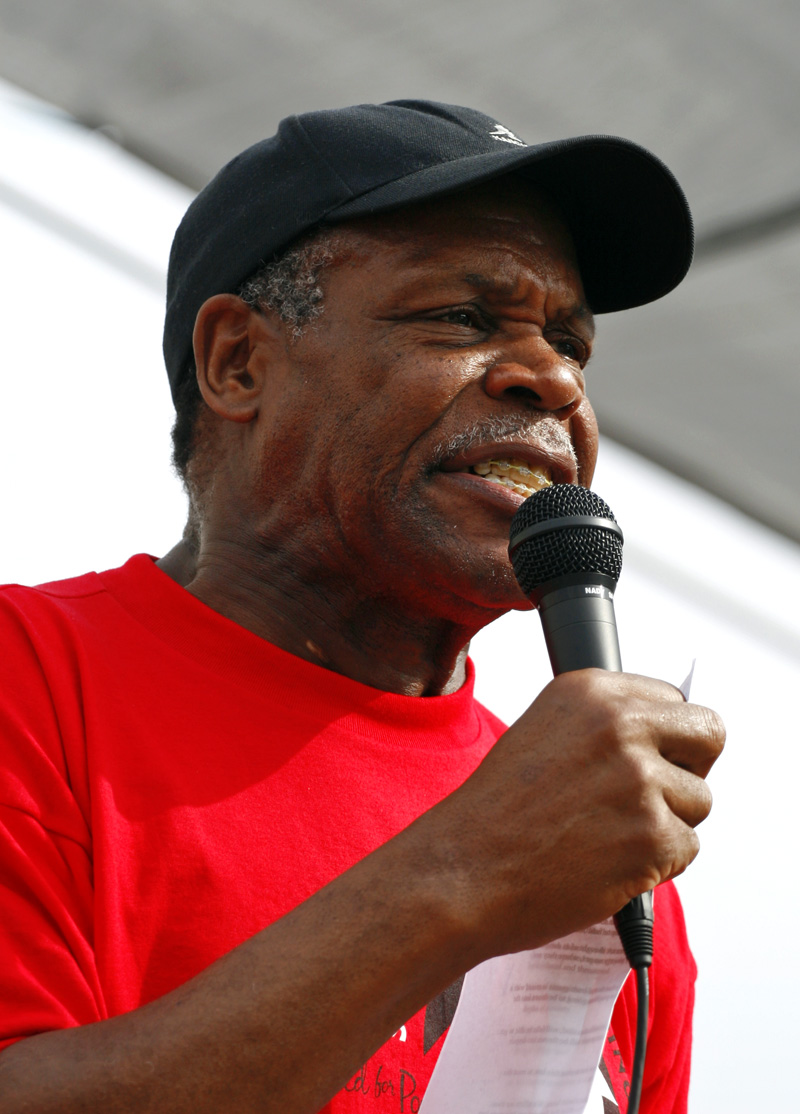
Actor Danny Glover who portrayed Cpt. Sam Cahill

Operation Dumbo Drop is based on a true story about the cooperation of South Vietnamese villagers and the U.S. Army during the Vietnam War in the late 1960s. The U.S. Army viewed many villages as having a strategic value due to their proximity to enemy supply routes, such as the Ho Chi Minh trail. Elephants found in villages were typically the primary source of farm labor. To appease hostile villagers, the U.S. offered elephants as a token of appreciation. According to actor Glover, one such operation took place specifically on April 4, 1968, but received fairly little coverage due to the death on the same day of a Vietnamese military leader and also the assassination of Martin Luther King, Jr. in Memphis. The film is based on a story depicted by retired United States Army Major Jim Morris, who related his experiences surrounding the elephant air-drops during the war.

A 26-year-old Asian elephant Tai was used for the part of Bo Tat. The female elephant was chosen for the part because of her calm demeanor and friendly disposition, which allowed her to be placid and relaxed during scenes with simulated gunfire. Many depictions in the film such as the elephant being sedated and lying down or following that, moving her legs and standing up were actually accomplished with an animal trainer.

=== Set design and filming ===
Filming took place primarily on location in Thailand. Other filming locations included film studios in Los Angeles, California and Miami, Florida.

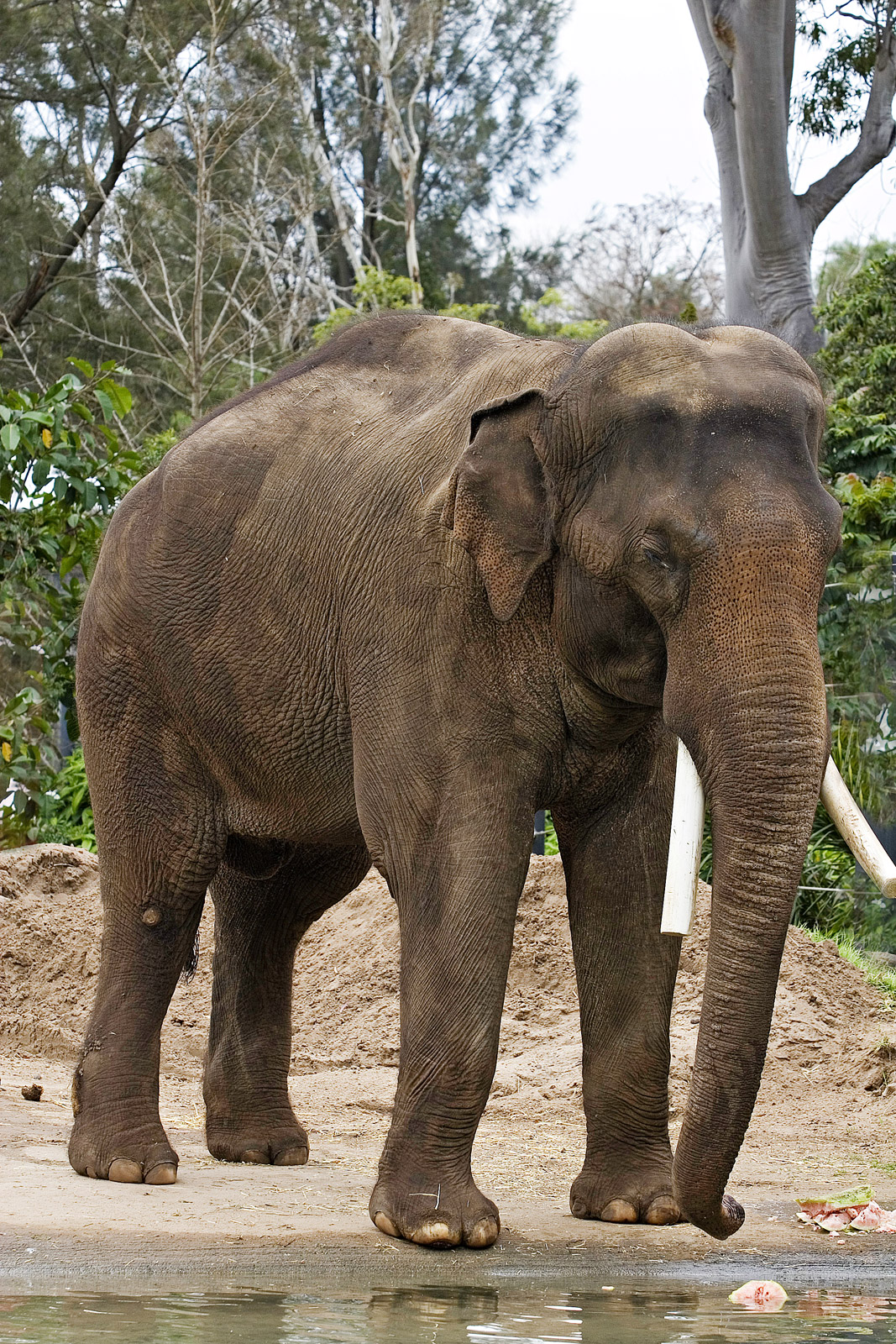
An Asian elephant similar to one used during filming

Certain scenes where the elephant was shown aboard a marine boat actually had I-beams under the deck to support the animal. Additionally, ballast was added to the boat to keep it afloat. One of the later scenes where the elephant was supposedly aboard the aircraft while under gun and missile fire was filmed in cuts, with both fake elephants and a mechanical elephant being used in the jump. The real elephant was used only for close-ups.

During the village food cart scene, a trainer as an extra, ran alongside the elephant telling her to keep moving. There was also another trainer in front of her encouraging her constant movement and ensuring that nothing got in her path. Wire was attached to crates and tables to pull them over as the elephant ran by, making it appear as though she were knocking everything aside. In a flashback scene, the character of Linh sees an elephant being shot, as he tells of how his parents were killed. The film crew accomplished this feat by instructing the trainer to tell the elephant to lie down, while then shooting the scene in slow motion. To ensure the health of the elephant, her food and water, including her bathing water, was shipped from the U.S. to Thailand throughout the production. Furthermore, she was bathed in purified water every day. Young Thai men were hired to hold umbrellas over the elephant when the cameras were not shooting. Throughout filming, almost everything the elephant walked on was reinforced with timber and steel. Twelve elephants were also used as extras in the jungle mountain scenes.

According to Denis Leary, "The movie was so painstakingly terrible — because it took a long time to shoot — that all of us actually had pictures of the things that we were gonna buy with our money to keep us going. I had a picture of this property in Connecticut. Ray Liotta had a picture of a house that he was building outside L.A., and Danny Glover had a picture of a property in San Francisco he was gonna buy. That's how we would get through it."

=== Soundtrack ===
The original motion picture soundtrack for Operation Dumbo Drop, was released by Hollywood Records on July 28, 1995. It features songs recorded by veteran musicians Marvin Gaye, Aretha Franklin and Jackie Wilson among others. The Spencer Davis Group can also be heard in the movie.

The music for the film was composed by David Newman; while being edited by Tom Villano.

The sound effects in the film were supervised by William Jacobs. The mixing of the sound elements was orchestrated by Doc Kane. "When I See an Elephant Fly" is taken from the Disney animated film, Dumbo, with the music composed by Oliver Wallace and is the only Disney animated song to be used in a soundtrack album on Hollywood Records. In 2017, Intrada Records released an expanded edition of Newman's score paired with Alex North's complete 17-minute score for Good Morning, Vietnam.

== Reception ==
=== Critical response ===
Among mainstream critics in the United States, Operation Dumbo Drop received mixed reviews. On Rotten Tomatoes the film has an approval rating of 28% based on reviews from 25 critics, with an average score of 4.5 out of 10. The critics' consensus reads, "The Vietnam War would seem an unlikely backdrop for a family-friendly comedy involving an airlifted elephant, and Operation Dumbo Drop lands with a thud." On Metacritic the film has a score of 48% based on reviews from 22 critics, indicating "mixed or average reviews". Audiences polled by CinemaScore gave the film an average grade of "A−" on an A+ to F scale.

Hal Hinson, writing in The Washington Post said, the film is "so peculiar that one barely knows where to start." He noted that "the real audience for the film—the kids—will have not the slightest hint of all this. They'll be far too consumed—as well they should be—with the goofy antics of Bo-Tat, who, as movie elephants go, is actually pretty wonderful." In mixed fashion, he concluded by saying, "Operation Dumbo Drop isn't a shoddy piece of work or a cynical one. It's well acted, well directed and far more interesting visually than most children's films. In its heart of hearts, though, it is more than slightly schizoid. On the one hand, it's a diverting entertainment for children and young adults; on the other, it's a ludicrous fantasy about a war whose complexities cannot be contained by facile metaphors." Roger Ebert in the Chicago Sun-Times offered a mostly negative review commenting, "the story is so sentimentalized, so sanitized into a family comedy, that I do doubt the reality was anything like this." He expressed disappointment by saying, "There is a moment when Nguyen can shoot the elephant, but chooses not to, using dialogue that I somehow doubt was uttered by any member of the Viet Cong at any time: 'I did not join this army to shoot elephants - especially ones that fly.' " He concluded "As a family movie, "Operation Dumbo Drop" is sort of entertaining. As history, it's shameless." In the Deseret News, critic Chris Hicks reserved a mild compliment for some of the lead acting and directing saying, "Glover and Liotta play against each other pretty well, though there is none of the chemistry Glover has with Mel Gibson in the "Lethal Weapon" films." He noted how director Wincer "moves things along quite well, and there is some impressive stunt work". But overall, he felt the film's screenplay was "strictly by-the-numbers stuff and contains some wildly implausible elements."

"I am not asking that Operation Dumbo Drop be hard-edged realism. It's not that kind of movie. I'm not even very bothered by the scene where the elephant's chute doesn't open, and Liotta goes into free-fall to save it. (No, he doesn't grab the elephant and open his own chute so they can ride down together.) What bothers me is that a chapter of our history is being rewritten and trivialized, as we win in the movie theaters a war that did not, in fact, turn out very well for us."
—Roger Ebert, writing in the Chicago Sun-Times

Janet Maslin, writing in The New York Times, felt the film was at its most, "pleasantly innocuous when it doesn't strain itself with that kind of moralizing and instead concentrates on the logistical nightmare of elephant-moving. Beyond that, it doesn't have much plot, but the idea of tossing an elephant out of an airplane certainly makes for adequate suspense." In comparison to other films, Maslin thought, "The model for this is a lot closer to McHale's Navy, which is mentioned here, than it is to Platoon. But in the end, this generally lighthearted Vietnam caper does try to teach a lesson of sorts, since the gift of an elephant becomes a form of war reparations." Joe Leydon writing in Variety, felt Operation Dumbo Drop was "a well-crafted and entertaining pic with broad, cross-generational appeal." and that "Glover is well cast and establishes an effectively edgy give-and-take with Liotta." He also reserved praise for "Russell Boyd's splendid cinematography and Rick Lazzarini's convincing animatronics." Kevin Thomas of the Los Angeles Times viewed Operation Dumbo Drop as a "pleasing family adventure-comedy". He thought the film was "handsomely photographed by Russell Boyd" and that under "Simon Wincer's brisk, efficient direction, Glover, Liotta, Leary, et al., give the kind of full-bodied portrayals essential to making basically formulaic material come alive." Lisa Schwarzbaum writing for Entertainment Weekly gave the film a positive "B Grade" rating and viewed the film as a "concept, supposedly based on a true story, is weird — this is what Vietnam movies have come to? But at least the Disney quadruped has the grace to say nothing, and Leary, still an interesting motormouth, knows enough not to smoke or swear when there are elephants around." Peter Stack writing for the San Francisco Chronicle, saw the film as "not the terrible movie that its ubiquitous trailers would indicate. But it is an odd one," and that "Glover and Liotta, though not exactly great comic actors, play off each other with real spark, the two vying for command of the outlandish mission to deliver the elephant across 200 miles of impossible jungle terrain to the mountain village."

Gene Siskel of the Chicago Tribune gave the film a thumbs down review calling it, "preposterous" and saying "I'm not buying it all the way through." He also ridiculed the outdoor market scene as "the world's most dangerous profession in the movies; selling fruit on a city street." Gary Kamiya of The San Francisco Examiner bluntly referred to the film as descending "upon the hapless viewer like a vast load of pachyderm dung." He believed "even the most vigorous tear-duct manipulation, and a few funny scenes, cannot save "Dumbo" from its dominant tone of stilted corniness and prefab sentimentality." Critic Joey O'Bryan of The Austin Chronicle did not waste any time with negativity saying, "Operation Dumbo Drop is a terribly irresponsible picture that seems shamefully patterned after director's Wincer's other box office success, Free Willy". He thought the film had numerous pitfalls including, "illogical scripting, inconsistent performances, sloppy direction, or the unbelievably offensive oversimplification of the atrocities of the Vietnam war". He concluded his review by exclaiming "Operation Dumbo Drop is a disastrous miscalculation that leaves the viewer with only one burning thought: 'What the hell were they thinking?' " Left unimpressed, critic Leonard Maltin wrote that the film was "Surprisingly flat until the climax" and thought the events relating to the Vietnam War was "an odd choice of setting and subject for a Disney family film ... which explains the lack of swearing and the toning-down of Leary's conniving character."

=== Box office ===
The film premiered in cinemas on July 28, 1995 in wide release throughout the United States. During its opening weekend, the film opened in a distant 6th place grossing $6,392,155 in business showing at 2,980 locations. The film Waterworld soundly beat its competition during that weekend opening in first place with $21,171,780. The film's revenue dropped by 33.2% in its second week of release, earning $4,271,252. For that particular weekend, the film fell to 9th place screening in 2,158 theaters but still holding on to a top ten position. Waterworld, remained in first place grossing $13,452,035 in box office revenue. The film went on to top out domestically at $24,670,346 in total ticket sales through a 21-week theatrical run. For 1995 as a whole, the film would cumulatively rank at a box office performance position of 67.

== Home media ==
The film was initially released on VHS on March 19, 1996. The Region 1 Code widescreen edition of the film was released on DVD in the United States on May 6, 2003 and includes a Closed Caption feature; Dolby Digital 5.1 surround sound; a French language track; Spanish subtitles; and a Full-Screen (1.33:1) option. On April 26, 2016, the film was released on Blu-ray as a Disney Movie Club exclusive.

== Bibliography ==
- Morris, Jim (2003). Fighting Men. St. Martin's Paperbacks. ISBN 978-0-312-98484-7.
- Morris, Jim (1983). War Story. Paladin Press. ISBN 978-0-87364-147-0.
- Morris, Jim (2004). The Devil's Secret Name. St. Martin's Paperbacks. ISBN 978-0-312-99341-2.
