= Kiowa Gordon =

American actor

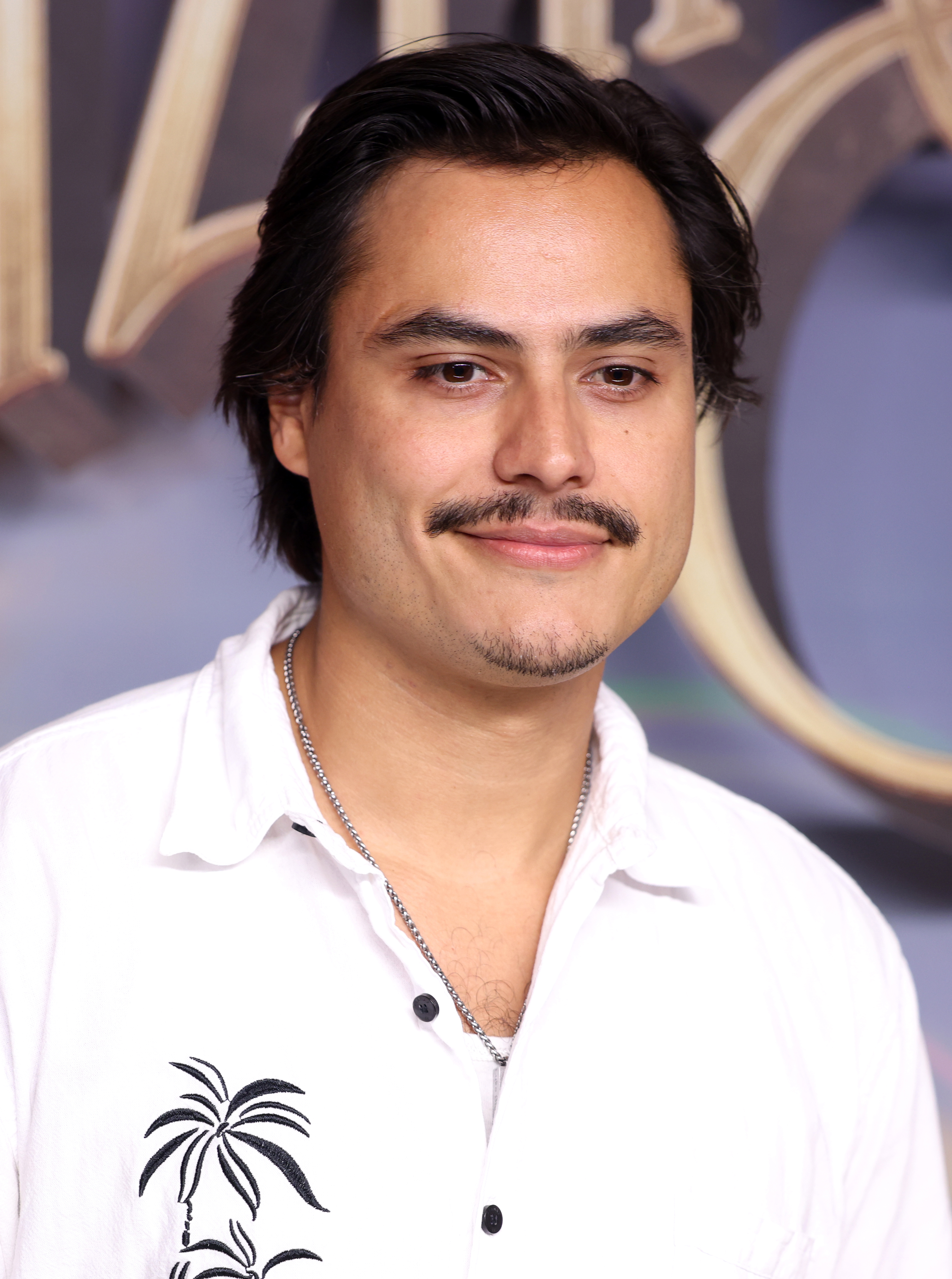
- Gordon in 2025
- Born: Kiowa Joseph Gordon; March 25, 1990 (age 36); Berlin, Germany
- Occupations: Actor, vocalist
- Years active: 2009–present
- Children: 1

Kiowa Joseph Gordon (born March 25, 1990) is an American actor. He is best known for his role as shapeshifter Embry Call in The Twilight Saga, as well as Junior in the TV series The Red Road. Since 2022, Gordon has played Jim Chee in the AMC series Dark Winds.

== Early life ==
Gordon was born in Berlin, Germany, where his father, Thomas Gordon, was working. He is the seventh of eight children (Mac, Sean, Aaron, Josh, Cheyenne, Sariah, Lakota). His mother, Camille Nighthorse Gordon, is also an actress. Gordon is a member of the Hualapai Tribe of Northern Arizona through his mother's side. He is of European ancestry from his father.

His family moved back to the U.S. when he was two years old, and he grew up in Arizona, where he attended Cactus Shadows High School in Cave Creek, Arizona. He attended the LDS church for a while in the same ward as Twilight author Stephenie Meyer.

Kiowa was briefly the vocalist of a progressive metal band called Touché, leaving it to focus on acting.

== Career ==
In 2009, Gordon played shapeshifter Embry Call in New Moon, based on Stephenie Meyer's novel of the same name. He has said that he was approached one day at church by Stephenie Meyer as she thought he would be perfect for the wolf pack. He then attended an open casting where he landed the role of Jacob Black's best friend. Gordon replaced Krys Hyatt (who played Embry in Twilight) in New Moon, Eclipse, and Breaking Dawn.

Gordon was set to play Brad in the proposed American film Into The Darkness, but the film never came to fruition. He portrayed Jake Kingston in the 2015 thriller Wind Walkers, which tells a Native American urban legend. Gordon starred in An Act of War, released on Netflix in 2015. The film was directed by Ryan M. Kennedy and produced by Atit Shah.

In 2021, it was announced that Gordon would star as Jim Chee in Dark Winds, a psychological thriller television series on AMC. Its executive producers include Robert Redford, George R. R. Martin & Zahn McClarnon (who also stars as Joe Leaphorn). It premiered on 12 June 2022 and has received very positive reviews. In February 2026, ahead of the fourth-season premiere, the series was renewed for an eight-episode fifth season.

== Filmography ==
=== Film ===
Year	Title	Role	Notes
2009	The Twilight Saga: New Moon	Embry Call	
2010	The Twilight Saga: Eclipse	Embry Call	
2011	Into the Darkness	Brad	
2011	Murder for Dummys	Andrew	
2011	The Twilight Saga: Breaking Dawn	Embry Call	
2012	The Lesser Blessed	Johnny Beck	
2012	The Projectionist	Private LockLear	
2014	The Red Road	Junior Van Der Veen	Main cast
2014	Drunktown's Finest	Julius	
2015	Wind Walkers	Jack Kingston	
2017	Painted Woman	Chato	
2018	Through Black Spruce	Jesse	
2019	Roswell, New Mexico	Flint Manes	TV series; Recurring role
2019	Blood Quantum	Lysol	
2019	Castle in the Ground	Stevie	
2020	The Liberator	Corporal Kanuna	TV miniseries
2022–Present	Dark Winds	Jim Chee	TV series; Main role
2022	Quantum Cowboys	Frank	Feature Film; Lead
2024	Rez Ball	Antonio Freeman	
