= Joseph R. Gannascoli =

American actor (born 1959)

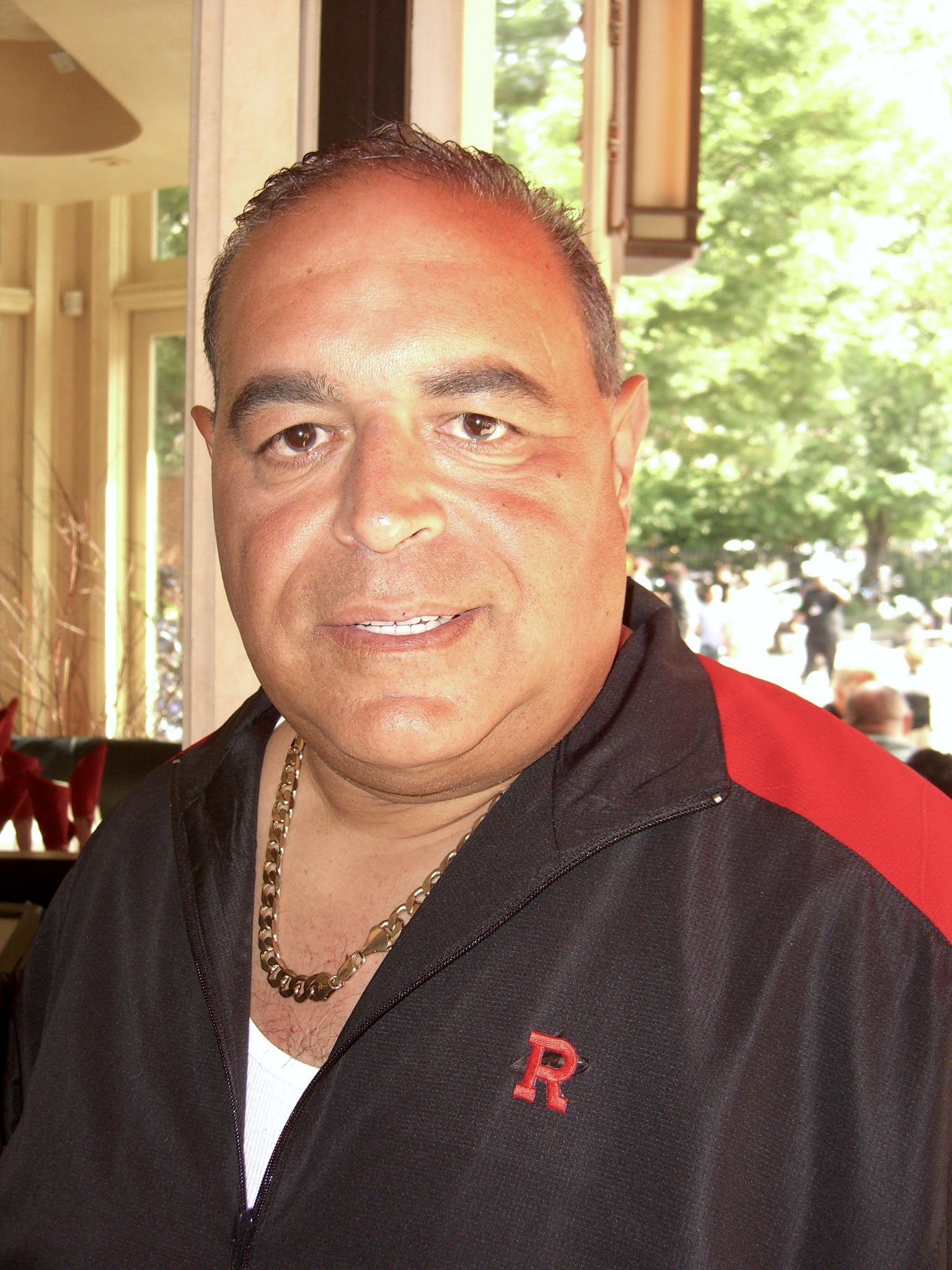
- Gannascoli in 2011
- Born: February 15, 1959 (age 67); Brooklyn, New York, U.S.
- Education: St. John's University
- Occupations: Actor; chef; author
- Years active: 1991–present
- Known for: Portraying Vito Spatafore
- Notable work: The Sopranos
- Spouse: Diana Gannascoli (m. 2005)
- Children: 1

Joseph R. Gannascoli (born February 15, 1959) is an American actor and chef. He is best known for his portrayal of Vito Spatafore on the HBO series The Sopranos.

== Early life ==
Gannascoli was born and raised in Brooklyn, New York. In the 1980s, he attended St. John's University for two years, majoring in communications.

== Career ==
Gannascoli received his "big break" in acting from Benicio del Toro, whom he met on the set on Money for Nothing. After appearing in Ed Wood, Del Toro later cast Gannascoli in his directorial debut, Submission. He also introduced him to Sheila Jaffe and Georgianne Walken, who did casting work for the HBO TV series The Sopranos.

Gannascoli appeared in films including Mickey Blue Eyes and television shows including Law & Order before appearing on The Sopranos as a pastry shop patron named "Gino" in the season one episode "The Legend of Tennessee Moltisanti". He later secured a recurring role as Vito Spatafore, the nephew of Richie Aprile, in the season two episode "The Happy Wanderer". Along with Dan Grimaldi playing identical twins Patsy and Phillip "Philly Spoons" Parisi and Saundra Santiago playing identical twins Jeannie and Joannie Cusamano, it was one of the three times that the show used a single actor for separate roles. Prior to the start of Season 6, Gannascoli was promoted to series regular. Gannascoli brought the idea to the writers of making his character gay from a true story of the Gambino crime family, in a book called Murder Machine.

Gannascoli's other film roles include Men in Black III and the 2015 movie An Act of War.

In 2019, he appeared on an episode of the cannabis-themed competition cooking show, Bong Appétit: Cook Off. He appeared with Vincent Pastore on Gordon Ramsay's 24 Hours to Hell and Back on January 21, 2020.

Gannascoli appeared in the pilot episode of Bring on the Dancing Horses, a Prime Video original series with Kate Bosworth.

=== Novel ===
In January 2006, Gannascoli published a crime novel called A Meal to Die For: A Culinary Novel of Crime.

== Filmography ==
=== Film ===
Years	Title	Role	Notes
1993	Money for Nothing	Charlie DiSalvio	
1994	Ed Wood	Security Guard	
1995	Never Talk to Strangers	Carnival Attendant	
1995	Submission	Eddie	Short
1996	Basquiat	Guard at Hospital	
1996	The Funeral	Rocco	
1997	976-WISH	Frankle	Short
1997	Blowfish	Gino Calbrese	
1998	Blunt	Paramedic	
1999	On the Run	Burly Guy	
1999	Mickey Blue Eyes	Jimmy, Gina's Doorman	
2000	Two Family House	Counter Guy	
2004	The Kings of Brooklyn	Trader the Hut	
2004	Never in Our Town	Barber	Short
2005	Meet the Mobsters	Abner Hunnicutt	
2006	Beer League	Giusuppe Primavera	
2006	Dog's Life	Manager	Video
2008	College Road Trip	Mr. Arcara	
2008	The Egg	Ralph	Short
2009	Reality Horror Night	Himself	
2009	Situation	Goat	Short
2010	Corrado	Frankie D'Onofrio	
2010	Circus Maximus	Uncle Vic	
2011	The Reunion	David Bass	
2011	Delsin	Himself	
2012	Men in Black 3	New York Mets Fan #2	
2012	Desperate Endeavors	Neil Bates	
2013	Chasing Taste	Murphy	
2013	Fratello	Tony	
2013	Pray for Us Sinners	Angelo	Short
2013	My Cross to Bear	Danny's Boxing Trainer	Short
2014	Rob the Mob	Dom	
2014	Leaving Circadia	Nat	
2014	Gilgamesh	Senator Higgins	
2014	Other Plans	Gus	
2015	An Act of War	Frank	
2017	Crossed Lines	Cop	
2017	Jason's Letter	Principal (Pratt) Prattoli	
2019	The Brawler	John	
2019	Gabriella	Carlo	Short
2020	The One	Frankie	
2021	Last Call	Charlie	
2021	Burn	-	Short
2022	White Hot Fury	Charlie	Short
2022	King Lahiri	Frabizio Vitelli	

=== Television ===
Year	Title	Role	Notes
1999	The Sopranos	Gino	Episode: "The Legend of Tennessee Moltisanti"
2000–06	The Sopranos	Vito Spatafore	38 episodes
2004	Law & Order	Artie Baldo	Episode: "Everybody Loves Raimondo's"
2011	White Collar	Salvatore	Episode: "On the Fence"
2018	John the Thief	Richard Moon	Recurring Cast
2020	Gordon Ramsay's 24 Hours to Hell and Back	Himself	Episode: "Caneda's White Rooster"; as diners, alongside Vincent Pastore
2022–23	Bring on the Dancing Horses	Sal	Main Cast

=== Video Game ===
Year	Title	Role
2006	The Sopranos: Road to Respect	Vito Spatafore (voice)
