= Jean-Luc Servino =

Italian film director

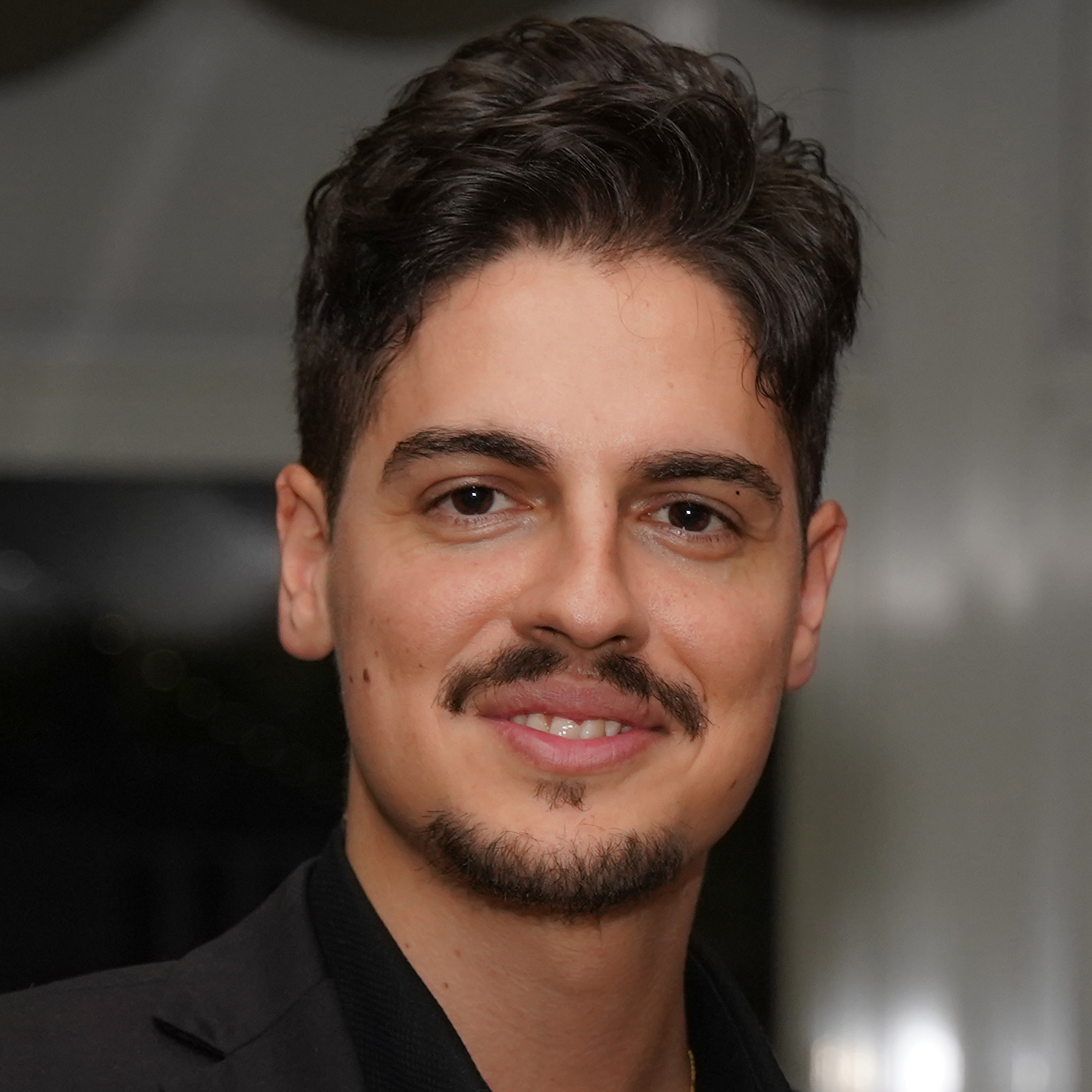
Jean-Luc Servino

Jean-Luc Servino (born November 21, 1989) is an Italian director, writer, screenwriter and cinematographer, best known in the independent circuits for his shorts, winning several awards, including the Culver City Film Festival, the Eurasia International Film Festival for Best Director and Los Angeles Film Awards for Best Cinematographer.

Born and raised in Naples, Servino developed an interest in filmmaking from a young age. He started to shoot shorts in 2014 winning the Web Award at OnAir Festival Sorrento in his first participation in a film festival.

He focused his attention on social issues winning a Humanitarian Award in 2016. In the same year he published his first book, La Visione di Ben. In 2017 he won a Regional Award for Best Musical for an innovative production merging cinema and live theater.

He started his journey to International Film Festivals with Zackary (2017) (dedicated to the father Ferdinando Servino), Whiskey For Robinson (2018) and Dear Gaia (2019), receiving several accolades.

He is considered the dreamers filmmaker to be given the opportunity in 2018 to about 50 indie artists to show up their potential in a web-series called "Edge - For the dreamers". Edge won as best web-series in Sezze.

In 2020 he was awarded "Eccellenza della Città Metropolitana di Napoli" for his artistic achievements.

2021 was the year of "Letter from Professor V", a comedy-drama short film that won several awards around the world, but it is with the experimental project "How About" that he conquers the front page of the MI Mag. "Letter from Professor V" was screened in Rome for a memorial day of the great artist Pier Paolo Pasolini.

In the same way, the 2022 was the year of the thriller short "Goodnight Mister Johnson" but the most considerable award arrived with "I fell in love with a Balloon" who won the Best International MicroShort Film in Hollywood.

In 2023, with the silent short film "We Will Laugh Again", he won as Best Director and Best European Short Film in New York.

He studied filmmaking at London Film Academy and American Film Institute. His own style is a mix of French Nouvelle Vague, Italian neorealism and Russian existentialism, a unique kind of cinema vision, style and technique.

== Filmography ==
- Zackary (2017)
- Whiskey For Robinson (2018)
- I fell in love with a Balloon (2018)
- Dear Gaia (2019)
- Lettera dal professor V (2021)
- Goodnight Mister Johnson (2022)
- ...E ci ridiamo un po' su! (2023)

== Books ==
- La visione di Ben (2016)
