= Natasha Alam =

Uzbekistani-American actress and model

- Наташа Алам
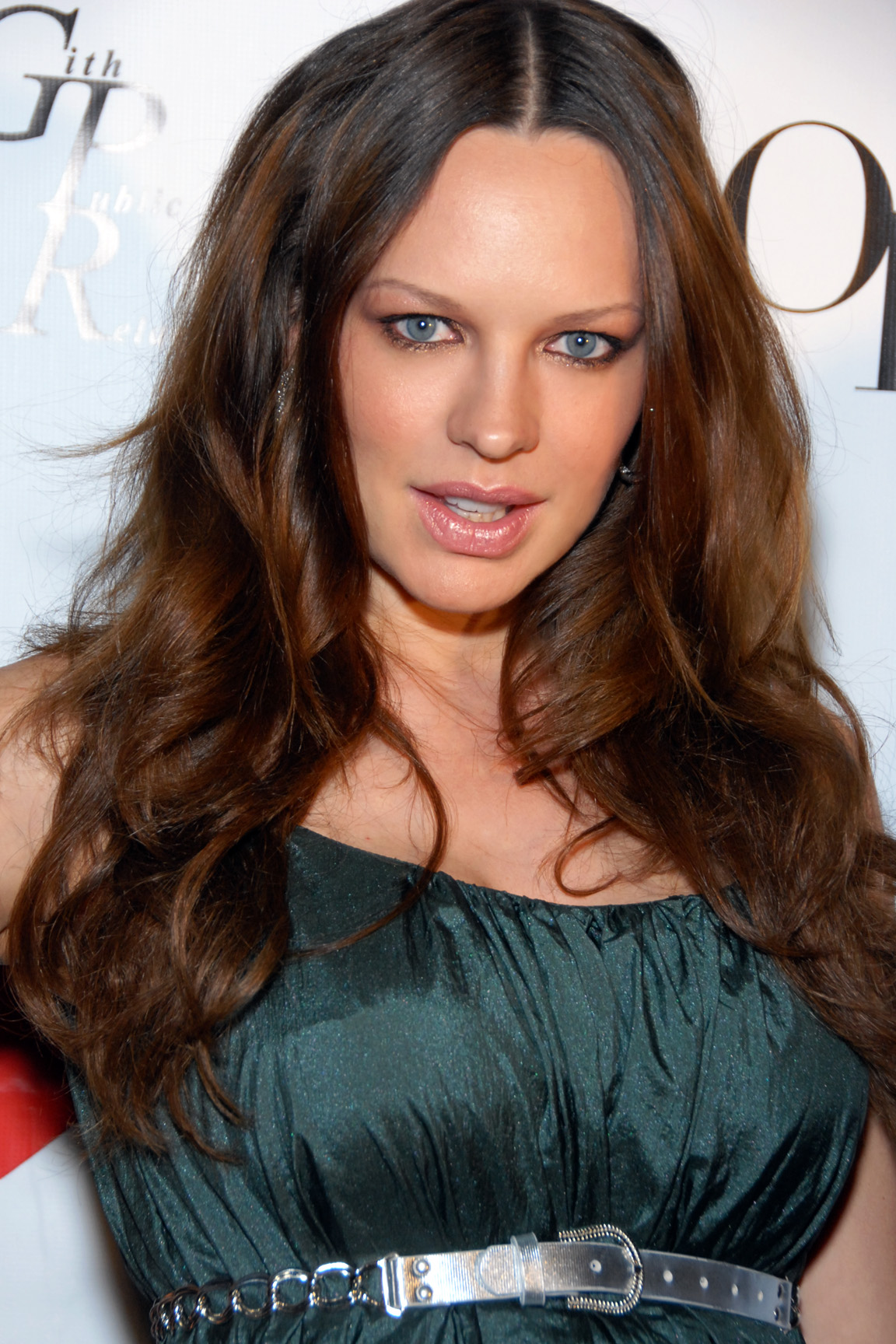
- Natasha Alam in 2009
- Born: Natalia Anatolievna Shimanchuk; March 10, 1983 (age 43); Tashkent, Uzbek SSR, USSR
- Education: Tashkent State Technical University
- Occupations: Actress; Model
- Years active: 2002–present
- Spouse: HH Amir Ebrahim Pahlavi Alam (m. 1998; div. 2004)
- Partner: Amir Ali Fathi
- Children: 1
- Website: imdb/natashaalam.com/

Natasha Alam (Russian: Наталья Анатольевна Шиманчук; born Natalia Anatolievna Shimanchuk, born March 10, 1983) is an Uzbekistani–American actress and model. Alam has starred on True Blood and been a cover model for Maxim and Playboy.

== Early life ==
Natasha Alam was born and raised in Tashkent, Uzbek SSR, Soviet Union in a Russian family. She attended school with the aim of becoming a clothing designer. She attended the Tashkent State Technical University for aviation school. Modeling at school led to modeling at events and eventually moving to Moscow, where she signed with an agency. An Italian modeling agency later signed her, and she moved to Italy.

== Career ==
Her first acting role was on the television show Fastlane (2002). She went on to appear on television shows including CSI, NYPD Blue, Nip/Tuck, The Unit, Entourage, and American Heiress. She also played the recurring role of Ava, a Forrester model, in The Bold and the Beautiful from 2004 to 2007. Films she has appeared in include the 2007 horror movie Shadow Puppets and the 2008 comedy The Women.

In 2010, she appeared in the third season of True Blood as Yvetta, an exotic dancer at Fangtasia, from Estonia. In July of that year, she appeared on the cover, and in the pictorial, of Playboy. The following year, she shot an anti-bullying film with Joe Reitman, and that August. 27 took part in Rock the Mansion, a fashion show for an anti-bullying campaign, at the Playboy Mansion.

== Personal life ==
Sometime after moving to Italy, Alam met Iranian prince Amir Ebrahim Pahlavi Alam and moved with him to New York City. The couple broke up, then reunited, married in 1998, and moved to London, where she began taking acting lessons. Alam said in 2001 that she then "ran away to Los Angeles because I wanted to act." In 2001, her husband joined her, but they divorced in 2004. She and her partner, Joe Campana had a daughter, Valentina, in 2009.

== Filmography ==
=== Film ===
Film
Year	Film	Role	Notes
2006	Spy Games: The Black Wolf Hunt	Tanya	TV movie(Russian)
2006	Shadow Puppets	Amber	
2008	In Twilight's Shadow	Carlisle	Short
2008	The Women	Natasha	
2009	War Wolves	Erika Moore	
2009	No Cell Phones Allowed	Julia	Short
2010	The Black Belle	Belle Gunness	
2010	Bring Me the Head of Lance Henriksen	Natasha	
2011	Guy Suave: Homicidal Spy	Wetsy Swolleninski	TV movie
2013	Huff	Laci	
2014	Dead Sea	Skipper	
2015	An Act of War	Ivana	
2015	Risk for Honor		
2016	The Code of Cain	Sara Ogden	
2016	Bunker: Project 12	Irina	
2018	Beverly Hills Bandits	Francine Reed	
2020	Aladdin	Karma	
upcoming	The Pharm	Nikita	post-production
upcoming	Social Distancing	Natalie Rose	pre-production

=== TV Series ===
TV series
Year	TV Series	Role	Notes
2002	Fastlane	Katiya Federov	Season 1 Episode 3: "Gone Native"
2003	Just Shoot Me!	Hellena	Season 7 Episode 22: "Evaluate This!"
2004-2007	The Bold and the Beautiful	Ava	Recurring
2005	CSI	Svetlana Melton	Season 5 Episode 13: "Nesting Dolls"
2005	NYPD Blue	Elena	Season 12 Episode 19: "Bale to the Chief"
2005	Less than Perfect	Daniella	Season 3 Episode 19: "Claude's Extreme Makeover"
2005	Wanted	Inez	Season 1 Episode 2: "The Wild Bunch"
2006	Nip/Tuck	Analise	Season 4 Episode 4: "Shari Noble"
2007	The Unit	Russian Girl	Season 2 Episode 21: "Bedfellows"
2007	Entourage	Anika	Season 4 Episode 4: "Sorry, Harvey"
2007	American Heiress	Drunk girl	Recurring
2008	My Own Worst Enemy	Stewardess	Season 1 Episode 5: "The Night Train to Moscow"
2010	Important Things with Demetri Martin	Natasha	Recurring
2010	True Blood	Yvetta	Recurring
2012	Resident Evil 6	Helena Harper (facial model)	
2013	Body of Proof	Tatyana	Season 3 Episode 6: "Fallen Angel"
2013	NCIS: Los Angeles	Veronica Pisconov	Recurring
2016	It's Always Sunny in Philadelphia	Tatiana	Season 11 Episode 3: "The Gang Hits the Slopes"
