= Paul DeSimone =

American bodybuilder

Paul DeSimone is a Boston-based bodybuilder and filmmaker.

DeSimone began weight training in 1994. In 1999, he won the AAU Teen Mr. Massachusetts tournament and placed fourth tin the Teen Mr. America tournament. In other competitions, he placed third in the 2005 NPC Tournament of Champions, second in the NPC Mr. Massachusetts tournament, and thirteenth in the New England Bodybuilding, Fitness & Figure Championships.

Paul is a champion caliber trainer who trains female, and male athletes out of the gym warriors in Peabody Massachusetts the gym he owns. Some of these woman are ranked in the top 100 best female lifters in the USA.

DeSimone produced and directed two documentaries that followed his bodybuilding training regimen, The Underground Lifting Video (2003) and The Gym Warrior Video (2005). He has produced, directed and acted in several films, commercials and movies, titles like “5 Swords of Emperors” “pine st”, “Furry Vengeance”, and nominated for best short series by IMDb for “pine st” DeSimone also appeared in the 2005 independent comedy Land of College Prophets and was a celebrity endorser for Pro-Wrist Straps gym equipment. He owns and operates a gym in Peabody, Massachusetts. Paul lives with his mother in Danvers, MA.
