= Shadow Puppets (film) =

- Starring: Jolene Blalock; Tony Todd; James Marsters; Marc Winnick; Natasha Alam
- Release date: 2007
- Running time: 103 minutes
- Country: United States
- Language: English

Shadow Puppets is a 2007 horror film directed by Michael Winnick.

== Plot ==
Eight strangers with no memories who find themselves trapped in an abandoned facility. As they desperately try to find answers and escape, a menacing shadow attempts to have them killed.

== Cast ==
- Jolene Blalock as Kate Adams
- Tony Todd as Steve Garrett
- James Marsters as Jack Dillon
- Marc Winnick as Charlie
- Natasha Alam as Amber Diane McCormik
- Diahnna Nicole Baxter as Stacey Gibson
- Richard Whiten as Dave
- Jennie Ford as Melissa Tucker

== Release ==
The film was released in June 2007.
