= Doug E. Doug =

American actor (born 1970)

- Born: Douglas Bourne; January 7, 1970 (age 56); Brooklyn, New York, U.S.
- Occupation: Actor
- Years active: 1990–present

Doug E. Doug (born Douglas Bourne; January 7, 1970) is an American actor. He started his career at age 17 as a stand-up comedian. He played the role of Griffin Vesey on the CBS sitcom Cosby, Sanka Coffie in the film Cool Runnings, and the voice of Bernie in the animated film Shark Tale.

== Early life ==
Douglas Bourne was born in Brooklyn, New York, to a Jamaican father and African-American mother.

== Career ==
Doug has appeared in a number of films, including Jungle Fever (1991), Hangin' with the Homeboys (1991), Class Act (1992), Cool Runnings (1993), Operation Dumbo Drop (1995), the remake of Disney's That Darn Cat (1997), and Eight Legged Freaks (2002). He was the star of his own short-lived ABC sitcom, Where I Live, a show which won the acclaim of Bill Cosby, and subsequently played Hilton Lucas's boarder and surrogate son Griffin Vesey on Cosby. In 2004, he had a voice role in the animated feature Shark Tale, and also appeared on two episodes of Law & Order: Special Victims Unit (2004, 2012).

=== Professional career ===
Doug E. Doug started off his career as a stand-up comic at the age of 17. He was first seen at the Apollo Theater by Russell Simmons, who then asked Doug to write and host a syndicated late-night program Simmons produced called The New Music Report. His entrance into film began when he spoke one line in Spike Lee's film Mo' Better Blues.

Doug is known to movie viewers for his starring role, as the spirited pushcart driver, turned bobsled racer, in Cool Runnings. (This movie is loosely based on the true story, of the first Jamaica national bobsled team, trying to qualify for the Winter Olympics.)

Doug is also known for his roles as the ne'er-do-well Willie Stevens, in Hangin' with the Homeboys; for this role, he received an Independent Spirit Award nomination for Best Actor; he played a class comedian in Class Act; as a soldier, enlisted for unusual duty, in Operation Dumbo Drop; an ill-fated high school student in the horror epic Dr. Giggles; and as an FBI agent in the 1997 remake of "That Darn Cat". In the Warner Bros. science fiction comedy Eight Legged Freaks, he portrayed a paranoid small-town radio host with visions of an alien invasion. In the animated DreamWorks film, Shark Tale, he voiced the jellyfish character Bernie.

In television, Doug starred in the ABC series Where I Live, a show developed around his own life, for which he served as co-producer. In that series, he voiced a quirky teenager Douglas Saint Martin, growing up in a working-class Caribbean family in New York. He also co-hosted the VH-1 series Rock of Ages, and spent four seasons starring as Griffin, in the television series Cosby. On the Nickelodeon animated show Little Bill, he voiced Percy, the pet store owner. He also guest-starred, in Touched by an Angel, Law and Order: SVU, and NBC's Conviction.

In theater, Doug starred in the musical Purlie, which ran briefly in March and April of 2005.

Doug made his debut as a director/producer with the screenplay Citizen James, in which he also co-wrote and starred in. Citizen James aired on Starz Encore/ BET Movies.

Doug launched a new YouTube comedy-channel series, The Doug Life Show in late 2012, as part of The Comedy Shaq Network. It is a series of skit comedy and commentaries, very loosely based around the experiences, thoughts, and real life of Doug, which sometimes features his cousin (Sasikumar Ramakrishnan)) with his zany adventures in Kampung Rawa.

He starred in the 2015 movie An Act of War.

== Filmography ==
=== Film ===
Year	Title	Role	Notes
1990	Mo' Better Blues	Jimmy the Busboy	
1991	Hangin' with the Homeboys	Willie Stevens	
1991	Jungle Fever	Friend of Livin' Large	
1992	Class Act	Popsicle	
1992	Dr. Giggles	Trotter	
1993	Cool Runnings	Sanka Coffie	
1995	Operation Dumbo Drop	Sp4 Harvey (H.A.) Ashford	
1997	That Darn Cat	Agent Zeke Kelso	
1998	Rusty: A Dog's Tale	Turbo the Turtle (Voice)	
2000	Everything's Jake	Taxi Driver	
2000	Citizen James	James	
2002	Eight Legged Freaks	Harlan Griffith	
2004	Shark Tale	Bernie (voice)	
2005	Club Oscar	Bernie (voice)	Short
2006	Wyclef Jean in America	Nicky Lolo	TV movie
2010	Snowmen	Leonard Garvey	
2010	What the F*ck Doug E. Doug?	Himself	Short
2011	A Novel Romance	Barry Humfries	
2011	Sesame Street: Bye-Bye, Pacifier! Big Kid Stories with Elmo	Barber	Video
2011	Detachment	Mr. Norris	
2011	Chagrin	Karl Brubaker	Short
2014	In the Future Love Will Also	(Voice)	Short
2015	An Act of War	Marlon	
2015	The Wannabe	The Twin	
2015	2nd Life	Madou Dosama	Short
2016	Muddy Corman	Karl Brubaker	
2017	Lil Girlgone	Terrence Clash	
2022	In the Weeds	Larry	

=== Television ===
Year	Title	Role	Notes
1993	Where I Live	Douglas St. Martin	Main Cast
1996–2000	Cosby	Griffin Vesey	Main Cast
1997	Diagnosis: Murder	Himself	Episode: "Must Kill TV"
2000	Happily Ever After: Fairy Tales for Every Child	Raven (voice)	Episode: "The Snow Queen"
2000	Touched by an Angel	Ronnie Billings	Episode: "Monica's Bad Day"
2000–02	Little Bill	Percy Mulch (voice)	Guest Cast: Season 1-3
2004	Law & Order: Special Victims Unit	Rudy Lemcke	Episode: "Criminal"
2006	Conviction	Toby Janes	Episode: "Pilot"
2007	My Gym Partner's a Monkey	Bear (voice)	Episode: "Mongoosed/Mellow Fellows"
2010	Law & Order	Michael Reed	Episode: "Immortal"
2010	Justified	Israel Fandi	Recurring Cast: Season 1
2011	Bar Karma	Chris	Episode: "Three Times a Lady"
2012	Law & Order: Special Victims Unit	Mr. Wiggins	Episode: "Acceptable Loss"
2014	Blue Bloods	Lamar Roberts	Episode: "Unfinished Business"
2015	Above Average Presents	Schaeffer	Episode: "Steel Whiplash (Whiplash Parody)"
2016	Brown Nation	Lemont	Main Cast

== Award nominations ==
Year	Award	Result	Category	Film or series
1992	Independent Spirit Awards	Nominated	Best Male Lead	Hangin' with the Homeboys
1998	NAACP Image Awards	Nominated	Outstanding Supporting Actor in a Comedy Series	Cosby
1999	NAACP Image Awards	Nominated	Outstanding Supporting Actor in a Comedy Series	Cosby
2000	NAACP Image Awards	Nominated	Outstanding Supporting Actor in a Comedy Series	Cosby
1994	Young Artist Award	Nominated	Best Youth Comedian	Where I Live
