= Bill Sorvino =

American stage and screen actor

- Born: February 15
- Occupation(s): Actor, writer, producer
- Years active: 1999–present

Bill Sorvino (born February 15) is an American stage and screen actor, writer and producer. He attended William Esper Studio. Sorvino's acting has been recognized on regional and national levels. Most Notably the Accolade Global Film Competition Named one of 50 most influential people in Hudson County by the Hudson Reporter in 2012 and 2013. He is also the founder of the Golden Door International Film Festival in Jersey City.

== Filmography ==
Year	Film	Actor	Writer	Producer	Notes
2018	Who's Jenna...?	✓	✗	✗	Feature Film
2017	Steps	✓	✗	✗	Feature Film
2016	Confidence Game	✓	✗	✗	Feature Film
2016	Mommy's Box	✓	✗	✗	Feature Film
2015–2016	Inside Hollywood on the Hudson	✗	✓	✓	TV series
2014	A Place for Heroes	✓	✗	✗	Feature Film
2014	Dangerous Games	✓	✗	✗	Short Film
2013	Maniac	✓	✗	✗	Short Film
2012	Pollination*	✓	✓	✗	Short Film
2012	The Trouble with Cali	✓	✗	✗	Feature Film
2011	Night Club	✓	✗	✗	Feature Movie
2009	The Art of Money	✓	✓	✓	Short Film
2008	Quantum Heaven	✓	✓	✓	Short Film
1999	That Championship Season	✓	✗	✗	Television film
