= Palace Theatre (Syracuse, New York) =

Historic movie palace in Syracuse, New York

Coordinates: 43°4′7″N 76°6′47″W

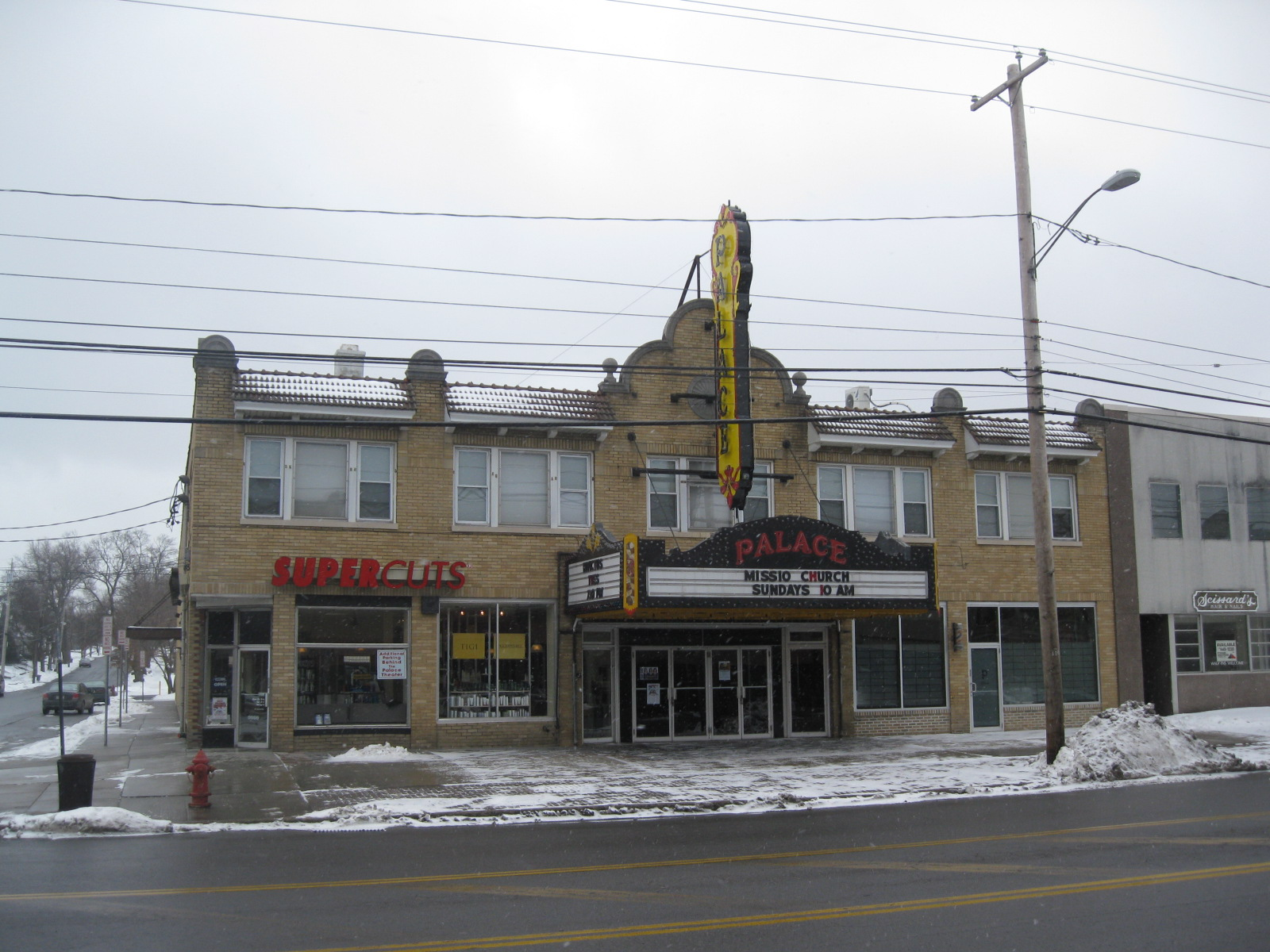
- Palace Theatre, Eastwood
- Interactive map of Palace Theatre
- Address: James Street, Eastwood, Syracuse, New York
- Location: United States
- Owner: DiBella family
- Capacity: 1,300
- Type: Movie palace

Construction
- Opened: 1922
- Renovated: 2004

The Palace Theatre is a historic movie palace located in the Eastwood neighborhood of Syracuse, New York, United States. Built in 1922, it has been continuously operated by the same family for over 80 years.

== History ==
The Palace Theatre was commissioned by local businessman Alfred DiBella and opened in 1922. The original design featured 1,300 seats and included a second-floor dining and dance ballroom.

Following DiBella's death in 1959, ownership passed to his daughter, Frances DiBella. She managed the theatre for more than fifty years, often working at the cash register or popcorn counter. After her death on April 26, 2004, her nephew Michael Heagerty took over operations and initiated an extensive renovation project. Upgrades included a digital high-definition video system, Dolby Surround Sound, and presentation equipment capable of displaying large-scale computer graphics. A café was also opened adjacent to the theatre, although it has since closed.

The theatre reopened after renovations in 2004 but faced a temporary setback due to flooding. Since then, it has hosted a variety of events, including film screenings, concerts, lectures, community gatherings, and private functions. In 2005, Syracuse Mayor Matthew Driscoll delivered his "State of the City" address at the Palace. It is also home to the annual B-Movie Film Festival, which attracts visitors from around the world.

Throughout its history, the Palace Theatre has remained independently owned and operated. It is one of three independent cinemas in the Syracuse area, along with the Hollywood Theatre in Mattydale and the Manlius Art Cinema in Manlius.
