= Russ Russo =

American film actor (born 1985)

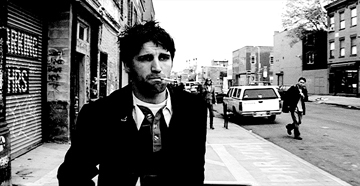
- Russ Russo in Williamsburg
- Born: Russell Arthur Benson Jr; December 2, 1985 (age 40); Gloucester, Massachusetts, U.S.
- Other name: Russell Russo
- Occupation: Actor
- Years active: 1999–present
- Website: russrusso.com

Russ Russo (born December 2, 1985) is an American film actor. His works include Catch Hell, Williamsburg, and the thriller An Act of War.

== Early life ==
Russo was born in Gloucester, Massachusetts. However, he was quickly uprooted and spent the majority of his childhood moving around between California, New York, Arizona and New Jersey with his family. Though moving was difficult, Russo saw each new city as an opportunity to reinvent himself. Having lived in such a vast array of locations, he quickly realized that different personalities were needed for different schools, and so he relied on his ability to act in order to survive in every new social situation. Influenced by Robert Frost and William Blake, Russo began writing his own poetry and found he had a great appreciation for music as well, attracted to bands such as The Doors. However, it was not until he started reading Shakespeare in high school that his attraction to the arts mixed with his ability to act. He began acting in local Shakespearean plays during his teen years and idolizing actors such as Marlon Brando.

== Career ==
In February 1999, Russo began an internship at the Jewelbox Theatre. Jade Greene, the director of the theatre, was offering internships for acting classes. In the months to follow, he studied Alexander, Meisner, Stella Adler, Lee Strasberg and Method acting. Russo worked as a utility actor in various plays during the internship before landing a lead role in Clifford Odet's classic "Awake & Sing" playing Moe Axelrod, a role previously performed by Sanford Meisner. Russo began traveling to NYC to study at Tisch in various acting workshops, as well as working with the NJ Theatre Exchange. In March 2002, he landed the lead role in the Independent film "Envy" portraying a character with multiple personality disorder. "Envy" won the Buzz award at the NY Independent Film Festival.

Russo is known as a working Los Angeles and New York City actor ranging from art house short projects to off-Broadway theater to Independent film. Russo gained a reputation in the New York acting community as a rogue actor who dissolves into each role specifically to adhere to the character. After working for several years in stage and on film, The 2005 Indie Movie Awards saw him nominated for "Best Supporting Actor" for his role as Irish 'Jonah Joe' in the cult Indie hit Land of College Prophets. Russo had done a few films by 2006, most notably Williamsburg in which he received great reviews. As quoted on Film Threat, "Fortunately, the able cast brings their characters to life and provide a memorable tapestry of lives on the artistic fringes. Best here are Russ Russo as a chain-smoking painter selling his art on the sidewalk while he seems to cough and choke himself into a slow death.....All told, Williamsburg is an impressive and memorable achievement." According to Together, "Russ Russo then won 'Best Actor' at the 1st annual Wine & Country Film Festival at Marth Clara Vineyards for his role in the Feature film Williamsburg.......with a 4 Star review by the New York Times." Russo was named Film Threat Magazine's "Indie Actor to Watch" in 2006.

"Russo is predictably great, with a Top notch Russian accent" – Mike Watt, Indiewire.com Russ Russo as Volgo the Red in London Betty

In 2009, he had three projects in production and one in development including the independent feature film Into the Darkness starring alongside New Moon and Eclipse actor Kiowa Gordon.

In 2013, Russo played the role Tim Remmitt in the movie Catch Hell. He starred in the 2015 movie An Act of War.

== Filmography ==
| Year | Film | Role | Notes |
|---|---|---|---|
| 2005 | Land of College Prophets | Jonah Joe | |
| 2006 | Williamsburg | Brother James | |
| 2006 | Shift | Doug | Short |
| 2006 | Reenactment of the Century | Ron Goldman | Short |
| 2007 | A New Wave | Julio Cortez | |
| 2008 | 10,000 A.D.: The Legend of a Black Pearl | Fari | Video |
| 2009 | London Betty | Volgo | |
| 2009 | The Children of Fleeting Light | Christian | |
| 2010 | Throws of Passion | Wallace Morris | |
| 2014 | Catch Hell | Tim | |
| 2015 | An Act of War | Jacob Nicks | |
| 2017 | Bad Frank | Niko Scarpezzi | |
| TBA | Into the Darkness | Wes | |
