= An Act of War =

- Directed by: Ryan M. Kennedy
- Written by: Ryan M. Kennedy
- Produced by: Atit Shah
- Starring: Russ Russo; Natasha Alam; Doug E. Doug; Joseph R. Gannascoli; Robert Miano; Chris LaPanta; Dominik Tiefenthaler; Kevin Interdonato
- Cinematography: Nicolas Canton
- Production companies: Create Entertainment; Evince Productions; Out in Front, Inc. (In association with)
- Distributed by: Netflix
- Release date: March 31, 2015
- Running time: 99 minutes
- Country: United States
- Language: English

An Act of War (original title: The Projectionist) is a 2015 American thriller film written and directed by Ryan M. Kennedy and produced by Atit Shah. The film stars Russ Russo, Natasha Alam, Doug E. Doug, Joseph R. Gannascoli, Robert Miano and Kiowa Gordon. The story follows a recently returned veteran who tries to put his life back together, but is drawn to deeds that may be more dangerous than his tour of duty.

February, 2014, Indiewire and Collider reported that the project was the first film to ever release on Kickstarter prior to a theatrical and Video on Demand run. The film was released in North American markets on VOD March 31, 2015 and on Netflix in July, 2015.

== Cast ==
- Russ Russo as Jacob Nicks
- Natasha Alam as Ivana
- Doug E. Doug as Marlon
- Joseph R. Gannascoli as Frank
- Robert Miano as Sully
- Chris LaPanta as Lt. Sullivan
- Dominik Tiefenthaler as Det. Nicks
- Kevin Interdonato as The Stalker
- Kiowa Gordon as Private. Locklear

== Production ==
=== Development ===
Ryan M. Kennedy directed the film from a script he spent two years developing while working full-time as a waiter at a Midtown Manhattan restaurant. He showed the finished draft to a French cinematographer Nicolas Canton living in New York City and the two began planning to produce the film with a small sum of their own money. After receiving a copy of the script in January 2011, a local producer, Atit Shah offered to partner with Kennedy and the two began to work on expanding the scope of the project.

=== Casting ===
Shortly after securing the rights to the script, Shah sent the screenplay over to actor Russ Russo, whom Shah had met several years prior at the Cannes Film Festival. The production signed Russo in February 2011. Casting Director Rita Powers round out the remaining cast with Natasha Alam, Doug E. Doug, Joseph R. Gannascoli, Robert Miano, and Kiowa Gordon.

=== Filming ===
Principal photography took place in March 2011, in New York City, predominantly in Brooklyn's Vinegar Hill and East Williamsburg neighborhoods.

Kennedy had rented a production space in Brooklyn prior to meeting Shah, an expense Shah felt was unnecessary. Unable to break the lease, production designer Robert Dancy converted the raw space into two different key locations within the movie and the space proved to be a big win for production.

The film was shot on the Arri Alexa over a period of 32 days. Additional filming took place in various locations around Manhattan, and in upstate NY near Red Hook.

== Release and reception ==
The film was released on Video on Demand and DVD March 31, 2015 and on Netflix July 15, 2015.

An Act of War received generally favorable reviews. Aaron Peterson of The Hollywood Outsider wrote, “a harrowing journey of a film that demands to be seen”. Henrick Vartanian of Brave New Hollywood praised the film's depiction of soldiers with posttraumatic stress disorder writing, “this film makes the complexity of the tormented soldier comprehensible to everyday public”.

The Movie Waffler reported, "An Act of War is skillfully scripted and sensitively acted. Prior to its release, the picture won four film festival awards including Best Picture, Best Director and Best Actor at the New York-based Take Two Film Festival.

The movie was hailed by Indiewire and Collider as the first film to ever have a limited release using Kickstarter prior to more mainstream film distribution".
