= B-Movie Film Festival =

Annual film festival in Syracuse, USA

Coordinates: 43°4′7″N 76°6′47″W

The Scare-A-Con Film Festival (formerly the B-Movie Film Festival) is an annual film festival held in Syracuse, United States.

The festival was founded in 1999 by local filmmaker Ron Bonk to promote the art of B-movie making. It was canceled in its third year due to the effects of the September 11 attacks. It then existed primarily online or as a much smaller event for several years (during which it was profiled by The Wall Street Journal) and only restarted as a live event at the Palace Theatre in 2005.

Many of the films entered are made on minimal budgets. Screenings can feature full-length films, documentaries, and shorts. Various genres are included, and selected films are usually reviewed for possible distribution. The festival defines a B-movie as "a production whose entertainment and artistic value exceeds the limitations of its budget." The festival's "Killer B" or "Tor" awards are sought after and prominently displayed by the winners. One film maker described being nominated for a B-Movie Film Festival award "like heaven to the world of independent filmmaking". It averages a B in reviews.

== Awards ==
"Killer B" awards are given out in Best Picture, Best Actor, Best Actress, Best Director, Best Foreign Film and other categories. A B-Movie is defined as "a low-budget film which provides a level of entertainment and/or artistic value which rivals or surpasses big-budget mainstream pictures." Feature films, documentaries and short subjects are open for consideration.

=== 1999 ===
Razor Blade Smile won awards for Best B-Movie, Best Actress (Eileen Daly), Best Cinematography (Jim Solan), Best Director (Jake West), and Best Special Effects. Other awards were Best Actor to Scott McCord (Motel), Best Supporting Actress to Verda Bridges (Color-Blinded), and Best Supporting Actor to Robert Margolis (Criminals).

=== 2000 ===
Hosted by B-movie star Roxanne Michaels. I Woke Up Early the Day I Died a 'dialogue-free comedy' based on an unproduced Ed Wood screenplay, won Best Picture, Best Cinematography, Best Set Design, Best Director (Aris Iliopolous), Best Actor (Billy Zane), and Best Star Cameo (Christina Ricci). Other awards were Best Actress to Karin Viard for The New Eve, Best Screenplay, for Pep Squad, by Steve Balderson, and Best Documentary for Memories of the Soil.

=== 2001 ===
The ceremony was scheduled for September at the Westcott Movie Theater, Syracuse, New York, but canceled due to the September 11 attacks. The awards had been voted on before the attacks, and were announced October 31, 2001. Best B-Movie and Best Director were both tied between Lethal Force, a martial arts film directed by Alvin Ecarma and Scrapbook, a thriller directed by Eric Stanze. Scrapbook won Best Screenplay and Best B-Movie Villain, both for Tommy Biondo, who died before the awards were voted on. Lethal Force won Best Cinematography and Best Action Sequence. Neil Maffin won Best Actor for A Moment in Time and Lorri Bagley won Best Actress for Peroxide Passion. Mike Legge won Best Supporting Actor for Curtains and Paulina Gálvez won named Best Supporting Actress for Tatawo, which also won Best Foreign Film Award (Spain). Aliens of the Sea won Best Documentary, Third World Cop Best Musical Score, Beware Best Editing, Cremains Best Set Design, Biohazardous Best Make-up, Creatures of the Mist Best Special Effects, Bucky McSnead Best Short Subject and Ornaments Best Animated Short.

=== 2002 ===
Held October 5-October 6 at the Planet 505 Club in Syracuse, New York. Jane White Is Sick & Twisted won Best B-Movie, Best Director (David Michael Latt), and Best B-Movie Hollywood Appearance/Cameo (Colin Mochrie). The winner of Best Actor was Michael Emanuel for Lucky, Best Actress Andrea Ajemian for Rutland, USA, Best Supporting Actor Graeme Anning for P.O.V, Best Supporting Actress Lara Clancy for Summer Rain. Hunting Humans won Best Editing and Best Action Sequences. Best Writer was Stephen Sustarsic for Lucky. There was a Special Achievement Winner: Young Man Kang for 1st Testament CIA Vengeance

=== 2004 ===
Prison-a-Go-Go, a parody of women in prison films, won Best B-Movie, Best Director (Barak Epstein), Best Actress (Rhonda Shear), and Best Set Design. The Passage won Best Actor (Greg Dow), and Best Screenplay Award for Daniel Casey-Vanhout. Ambition Withdraw won Best Documentary and Best Music Score, and Head Hunter won Best Make-up and Special Effects. The Last Round won Best B-Movie Short, and Beer Muscles won the B-Movie Merit Award.

=== 2005 ===
Held April 8-April 14 at the Palace Movie Theater, in Syracuse, New York. Land of College Prophets, a fantasy comedy, won Best Picture, Best Actor (Thomas Edward Seymour), Best Cinematography, and Best Make-up Effects. Best Director was shared by four people, Thomas Edward Seymour, Mike Aransky and Phil Guerette jointly for Land of College Prophets, and Elza Kephart for Graveyard Alive, which also won for Best Editing. And I Lived won for Best Supporting Actor (Josue Rivera), and Best Music Score (Matt Tyson and Gary Judge). Maggie Ross won Best Actress for Rock and Roll Eulogy, and Debbie Rochon won Best Supporting Actress for Scream of the Decapitated. Michael Legge won Best Screenplay for Democrazy. Phil Hall received a Special Achievement Award for his work supporting independent film as a publicist and film writer.

=== 2006 ===
The 2006 guest of honor was B-movie star Michael Berryman. Drama Big Fish in Middlesex, won "Tor" Awards for Best B-Movie, Best B-Movie Writer (Jonathan Straiton), Best Supporting Actor (Michael Wingfield) and Best Music Score. Science fiction film Borrowing Time, won Best Director (Webster Crowell), Best Editing, Best Set Design, and Best Digital / Special Effects. Jackie Parker (actress)|Jackie Parker won Best Actress for Both. Ray Wise won Best Actor for Cyxork 7. Ellektra won "Best Foreign B-Movie" (Belgium), Best Supporting Actress (Axelle Red). Flyaway won Best Animated Short, Pawns of Paradise won Best Documentary, Bon Appetit won Best Short, The Last Eve won Best Cinematography, Big Foot won Best Make-Up.
