= List of accolades received by Rohit Gupta =

Rohit Gupta awards and nominations
Awards and nominations
Award	Wins	Nominations

Totals (Note: Certain award groups do not simply award one winner. They acknowledge several different recipients, have runners-up, and have third place. Since this is a specific recognition and is different from losing an award, runner-up mentions are considered wins in this award tally. For simplification and to avoid errors, each award in this list has been presumed to have had a prior nomination.)
- Wins: 50
- Nominations: 30

This is a list of awards and nominations received by filmmaker Rohit Gupta.

== Awards and nominations ==
Year	Title	Festival/Award	Category	Outcome
2009	Another Day Another Life	Accolade Film Awards, USA	Award of Merit for Direction	Won
2009	Another Day Another Life	Accolade Film Awards, USA	Award of Merit for Short Film	Won
2009	Another Day Another Life	Accolade Film Awards, USA	Award of Merit for Dramatic Impact	Won
2009	Another Day Another Life	Carnegie Mellon University; 16th Annual Film Competition aka Rack Focus	Best Short	Nominated
2009	Another Day Another Life	Swansea Bay Film Festival, U.K.	Best first film	Won
2009	Another Day Another Life	International Film Festival Ireland	Best film under 45 minutes	Won
2009	Another Day Another Life	International Film Festival Thailand	Best first film	Won
2009	Another Day Another Life	Hoboken International Film Awards, USA	Best Narrative short film	Nominated
2009	Another Day Another Life	Urban Suburban International Film Festival, USA	Best film under 6 minutes	Nominated
2009	Another Day Another Life	International Film Festival South Africa	Best first film	Nominated
2010	Another Day Another Life	Canada International Film Festival	Best Experimental film	Won
2010	Life! Camera Action...	Indie Fest, USA	Award of Merit for Best feature film	Won
2010	Life! Camera Action...	Accolade Film Awards	Award of Excellence for Best Feature Film	Won
2010	Life! Camera Action...	Accolade Film Awards	Award of Merit for Direction	Won
2010	Life! Camera Action...	Accolade Film Awards	Award of Merit for Cinematography	Won
2010	Life! Camera Action...	Accolade Film Awards	Award of Merit for Dramatic Impact	Won
2011	Another Day Another Life	Silicon Valley Film Festival, Seattle	Innovation & Entrepreneurship Award	Nominated
2011	Another Day Another Life	Brownfish Shorts Films Festival, NYC	Best Short Narrative film	Nominated
2011	Another Day Another Life	Oregon Film Awards, USA	Best Narrative short film	Won
2011	Another Day Another Life	ONECLOUDFEST (First film festival @ Facebook), Sweden	Best Narrative film	Nominated
2011	Another Day Another Life	Golden Door Film Festival of Jersey City, USA	Best Short Short film	Nominated
2011	Another Day Another Life	Golden Door Film Festival of Jersey City, USA	Best Director	Nominated
2011	Another Day Another Life	Golden Door Film Festival of Jersey City, USA	Best Jersey City film	Nominated
2011	Another Day Another Life	Best Shorts Film Competition, USA	Best Short film	Won
2011	Another Day Another Life	Best Shorts Film Competition, USA	Best Dramatic impact	Won
2011	Another Day Another Life	Costa Rica International Film Festival	Best of the Best short film	Nominated
2011	Another Day Another Life	World Music & Independent Film Festival, USA	Best Cinematography shared with Carlos Deuringer	Nominated
2011	Another Day Another Life	Box[ur] Shorts Films Festival, Los Angeles, USA	Best Killer Short	Nominated
2011	Life! Camera Action...	Los Angeles Movie Awards	Award of Excellence for Best Experimental Film	Won
2011	Life! Camera Action...	Bayou City Inspirational International Film Festival, USA	Honorable Mention Award in feature film competition	Won
2011	Life! Camera Action...	Silent River Film Festival, USA	River Pursuit Award for Best film	Won
2011	Life! Camera Action...	Silent River Film Festival, USA	River Amulet Award for Best Director	Won
2011	Life! Camera Action...	Swansea Bay Film Festival, UK	Best feature film - North America	Won
2011	Life! Camera Action...	California Film Awards	Orson Welles Award for Best Narrative film	Won
2011	Life! Camera Action...	Action on Film International Film Festival, USA	Best Art Direction shared with Ravi Kumar R.	Nominated
2011	Life! Camera Action...	Golden Door Film Festival of Jersey City	Best feature film	Nominated
2011	Life! Camera Action...	Golden Door Film Festival of Jersey City	Best Director	Nominated
2011	Life! Camera Action...	Oregon Film Awards	Grand Jury Choice Award for Best film	Won
2011	Life! Camera Action...	Barossa International Film Festival, South Australia	Best International feature film	Nominated
2011	Life! Camera Action...	International Film Festival Ireland	Best American feature	Nominated
2011	Life! Camera Action...	International Film Festival of World Cinema, United Kingdom	Best film of the festival	Nominated
2011	Life! Camera Action...	International Film Festival of World Cinema, United Kingdom	Best Director	Nominated
2011	Life! Camera Action...	Nevada International Film Festival	Platinum Reel Award for Best Narrative Feature Film	Won
2011	Life! Camera Action...	Toronto Independent Film & Video Awards, Canada	Best Experimental film	Nominated
2011	Life! Camera Action...	World Music & Independent Film Festival, USA	Best Drama	Nominated
2011	Life! Camera Action...	World Music & Independent Film Festival, USA	Best Director	Nominated
2011	Life! Camera Action...	World Music & Independent Film Festival, USA	Best Screenplay shared with Amanda Sodhi	Nominated
2011	Life! Camera Action...	Yosemite International Film Awards, California	Grand Jury Choice Award for Best film	Won
2012	Another Day Another Life	HMIFF, USA	Best film of the festival under 30 minutes	Won
2012	Another Day Another Life	17th Indie Gathering International Film Festival, USA	Suspense thriller micro film	Won
2012	Another Day Another Life	28th Goldie film Awards, USA; Special Board of Director's Grand Goldie Award	Best Narrative short film	Won
2012	Another Day Another Life	Appalachian Film Festival, USA	Best micro film	Nominated
2012	Just do it!	28th Goldie Film Awards; Special Board of Director's Grand Goldie Award	Best Silent film	Won
2012	Life! Camera Action...	28th Goldie film Awards, USA; Special Board of Director's Grand Goldie Award	Best feature film	Won
2012	Life! Camera Action...	28th Goldie film Awards, USA; Special Board of Director's Grand Goldie Award	Best Director	Won
2012	Life! Camera Action...	28th Goldie film Awards, USA; Special Board of Director's Grand Goldie Award	Best Editing	Won
2012	Life! Camera Action...	28th Goldie film Awards, USA; Special Board of Director's Grand Goldie Award	Best Song (Chalte Jaana hain) shared with Manoj Singh & KK (singer)	Won
2012	Life! Camera Action...	28th Goldie film Awards, USA; Special Board of Director's Grand Goldie Award	Best Screenplay shared with Amanda Sodhi	Won
2012	Life! Camera Action...	28th Goldie film Awards, USA; Special Board of Director's Grand Goldie Award	Best Cinematography shared with Ravi Kumar R.	Won
2012	Life! Camera Action...	28th Goldie film Awards, USA; Special Board of Director's Grand Goldie Award	Best Production Design shared with Ravi Kumar R.	Won
2012	Life! Camera Action...	Prestige Film Awards, USA	Best film for Dramatic Impact	Won
2012	Life! Camera Action...	Prestige Film Awards, USA	Best film for its Originality & Creativity	Won
2012	Life! Camera Action...	HMIFF, USA	Best film of the festival	Won
2012	Life! Camera Action...	HMIFF, USA	Best Director	Nominated
2012	Life! Camera Action...	HMIFF, USA	Best Screenplay shared with Amanda Sodhi	Nominated
2012	Life! Camera Action...	LUFF, USA	Honorable Mention Award: Best feature film	Won
2012	Life! Camera Action...	Carmarthen Bay Film Festival, UK	Best feature film	Nominated
2012	Life! Camera Action...	TWIFF, USA	Best Inspirational family drama film	Won
2012	Life! Camera Action...	IFFPIE aka World Peace Film Festival, Indonesia	Best Newcomer film	Won
2012	Life! Camera Action...	Canada International Film Festival	Royal Reel Award for Best feature film	Won
2015	Midnight Delight	Cannabis Film Festival, USA	Jury Choice Best Film of the Festival shared with Saumin Mehta	Won
2015	Midnight Delight	Oregon Film Awards, USA	Platinum Award - Best Experimental Film shared with Saumin Mehta	Won
2016	Midnight Delight	Accolade Film Awards[	Award of Merit for Feature Film shared with Saumin Mehta	Won
2016	Midnight Delight	Accolade Film Awards[	Award of Recognition for Concept	Won
2016	Midnight Delight	Accolade Film Awards[	Award of Recognition for Direction	Won
2016	Midnight Delight	Accolade Film Awards[	Award of Merit for Humor	Won
2016	Midnight Delight	Camp Cult Classics Film Festival, USA	Classics award shared with Saumin Mehta	Won
2016	Midnight Delight	FAME'US International Film Festival, USA	F.A.M.E.'US feature film award shared with Saumin Mehta	Won
2016	Midnight Delight	iChill International Film Festival, Manila, Philippines	Most Controversial Film	Nominated

== Times NRI of the Year ==
Year	Award	Category	Outcome
2014	Times NRI of the Year	Distinctive Global Achievement in Arts & Entertainment	Nominated

== Limca Book of Records ==
Record	Honoring body
Film Life! Camera Action... was shot by just a two-member crew: director-producer Rohit Gupta and Ravi Kumar R.	Limca Book of Records
