= Angelena Bonet =

Australian model and actress (born 1976)

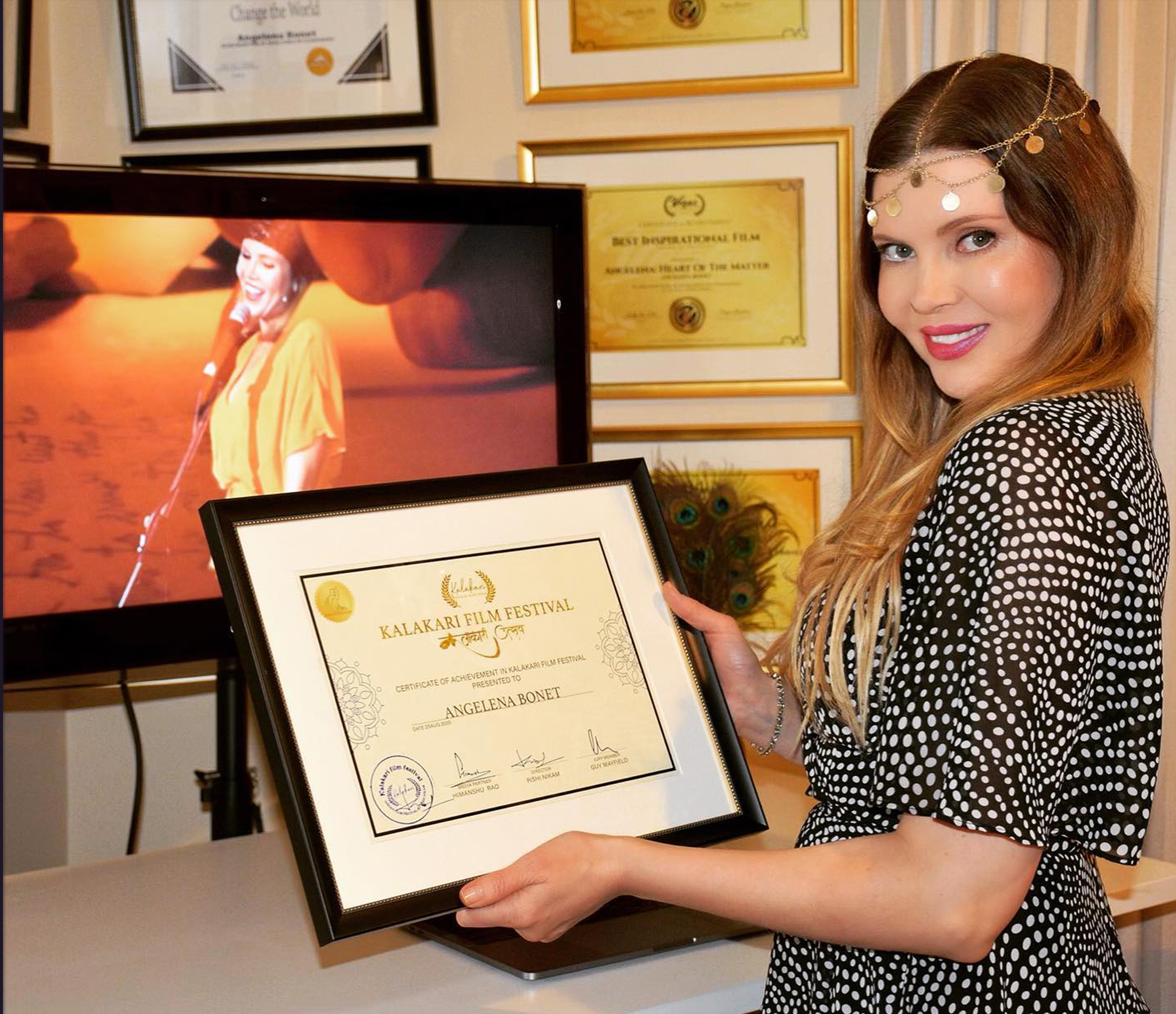
- Bonet in 2021
- Born: Elena Louise Bennett; 13 May 1976 (age 50); Sydney, Australia
- Occupations: Filmmaker; Singer-songwriter
- Years active: 1994–present
- Partner(s): Erick Deeby (2007)
- Website: angelenabonet.org

Elena Louise Bennett (born May 13, 1976), known professionally as Angelena Bonet, is an Australian model, actress, documentary filmmaker, and singer-songwriter.

== Early life ==
Bonet was born on May 13, 1976 in Sydney, Australia and is the youngest of five children to James Patrick Bennett and Geraldine Louise Bennett, a physiotherapist specializing in children with neurodevelopmental disabilities. She adopted the confirmation name "Angela".

Bonet attended Denistone East Primary School, Marist Sisters' College, Woolwich, then St. Patrick's College, Dundas.

== Career ==
=== Modeling ===
Bonet was discovered at a hair salon in Sydney at the age of 18. She debuted as Elli Bennet as a model for Vogue Australia magazine. Bonet modelled in major cities internationally and at home in Australia, where she was dubbed as an "Australian Supermodel" on Network Ten. She has been featured on the cover of Inside Sport magazine, FHM magazine, and served as a covergirl for the 'Sportsmodel of the Year' issue.

=== Film and television ===
Bonet starred in several film and television productions, including the JAG, Ghostly Encounters, My Husband My Killer, and Breakers, and also played the lead role in Canadian rock band Silverstein's film clip "American Dream". She was the featured host for NBC's AOF International Film Festival series and hosted the 'FIFA World Cup Show' in Canada (2010). She has also served as a judge in the Miss USA and Miss Teen USA Pageants in Vermont (2010), and has been the opener for the talk show The Tonight Show with Jay Leno. Bonet has been featured on Australia's Network Seven Broadcast of The 6th Annual Foxtel AACTA Awards held at The Star, Sydney, Australia.

=== Music ===
During her modelling career, Bonet began venturing into music and collaborated with her then-partner, Erick Deeby. Deeby became mentor to Bonet, and helped develop her sound whilst living in Kings Cross, Sydney. Following the death of Deeby, she moved to be with her family in Orange, NSW and composed the lyrics and melody to the instrumental pieces of music Deeby had written and recorded at his music studio for her. The song featured in her debut documentary film Angelena: Change The World and won 'Best Original Song' at the Indie Fest Film Awards (2017). She later independently released her EP "Tragic Fairytale" and "Angelena: Change The World" (Original Soundtrack Album) under her own Record and Publishing label Crystal Heart Records.

== Personal life ==
Bonet was briefly engaged to her musician/producer partner of five years, Erick Deeby, who died on August 27, 2007. She describes this experience as "soul shattering, but writing the music was cathartic and had a deep healing effect on her heart". She temporarily moved to Orange, NSW, to be with family and grieve.

She later settled in Toronto, Canada in 2010, and is now based in Sydney and Toronto.

Despite her Catholic upbringing, Bonet is a daily yoga and meditation practitioner and cites her beliefs to be more spiritual in nature.

=== Charitable efforts ===
Bonet is an official volunteer blogger for Oxfam Australia and a member of the RAINN Org Speakers Bureau. She has also campaigned for women's rights, particularly through V-Day One Billion and United State of Women. She has served as an ambassador for World Mental Health Day and was a speaker for the RUOK? Day (Suicide Prevention Initiative for teens) in 2013. She has an online journalistic program that interviews women and girls worldwide in an effort to share their stories. In early 2017, Angelena established a non-profit organisation, Crystal Heart Foundation aimed at supporting women and girl survivors of sexual violence and those suffering from post-traumatic stress disorder, whilst raising public awareness and aiding other charities globally.

== Filmography ==
=== Film ===
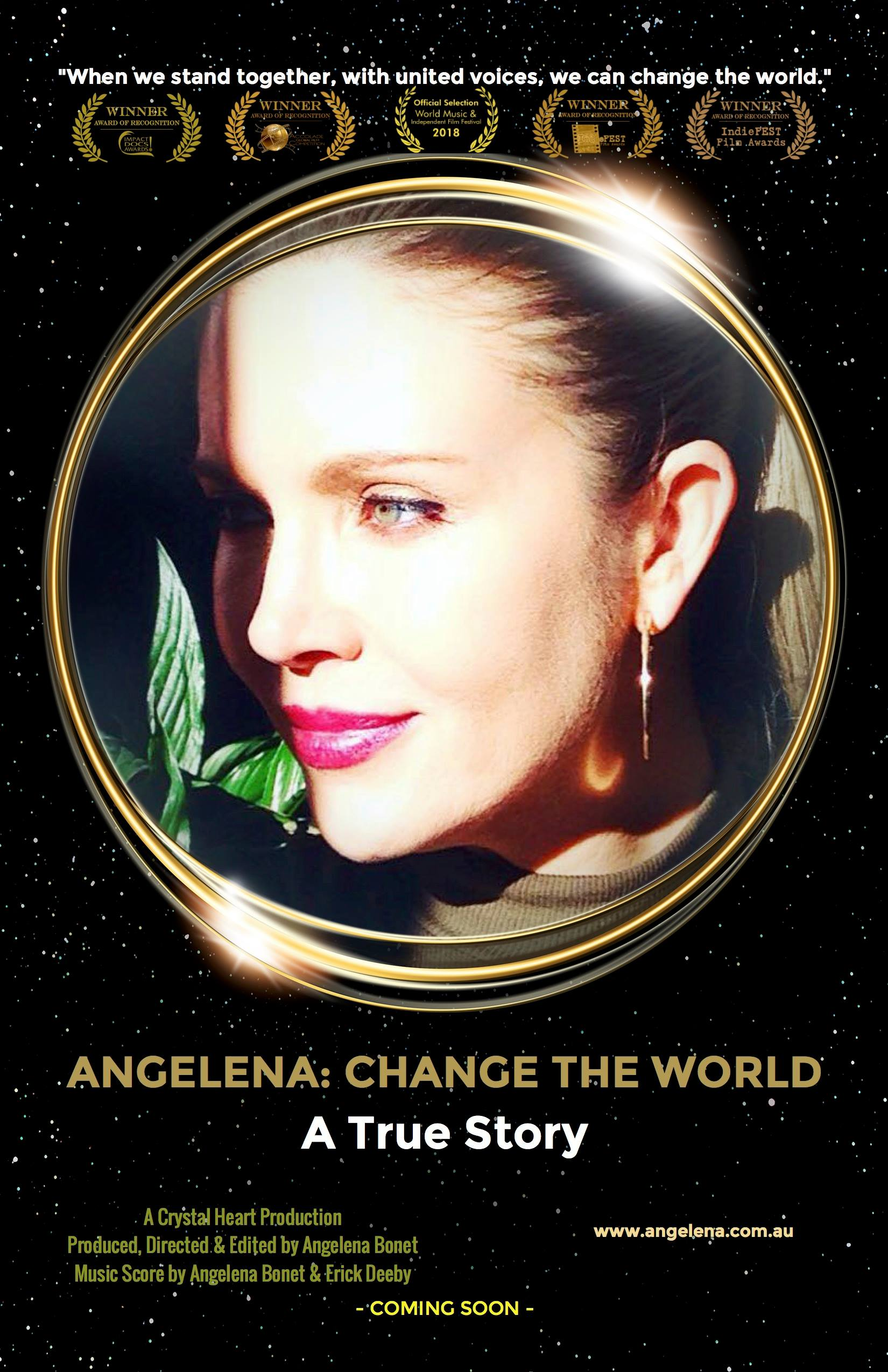
"Angelena: Change The World" Theatrical poster.

Year	Title	Role	Notes
1998	Kiss the Sky	Fantasy Girl No. 1	
2001	My Husband My Killer	Elkin's Girlfriend No. 3	
2017	Angelena: Change The World	Herself	Credited as: Writer, Composer, Producer & director.

=== Television ===
Year	Title	Role	Notes
1997–1999	Breakers	Robyn	10 episodes
1998	JAG	Patron	Episode: "Gypsy Eyes"
2010	Ghostly Encounters	Christina Parker	Episode: "Ghosts and the Vulnerable"
2014	Heart of the Matter	Herself (Composer, Producer & Director)	TV documentary

== Awards and nominations ==
Year	Award	Category	Work	Result
1997	Miss Bondi	Beauty Contest	Modeling	Won
1998	Miss East Coast of Australia	Beauty Contest	Modeling	Won
2017	Impact DOCS Awards	Award of Recognition	Documentary Feature	Won
2017	Accolade Global Film Competition	Award of Recognition	Documentary Feature	Won
2017	IndieFEST Film Awards	Award of Recognition: Liberation / Social Justice / Protest	Documentary Feature	Won
2017	IndieFEST Film Awards	Award of Recognition	Original Song: "Tragic Fairytale" composed by Angelena Bonet & Erick Deeby	Won
2018	World Music & Independent Film Festival	Award of Recognition	Documentary Feature	Nominated
2018	World Music & Independent Film Festival	Award of Recognition	Best Director	Nominated
2018	World Music & Independent Film Festival	Award of Recognition	Best Female Filmmaker	Nominated
