= David E. Aldrich =

American movie producer

David Aldrich
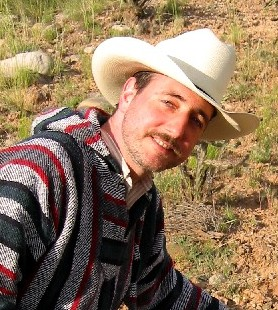
- Aldrich in 2006
- Born: February 8, 1963 (age 63); New York City, U.S.
- Occupation: Information Technology Management
- Website: http://www.peckhammer.com/

David E. Aldrich (born February 8, 1963, in New York) is an American producer, director, cinematographer, editor, and information technology professional. He is best known for his involvement in the development and promotion of new media technology, and for his work in new media production.

== Career ==
=== Educational Technology and Podcasting ===
Aldrich is a University of Washington IT Department Manager connected with the establishment of the first formal educational podcasting service in Washington State, in October 2005. The University of Washington project was also the first fully automated podcasting system used in the educational environment. The goal of automation was to reduce the technology burden for instructors. Aldrich received an Undergraduate Academic Affairs Outstanding Achievement Award in 2006 for his role in podcasting development at the University of Washington.

In April 2007, Aldrich and his development team introduced an automated video screen capture system at the Pack Forest Conference Center, in Eatonville, Washington. The system replicated the automated model of their audio podcasting system, and delivered flash video, screen capture, chapter markers, and sound to students through a Web interface.

=== Web Television and Documentary Production ===
In 2008, Aldrich began producing Peckhammer TV, a web TV documentary series about people who ride and race motorcycles. Aldrich filled a void resulting from the lack of special interest motorcycle programming on Television by creating a motorsport show on the Internet. Forty-two episodes of Peckhammer TV were created between January 2008 and November 2010.

In 2011, he released Randy Parsons: American Luthier, a documentary short about a Seattle guitar-maker whose client list includes Jack White, Jimmy Page, Joe Perry, and many other well-known guitarists. The film premiered at the 2011 ITSA Film Festival, screening at the Historic Sonoma Opera Hall where it won an award for Best Documentary Film. The film aired on KCTS-9's Reel NW series in 2014. It was nominated for an Emmy Award at the 2015 - 52nd Annual Emmy® Nominations in Seattle, Washington.
