= Dipti Mehta =

Indian American actress

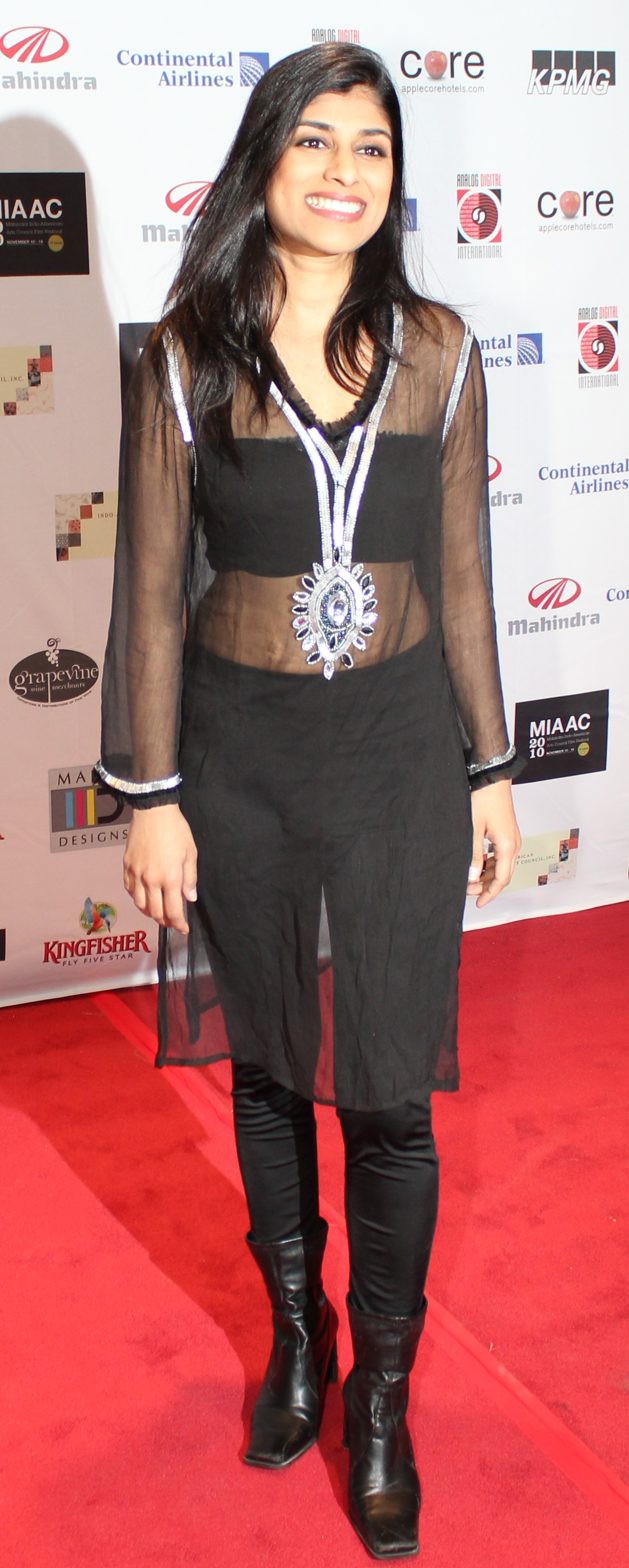
- Mehta at the World Premiere of Life! Camera Action... in New York.
- Born: Dipti Mehta; Ahmedabad, India
- Education: Ph.D in Molecular and cellular biology
- Occupation: Actress
- Website: diptimehta.com

Dipti Mehta is an Indian American actress best known for her portrayal of Reina in Life! Camera Action... bringing her multiple international awards and nominations.

== Early life ==
Mehta was born and raised in Mumbai. Mehta dreamed of being an actor since she was very young. She studied at SKI Jain Girls High School in Marine Lines, Mumbai and went to Wilson College and then to Sophia College for her bachelor's and master's degrees. She majored in Microbiology with Biotechnology as her minor. Mehta has earned a Ph.D. in molecular and cellular biology from the University of Arizona. She acted in plays and various theater projects while attending college. She was a part of a semi-classical dance group in Arizona. She got training in Bharatanatyam and Kathak dance forms while getting her doctoral degree.

She has worked as a radio jockey on the FM station of All India Radio hosting music shows in Hindi and English. She has also appeared in Hindi TV shows and Bollywood films.

== Acting career ==
Mehta started her acting career on stage with Gujarati plays and moved on to becoming a regularly heard voice on All India Radio with the FM section of Mumbai. This launched her into the world of hosting live and recorded events. She then starred in the TV serial Hum Tum on Zee Next as the fashion designer Anjali. She also hosted a yoga show "Arogya Sampada" on Zee International. She auditioned for the Gujarati series of the yoga show then continuing to be a co-host on Hindi show Yoga for You for Zee International. In all she recorded 450 episodes for Zee International. Before starring in Life! Camera Action... Mehta did cameos in a few Bollywood films. In an interview Mehta revealed that In an informal meeting before the audition for Life! Camera Action..., director Rohit Gupta thought she was not right for the part, although she was invited at the audition, where he failed to recognize her at the first tryout. Mehta did get the part, and it became her debut film as a lead.

"Rohit and I met as someone had suggested my name for this role, but in that meeting he told me, I was not right for the part, and maybe in future we would work together on another project. I still got an audition call and I thought it was probably a mistake that I had been called in, but decided to go anyway. Since I had nothing to gain or lose, I went without dressing up like an actor (to impress). I was wearing regular shirt and jeans and no make up at all. Rohit did not recognize me at first and then when I introduced myself he said you look very different today. I auditioned and he offered me the part.

She also appeared as the lead in Penumbra, a short film which was showcased at Short film corner - Cannes film festival in 2012. She played the role of Priya in Yaatra which she also wrote and produced.

Mehta was seen playing Nisha in an off-off-Broadway show, Bollywood Wedding in New York. In addition to acting, Mehta also loves to write. She has written two plays and one screenplay so far. The first play she wrote was Grahan, which won her best script and three other awards at a theatre competition, "Astitva 2004" in Mumbai. In 2012 Mehta wrote and performed her one-woman show, Honour. She performed 5 different characters in Honour which was produced by "La Mama and Loose Change Productions". She was invited to perform a Bollywood form dance sequence at the World Music & Independent Film Festival's 2011 gala awards ceremony in Washington D.C where she was nominated for the Best Actress award for her performance in Life! Camera Action..... She shared the stage with 2 times Golden Globe and Academy awards nominee Carol Connors (singer).

== Philanthropy ==
Mehta’s one-woman show HONOUR: Confessions of a Mumbai Courtesan throws light on sex trafficking and her show provided platform for an interactive panel discussion for AF3IRM NY chapter.

== Filmography ==
Year	Film	Role	Notes
2008	Colors of Passion	Reporter	
2009	Victory	Gauri	(feature)
2009	Red Corvette	Larry's friend	
2010	Walkaway	Nidhi's sister-in-law (cameo role)	(feature)
2011	I dream of hope	Sia	(short film)
2011	Khushiyaan	actress	(Punjabi language feature film)
2012	Life! Camera Action...	Reina	won critical acclaim (debut as lead in a feature film)
2012	Yaatra	lead actress, producer, writer, co-director	(short film)
2012	Penumbra	Krishna	(short film)
2012	A Date.. (Nuvvu, Nenu...Tanu)	Mona	(short film)
2013	Mamaros	Savi	(short film)
2013	Eternal Love	Yamini	(short film)
2014	An American in Hollywood	(cameo role)	(feature)
2014	Split	Shiela	(feature)
2014	A Box Came to Brooklyn	Dipti	(short film)
2016	Midnight Delight	Scientist	(feature)
2016	Far Away	Ritika	(short)
2017	Going Public	surgeon	(short)
2017	Accommodations	Diya	(feature)
2017	Humor Me	Pakistani Woman	(feature)
2020	Superintelligence		(feature)

== Television ==
Year	Film	Director	Role	Character	Notes
2013	Golden Boy	Karen Gaviola	Actress	Kate McKenna	season 1, episode 12
2013	One Life to Live	Habib Azar	Actress	Doctor	season 1, episode 37
2013	One Life to Live	Jessica Klein, Thom Racina	Actress	Doctor	season 1, episode 36
2013	One Life to Live	Jessica Klein, Thom Racina	Actress	Doctor	season 1, episode 35
2013	One Life to Live	Jessica Klein, Thom Racina	Actress	Doctor	season 1, episode 3
2015	Deadline Crime With Tamron Hall	Sandya Viswanathan	Actress	Nazish	season 3, episode 10
2015	The Blacklist	Terrence O'Hara	Actress	Doctor	season 3, episode 108
2017	Shades of Blue	Steve Shill	Actress	Harlee's Nurse	season 3, episode 305

== Awards and nominations ==
Festival/Award	Year, Location	Project	Category	Outcome
South Asian International Performing Arts Festival	New York	HONOUR: Confessions of a Mumbai Courtesan	Best Actress	Won
International Filmmaker Festival of World Cinema	2016 Milan, Italy	Midnight Delight	Best Actress	Nominated
World Music & Independent Film Festival	2013, USA	Yaatra	Best Screenplay in short film	Nominated
World Music & Independent Film Festival	2013, USA	Yaatra	Best Director in International short film shared with Erica Gould	Nominated
World Music & Independent Film Festival	2013, USA	Yaatra	Best Actress international short film	Nominated
World Music & Independent Film Festival	2013, USA	Yaatra	Best Women Filmmakers shared with Erica Gould	Nominated
World Music & Independent Film Festival	2013, USA	Yaatra	Best Director - Southeast Asia	Nominated
World Music & Independent Film Festival	2013, USA	Yaatra	Best Short Film - Southeast Asia	Won
Sunset International Film Festival	2012, USA	Life! Camera Action...	Best Female Actor	Won
28th Goldie Film Awards	2012, USA	Life! Camera Action...	Best Actress	Won
HMIFF	2012, USA	Life! Camera Action...	Best Actress	Nominated
Prestige Film Awards	2012, USA	Life! Camera Action...	Gold Award - Leading Actress	Won
Golden Door Film Festival of Jersey City	2011, USA	Life! Camera Action...	Best Female Lead	Nominated
World Music & Independent Film Festival	2011, USA	Life! Camera Action...	Best Actress	Nominated
Silent River Film Festival	2011, USA	Life! Camera Action...	Best Actress	Nominated
