= Midnight Delight =

Midnight Delight may refer to:

- Midnight Delight, a 1982 Smokie album
- Midnight Delight (film)
