= Lee'Mon =

Lee’Mon
- Origin: Albury-Wodonga, Australia
- Genres: Indie pop
- Years active: 2011–present
- Website: http://www.leemon.com.au

Lee’Mon is an Australian indie pop group originating from Albury-Wodonga. There is some mystery surrounding the group, their makeup and their members. Their music has been described as adventurous, mysterious and intriguing. They cite Grace Jones, Elvis Presley and David Bowie as their main musical influences.

The group's frontman, Liam Willoughby, cited the reasons for this ambiguousness as responding to the over availability of information explaining that "There’s no generic bio saying "we grew up here" or "we went to that school there", it's purely art. Like us or hate us, people's opinions of us are based on the music and that's the way it should be!" Lee’Mon first appeared on triple J's Home & Hosed program in October 2011, performing a song called 'One Man in the Woods.', which received national recognition. The song had been described as "fluid & sophisticated" but it was most notable for its unique sound, being described as "a really interesting song mixing a lot of different instruments together." In 2012 the group received an honourable mention in the international "Unsigned Only" songwriting competition alongside Melbourne's Skipping Girl Vinegar & Ballarat's Hunting Grounds, they were also a semi-finalist in the International Songwriting Competition. In the same year, Lee’Mon began working on their first record with producer Paul "Woody" Annison.

In mid-2012, Lee’Mon had released their debut single, "Albury", through the label "redcatsounds". The song, which is described as "Moody", was accompanied by a sinister video which received wide attention and featured in several film festivals around the world including the ITSA Film Festival in California, the BBC Music Video Festival in the UK, the Blue Mountains Film Festival in Sydney and, in 2013, was a finalist in the music video category of the International Songwriting Competition. In November 2013, the song ran 3rd in the Australian Independent Music Awards, Video category. It was also broadcast on National Television in Australia including the ABC TV program Rage. The video did not feature any of the band members which further increased the mystery surrounding the group.

The song received national and international airplay, but it was most noted for member Liam's strong Australian accent which divided many opinions.

In March 2013, Lee'Mon released their second single "Genetics". The song was described as "great songwriting and extremely catchy". It was also described as "something different to what is being thrown up by most musicians at the moment". Genetics received airplay from various radio stations and was shown nationally in Australia by Richard Kingsmill on triple J in March 2013.

The accompanying video clip for "Genetics" was premiered by Groupie Magazine. and made its national television debut in Australia on the ABC's Rage program.

In May 2013, Lee’Mon released their third official single, "Albert Adam & Eve" a song inspired by Albert II, the first monkey in Space. The song was described as "something cool with layers of spacey, harmony-heavy pop showing off Lee'Mon's knack for quirky and inventive songwriting." and "The lyrics are off the wall, but they’re anchored beautifully by strings and bells and a dirtied-up Rhodes piano. The track’s Lee’Mon’s third offering, and it shows us that while he might have grown up, he hasn’t grown any more mainstream!"
