= Corridor (film) =

- Movie Poster
- Directed by: Saumin Mehta
- Written by: Saumin Mehta
- Produced by: Saumin Mehta; Rohit Gupta
- Starring: Dhwanit Mehta; Meghana Shah; Anaya Shah
- Cinematography: Saumin Mehta
- Edited by: Saumin Mehta
- Music by: Zaher Akahshli
- Production companies: Dot and Feather Entertainment
- Distributed by: Pocket Films
- Release date: 2012
- Running time: 9 minutes
- Language: English

Corridor is a 2012 horror short film written, edited, and directed by Saumin Mehta and produced by Rohit Gupta and Saumin Mehta. The film was acquired for digital distribution by Pocket Films and subsequently released on YouTube in December of the same year. On October 23, 2014 NDTV Prime - India's prime national television channel broadcast the film nationwide.

== Plot ==
Corridor is a short film about a young man, who on the way to his apartment one night, starts hearing uncanny sounds. Convinced that he is being followed, he starts to run in panic through those endless empty corridors, till he has nowhere to hide and waits for the mystery to unfold.

== Cast ==
- Dhwanit Mehta
- Meghana Shah
- Anaya Shah

== Accolades ==
- Nominee for the "Best South Asian Short Film" at the World Music & Independent Film Festival in Washington, D.C., USA
- Official Selection at the Mumbai Shotz in India.
- Official Selection at Directors Circle Festival of Shorts in PA, USA.
- NDTV Prime broadcast the film nationwide in India.
