= Shaheed Woods =

American actor

Shaheed K. Woods
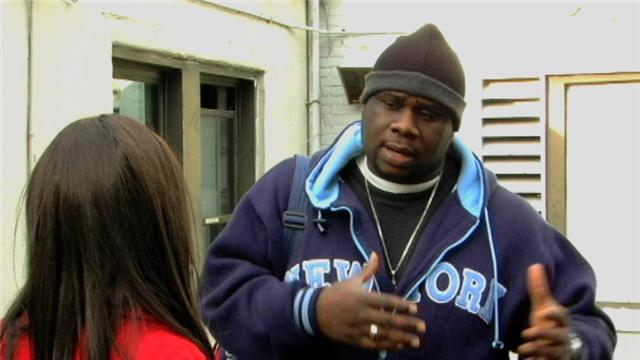
- Born: Shaheed Kamal Jihad Woods; Jersey City, New Jersey; United States
- Occupations: Actor, comedian, poet
- Years active: 2009–present

Shaheed K. Woods (born Shaheed Kamal Jihad Woods) is an American actor, comedian born and raised in Jersey City, New Jersey. He is best known for A Gentleman, Midnight Delight, Life! Camera Action... earning him accolades.

== Early life ==
Woods grew up in Jersey City and attended Fred W. Martin Elementary school.

== Acting career ==
Woods first came to prominence with his lead role in Life! Camera Action... playing as Mike for which he won his first international award for the 'Best Supporting Lead Actor'. He first took to acting in theater, having done several local plays including 'Underneath It All' at Newark Symphony Hall. Having performed at several venues, members of the Newark art scene have dubbed him "The Beacon of Light". One performance was a fundraiser benefit for the documentary "Face of Darkness" hosted by Kenneth Todd Nelson and Squeaky Moore. After performing in several short films, he met filmmaker Rohit Gupta on the set of a short directed by a fellow alum of the New York Film Academy. It was then that they formed their friendship, and began discussing a short film project which ended up as the critically acclaimed film Life! Camera Action... marking Woods debut as lead in a feature.

Woods took to directing with the short play "Off the Bridge" written by Akua Doku. He then was selected to direct a reading with an all female ensemble cast titled "Rebirth of the Black Woman" in New York. He has also worked with Playwright Carol White several short plays. Any Minute Now, written by White, won first place in the Short Play Lab at Roy Arias studios in Manhattan. He has worked in the background on Pariah with Dee Rees and played the role of Meat in the pilot of an upcoming series titled "Boys and Girls".

Woods went to gain further acclaim with his lead role in the cult-comedy Midnight Delight winning acclaim and awards. He features in three vignettes in the film including "Epiphanation", "Free Will" and the voice of mouse as the main character in the "Animation" vignette of the film. Woods got noticed in Life! Camera Action... & Midnight Delight and was offered a prominent role by Fox Star Studios to feature in a Bollywood film A Gentleman which released worldwide on 25 August 2017.

== Filmography ==
†	Denotes films that have not yet been released

Year	Film	Role	Notes
2010	Non Compos Mentis	Big Sha	
2011	Psycho-Path: Mania	Dr. Ofori	
2011	He Said, She Said (a romantic comedy)	Uomo	
2011	Pariah		
2012	Life! Camera Action...	Mike	Won Best Supporting Actor award
2013	Cherry Pop	Terry	Short
2013	One City NIght	Elevator Man	Short
2013	Full Circle	Goon 4	
2014	Bongo Killer Crown	Dr. Louis	
2016	Midnight Delight	Lead	
2016	WTF		Unreleased
2017	A Gentleman	as Koko	
2017	The Killer Contract		
2017	The Black Eagle of Harlem	as self	Documentary
2018	George Washington: The Farewell Address †	Narrator (Self)	Documentary
2020	Washington Irving: An American Original †	Narrator (Self)	Documentary

== Television ==
Year	TV Series	Director	Role	Character	Notes
2017	Boys & Girls: The Series	Darik Bernard	Actor	Big Meat	

== Accolades ==
- Won, Best Supporting Actor - Life! Camera Action... @ 28th Goldie Film Awards, USA.
- Nominated, Best Supporting Actor - Life! Camera Action...@ Golden Door Film Festival, USA.
