= Randy Parsons: American Luthier =

- Directed by: David Aldrich
- Produced by: David Aldrich
- Starring: Randy Parsons
- Cinematography: David Aldrich; Amy Batzel
- Edited by: David Aldrich
- Release date: October 4, 2011 (ITSA Film Festival)
- Running time: 8 minutes
- Country: United States
- Language: English

Randy Parsons: American Luthier is a 2011 documentary short film about Randy Parsons, an American luthier whose client list includes Jack White, Jimmy Page, Sammy Hagar, Death Cab for Cutie, Peter Frampton, Joe Perry, and Modest Mouse.

== Synopsis ==
American Luthier focuses on Randy Parsons’ transformation from aspiring musician to guitar-maker. The guitar had been Parsons’ identity since he was a child, but after studying classical and jazz guitar in college, he realized that he would not make a living as a musician. He gave it up and did not own a guitar in his mid-twenties. He later had a vision of how the guitar would come back into his life. Parsons creates instruments for clients like Jack White, Jimmy Page and Joe Perry. The film is about someone who gave up their passion for playing guitars and discovered that they had a passion for making them. Parsons’ success is described as a testament to doing what one loves in life and work, even if it requires taking a second look at one's dreams.

== Production ==
Randy Parsons: American Luthier was produced, directed, filmed and edited by David Aldrich. Amy Batzel is also credited with cinematography. The music in scene four is Michael Chorney's "Shabaz", found on his album Oom Pah Of The Ghost Parade. The film's original score is by David Aldrich, and Randy Parsons.

== Awards ==
The film won Best Documentary Film at the 2011 ITSA Film Festival, Best Cinematography and an Award of Excellence at the 2012 LA Movie Awards, and has been an official selection for more than thirty-five film festivals. The film made its broadcast debut on Public Television as part of Reel NW | Season Four. It was nominated for a 2014 Emmy Award.
