= Angelena: Change the World =

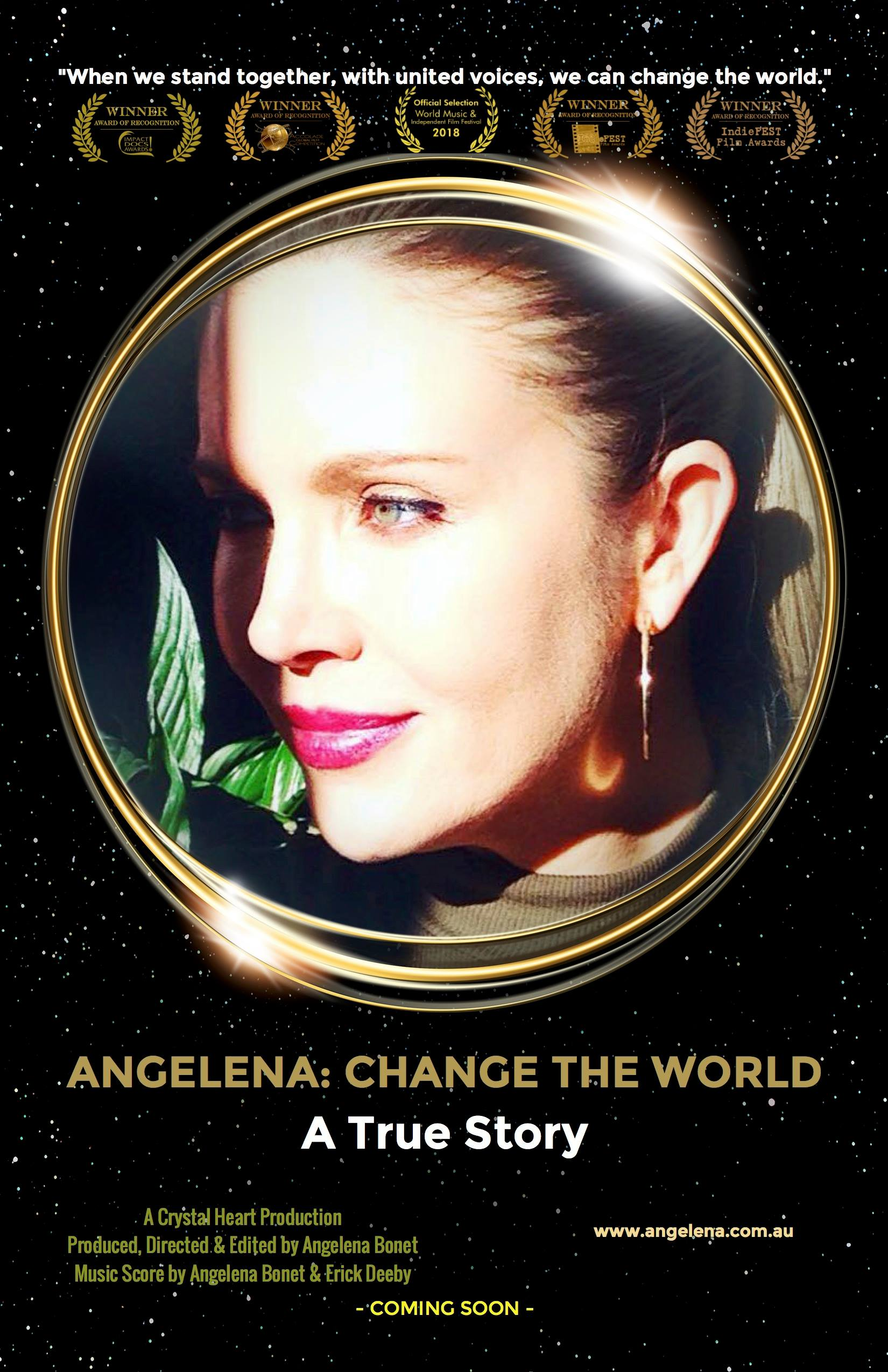
- Theatrical release poster
- Directed by: Angelena Bonet
- Written by: Angelena Bonet
- Produced by: Angelena Bonet
- Narrated by: Angelena Bonet
- Cinematography: Angelena Bonet
- Edited by: Angelena Bonet
- Music by: Angelena Bonet and Erick Deeby
- Release date: 2017
- Running time: 72 minutes
- Country: Australia
- Language: English

Angelena: Change The World is a 2017 Australian autobiographical documentary film based on the Australian-born model/actress Angelena Bonet, evolving into a singer-songwriter, journalist/producer, and global women's rights activist. The entire film was produced and starred by herself.

== Premise ==
Journey of Angelena Bonet as a child, who first appeared on television at the age of four in her hometown of Sydney, whose career grew to be an Australian supermodel, singer-songwriter and global women's rights activist, in particular violence against women.

== Production ==
Angelena Bonet self-funded the whole production (Crystal Heart Productions) and worked under a micro-budget. The film features raw footage of her whole life to the present day and was shot on location in Australia, Philippines, Italy, Canada and the US. She also co-wrote the music score with her late fiancé, Erick Deeby.

== Activism ==
Bonet is donating 10% of her soundtrack album sales to her non-profit organization Crystal Heart Foundation to support female survivors of sexual violence and those suffering from Post Traumatic Stress Disorder.

== Soundtrack ==
Score & all tracks composed by Angelena Bonet & Erick Deeby. All tracks performed by Angelena Bonet.

1. "Tragic Fairytale" (Original Song at IndieFEST Film Awards: Won)
2. "Revolution"
3. "Downtown"
4. "Live Forever"
5. "Change The World"
6. "On My Way"
7. "Crystalize"

== Awards and nominations ==
Year	Nominee / work	Award	Result
2017	Angelena: Change The World	Impact DOCS Awards – Award of Recognition	Won

Year	Nominee / work	Award	Result
2018	Angelena: Change The World	World Music & Independent Film Festival – Best Documentary Feature; World Music & Independent Film Festival – Best Director; World Music & Independent Film Festival – Best Female Filmmaker	Nominated
