= Silent River Film Festival =

- Location: Irvine, California, United States
- Founded by: Kalpna Singh-Chitnis (2011–Present)
- Language: International
- Website: silentriverfilmfestival.com

The Silent River Film Festival (SRFF) held annually, is a non-profit organization based in Irvine, California, USA, 40 miles (64 km) south of Hollywood. In its third year, it is a program of the Silent River film and Literary Society, focussed on promoting the art of cinema and literature.

== Background ==
Founded in 2011 by filmmaker, actor and poet Kalpna Singh-Chitnis, SRFF is Irvine's first international film festival, dedicated to global independent filmmakers. Since its beginning in 2011, the festival has showcased over 160 films from 30 countries, premiering some of the highly acclaimed films and documentaries such as I Am Kalam by Nila Madhab Panda, The Highest Pass by Jon Fitzgerald, Oscar nominated short Raju by Max Zähle, No God No Master by Terry Green, Unbowed by Chung ji-young, English Vinglish by Gauri Shinde, How I Became An Elephant by Tim Gorski and studio films from Walt Disney, UTV and Eros International. SRFF is established with the vision to bring East and West together to share their best work of films and Cinema for Causes on one platform to raise awareness about the issues that matters.

== Cinema for Causes ==
Cinema for Causes platform is known for introducing Cinecause a film festival founded by Jon Fitzgerald, one of the co-founders of Slamdance Film Festival and documentaries like When the Dragon Swallowed the Sun and How I Became an Elephant both winning the best documentary award at the festival's first year.

== Official Selections ==
=== 2012 Film Screenings ===
==== Narrative Features ====
Title	Director	Cast
Unbowed (South Korea)	Chung Ji-Yeong	Ahn Sung-ki, Park Won-sang
No God, No Master (USA)	Terry Green	David Strathairn, Sam Witwer, Alessandro Mario, Mike Bacarella, Scott Annala
Jalpari: The Desert Mermaid (India)	Nila Madhab Panda	Lehar Khan, Parvin Dabas, Harsh Mayar, Tannishtha Chatterjee, Rahul Singh, Krishang Trivedi
186 Dollars to Freedom (Peru/USA)	Camilo Vila	John Robinson, Michael DeLorenzo, Alex Meraz, Johnny Lewis, Grant Bowler, Paul Ramirez
Lessons in Forgetting (India)	Unni Vijayan	Adil Hussain, Roshni Achreja, Maya Tideman, Raaghav Chanana
Bloom (USA)	Diane Kern	Marcie Price, Randy Alvarado, Antonio R. Munoz, Louis Pierone, Mark Adam Goff
A Gran Plan (Singapore)	Sangeeta Nambiar	Farida Jalal, Oliver Kennett, Tania Mukherjee, Neil Shaabi, Pavan J Singh

==== Documentary Features ====
Title	Director	Cast
How I became an Elephant (Myanmar, Thailand, USA)	Tim Gorksi	Tim Gorski, Carol Buckley, Lek Chailert, Joyce Poole
California State of Mind: The Legacy of Pat Brown (USA)	Sascha Rice	Tom Brokaw, Jerry Brown, Willie Brown (politician), Warren Christopher, Gray Davis
Greening the Revolution (USA)	Katie Curran	Klee Benally
Aung San Suu Kyi (Denmark)	Lady of No Fear	
Road Map to Apartheid (USA)	Ana Nogueira	Alice Walker
Ari Ari the Korean Cinema (South Korea)	Heo Chul, Chung Ji-young	Ahn Sung-ki, Bong Joon-ho, Im Kwon-taek
In A Race Against Time (Uganda)	Michael Zynda	Mike O'Brian, Daniel Okabe, Renah Wolzinger
Knocking on The Devil's Door (USA)	Gary Null, Valerie Van Cleve	

==== Feature Animations ====
Title	Director	Cast
Arjun: The Warrior Prince	Anrab Chaudhuri	A Walt Disney / UTV film (Non-competition)
The King of Pigs (South Korea)	Yeon Sang-ho	

=== 2011 Film Screenings ===
==== Narrative Features ====
Title	Director	Cast
I am Kalam	Nila Madhab Panda	Gulshan Grover, Pitobash
Meherjaan	Rubaiyat Hoosain	Jaya Bhaduri Bachchan, Victor Banerjee, Humayun Faridi
The Kindness of Strangers	Deborah Hadfield	David Prowse
Fairview St.	Michael McCallum	Michael McCallum, William C. McCallum, Elizabeth Moore
Life! Camera Action...	Rohit Gupta	Dipti Mehta, Shaheed Woods, Noor Naghmi, John Crann
Dark Resonance (Bangladesh)	Mithu Mahmood Khalid	Masum Aziz, Mamnun Hasan Emon
Mausams (Singapore)	Shilpa Krishnan Shulka	Shweta Sharma, Naren Kolary, Poorna Prasad, Shivanu Shukla
Finding Jenua	Alison Mason	Leigh Rose, Gayle James
A. Hitler (USA) Non Competition	Barry Hershey	Joel Grey, Norman Rodway
Goodbye My Friend (USA) (Non-competition)	Kalpna Singh-Chitnis	Kalpna Singh-Chitnis, Carlo Astuti, Reef Karim, Dwight Hicks, Monique La Barr

==== Documentary features ====
Title	Director	Cast
The Highest Pass	Jon Fitzgerald	Eric Braff, Ariane de Bonvoisin, Paul Greene, Brooks Hale
Wild Eyes: The Abby Sunderland Story (USA)	Laurence Sunderland	Luca del Poppo, Michael I. Goode, Jason Jalivay
When the Dragon Swallowed the Sun (USA)	Dirk Simon	Youdon Aukatsang, Bhusang, Tenzin Choeying, Tenzin Chogkyi, the Dalai Lama
Tareq Aziz: The Other Truth (Italy)	Jean-Marie Benjamin	
Wild Horses & Renegades (USA)	James Kleinert	Jim Baca, Michael Blake, Tokala Clifford, Sheryl Crow, Daryl Hannah
Death By Medicine (USA)	Gary Null	
Catching Dreams (USA)	Kevin Flint	Brian Flint, Tony Steele
Walking the Waking Journey (Nepal, Philippines)	Ferdinand Balanag	Lama Tenzin Cheogyal
John Muir in the New World (USA)	Catherine Tatge	Tom Mesmer, Peter N. Peregrine
Problema: Who are we in the 21st Century? (Germany)	Ralf Schmerberg	Hafsat Abiola, Willem Dafoe, Yassin Adnan, Martin Almada
Changement I'Histoire a travers les yeux des Guineens (Italy)	Chiara Cavallazzi	Moussa Dadis Camara, Kaba Saran Daraba, Rabiatou Diallo, Thierno Sow
Strong Bodies Fight (USA)	William Donaruma	

== Awards ==
Each year, awards are presented to recognize filmmakers for their work and contribution to the world of cinema. The Silent River Film Festival award winner's list includes:
Oscar-nominated actor David Strathairn, CSI star Jorja Fox, Ahn Sung-ki, Toby Kebbell from Prince of Persia: The Sands of Time, The Sorcerer's Apprentice, War Horse; Jon Fitzgerald (founder of Slamdance, Santa Barbara and Cinecause film festivals), Arjan Lulla (Founder - Eros International), Babu Subramaniam of ER, Outsourced fame, Jaya Bachchan from Meherjaan, Chung ji-young (Unbowed), Rohit Gupta's Life! Camera Action..., Jean Marie Benjamin's Tariq Aziz: The other Truth, Abby Sunderland's Abby Sunderland Story, Juliette West's How I Became An Elephant) and many others.
