= Randy Parsons =

American luthier (born 1965)

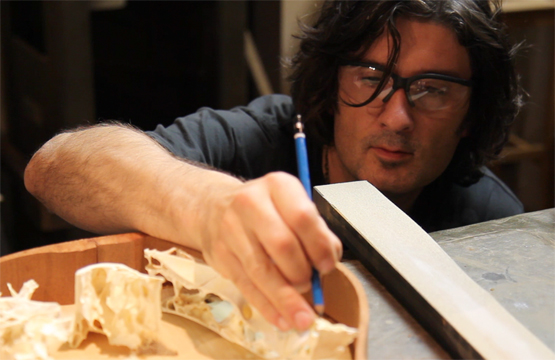
Randy Parsons, American Luthier

Randy Parsons (born 1965) is an American luthier whose client list includes Jack White, Jimmy Page, Sammy Hagar, Death Cab for Cutie, Peter Frampton, Joe Perry, and Modest Mouse.

Parsons uses hand tools and traditional guitar building methods, which he feels makes his work more authentic and personal. He strives to treat each new guitar as a one-of-a-kind sculpture, and embraces construction techniques of the '50s, '60s and '70s. He does not use newer technologies such as CNC machines, plek and fret machines. He is also known for using atypical items in his guitars, such as bones, skulls and other organic materials. Parsons created a line of high-end electric guitars built from recycled car tires, newspapers, non-endangered woods and ceramics.

Parsons creates unique finishes and treatments on his guitars. Parsons used peach colored rose petals that were dried in books and painstakingly applied to the guitar body for the model known as Peach Thief, which was built for singer/songwriter Karen Elson.

Despite starting with no training as a luthier, he has built a business with five different shops. Until 2013 he worked out of his main shop in Seattle, which was run by five women, three of whom are luthiers. In August 2013, Parsons moved with his main shop to Ventura, California.

Parsons has made five guitars for Jack White. White hired Parsons to have a custom Gretsch guitar made rather than working directly with the Gretsch Guitar Company. White wanted the color of the guitar to be copper for the Raconteurs. White's ideas were integrated into the guitar, which he called the Triple Jet. The original guitar was painted a copper color. Parsons later suggested using a real copper top. Parsons built the Triple Jet III, which is now White's number one guitar.

Parsons and White are featured in the documentary "It Might Get Loud," directed by Davis Guggenheim. A modified Gretsch Anniversary Jr. production model is introduced in the movie, which represents an interesting collaboration between White as a creative musician, and Parsons as a guitar builder. Parsons installed a coil from an industrial vacuum cleaner in this guitar named The Green Machine, so that the body could hold a retractable green bullet microphone that White pulls out to sing into.

After seeing the movie, Gretsch Guitars asked Parsons to create his own signature guitar for them. Parsons built a dark, gothic, hot rod Gretsch prototype that uses dried red sunflower seed petals in the finish.

A documentary short film about Parsons, Randy Parsons: American Luthier, premiered at the ITSA Film Festival at the Historic Sonoma Opera Hall on October 1, 2011. The film made its television debut on Public Television as part of Reel NW | Season four. It was nominated for an Emmy Award in April, 2015.

== Notable guitars ==
=== Triple Jet ===
- Production Date: 2006
- Production Run: 3
- Features: Copper Top

The Triple Jet guitar was commissioned by Jack White "The Raconteurs" in 2006.

=== The Black Vampire ===
- Production Date: 2011
- Production Run: 3
- Features: Gabon Ebony construction

The Black Vampire is completely built from Gabon ebony. From the carved ebony top, to the hollowed out ebony neck, everything except the red trim was built from the same piece of ebony. Looking under the headstock truss cover one can see 3 entombed Scorpions. The original Black Vampire was built for Microsoft co-founder Paul G. Allen. Its headstock is adorned with intricate scorpion carvings, and the back of the neck is inscribed with secret writings that are only visible under a black light. It is displayed under glass on Allen's yacht.

=== Strolling with Bones ===
- Production Date: 2009
- Production Run: 2
- Features: Bone frets, solid ebony neck and Kasha inspired bracing

"Strolling With Bones" was built for Jimmy Page in 2010.

=== Bruja ===
- Production Date: 2010

=== Green Machine ===
Production Date: 2008

=== Peach Thief ===
Production Date: 2009
