= Midnight Delight (film) =

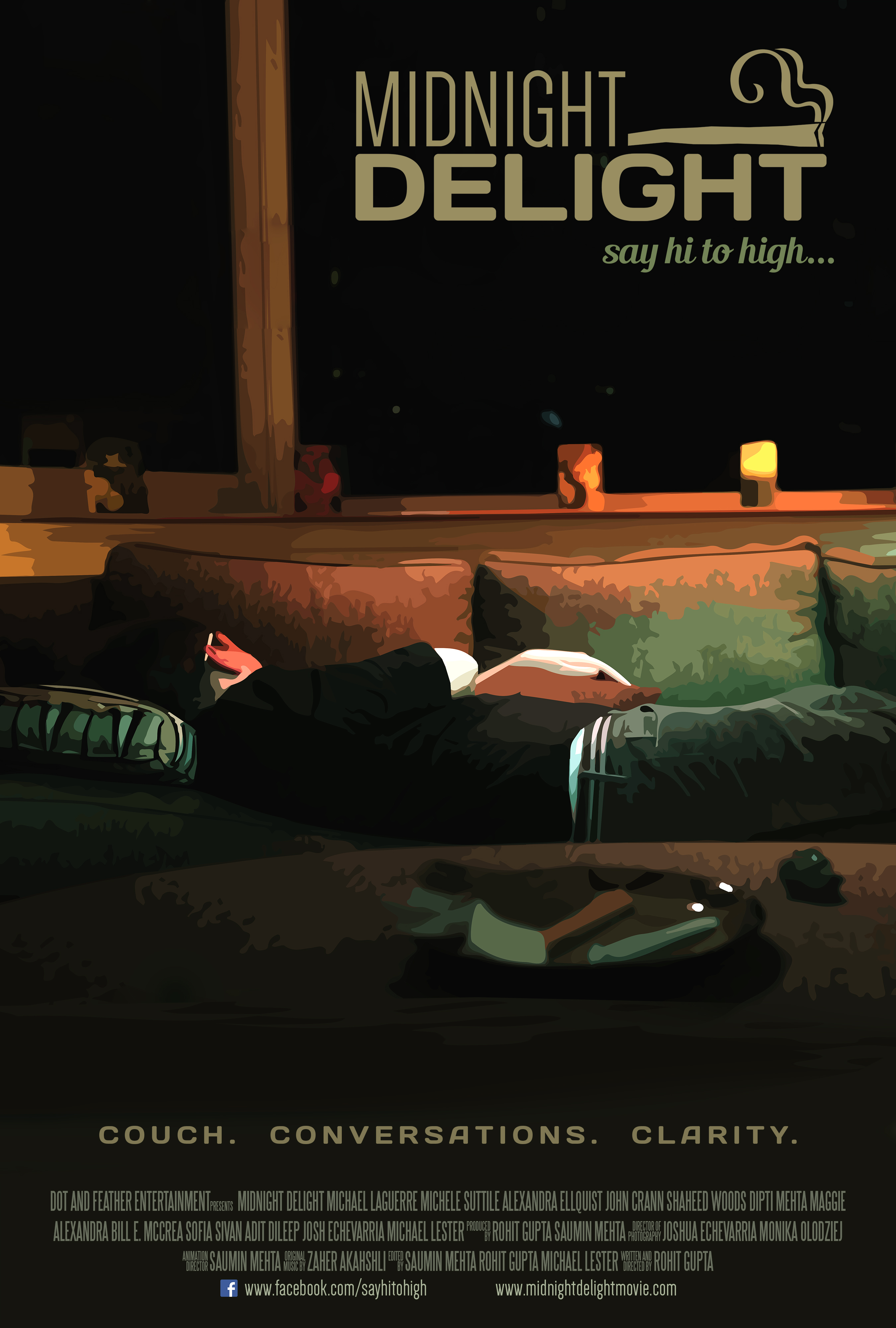
- Movie Poster
- Directed by: Rohit Gupta
- Written by: Rohit Gupta
- Produced by: Rohit Gupta; Saumin Mehta
- Starring: Shaheed Woods; Alexandra Hellquist; Dipti Mehta; Michael Laguerre; Maggie Alexander
- Cinematography: Joshua Echevarria; Monika Kolodziej
- Edited by: Rohit Gupta; Saumin Mehta; Michael Lester
- Music by: Zaher Akahshli
- Production companies: Dot & Feather Entertainment
- Release date: 21 July 2016; United States
- Running time: 85 minutes
- Country: United States
- Language: English

Midnight Delight is a 2016 American absurdist anthology film written and directed by Rohit Gupta. It is composed of nine vignettes of characters at a smoking lounge and their antics with people they have never met before. It stars an ensemble cast and produced by Gupta and Saumin Mehta under the production company Dot & Feather Entertainment. The film is the second feature directed by Gupta, best known for Life! Camera Action... and Another Day Another Life.

Midnight Delight premiered at the Cannabis Film Festival in Garberville, Humboldt County, California, where it won the "Judges Choice film of the festival" award followed by garnering various accolades and acclaim at several international film festivals. The film is considered part of the mumblecore movement. It was released on July 21, 2016, via video on demand (VOD) on various platforms including iTunes, Amazon.com, Google Play, Sony, Hoopla, Vimeo, Microsoft Movies & TV, Xbox. Midnight Delight is noted for its realism, concept and narrative style. On October 31, 2016, the film premiered at The Cannabis College in Amsterdam, Netherlands.

== Plot ==
Vignettes composition as follows:

=== High how are you ===
Features Michael Laguerre, John Crann (topics include hats, moisturizer).

=== Awakening ===
Features Dipti Mehta, Rachel Myers (topics include maths, infinity).

=== Epiphanation ===
Features Shaheed Woods, Michele Ann Suttile (topics include Why do we talk, What do models eat, If water makes us fat, dolphins).

=== Alone Together ===
Features Adit Dileep, Sofia Siva (topics include courting insights)

=== Still here? ===
Features Michael Laguerre, John Crann.

=== Hi...? ===
Features Bill McCrea, Maggie Alexander (as personal trainers.)

=== How high are you ===
Features Michael Laguerre, John Crann.

=== Introspecting ===
Features Joshua E.

=== illusion or Reality ===
Features Michael Laguerre, Alexandra Hellquist as an aspiring actress.

== Cast ==
- Shaheed Woods
- Alexandra Hellquist
- Dipti Mehta
- Michael Laguerre
- John Crann
- Maggie Alexander
- Michele Suttile
- Rachel Myers
- Michael Lester
- Bill E. McCrea
- Adit Dileep
- Sofia Sivan

== Production ==
=== Filming ===
Midnight Delight has been shot as an improvisatory movie with minimalist techniques and only few pages of treatment for a script. Instead of a script, the actors received outlines, which covered the plot points and were told what had to happen. The film was shot over a period of two nights with multi-camera setup and rehearsals by all actors prior to the filming. It is considered part of the mumblecore movement.

=== Marketing ===
The first official poster and teaser-trailer was released on the film's Facebook page on February 21, 2015. The extended version of the trailer was released on September 16, 2015.

=== Soundtrack ===
The score for Midnight Delight features two original songs.

No.	Title	Writer(s)	Artist(s)	Length
1.	"I Get High" (Theme Song)	Filo	Filo	4:07
2.	"I Hold"	Sivu	Sivu featuring Marika Hackman	3:46

== Release ==
The film was released on July 21, 2016, through video on demand.

== Reception ==
The film opened at the Cannabis Film Festival in Humboldt county, California where the jury stated "Watching Midnight Delight is like smoking a cinematic joint". At its Washington State premiere at the Hempapalooza Music & Film Festival it was stated, "Midnight Delight is a pure cinematic aphrodisiac that brings a completely new and fresh take on cannabis-based movies and culture”.

=== Critical response ===
The film received mixed reviews.

Daniel Libby of DopeChef was enthusiastic, rating the film four stars out of four. Libby suggested "Midnight Delight might be called a part stoner comedy, part philosophical dialogue on life. Through a series of vignettes featuring interwoven conversations, the characters have cannabis sessions and real stuff comes out" and that the film has something for everyone: "Viewers are sure to relate to at least one of the various characters or stoner-types. There’s something for everyone in the cannabis community. This movie is sure to delight audiences".

=== Awards and nominations ===
Location	Festival/Award	Category	Recipients and nominees	Result
USA	Accolade Global Film Competition	Award of Merit for Feature Film	Midnight Delight	Won
USA	Accolade Global Film Competition	Award of Merit for Best Lead Actor	Michael Laguerre	Won
USA	Buffalo Dreams Film Festival	Best Comedy feature	Midnight Delight	Nominated
USA	Cannabis Film Festival	Judges Choice Film of the Festival	Midnight Delight	Won
United States	Camp Cult Classics Film Festival	Classics award	Midnight Delight	Won
Manila, Philippines	iChill International Film Festival 2016	Most Controversial Film	Midnight Delight	Won
USA	21st Indie Gathering international Film Festival	Drama-Comedy feature	Midnight Delight	Won
Milan, Italy	International Filmmaker Festival of World Cinema	Best Lead Actress	Alexandra Hellquist	Nominated
Milan, Italy	International Filmmaker Festival of World Cinema	Best Supporting Actress	Dipti Mehta	Nominated

=== Selected Official Selection & Screening ===
- Blowup Chicago International Art House Film Festival, 'Experimental Einstein award' category, US.
- Cabo Verde Int. Film Festival 2016, 'Best Film' category, Sal, Cape Verde.
- Fantasmagorical (Fandom Fest) Film Festival, 'Fantasy Feature', US.
- Frack Fest Oklahoma City Underground Film Festival, US.
- Golden Door Film Festival, US
- Hempapalooza Music & Film Festival, US.
- Hong Kong Art House Film Festival, 'Underground Film', Hong Kong.
- iChill International Film Festival 2016, Manila, Philippines.
- 21st Indie Gathering int. Film Festival, 'Drama-Comedy', US.
- Sydney World Film Festival, 'Experimental Film', Australia.

== See also ==
- Clerks
- Coffee and Cigarettes
- Garry Marshall films
- High School
- Harold & Kumar Go to White Castle
- Kid Cannabis
- Pineapple Express
- Super High Me
