= Another Day Another Life =

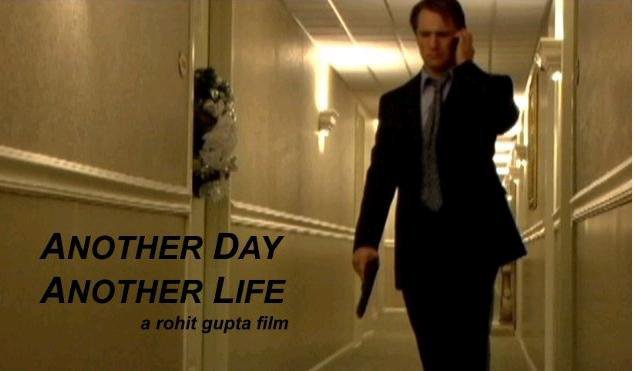
- Movie poster
- Directed by: Rohit Gupta
- Written by: GiriMohan Coneti
- Produced by: Rohit Gupta
- Starring: Benjamin Jacobs; Amneek Sandhu
- Cinematography: Carlos Deuringer
- Edited by: Rohit Gupta
- Music by: Peter Roessler
- Release date: 15 May 2009 (Cannes Film Festival); France
- Running time: 4 minutes
- Country: United States
- Language: English
- Budget: $100

Another Day Another Life is a 2009 American suspense thriller film produced, edited, and directed by Rohit Gupta. It's about a man, Jason, played by Benjamin Jacobs, who struggles to repress his killer instinct as he approaches the planned killing of his lover. The film was selected to showcase at the Short Film Corner - Cannes Film Festival 2009. It received critical acclaim at its festival run winning awards & nominations.

== Premise ==
After he loses everything, a man struggles with his desire for revenge.

== Cast ==
- Benjamin Jacobs as Jason
- Amneek Sandhu as Rachel

== Production ==
The film was shot in guerilla style in seven hours using Panasonic AG-DVX100 edited on Gupta's Mac Book Pro and put together for $100. It was shot in Newport, Jersey City.

== Critical reception ==
The film was selected to showcase at the Short Film Corner - Cannes 2009. It continued to be showcased for four years thereafter at the international festival circuit including at the International Astana Action Film Festival, Eastern Electronic Film Festival in the United Kingdom; Rainier Independent Film Festival, US; River Bend International Film Festival, US; India International Film Festival of Tampa Bay; Mix International Shorts Film Festival, US; Media Film Festival, US; Appalachian Film Festival, USA; The Dam Short Film Festival, US; Box[ur]Shorts Film Festival, Los Angeles; Big Mini DV Film Festival, NYC; Orlando Hispanic Film Festival, Florida; Brownfish Shorts Film Festival, New York City; Blue Snowman Film Festival, Canada; Rumschpringe International Short Film Festival 2011, US; Spirit Quest Film Festival, USA; United Nations Global Wake-Up Film Festival, Chicago; Silicon Valley Film Festival, US; Great Lakes International Film Festival, US; ITSA Film Festival, US; Anthem The Libertarian Film Festival, USA; Action On Film International Film Festival, US; IFC (Independent Film Channel) and Media Labs, US; EuroAsia Shorts International Film Festival and others.

A review from the Judges of the MIX International Shorts Film Festival said, "Another Day Another Life is a remarkably fast pace film, the action never slows or halts. The title is an excellent one that implies so many different things. There is no question this a compelling short film.". The film was chosen as the opening night film at the Golden Door International Film Festival. Bill Sorvino, Festival Director said: "We feel very fortunate to have such a strong beginning to our festival". On September 11, 2014 NDTV Prime, India's prime national television channel, broadcast the film nationwide.

== Awards and nominations ==
The film has received various awards and nominations, with the nominations categories mainly ranging from recognition of the film itself (Best Short Film) to its direction, dramatic impact, music, and writing.

Festival/Award	Location	Category	Recipients and nominees	Outcome
Golden Door Film Festival of Jersey City	USA	Best Short Short	Another Day Another Life	Nominated
Golden Door Film Festival of Jersey City	USA	Best Concept for Short Short	GiriMohan Coneti	Won
Golden Door Film Festival of Jersey City	USA	Best Director for Short Short	Rohit Gupta	Nominated
Golden Door Film Festival of Jersey City	USA	Best Jersey City/Local Film	Another Day Another Life	Nominated
Canada International Film Festival	Canada	Best Experimental Film	Another Day Another Life	Won
World Music & Independent Film Festival	USA	Best Original Soundtrack	Peter Roessler	Nominated
World Music & Independent Film Festival	USA	Best Screenplay	GiriMohan Coneti	Nominated
World Music & Independent Film Festival	USA	Best Cinematography	Carlos Deuringer	Nominated

== Official selections and screenings ==
Festival/Event	Country
Cannes Film Festival	France
Rainier Independent Film Festival	USA
River Bend International Film Festival	USA
Eastern Electronic Film Festival	United Kingdom
The Dam Short Film Festival	USA
Cape Town & Winelands International Film Festival	South Africa
Mix International Shorts Film Festival	USA
Media Film Festival Film	USA
Appalachian Film Festival	USA
Box[ur]Shorts Film Festival	USA
Golden Door International Film Festival	USA
Big Mini DV Film Festival	USA
India International Film Festival of Tampa Bay	USA
International Astana Action Film Festival	Republic of Kazakhstan
Orlando Hispanic Film Festival	USA
Indie Gathering Film Festival	USA
Brownfish Shorts Film Festival	USA
World Music & Independent Film Festival	USA
Blue Snowman Film Festival	Canada
Rumschpringe International Short Film Festival	USA
Spirit Quest Film Festival	USA
Swansea Bay Film Festival	United Kingdom
Action On Film International Film Festival	USA
United Nations Global Wake-Up Film Festival	USA
NDTV	India
Silicon Valley Film Festival	USA
Great Lakes International Film Festival	USA
ITSA Film Festival	USA
Anthem The Libertarian Film Festival	USA
Hoboken International Film Festival	USA
ONECLOUDFEST	Sweden
EuroAsia Shorts International Film Festival	USA
IFC	USA

== See also ==
- The Usual Suspects
- Before the Devil Knows You're Dead
- Changing Lanes
