= Finding Jenua =

- Theatrical release poster
- Directed by: Alison Mason
- Screenplay by: Alison Mason
- Produced by: Alison Mason; Brian Mason
- Starring: Leigh Rose; Gayle James
- Cinematography: Kev Robertson
- Edited by: Sylvette Artinian; Pål Gengenbach; Katie Hetland; Alison Mason
- Music by: Haavard Christopher Hana; Cody Westheimer
- Production company: Then What Films
- Distributed by: Vanguard Cinema
- Release dates: January 10, 2011 (Idyllwild Independent Festival); May 29, 2012 (United States)
- Running time: 70 minutes
- Country: United States
- Language: English

Finding Jenua is an American film written, produced and directed by Alison Mason. The drama features Leigh Rose, Gayle James and Jordan Mantell.

== Plot ==
The film is about a young woman (Gayle James) running away from her past and moves in with a woman (Leigh Rose) who is suffering from Alzheimer's disease and she believes is her granddaughter.

== Cast ==
- Leigh Rose as Jean
- Gayle James as Edie
- Jordan Mantell as Cal
- Brian Mason as Bill
- Christine Kellogg-Darrin as Faye
- Jack Cornelius as Horace
- Jen Davis as Rita
- Jennifer Davis as Edie's Mom
- Josh Davis as Jon
- Jayme Rhae Edwards as Younger Jean
- Mark Fier as Neighborhood Boy
- Olivia Lauletta as Young Edie
- Candice Rose as Young Jean
- Bryan Ryan as Rick
- Tracy Schmetterer as Shelly
- Owen Sholar as Young Michael

== Background ==
When the film was originally in development (approximately 8 years), the film had numerous A-list actors attached to the film, including Mandy Moore, Mark Ruffalo, Diane Keaton, and Tony Goldwyn.

== Exhibition ==
In 2011, the film appeared in numerous film festivals, has found distribution, and will be released on DVD in May 2012 nationwide. In an interview with KABC television, Mason said, "We are going to be all over the planet, I think, in May. DVD, Netflix, I think it's going to be on the moon. It's everywhere."

== Film festivals ==
- Idyllwild Independent Festival - Winner Best Screenplay
- Binational Independent Film Festival - En Certain Regard
- Beloit International Film Festival
- Los Angeles Women's International Film Festival
- Newport Beach Film Festival
- Waterfront Film Festival
- Alaska International Film Awards - Winner of the Denali Award
- Silent River Film Festival
- Rivers' Edge Film Festival - Winner 'Best Of The Fest' - Narrative Feature
- Prescott Film Festival

== See also ==
- Alzheimer's disease
