= Peckhammer TV =

Internet TV show

- Genre: News magazine
- Created by: David E. Aldrich
- Presented by: David Aldrich; Juliette Pezé
- Country of origin: United States
- Original language: English

Original release
- Network: blip.tv

Peckhammer TV was an Internet TV show that premiered on YouTube on February 5, 2008, and ran until November 2010, with one final episode posted on April 6, 2013. The motorcycle-themed shows often included educational content. Peckhammer TV was produced by David E. Aldrich, a Seattle-based documentary director, cinematographer and independent motorsports journalist.

Peckhammer TV was created by David Aldrich, AKA Peckhammer, who was the writer, director, editor and producer. Aldrich is known in the new media field for his early work in podcasting. Together with his assistant producer, Juliette Pezé ("Girl Wonder"), the two flew around the United States to document the industry and interview notable riders such as racing great Eddie Mulder, and Hollywood stunt woman Alisa Hensley-Lane.

Peckhammer TV operated as an independent, self-financed, nonprofit project. Peckhammer focused on stories that were not usual for television, such as racing support teams. This, and the fact that assistant producer Pezé is tri-lingual and could conduct interviews in several languages, made the show notable.

Peckhammer TV debuted in 2008, and gained an international following. New webisodes were released monthly via several online outlets. The webisode "Bob Milewsky, 2008 Chehalis Classic" was written about in Racer X online magazine. Peckhammer TV videos hosted on YouTube have received more than 1,000,000 views.

== Episodes ==
=== Season 1 (2008) ===
1. Making a Custom Motorcycle Seat
2. BMW R1200R: Windshield Basics
3. Part One: The Moped Aesthetic
4. Part Two: Rust to Glory, Moped Maintenance Tips
5. Part Three: Unleash The Beast, Moped Performance Tuning
6. Interview: Chuck Graves, of Team Graves Yamaha Supermoto
7. Interview: David Joy, Troy Lee Designs Honda Supermoto Team
8. Interview: Richard Harrison, Race engineer, ATK Supermoto
9. Interview: Paul Adams, PPIHC Motorcycle Mechanic
10. Interview: Alan Heffernan, Desert Racer
11. Interview: Team MAX BMW at PPIHC
12. Interview: Eddie Mulder, Racing Legend
13. Interview: Glenn Cox, "Lucky 13"
14. Interview: Team Les Marluches (French Language Version)
15. Interview: Bob Milewsky, 2008 Chehalis Classic
16. Les Triplettes de Bonneville (French Language Version)
17. Zachary Norman and His Amazing Electric Motorcycle
18. Randy Smith, The BMW R75/5 Bonneville Racer
19. Texas Panhead Blazes Its Way Into The Record Books
20. Alan Thoresen: Black Thunder at Bonneville
21. Bonneville: Passion, Endurance and Teamwork
22. Dave Terrell's Day in the Dirt

=== Season 2 (2009) ===
1. Eddie Mulder's Triumphant Garage
2. Alisa Hensley-Lane, Stunt Professional
3. Touratech
4. Trials First, Trials Last
5. Quick Rides: 2009 Moto Guzzi V7 Classic
6. Jack Renolds: Blazing New Trails in the Motorcycle Rental Landscape
7. Maximum Exposure: Rigging a Motorcycle with FilmTools
8. Profiles in Vintage Racing: Keith Speir
9. The Art of Perseverance: Glenn Cox
10. Nine-Sixty-Eight: Brianne Corn
11. Battery Powered, Ferrari Fast: Jon Taylor, Tesla Motors
12. Michael Lewis: Going Nomad

=== Season 3 (2010) ===
1. Hips, Grips, Bars, Risers, and Seats
2. Engineering For Adventure
3. Dave Preston, Managing Team Ride West
4. Quick Rides: 2010 Royal Enfield C5 Bullet
5. A Strategy For Every Ride
6. AltRider Reviews: 2010 BMW R1200GS
7. Short Track: The Digger Helm National
8. Yamaha XT1200Z Super Ténéré

=== Final Show ===
1. 2013 BMW R1200GS, And That's a Wrap!

== Notable Interviews ==
Peckhammer interviewed, in Interview: Eddie Mulder, Racing Legend, Eddie Mulder, who is known for being a leading TT Steeplechase and desert racer of the 1960s, and a Hollywood stunt rider doubling Clint Eastwood on a motorcycle jump stunt in Magnum Force. Eddie Mulder was inducted into the AMA Motorcycle Hall of Fame in 1999. The interview took place prior to Mulder racing at the Pikes Peak International Hill Climb where he holds several records. Mulder, who was sixty-four years old at the time of the interview, discussed the altitude-related health problems he suffered after setting a record in the Vintage Class at PPIHC in 2007.

Peckhammer interviewed, in Bonneville: Passion, Endurance and Teamwork, Paul and Barbara Friebus regarding their motorcycle performances at the Bonneville Salt Flats. The Friebuses build and restore vintage motorcycles and engines and hold multiple motorcycle land speed records with their bikes. Paul Friebus' father, who set a new land speed record at the age of 83, was also interviewed.

Peckhammer did a collaborative webisode with cinematographer Stan McClain entitled, Maximum Exposure: Rigging a Motorcycle with Film Tools. Stan McClain is known for his major studio work as a 2nd unit Director of Photography and Aerial Cinematographer for TV shows such as Magnum PI, and more than fifty motion pictures.
