= The Color of Me =

2018 film

- Movie Poster
- Directed by: Sreejith Nair
- Written by: Sreejth Nair; Fahima Mohamood
- Produced by: Sreejith Nair; Rohit Gupta; Fahima Mohamood; Esha Tewari
- Starring: Eva Shah; Norma Chacon; Terell Pierce; Jennifer Lenius; Pearl Paramadilok
- Cinematography: Natalie Reinholtz
- Edited by: Earl Ulit
- Music by: Salil Bhayani
- Release date: February 14, 2018
- Running time: 20 minutes
- Country: United States
- Language: English

The Color of Me is a 2018 American family drama fantasy film that is written and directed by Sreejith Nair. It is about an adopted African American boy, Lewis Clark, who falls in love with a girl whose skin magically changes colour every hour. The film received critical acclaim and several accolades at its international festival run across the United States. It premiered at the Los Angeles CineFest with subsequent screenings at various film festivals. The film was chosen as an official selection at the Amazon Prime Studios first All Voice Film Festival 2019.

== Plot ==
An adopted African American Lewis Clark, falls in love with a young woman, Lisa Adams, who is the victim of a magical curse. The curse causes Lisa to transform into 5 different races: Caucasian, Indian, Chinese, Hispanic, and African-American.

== Cast ==
- Terrell Pierce - Lewis Clark
- Norma Chacon - Lisa Adams (Hispanic)
- Jennifer Lenius - Lisa Adams (Caucasian)
- Pearl Paramadilok - Lisa Adams (Asian)
- Eva Shah - Lisa Adams (Indian)
- Tayler Turner - Lisa Adams (African American)

== Background ==
As an Indian American, the director Sreejith Nair said:

The topic of racism and insecurity really came from the fact that I am Indian, but I am born and raised in America. Here in America, people look at me like I am a foreigner, but I don’t feel like one. In India, I don’t look like a foreigner, but I feel like one. Throughout my whole life, it seemed like I was a part of two worlds, but never completely belonged in either of them. Are there certain things I’m supposed to be doing just because I’m an Indian? I have often questioned, What if I was a black person or What if I was white?, would my life be so different?. Could I still be the same person if I wasn’t Indian? What if my skin could change color? So I wanted to write a story that asked, If I am a person of a different race or ethnicity, how much is my race supposed to define me? If I am a person of color, can I still have the freedom to be whoever I want without worrying about representing my ethnicity? I want this story to show that you can be anyone, no matter what color you are.

== Critical reception and reviews ==
"This unexpected, quirky tale explores what it means to love the skin you're in. It challenges us to explore how we alter our behavior based on the world's perceptions of us and what it would take for us to stop" as reviewed by Chimera Ensemble. Pallavi Kanmadikar of Dish Dash described the film as "a revelation, that will force you to rethink your own opinions about people" further adding "because no individual can be defined by what they look like".

Roopa Modha of Urban Asian noted, "In the era of social media boom, the issue of self-acceptance is a big one and The Color of Me speaks volumes about how we see ourselves and what we are lead to believe are the acceptable norms of the society. The movie brings to light the issues of discrimination and privilege". Jharna Malaviya in her review for The Dish Dash said, "The Color of Me approaches the question of race in a way that has never been seen before".

== Awards and nominations ==
Awards and nominations for The Color of Me
Festival/Award	Category	Outcome
LA Film Awards	Fantasy Film	Won
Global Film Festival Awards	Fantasy short film	Won
Los Angeles Cinefest	Best Short Film	Nominated
Los Angeles Cinefest	Poster Design	Nominated
LA Feedback Film Festival	Best Performances	Won
Silicon Beach Film Festival	Social Impact Award	Won
Los Angeles Independent Film Festival Awards	Best Short Film	Nominated
Hollywood International Moving Pictures Film Festival	Best Short Film	Nominated
Accolade Film Awards	Best Short Film	Won
Accolade Film Awards	Contemporary Issues / Awareness Raising	Won
Accolade Film Awards	Social Change Impact	Won
Accolade Film Awards	Creativity / Originality	Won
Accolade Film Awards	Viewer Impact	Won
Accolade Film Awards	Dramatic Impact	Won

== Official selections and screenings ==
Festival/Event	Location	Country
Santa Fe Film Festival	New Mexico	United States
Charlotte Black Film and Music Festival	Charlotte, NC	United States
Amazon Prime's All Voice Film Festival	USA	United States
Las Vegas Black Film and Music Festival	Nevada	United States
My True Colors Film Festival	New York	United States
Lake Front Film Festival	Maryland	United States
Over The Rhine Int. Film Festival	Cincinnati, OH	United States
San Francisco Black Film Festival	California	United States
Silicon Beach Film Festival	Los Angeles	United States
Austin Spotlight Film Festival	Texas	United States
Lift-off First-Time Filmmakers	USA	United States
International Black Film Festival 2019	Tennessee	United States
Los Angeles Cinefest	California	United States
Golden Door Film Festival 2019	New Jersey	United States
Hollywood International Moving Pictures Film Festival	Los Angeles	United States
Black Film Festival ATL 2019	Atlanta	United States
Los Angeles Independent Film Festival Awards	California	United States
