= Life! Camera Action... =

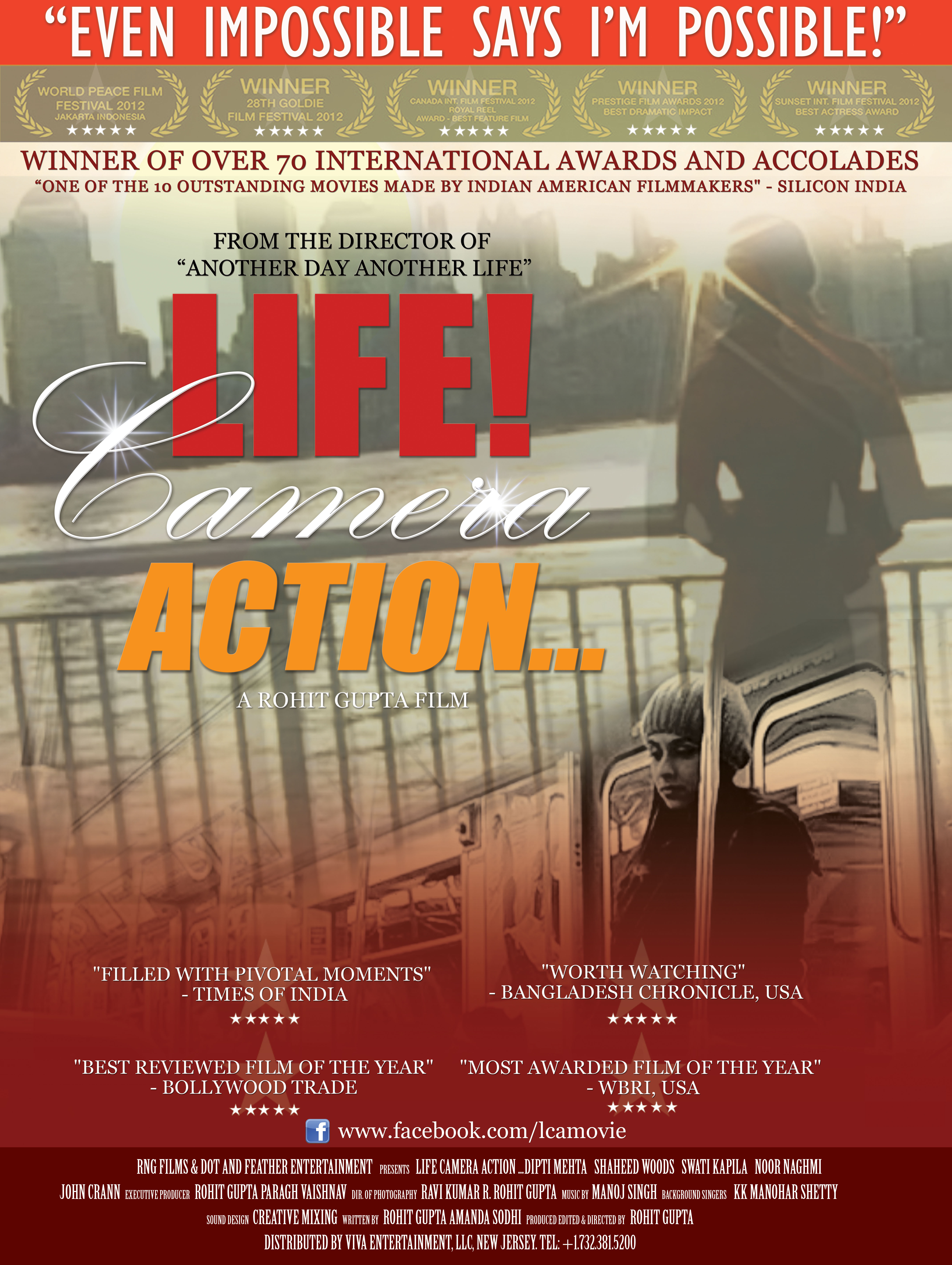
- Movie poster
- Directed by: Rohit Gupta
- Written by: Rohit Gupta; Amanda Sodhi
- Produced by: Rohit Gupta
- Starring: Dipti Mehta; Shaheed Woods; John Crann; Swati Kapila; Suneet Kochar; Noor Naghmi
- Cinematography: Ravi Kumar R
- Edited by: Rohit Gupta
- Music by: Manoj Singh
- Production companies: Dot & Feather Entertainment
- Distributed by: Viva Entertainment, USA; Flipkart (DVD), India; Distrify (online worldwide)
- Release date: 20 July 2012; United States
- Running time: 90 minutes
- Country: United States
- Languages: Hindi; Punjabi; English

Life! Camera Action... is a family-drama film directed, written, edited, produced by Rohit Gupta, in his feature-length directorial debut. Starring Dipti Mehta, Shaheed Woods, Noor Naghmi, Swati Kapila, John Crann, this ninety minutes quasi-autobiographical film follows a girl in pursuit of her dreams of becoming a filmmaker against all odds. The film received several awards and nominations. Its theatrical release was limited to film festivals. The film received direct-to-DVD release and subsequently on other video on demand (VOD) platforms.

Life! Camera Action... is of note for its extremely low filming budget ($4000), production value, philosophical inference, and its message widely praised. It made its way to the Limca Book of Records, India's equivalent of the Guinness World Records for being the first full-length motion picture "shot by just a two-member crew".

== Cast ==
- Dipti Mehta as Reina
- Shaheed Woods as Mike
- John Crann as Professor Ed
- Swati Kapila as Simi
- Suneet Kochar as Actress
- Chelsi Stahr as producer Teri
- Subodh Batra as Reina's father
- Noor Naghmi
- Prabha Batra as Reina's mother
- Nina Mehta as Actress
- Bhavesh Patel as Patel DVD store owner

== Production ==
=== Development ===
Life! Camera Action... started as Rohit Gupta's ten-minute short film assignment at the New York Film Academy. Shortly after he dropped out of the academy to make it into a full-length feature film. Amanda Sodhi, the co-writer of the film, in response to an advertisement had originally submitted a fifteen-page short film script titled "The Last Shot" loosely based on her own life.>

=== Filming ===
The film was shot in guerilla style on Panasonic AG-DVX100 in ten days and roughly edited on Gupta's Mac Book Pro. It was filmed on an initial budget of around $4000 with money raised from his savings that was cleaned up with post-production work costing several thousand dollars before its marketing and release. In an interview Dipti Mehta has said that in an informal meeting before the audition, Gupta thought she was not right for the part, although she was invited at the audition where he failed to recognize her at the first sight. Mehta did get the part and it became her debut film as a lead.

=== Filming locations ===
Various locations in New York City, New York Film Academy, Jersey City and Newport Waterfront.

=== Music ===
The background score and songs were composed by Manoj Singh. The music was produced in Mumbai, India. The following songs are featured in the film and used as a part of the background score.

=== Soundtrack ===
The score for Life! Camera Action... features two original songs.

No.	Title	Writer(s)	Artist(s)	Length
1.	"Hain Yeh Kaisa Safar (What kind of Journey is this)" (Theme Song)	Amanda Sodhi	MS	3:03
2.	"Chalte Jaana Hain (Have to keep Walking)"	Rohit Gupta	KK	4:51

== Release ==
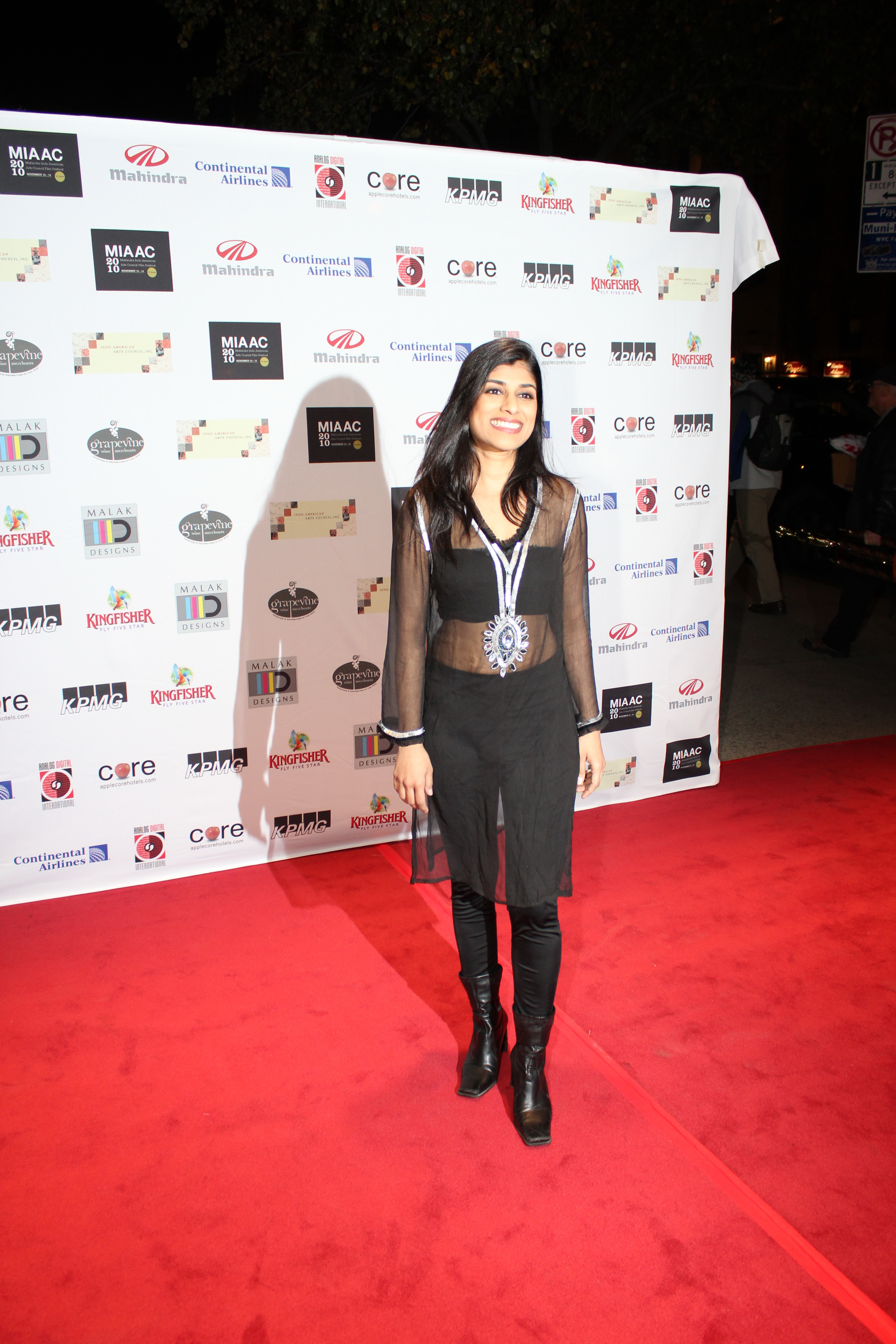
Actress Dipti Mehta at the World Premiere in New York

Life! Camera Action... opened in numerous international film festivals beginning with its world premiere at the New York Indian Film Festival. Thereafter the film went on to receive numerous accolades around the world before it received a limited DVD distribution deal on 29 October 2012 by New Jersey–based ViVa Entertainment for the Asian Indian market spanning the North American continent. It was initially released via Facebook on 20 July 2012 by Boston-based idistribute Inc., a new media distribution company. On 29 November 2012, the film received another retail DVD distribution platform via Florida-based Dynasty Records through Trans World Entertainment Corporation's national mall-based stores under the brand name FYE (For Your Entertainment), Suncoast and Wherehouse.com. Flipkart, India's largest e-commerce consumer company released the film on 17 February 2013. On International Women's Day, 8 March 2013 the film was released worldwide through Distrify, a UK-based VOD movie distribution company for online streaming and movie download in any global currency. The film was released to other VOD service such as the Amazon Video, BoxTV.

== Reception ==
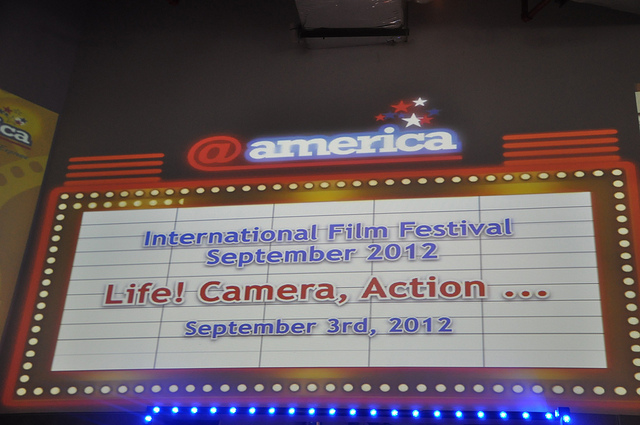
Wins Best Feature Film at the Official World Peace Film Festival in Jakarta, Indonesia

it's not just good filmmaking, it's real intelligent filmmaking.

— The Times of India

Life! Camera Action... received critical acclaim. It was invited at various international film festivals including the New York Indian Film Festival; Williamsburg International Film Festival (WILLiFest) in New York; Mississippi International Film Festival, USA; Cabo Verde International Film Festival (CVIFF), Africa; International Film Festival Antigua & Barbuda; Official World Peace Film Festival, Indonesia; Golden Door Film Festival in USA; Ionian International Film Festival in Greece; Indian International Film Festival of Tampa Bay; Carmarthen Bay International Film Festival in United Kingdom; Treasure Coast International Film Festival, USA; The Social Uprising Resistance and Grass Root Encouragement International Film Festival, in the United States;NFDC Film Bazaar in Goa; Beloit International Film Festival; Filums (LUMS International Film Festival), Pakistan; Boston's Museum of Fine Arts (MFA) South Asian Film Series, USA; Heart of England International Film Festival; Dhaka International Film Festival (Cinema of the World section), Bangladesh; Legacy Media Institute International Film Festival, Virginia; Delhi International Film Festival, India; International Youth Film Festival in the UK; Silent River Film Festival, USA; and others.

== Awards and nominations ==
The film received various accolades including some of the highest honors at its festival run, with the nominations categories mainly ranging from recognition of the film itself (Best Film) to its direction, Film editing, music, screenwriting to the cast's acting performance, mainly Dipti Mehta (Best Actress), Swati Kapila (Best Supporting Actress), Noor Naghmi (Best Supporting Actor) and Shaheed Woods (Best Actor).

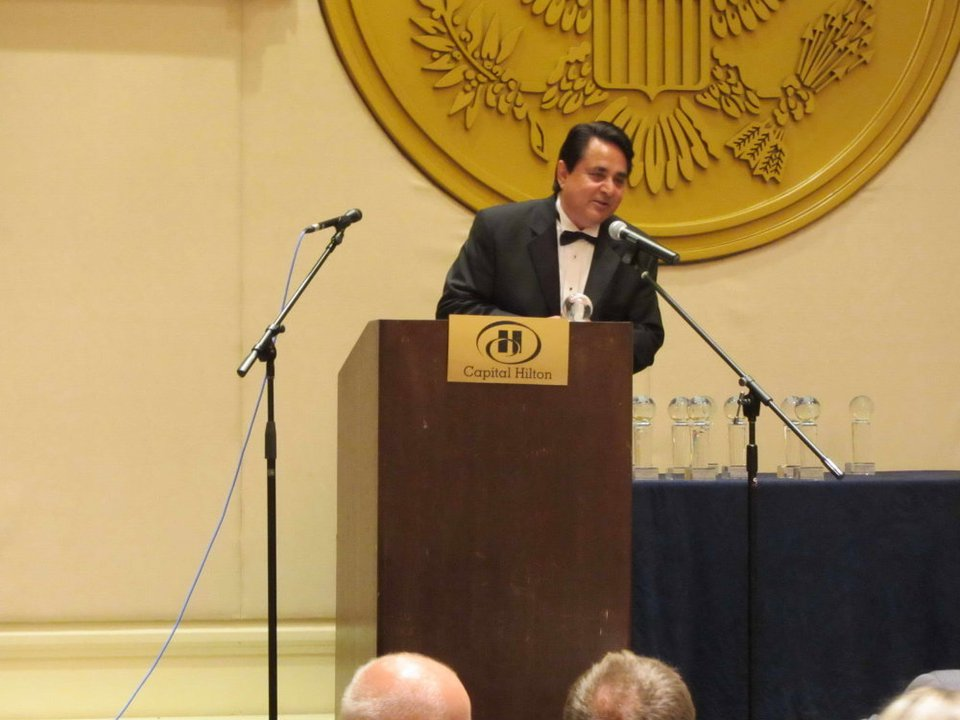
Actor Noor Naghmi wins Best Supporting Actor in Washington D.C.

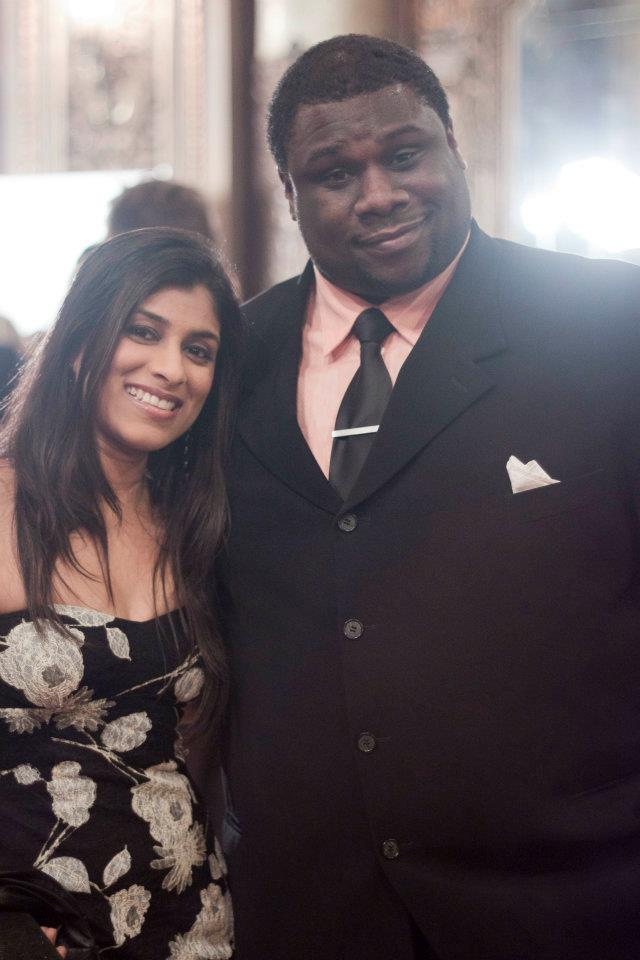
Actor Shaheed Woods and Actress Dipti Mehta at the New Jersey Premiere

Awards and nominations for Life! Camera Action...
Festival/Award	Location	Category	Recipients and nominees	Outcome
Accolade Film Awards	USA	Award of Excellence – Best Feature Film	Life! Camera Action...	Won
Accolade Film Awards	USA	Award of Merit for Direction	Rohit Gupta	Won
Accolade Film Awards	USA	Award of Merit for Cinematography	Ravi Kumar R.	Won
Accolade Film Awards	USA	Award of Merit for Dramatic Impact	Life! Camera Action...	Won
Action On Film International Film Festival	USA	Best Composition	Manoj Singh	Nominated
Action On Film International Film Festival	USA	Best Art Direction	Ravi Kumar R.	Nominated
California Film Awards	USA	Orson Welles Award for Best Narrative Film	Life! Camera Action...	Won
Canada International Film Festival	Canada	Royal Reel Award for Best Feature Film	Life! Camera Action...	Won
Carmarthen Bay Film Festival	UK	Best Feature Film	Life! Camera Action...	Nominated
Golden Door Film Festival	USA	Best Feature Film	Life! Camera Action...	Nominated
Golden Door Film Festival	USA	Best Director	Rohit Gupta	Nominated
Golden Door Film Festival	USA	Best Male Lead	Shaheed Woods	Nominated
Golden Door Film Festival	USA	Best Female Lead	Dipti Mehta	Nominated
28th Goldie Film Awards	USA	Best feature film	Life! Camera Action...	Won
28th Goldie Film Awards	USA	Best Director	Rohit Gupta	Won
28th Goldie Film Awards	USA	Best Actress	Dipti Mehta	Won
28th Goldie Film Awards	USA	Best Supporting Actor	Shaheed Woods	Won
28th Goldie Film Awards	USA	Best Cinematography	Ravi Kumar R.	Won
28th Goldie Film Awards	USA	Best Song Chalte Jaana Hain	KK (Singer), Manoj Singh	Won
28th Goldie Film Awards	USA	Best Screenplay	Rohit Gupta, Amanda Sodhi	Won
28th Goldie Film Awards	USA	Best Editing	Rohit Gupta	Won
Indie Fest	USA	Award of Merit – Feature film	Life! Camera Action...	Won
International World Peace Film Festival	Indonesia	Best Newcomer film	Life! Camera Action...	Won
International Filmmaker Festival of World Cinema	UK	Best Film of the Festival	Life! Camera Action...	Nominated
International Filmmaker Festival of World Cinema	UK	Best Director	Rohit Gupta	Nominated
International Filmmaker Festival of World Cinema	UK	Best Supporting Actress	Swati Kapila	Nominated
Los Angeles Movie Awards	USA	Award of Excellence for Best Experimental Film	Life! Camera Action...	Won
Nevada International Film Festival	USA	Platinum Reel Award for Best Narrative Feature Film	Life! Camera Action...	Won
Oregon Film Awards	USA	Grand Jury Choice Award for Best Film	Life! Camera Action...	Won
Prestige Film Awards	USA	Gold Award – Originality & Creativity	Life! Camera Action...	Won
Prestige Film Awards	USA	Gold Award – Leading Actress	Dipti Mehta	Won
Prestige Film Awards	USA	Silver Award – Dramatic Impact	Life! Camera Action...	Won
Silent River Film Festival	USA	River Pursuit Award for Best Film	Life! Camera Action...	Won
Silent River Film Festival	USA	Best Actress	Dipti Mehta	Nominated
Silent River Film Festival	USA	River Amulet Award for Best Director	Rohit Gupta	Won
Sunset International Film Festival	USA	Best Female Actor	Dipti Mehta	Won
The World Independent Film Festival (TWIFF)	USA	Best Inspirational Family Drama	Life! Camera Action...	Won
Toronto Independent Film & Video Awards	Canada	Best Experimental Film	Life! Camera Action...	Nominated
World Music & Independent Film Festival	USA	Best Drama	Life! Camera Action...	Nominated
World Music & Independent Film Festival	USA	Best Director	Rohit Gupta	Nominated
World Music & Independent Film Festival	USA	Best Actress	Dipti Mehta	Nominated
World Music & Independent Film Festival	USA	Best Original Music	Manoj Singh	Won
World Music & Independent Film Festival	USA	Best Screenplay	Rohit Gupta, Amanda Sodhi	Nominated
World Music & Independent Film Festival	USA	Best Actor in Supporting Role	Noor Naghmi	Won
World Music & Independent Film Festival	USA	Best Actress in Supporting Role	Swati Kapila	Nominated
Yosemite International Film Awards	USA	Grand Jury Choice Award for Best Film	Life! Camera Action...	Won

== Selected Official selections and screenings ==
Festival/Event	Location	Country
New York Indian Film Festival	New York, New York	USA
Williamsburg International Film Festival	Brooklyn, New York	USA
Toronto International Film Awards	Toronto	Canada
Golden Door International Film Festival	Jersey City	USA
India International Film Festival of Tampa Bay	Florida	USA
Carmarthen Bay International Film Festival	Wales	UK
Ioninan International Film Festival	Lefkas	Greece
Treasure Coast International Film Festival	Florida	USA
World Peace International Film Festival	Jakarta	Indonesia
Social Uprising Resistance and Grass Root Encouragement IFF	Austin, Texas	USA
NFDC Film Bazaar	Goa	India
Boston's Museum of Fine Arts (MFA)	Boston	USA
Heart of England International Film Festival	Coventry	UK
Dhaka International Film Festival	Dhaka	Bangladesh
Legacy Media Institute International Film Festival	Virginia	USA
Delhi International Film Festival	Delhi	India
International Youth Film Festival	London	UK
Silent River Film Festival	California	USA
Action on Film International Film Festival	California	USA
International Film Festival Antigua & Barbuda	Antigua & Barbuda	West Indies
Nevada International Film Festival	Las Vegas	USA
Love Unlimited Film Festival and Art Exhibition	Texas	USA
Filums (LUMS International Film Festival)	Lahore	Pakistan
Love Unlimited Film Festival and Art Exhibition	California	USA
Sunset International Film Festival	Los Angeles	USA
The World Independent Film Festival	San Jose	USA
Cabo Verde International Film Festival	Sal Island	Cape Verde
World Music & Independent Film Festival	D.C.	USA
International Filmmaker Festival of World Cinema	London	UK
Barossa International Film Festival	Tanunda	Australia
Bayou City Inspirational Film Festival	Texas	USA
International Film Festival for Peace, Inspiration and Equality	Jakarta	Indonesia
Yosemite International Film Festival	Yosemite	USA
Indie Fest	San Diego	USA

== Limca Book of records ==
Record	Honoring body
Film Life! Camera Action... was shot by just a two-member crew consisting of director/producer Rohit Gupta & Ravi Kumar R.	Limca Book of Records

== See also ==
- The Pursuit of Happyness
- Go for it! India
- Bend It Like Beckham
- August Rush
- 3 Idiots
- October Sky
