= Ghostly Encounters =

Canadian television series

- Genre: Documentary; Paranormal
- Created by: Phyllis Platt
- Presented by: Lawrence Chau
- Starring: Lawrence Chau
- Country of origin: Canada
- Original language: English
- No. of seasons: 4
- No. of episodes: 81

Production
- Executive producer: Phyllis Platt
- Producer: Brian Dennis
- Running time: 22 minutes
- Production company: Platt Productions

Original release
- Network: Viva/W Network
- Release: July 16, 2005 – January 19, 2011

Ghostly Encounters is a Canadian paranormal documentary television series that premiered on July 16, 2005 to January 19, 2011. on Viva/W Network. The program also aired on A&E's The Biography Channel, and currently airs on Discovery's Destination America, both in the United States. The show was created by executive producer Phyllis Platt, is produced by Brian Dennis, and is hosted by Lawrence Chau.

The program uses a combination of interviews and dramatic recreations, examining the events that led its subjects to accept or reject occurrences as supernatural, and how the experience has helped or hindered them.

Ghostly Encounters won a Gemini Award for best original score in 2007.

== Format ==
Each episode usually tells stories from two individuals who believe they have had paranormal experiences. When warranted, however, the show will break from this format and instead use the full episode for one story. Each episode is created using a direct-to-camera interview with the storyteller, dramatic re-enactments, and host segments and commentary. An abandoned ballroom on the top floor of the King Edward Hotel in Toronto provides the location for the portion of the program featuring host Lawrence Chau.

The episodes begin with a tease, briefly describing the two stories. The tease is followed by the opening credits, which are accompanied by the theme music. After the credits, the first story is introduced using a clip of the subject's interview. The first host segment follows and introduces the theme of the episode, as well as the first story, to the viewers. The first subject's story is then told using a combination of his or her interview and dramatic re-enactment footage. Occasionally, b-roll and stock footage are also used in telling the story. At the end of the first story, a brief host segment wraps up the first subject and introduces the second subject of the episode. The second story follows the same format as the first and ends again with a wrap-up from the host. At the same time, the host also wraps up the show and includes final comments on the stories and theme of the episode based on the commentary from the experts. The show ends with a final comment from each subject, usually reflecting on the lesson their encounter has given them, followed by the closing credits.

== Episodes ==
=== Season 1 (2005) ===
No.	Title	Original release date
1	"Someone to Watch Over Me"	July 16, 2005
Grieving people are helped by a supposed visit from a loved one. From beyond the grave, dead loved ones comfort the bereaved Pauline and Stacey.
2	"Father Knows Best"	July 23, 2005
A deceased father and a sister supposedly make an appearance. Mitch's dead father and Salwa's ghostly sister return to tell the two how to live their lives.
3	"The Believer and the Doubter"	July 30, 2005
A former employer's ghost supposedly appears to a woman. Anita keeps seeing ghosts but refuses to believe in them. But when Suzanne sees the spectre of her dead employer, she's all too happy to embrace the supernatural.
4	"Horror in the Basement"	August 6, 2005
A supposedly haunted house in which something horrible happened in the basement many years ago. The Carmichael family haunted for 30 years by a ghost that sprang from some unspeakable terror in their basement.
5	"Uninvited Housemates"	August 13, 2005
A house is supposedly haunted by a former occupant, and a teen in the home is thrilled rather than frightened by the experience. Geri is horrified to discover a ghost lives with her, but a teenage Jackie is delighted to share her house with its long-dead former occupants.
6	"Angels and Demons"	August 20, 2005
A couple's supposed encounters with both good and bad spiritual beings lead to a religious awakening. Encounters with spiritual beings--good and evil--lead Carolyn and Eric back to God.
7	"Ghostly Warfare"	August 27, 2005
People fight back against evil spirits that supposedly haunt their homes. Victor and Katrina fight back against the malignant spirits threatening their homes, and even their lives.
8	"Growing Up Ghostly"	September 3, 2005
Profiling sisters who claim to have seen ghosts since childhood. After having supernatural experiences as children, Charlotte and Tamara both continue to see ghosts for the rest of their lives.
9	"Phantoms Between Friends"	September 10, 2005
Three friends recall supposed supernatural encounters. Three friends, Tina, Louise and Lisa, experience the supernatural in different ways, with different responses to the strange things they've seen.
10	"Angels on the Highway"	September 17, 2005
Highway encounters with supposed angelic apparitions. The open highway becomes a journey into the unexplained when Paul and Diana encounter angelic beings that change their lives.
11	"Ghosts in the Blood"	September 24, 2005
Two individuals who come from families that supposedly see spirits are the focus. Deborah and Jay both come from families that see spirits, and both have had ghostly encounters of their own.
12	"The Ghostly Catalyst"	October 1, 2005
Two different experiences are recalled. One is a supposedly friendly visitation by a ghost; and the other more sinister. A friendly ghost influences Stephen to end his marriage, while a malicious ghost makes Chris decide to move.
13	"When Kids See Ghosts"	October 8, 2005
A girl claims to see a ghost, but her father doesn't believe her; and a young man claims to see a ghost in an old dormitory. Lesley is traumatized when her father doesn't believe she's seen a ghost, while young Lance's family takes it in stride when he sees a phantom in an old dormitory.

=== Season 2 (2006) ===
No.	Title	Original release date
14	"The Journey Back From Death"	March 11, 2006
Near-death experiences are discussed with two individuals who claim to have been to the other side. Two people who have been to the other side tell of the supernatural experiences surrounding their own deaths. As a young girl, Katherine encounters a brilliant white light accompanied by a voice as she lies dying on an operating table. Twelve years old at the time, something within the white light gave her the opportunity to choose life or to choose death. She chose life, and then chose to use that life for good, as part of Angels Anonymous. Don has spent his life terrified of water. He was finally able to figure out why when he visited a strange town and discovered he was the reincarnation of a boy who had drowned the day he was born.
15	"My Dad's Ghost Saved My Mom's Life"	March 18, 2006
Purported messages from long-dead fathers and their impact on their living former spouses are discussed. Barbara's father had loved morse code and numerology, and one night she heard strange systematic tapping, and figured it was him sending her a message, but couldn't figure out what the message was. Then her mom, living in Montreal, had a heart attack. The doctors said it wasn't serious, and not to bother traveling, but Barbara knew the tapping was telling her to go. She dropped everything and went. By the time she got there, her mom was almost dead, but then suddenly she had a miraculous recovery. Elsie lost her dad six years ago, and grieved heavily. On the anniversary of his death, she was looking at a picture of him on a table, when it moved toward her. Because of this, she's learned to listen to the spirits. So, when Elsie woke suddenly one night and felt compelled to tell her healthy mom to see a doctor right away, she phoned immediately. The next morning her mom went, where they discovered a blood clot that would have killed her within 24 hours had she not gone.
16	"Refuge in Rosaries"	March 25, 2006
Catholic rosaries are used to ward off supernatural threats.
17	"'Til Death Do Us Part"	April 1, 2006
Ghostly experiences from childhood are recalled by two sisters.
18	"Waterly Awakenings"	April 8, 2006
Ghosts with unfinished work are discussed.
19	"Anorexia and the Haunting Hag"	April 15, 2006
Six years of ghostly visits, anorexia and sleep deprivation have caused a young woman's health to deteriorate.
20	"Living in a Haunted House"	April 22, 2006
Haunted-house experiences are discussed.
21	"Ghosts of the Murdered"	April 29, 2006
Ghosts of murder victims are discussed.
22	"Phantoms of the Philippines"	May 6, 2006
Spirits from the Philippines are investigated during this look at two cases.
23	"Graves Undug and Graves Disturbed"	May 13, 2006
Neighborhood ghost sightings are alleged after an Indian burial ground is disturbed.
24	"Ghosts in the Workplace"	May 20, 2006
Two women discover supernatural activity at their jobs.
25	"Undying Love"	May 27, 2006
Two people believe their deceased mothers have returned from the grave.
26	"People Who See Ghosts of Trauma"	June 3, 2006
A lump of coal from the Titanic leads to a paranormal experience.
27	"A Family Torn Apart by a Haunted House"	June 10, 2006
A frightened family believes their home is haunted.
28	"The Price of Disbelief"	June 17, 2006
Nobody believes Kendra Lee and Aaron when they claim to have had horrifying supernatural experiences as children.
29	"When Folk Tales Come True"	June 24, 2006
Georgia and Ravi discuss alleged supernatural experiences mirroring cultural folk tales from Greece and South Asia.
30	"Danger Detectors From the Great Beyond"	July 1, 2006
Two people believe ghosts have attempted to warn them of imminent danger.
31	"The House that Tweedie Built and Never Left"	July 8, 2006
The deceased owner of an old farmhouse still walks its halls, according to the family living there.
32	"Paranormal Pathways"	July 15, 2006
A look at pathways and trails that are purportedly haunted. Included: an old Aboriginal Canadian footpath in Toronto.
33	"Ghosts That Save Lives"	July 22, 2006
Honey Sherman believes a ghost saved her son's life; Robert Algeo claims a ghost protected him during a deadly industrial accident.
34	"Scared to Go Home"	July 29, 2006
Paranormal occurrences in two homes scare the residents from returning.
35	"Tombs and Temples of the Dead"	August 5, 2006
Ghost sightings near a temple and a graveyard are discussed.
36	"Condemned Judge"	August 12, 2006
A couple speculate about the ghost of a judge who they believe haunted their first home.
37	"Ghosts That Banish Nightmares"	August 19, 2006
Two people discuss how ghosts helped put an end to their disturbing nightmares.
38	"The Ghost That Hates Women"	August 26, 2006
A woman claims a misogynistic ghost haunts her childhood home.
39	"Generational Spirits"	September 2, 2006
People discuss purported ghostly visits from their ancestors.

=== Season 3 (2009) ===
No.	Title	Original release date
40	"Ghosts as Protectors"	June 20, 2009
Recalling supposed interventions by good ghosts who protect people from malevolent spirits.
41	"Connection to the Land"	June 27, 2009
Included: at a prehistoric excavation site, a man believes he sees an apparition of a man; and a man claims to see his late uncle at a Muskoka, Ontario, lodge.
42	"Buildings With History"	July 4, 2009
Supposed workplace sightings are recalled, including a claim that ghosts were seen at a hotel that was the site of a fire years earlier.
43	"Haunted Hospitals"	July 11, 2009
Supposedly haunted hospitals are discussed. Included: a woman claims to see the ghost of a boy watching over her newborn; and a supposed sighting at a school that once was an infirmary.
44	"Ghostly Muses"	July 18, 2009
A scary experience with a wraith inspires a dancer to become a better performer; a ghost inspires a musician to write songs for a band.
45	"A House Divided"	July 25, 2009
An allegedly haunted mansion in Detroit is home to two ghosts. One is pleasant and stays on the upper level, while the other one is menacing and dwells in the basement, where a woman reportedly stashed her husband's dead body.
46	"Ghosts of the Aged"	August 1, 2009
Elderly apparitions are recalled. Included: a supposed encounter with a grandmother. Also: a woman claims to see the gnarled face of an old woman on her boyfriend.
47	"Passive and Aggressive"	August 8, 2009
Two very different encounters, one aggressive and one passive, that force people to leave their homes, are recalled.
48	"Forever My Daughter"	August 15, 2009
Deceased loved ones and supposed connections with family are explored. Included: a woman claims that her mother's ring, which was left on top of her grave, is found miles away; and a woman claims her deceased father appeared at her door with a message.
49	"Ghosts and Legends"	August 22, 2009
Sightings of legendary ghosts are examined. Included: two men in Dominica claim to see a soucouyant, a supposed local spirit disguised as an old woman; and a woman sees a bearded ghost who's part of Newfoundland folklore.
50	"One Foot in the Spirit World"	August 29, 2009
A woman whose twin brother died and whom she believes is still with her believes ghosts are attracted to her; and a woman who had a near-death experience claims she's haunted by a Hawaiian medicine man.
51	"Dead on the Job"	September 5, 2009
Tales of ghosts at the workplace are recalled. Included: a claim about seeing the ghost of a vaudeville performer in a theater; and a supposed haunting by a man who died in an accident.
52	"Hounded to Hell"	September 12, 2009
The story of a man who claims that a ghost drove him from his home in Tucson, and is following him on the road, bringing him to the brink of insanity.
53	"Good Samaritan Ghosts"	September 19, 2009
Benevolent-ghost stories include a woman who is supposedly helped by a ghost in a diner who listens to her talk about her divorce; and a trucker whose apparition appears as a fellow trucker who gives him some words of comfort. Kelley and Ron both come face-to-face with ghosts that guide them through hard times. Kelley meets an unusual man in a diner and begins to open up again after her recent divorce. Ron, a trucker, helps a mysterious colleague out of a storm and gets a comforting message in return.
54	"Light on the Past"	September 26, 2009
A renovation of a home supposedly stirs up several ghosts, including angry men, a peaceful young woman, and a baby. When Erin's family starts to renovate their new country home, the house's long and storied past comes to light. Erin is haunted by the ghosts of angry men storming through the halls at night, the ghost of a peaceful and comforting young woman, and by the ghost of a baby. Erin's suspicions about the ghosts' connection to the house are confirmed when her father discovers clues to the home's past hidden in the walls.
55	"Ghostly Guidance Counselors"	October 3, 2009
Encounters that guide careers are recalled. Included: a man who saw ghosts as a child uses his experiences to start a career; and a man who makes a surprising discovery at a ghost tour. Kyle and Chris both experience ghostly activity that guides their careers. After Kyle started a ghost tour at a Fort in Niagara-on-the-Lake, he was surprised to learn that his stories had more truth to them then he previously believed. Chris was tormented by ghosts in his childhood home, but eventually harnessed his fear to start a fascinating career.
56	"Buried Secrets"	October 10, 2009
The secret past of Patrick's childhood home torments him for years before he finally discovers its shocking source.
57	"Closing the Door to the Beyond"	October 17, 2009
Two neighbors are visited by the ghost of a child; and a woman has paranormal experiences after using tarot cards.
58	"Tempting Ghosts"	October 24, 2009
A trip on the Texas Road, a roadway in Ontario that some believe is haunted.
59	"Ghostly Possession"	October 31, 2009
Scott and Lise witness terrifying spirits who take over the bodies of people in their homes.
60	"Religious Ghosts"	November 7, 2009
Religious encounters are recalled. Included: an Indian woman is rescued from a spirit by Krishna; and a Jewish woman living in a predominantly Catholic neighborhood has an encounter.
61	"Comfort from Beyond the Grave"	November 14, 2009
Ghosts that bring comfort to those who have lost loved ones.
62	"Caretaker Ghosts"	November 21, 2009
Ghosts attached to places are the subject. Included: A man encounters the ghost of his home's architect; and another man meets a spirit who resides at the local park.
63	"Stay at Home Ghosts"	November 28, 2009
A woman's deceased grandfather returns to his home; a woman finds comfort in knowing her home is haunted by its previous owner.
64	"Soldier Ghosts"	December 5, 2009
The ghosts of soldiers who deliver messages is the subject. Included: a man thinks a visitation is connected with the death of his grandfather, a veteran; a woman receives a message from a soldier who was killed in the War of 1812.
65	"Remember Me"	December 12, 2009
The ghosts of relatives return to haunt family members. Included: a man is haunted by his father's ghost; and a woman is visited by the spirit of her grandfather.

=== Season 4 (2010–11) ===
No.	Title	Original release date
66	"Kids Who See Ghosts"	September 25, 2010
Young Ross sees ghosts that his parents don't, and Kelsey's son plays with a ghostly friend.
67	"Play with the occult, pay the price"	October 2, 2010
Sharon Hayward played with a ouija board and started encountering a black rode figure at her house; Greg Cairns played with a ouija board when he was young and experience an attack by a dark figure in his bedroom.
68	"Hospital Ghosts"	October 9, 2010
Dan McIsaac encountered the ghosts of patients while working at a hospital; Stephen Flynn encountered the ghost of a woman in his house he believed has followed his wife home from the hospital where she works.
69	"Protecting Kids from Ghosts"	October 16, 2010
Pauline is tormented by ghosts and so is Kim Lapierre's daughter, but Pauline’s mother and Kim find a way to protect them. Pauline was brought to a temple for a blessing and given a bracklet for protection. Kim bought a necklace to give her daughter peace of mind.
70	"Disturbed Graves"	October 23, 2010
Dan Pond and Susan Gorrell are haunted by ghosts when nearby gravesites are disturbed.
71	"Haunted Institutions"	November 5, 2010
Yvonne Boyer and Carol Grant visit historical institutions and discover they're haunted.
72	"Crimes From Beyond The Grave"	November 12, 2010
Kiersten Johnston is haunted by ghosts of a crime committed in her apartment.
73	"Eternal Bonds"	November 19, 2010
Jen Potvin and Maria Thompson both have strong bonds with family members that continue into the afterlife
74	"Driven Out By Ghosts"	November 26, 2010
Penny and Rassool are driven from their homes by terrifying ghosts.
75	"History Comes Alive"	November 27, 2010
Chuck Beavis and John Quick both encounter ghosts that change the way they connect to history.
76	"When Parents Don't Believe"	December 4, 2010
Andrew McVicar and Donna Marshall both experienced a supernatural experience as children. Their parents didn't believe them. These are their stories.
77	"Lost Children of the Halifax Explosion"	December 11, 2010
Sandra Gardiner and Sandra Church are haunted by ghosts from the Halifax Explosion.
78	"Ghosts and the Vulnerable"	December 18, 2010
Nick LeBlanc and Christina Parker are haunted by ghosts during a vulnerable period in their life.
79	"Teenagers and Ghosts"	January 7, 2011
Kaitlyn Clark and Steve Chartier are both targeted by ghosts in their teenage years
80	"Ghosts and Halifax Explosion"	January 8, 2011
Sheila Smith encounters ghosts who lost their way after the Halifax Explosion.
81	"Ghosts Who Died Violently"	January 15, 2011
Ashley Hunter and Daniel Archambault see ghosts that appeared in the wake of violent deaths.
82	"Renos Release Ghosts"	January 22, 2011
Kathryn Robson and Dave Herrington are haunted by ghosts that are set free by home renovations.
83	"Puppet Master"	January 29, 2011
A spirit brings Colleen Costa's doll to life.

== See also ==
- List of ghost films
