= ITSA Film Festival =

Film festival

- Location: Tuolumne County, California, United States
- Established: 2010
- Founded by: Christina and David Wilkinson

The ITSA Film Festival is an annual film festival that takes place in Tuolumne County, California near Yosemite National Park. It is a multi-day event featuring short films and animations from around the world and includes film-related panel discussions, workshops, and live performances. Official selections range from A-list directors and industry professionals, to students and emerging independent filmmakers. Awards and prizes are given for 'Best of Show' in five genre categories, with an additional award for Outstanding Film, Outstanding Student Filmmaker, and honorable mentions in each category.

== About ==
ITSA Film Festival was founded in 2010 by Christina and David Wilkinson to support the film club at Connections Visual & Performing Arts Academy. 25 invitation-only filmmakers were invited to show their films and animations at the inaugural event. In 2011, ITSA Film festival opened submissions to all filmmakers. 22 world premieres, and two United States premieres were presented. 66 films were shown at the 2011 festival, including exclusive screenings of the 2011 Emerging Cinematographer Awards Honoree Films.

=== Awards offered ===
- Best Documentary Film
- Best Animated Film
- Best Comedic Film
- Best Dramatic Film
- Best Young Filmmaker
- Outstanding Film (Grand prize winner)
- Outstanding Student Filmmaker
