= Rohit Gupta =

Indian-American film director

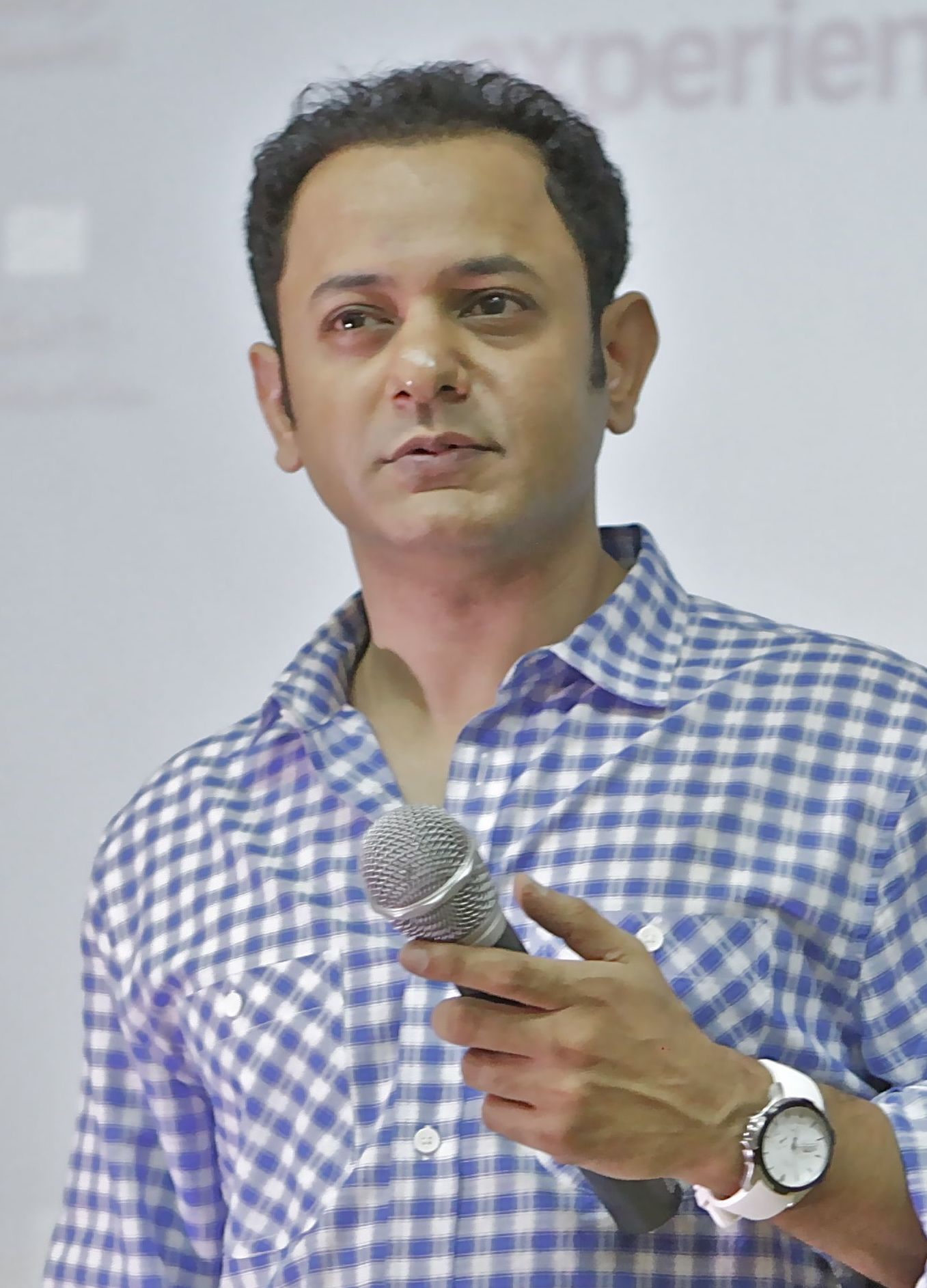
- Born: Rohit Gupta; Bombay, India
- Education: Wingate University, North Carolina (M.B.A.); New York Film Academy
- Occupations: Film director; Film producer; Entrepreneur
- Years active: 2009–present
- Website: dotandfeatherfilms.com

Rohit Gupta (pronounced [ˈroːɦɪt̪ ɡuːptə]) is a film director, producer and entrepreneur who resides in the United States. He is known for directing Midnight Delight, Life! Camera Action..., Another Day Another Life, winning several awards & nominations. Gupta is the founder and owner of Dot & Feather Entertainment production company, Film Festivals To Go (FFTG), and FFTG Awards Film Fest.

== Film career ==
Born into a business family in Bombay, present-day Mumbai, Gupta earned his MBA from Wingate University in North Carolina before taking a short filmmaking course at the New York Film Academy. The initial film assignments he was working on for classes became inspiration for later works. His first film Another Day Another Life a four-minute suspense thriller flick was chosen as an official selection at the Short Film Corner - Cannes Film Festival in 2009. The attention the film received prompted Gupta to continue building a film career. New York Film Academy offered Gupta scholarship to extend his stay in to the one-year program. He shot his first feature, the inspiring family-drama movie Life! Camera Action... with a two-member crew in three languages English, Hindi, Punjabi as part of the story. Gupta followed with a comedy feature Midnight Delight.

== Honors and appearances ==
In 2010, Gupta was invited to speak at the Sensoria, an annual week-long film event held every year in Charlotte, North Carolina, where education connects with professionals creating cinematic magic in Hollywood. At Sensoria George Cochran, the event founder & a former Directors Guild of America commercial film director and Vice Chairman of the North Carolina Film Office honored and felicitated Gupta as an industry leader and mentor for the students of the Central Piedmont Community College Arts and filmmaking department. Gupta was again invited to speak at Sensoria in 2012 to share, as quoted by Sarah Perry, "how he made a five-minute film for $100 called Another Day Another Life that a little festival called Cannes chose as an official selection; and how his other film Life! Camera Action... has toured the world and won top awards at renowned festivals".

In 2011, Gupta was invited as a special guest speaker at the launch of the New York Film Academy's first open house session in India. The event was held at the Four Seasons Hotel, Mumbai. He is credited for being the first alumnus of the New York Film Academy to have made a short film assignment in to a full-length feature film, while in the program.

In 2012, Gupta was invited as an honorary member on the Global Artistic Advisory Board of the World Music & Independent Film Festival based in Washington, D.C.

Gupta is listed in the Limca Book of Records, India's equivalent of the Guinness World Records, for creating a national record for the first Indian to shoot a full-length motion picture by just a "two-member crew".

In 2013, Symbiosis International University in Pune invited Gupta for a guest lecture on Management & Creative aspects of filmmaking. A SIMColloquium, where eminent speakers from the field of media and communication come to interact with students and enable them to understand how the industry works was organized for Gupta's interaction with the Symbiosis Institute of Media and Communications (SIMC) students.

Gupta was chosen by Times Now as one of five global Indian nominated from around the world for the "2014 NRI of the Year" award for his "Distinctive Global Achievement in Arts & Entertainment".

Gupta was invited to be on the jury for Charlotte 48 Hour Film Project in North Carolina for three years in a row (2014, 2015 & 2016).

In May 2015, Indian Institute of Management Bangalore, invited Gupta as speaker for the seminar titled "Life! Camera Action...". Later in the year, SAE Institute in Dubai invited Gupta to address a seminar to its filmmaking and multimedia students.

== Filmography ==
†	Denotes films that have not yet been released

Year	Film	Director	Producer	Writer	Editor	Other credits	Language
2009	Another Day Another Life	Yes	Yes		Yes		English
2011	Just Do It!	Yes	Yes	Yes	Yes		English
2012	Life! Camera Action...	Yes	Yes	Yes	Yes		Hindi, Punjabi, English
2013	Corridor		Yes				English
2016	Midnight Delight	Yes	Yes	Yes	Yes		English
2018	The Color of Me		Yes				English
2018	Survive or Die		Yes			consulting producer	English
2019	The Mosquito Philosophy		Yes			consulting producer	Tamil
2021	Hawa Singh †	Yes				associate director	Hindi
2022	Rocketry: The Nambi Effect					head - global distribution	Hindi, Eng, Tamil, Telugu, Kannada, Malayalam

== See also ==
- Indians in the New York City metropolitan region
