= World Music & Independent Film Festival =

- Location: Washington, D.C., United States
- Founded: 2010
- No. of films: 2000
- Website: www.wmiff.net

World Music & Independent Film Festival (WMIFF) is an international film festival that takes place annually in Washington D.C.. Held in the third week of August the seven-day festival is a showcase of independent filmmakers and musicians from around the world.

== History ==
WMIFF was established in 2010 by actor, producer Master June Daguiso to celebrate and provide a platform of achievements for international cinema artists. Dedicated to building a global film community and supporting emerging filmmakers, WMIFF offers all selected artists exceptional exposure with an inclusive vibe that has won over alumni, attendees, and industry members alike. WMIFF festivities are open to all, featuring some of the most talented artists in both film and music.

The inaugural year of 2010 was attended by notable celebrities including Academy Award winning actor Louis Gossett Jr, Actress Cynthia Rothrock, Actor Tray Chaney, Filipino experimental guitarist and actor, Edrew Cardano, Tibetan music composer and Grammy Award nominee Nawang Khechog, Filmmaker Al Sutton, Actor Warrington Gillette of Friday The 13th Part 2 fame, Actor Robert Z’Dar.

At each festival a number of awards are given by an international jury. This week-long festival highlights includes opening and closing night celebrations, a festival centerpiece presentation, special spotlight on South East Asia Films, International music videos, concluding with a Red Carpet Black tie event held at the Washington Plaza Hotel in Washington D.C. The festival attracts celebrities, media journalists, civic and community leaders, film crews and film enthusiasts from around the globe, as well as the D.C. metropolitan area which includes Virginia and Maryland. In the last fours years attendees included award-winning personalities including Academy Award nominee singer-songwriter Carol Connors, Grammy Award Winner Nawang Khechong, filmmaker Rohit Gupta, Emmy Award Winners David Lago and Merrie Lynn Ross, two times Grammy Award nominated musician Cisco Steel, Award-winning Actress Dipti Mehta. and Steven Bauer best known for Scarface and Ray Donovan.

== See also ==
- Film Festivals
- Sundance Film Festival
- List of film festivals
