= India International Film Festival of Tampa Bay =

The India International Film Festival (IIFF) of Tampa Bay takes place annually in Tampa, Florida. IIFF's mission is to provide "a platform for increased awareness of Indian cinema and culture to the community by promoting films and industry professionals representing the diversity of India." The films featured at the festival include feature films, short films, and documentaries that are produced by Indians, films with Indian actors or actresses, or films with Indian themes. The festival takes place over the course of three days and includes a red carpet, Indian food, and various entertainment, including music and dance performances.

The fourth annual festival took place February 15, 2013 to February 17, 2013.

== History ==
IIFF was founded by Francis Vayalumkal, Rahul Korlipara, and Rachna Dinkar in February, 2010. It was originally sponsored by the Indo-US Chamber of Commerce.

There were approximately 3,000 attendees in 2012, 2,500 attendees in 2011, and 1,000 attendees in 2010.

== 2013 Film Screenings ==
Title	Director	Cast
Listen Amaya	Avinash Kumar Singh	
Yoga Is: A Transformational Journey	Suzanne Bryant	
Indelible	Pavitra Chalam	
Planes, Trains & Autorickshaws	Scott Sheppard	
A Gran Plan	Sangeeta Nambiar	
Jana Gana Mana	Vijay Das	
Shaya	Amir Noorani	
Larry Brought Lemon	Ujjwal Patel	
Ehsaas	Sunil Nair	
Daadi	David Stoler	
Sidekick (3D Animation)	Amrinder Jassar	
Gattu	Rajan Khosa	
Vishwaroopam	Kamal Haasan	
Leaving Home	Robert Richter	
Sambhavna	Joseph Malone	
Saari Raat	Parimal Aloke	
Party	Santosh Davakhar	
Do Pahar	Shazia Shrivastava & Sharifa Roy	
Un.Kahi	Samrat DasGupta	
Little Terrors	Maninder Chana	
Highway	Deepak Rauniyar	
Paanch Adhyay	Pratim DasGupta	
Valley of Saints	Musa Syeed	

== 2012 Film Screenings ==
Title	Director	Cast
Love, Wrinkle - Free	Sandeep Mohan	Ash Chandler, Shernaz Patel, Seema Rahmani, Sohrab Ardeshir, Ashwin Mushran, Arika Silaichia, Tensin Dasang
Adwait Sangeet	Makarand Brahme	
Aadukalam (The Arena)	Vetrimaaran	Dhanush, Velraj Rajamani, Tapsee Pannu
The Great Indian Marriage Bazaar	Ruchika Muchhala	
Shuttlecock Boys	Hemant Gaba	Aakar Kaushik, Manish Nawani, Alok Kumar, Vijay Prateek
Do Paise Ki Dhoop, Chaar Aane Ki Baarish	Deepti Naval	Manisha Koirala, Rajit Kapur, Sanaj Naval
Love You to Death	Rafeeq Ellias	Yuki Ellias, Carl Sequeria, Leonid Kudryavtsev, Sheeba Chaddha, Suhasini Mulay, Sohrab Ardeshir
Porn Masala	Ken Kwek	Vadi PVSS, Adrian Pang
The Myth of Buddha's Birthplace	James Freeman	
Paulwaat (The Pathway)	Aditya Ingale	Subodh Bhave, Jyoti Bhandekar
Patang (The Kite)	Prashant Bhargava	Seema Biswas, Nawazuddin Siddiqui, Sugandha Garg
Love, Lies and Seeta	Chandra Pemmaraju	Melanie Kannokada, Arjun Gupta, Michael Derek, Lavrenti Lopes
A Little Revolution - A Story of Suicide & Dreams	Harpreet Kaur	
Your Own is Your Own	Anjay Nagpal	
Fire in Our Hearts	Jayshree Janu Kharpade	
Letters Home	Neilesh Verma	
Have I Shared Too Much?	Sameer Acharya	
The 5	Ravi Kapoor	
According to Plan A	Anuj Nijhawan	
Set in Stone	Divij Roopchand	
Bureaucracy Sonata	Vinay Shukla	
Maaya Getting Born	Anand Raghavan	
Anoochcharito (Unuttered)	Sourav Sarkar	
Sati Shaves Her Head	Tejal Shah	
Wind	Manik Andan	
Always There	Jayesh Pillai	
The Ballad of Sandeep	Derek Frey	Deep Roy
Another Day Another Life	Rohit Gupta	Benjamin Jacobs, Amneek Sandhu
Nu Me (New Me)	Anjani K Pandey	John Von Trapp, Anjani K Pandey, Barbara Wilcox, Jay Cannon, Tamara Austin, Rebecca Ladd
Uncoupled	Monica Bassi	
The Coffee	Hemant Dinkar	

== 2011 Film Screenings ==
Title	Director	Cast
Ashes	Ajay Naidu	Heather Burns, Ajay Naidu, Piper Perabo, Faran Tahir, Samrat Chakrabarti, Reena Shah
Huppa Huiyya	Anil Surve	Mohan Joshi, Ushna Nadkarni, Ganesh Yadav, Mangesh Desai, Maansi Mangikar, Vaibhav Mangale, Kushai Badrike, Nilesh Divekar, Poonam Jadhav
Prasthanam (The Rise and Fall of a Person)	Deva Katta	Sharwanand, Ruby Parihar, Sai Kumar, Vennela Kishore, Sundeep Kishan
I am...	Ramesh Devu	Scott Mccabe, Wendy Nguyen, Bert Van Aalsburg
Topi	Arjun Rihan	Sarah Zerina Usmen, Ludwig Goransson, Sunil Rihan, Mala Rihan, Gurushish Dhupar, Naila Azad, Subash Kundanmal
Fresh Arrangement	Monica Bassi	Monica Bassi, Amit Lamba, Jeremiah Jett, Sujatha Chetty
The Eclipse of Taregna	Rakesh Chaudhary	Surendra Rajan, Purav Bhandare, Geetika Tyagi, Saagar Kale, Ashutosh Warang, Jimmy Peters, Sachin Tawde
Fatakra	Soham Mehta	Samrat Chakrabarti, Meena Serendib, Ritik Goyal, Raj Vats
Shakti Pirakkudhu (Shakti Rising)	Usha Rajeswari	Devadarshini, Sashi, Sampatth, Vishalini, Soori, Manaswini, T.K. Kala, Malar, Satyasree, Dr. S. Raghuraman, Madurai Annakamatchi
I Met with an Accident	Trevord Ward	Benedict Das
Life! Camera Action...	Rohit Gupta	Dipti Mehta, Shaheed K. Woods, Noor Naghmi, John Crann, Subodh Batra, Swati Kapila, Jyothi Singh, Nina Mehta, Chelsi Stahr
Udaan	Vikramaditya Motwane	Anurag Kashyap, Ronnie Screwvala, Sanjay Singh
I am Kalam	Nila Madhab Panda	Harsh Mayar, Hussan Saad, Gulshan Grover, Beatrice Ordeix
Visible Bra Straps	Ajitesh Sharma	Petra Khruz, Reeth Mazumder
Dhobi Ghat	Kiran Rao	Aamir Khan, Prateik Babbar, Monica Dogra
A Journey in My Mother's Footsteps	Dina Rosenmeier	Dina Rosenmeier, Jessie Rosenmeier, Joern Rosenmeier, Mohinder Singh, Nergis Udwadia, Shaila Samuel, Viji Iyengar
Cocktail	Arun Kumar	Jayasurya, Anoop Menon, Samvrutha Sunil, Fahad Fazil, Innocent Mamukkoya
Dams: The Lethal Water Bombs	Sohan Roy	Vijo Alex, Tony Kurian, Vipin Viswan, Saj Matthews, Rajesh Nair
Still Voices	Tamal Sen	Gaurav Dwivedi, Paru Gambhir, Kaushik Ghosh, Shahidur Rahaman, Prasenjit Ghosh, Sudipto Shankar Roy
You Can't Curry Love	Reid Waterer	Ashwin Gore, Russell Reynolds, Rajan Velu, Rakshak Sahni, Upasana Beharee, William Vega, Frederic Chaignat
Nerd of the Ring	Gowtham Bachina	Charles Marina, Michael Kuya, Zuri Bella, John Phillips, Saladin Florence, Corey Richards, Madaline Berube, Tilly, Trevor Teichmann, Aaron Phillips, Kole
Soy Milk	Veeran Naran	Djon Alexander, Mark Silveira, Lisa Emmanuel, Stefan Duscio, Nathalie Resciniti, Michael Latham, Juliet Hill, David Balaban
Esha	Reza Dahya	Albina Nahar, Adam Sidawi, Ashton Bishop, Chantal Hazineh, Christopher Lee Grant, Adam Crosby
A Girl Like You with a Boy Like Me	Ruben Amar	James Rana, Frank X, Allison Carter Thomas, Joan Chemia, Rick Adamson, Ryan Samuel, Jennifer Lilly
Shukno Lanka (Dry Red Chillies)	Gaurav Pandey	Mithun Chakraborty, Debashree Roy, Sabyasachi Chakraborty Sabyasachi Chakrabarty, Emma Brown Garett, Angana Bose, Saheb Chatterjee, Nandinil Chaterjee, Arindam Sil, Chattrapati Dutta, Suman De, Late Kunal Mitra
Blood & Curry	Atul Sharma	Atul Sharma, Angie Light, Raghu Bhagat, Dhara Mehta, Sathya Jesudason, Abhi Trivedi, Fagun Thakrar, Ilona Maitra, Nicole Layson, Parminder Sidhu, Robbie Rosario, Robert P. Campbell
Life Goes On	Sangeeta Datta	Sharmila Tagore, Girish Karnad, Om Puri, Soha Ali Khan, Rez Kempton, Neerja Naik, Christopher Hatherall, Mukulika Banerjee, Misha Crosby, Tom Reed

== 2010 Film Screenings ==
Title	Director	Cast
7 Days in Slow Motion	Umakanth Thumrugotl	Teja, Kunai Sharma, Shiva Varma, Rajeshwari Sachdev, Ayesha Jaleel
Amal	Richie Mehta	Rupinder Nagra, Naseeruddin Shah, Seema Biswas, Koel Purie, Roshan Seth, Vik Sahay
Bombay Summer	Joseph Matthew Varghese	Tannishtha Chatterjee, Jatin Goswami, Samrat Chakrabarti, Gaurav Dwivedi
Little Zizou	Sooni Taraporevala	Boman Irani, Sohrab Ardeshir, Zenobia Shroff, Shernaz Patel, Imaad Shah, John Abraham
Tahaan	Santosh Sivan	Purav Bhandare, Anupam Kher, Sarika, Rahul Bose, Victor Banerjee, Rahul Kanna Rahul Khanna
Gulabi Talkies	Girish Kasaravalli	Umashree, K.G. Krishna Murthy, M.D. Pallavi, Poornima Mohan a/k/a Poornima Indrajith, Ashok Sandip
Gabhricha Paus (The Damned Rain)	Satish Manwar	Girish Kulkarni, Sonali Kulkarni, Jyoti Subhash, Veena Jamkar, Ammanul Attar
Kanchivaram	Priyadarshan	Prakash Raj, Shriya Reddy Sriya Reddy, Shammu, Geetha Vijayan
Pazhassi Raja	Hariharan	Mammootty, Sarath Kumar R. Sarathkumar, Thilakan, Suresh Krishna, Manoj K. Jayan, Kaniha a/k/a Kanika, Padmapriya a/k/a Padmapriya Janakiraman
The Salt Stories	Lalit Vachani	Mrinal Desal, Anita Kushwaha, Lalit Vachani, Menno Boerema
Anything for You	Anand Alagappan	Sam Ghosh, Julie Fine, Pooja Kumar, Aaron Mathias
Chath: A Roof Without Walls	Hyder Bilgrami & Tirthankar Das	Sanjay Malhotra, Llyakat Khan, Charu Gupta, Sarah Tyler, Shayna Glassman
Wake Up Sid	Ayan Mukerji	Ranbir Kapoor, Konkona Sen Sharma, Namit Das, Rahul Khanna, Anupam Kher, Kainaz Motivala, Supriya Pathak, Kashmera Shah
Kissing Miss Jones	Chandra Pemmaraju	Lavrenti Lopes, Khushboo Shah, Christopher Peuler, Meredith Dillard, Julie Donahue, Kyle Donahue, Collin James, Aaron Katter, Nadia Rahman, Aditi P. Solanki
Sukrit's Sundays	Vasant Nath	
Ismael	Ambarish Manepalli	
Kavi	Gregg Helvey	Sagar Salunke, Ulhas Tayade, Rajesh Kumar, Madhavi Juvekar, Debu Bhattacharya, Rishi Raj Singh, Mukesh Barahti

== Film School ==
IIFF was the first South Asian Film Festival in the United States to hold an independent film school for aspiring filmmakers. It was started in 2012.
