= Pemmaraju =

Pemmaraju is a Telugu surname. Notable people with the surname include

- Chandra Pemmaraju, Indian-American film writer and director
- Pemmaraju Sreenivasa Rao (1942–2025), Indian lawyer
- Uma Pemmaraju (1958–2022), Indian-American journalist and television anchor
