= Cheekatilo =

2026 Indian Telugu film by Sharan Koppisetty

- Promotional release poster
- Directed by: Sharan Koppisetty
- Written by: Chandra Pemmaraju
- Produced by: D. Suresh Babu
- Starring: Sobhita Dhulipala; Vishwadev Rachakonda
- Cinematography: Mallikarjun
- Edited by: KSN
- Music by: Sricharan Pakala
- Production company: Suresh Productions
- Distributed by: Amazon MGM Studios (via Prime Video)
- Release date: 23 January 2026
- Running time: 126 minutes
- Country: India
- Language: Telugu

Cheekatilo (transl. In the darkness) is a 2026 Indian Telugu-language crime thriller film directed by Sharan Koppisetty and written by Chandra Pemmaraju. Produced by D. Suresh Babu for Suresh Productions, it stars Sobhita Dhulipala and Vishwadev Rachakonda.

The film was released on 23 January 2026 on Amazon Prime Video.

== Plot ==
The film starts with the rape and attempted murder of Rani, a dancer, twenty years ago in a peculiar way with jasmine flowers in her hair. Her friend went to the police station to report this. But the police refused to take the case, as it was election time and they considered Rani to be collateral damage.

Currently, Sandhya works as a journalist on a TV channel. She is in love with Amar, who is two years younger than her and is from a different caste.

One day she learns that her report about a case to the TV channel was changed for the TRP. This upsets her. Her friend Bobby gave her the idea to start a podcast to give them freedom to investigate and expose true crime. So she quits her job to pursue her passion of exposing true crime with sensationalism.

One day Sandhya's family went to Amar's home for their engagement. When they returned from his home, she found that her friend had been brutally murdered in her flat with her boyfriend. After Sandhya's best friend dies, she investigates the case using her true crime podcast to expose the killer. She and the CI, Rajeev, collaborate on the investigation and bond. At first, she accuses the watchman, as his shoeprint was left behind and because he stole Bobby's necklace. But the real killer called her to confirm that the watchman is indeed not the killer and that he is going to kill another innocent woman.

She investigates similar murders from over twenty years earlier in the Godavari and Trichy districts after obtaining the case files via Rajeev's help.

When the surviving victims of the serial rapist and murderer do not show at a press conference, Sandhya's reputation suffers. Then two women enter the studio, and one of them reveals herself to be Rani.

However, the serial killer has already delivered on his promise, killing a girl named Asmi and her boyfriend. Sandhya, in the meantime, is taken as an unofficial consultant by the police investigation team led by a high-ranking officer named Ananditha with Rajeev in the team. Sandhya is convinced that Chinna Babu (a prominent politician who was from the same area as Rani) is the culprit, but his DNA does not match.

A victim's son tells her that because of her, his mother was reminded of her trauma. This destroys Sandhya's confidence, so she withdraws from the case, instead focusing on her engagement and marrying her partner, Amar. Later on, while hanging out with their friends at a bar, Amar's father calls to say that Amar's mother has died from a fatal fall.

Both Amar and Amar's father refuse an autopsy, raising Sandhya's suspicion. She is convinced that this is the work of the same killer, infuriating Amar, who tells her to leave the funeral. Sandhya discovers that her father-in-law is the serial murderer and rapist after her mother-in-law's murder. He killed her because she learnt of his crimes from a jewellery box filled with jewellery he collected from the bodies of his victims. She realised this because Amar's mother's Matryoshka doll contained two jewellery items that she took from her husband's box of jewellery. Sandhya's father-in-law unsuccessfully tries to kill her when she comes to his house in the guise of giving her mother's stew but is actually there to collect his DNA. In police custody, he reveals that his aunt raped him as a teen, and this aunt, when caught by her husband, accused the teen of assaulting her, which angered him, and he killed her and her husband. But the vengeance in him hadn't died, and so he became a rapist and murderer for vengeance and to quell his anger by hurting women who resembled his aunt.

== Cast ==
- Sobhita Dhulipala as Sandhya Nelluri
- Vishwadev Rachakonda as Amar Ojeti
- Chaitanya Krishna as CI Rajeev
- Vadlamani Srinivas as Ramu Anand Ojeti, Amar's father
- Ravindra Vijay as Chinna Babu
- Isha Chawla as Ananditha
- Aamani as Padma Ojeti, Amar's mother
- Jhansi as Sandhya's mother
- Suresh as DIG Rajamani
- Posani Krishna Murali as Nallama Reddy
- Aziz Naser as Irfan
- Pradeep Kondiparthi as Sandhya's father
- Sri Lakshmi as Sandhya's grandmother
- Ravi Varma as Ravikanth
- Harsha Chemudu as Murali
- Aditi Myakal as Bobby
- Kranthi Balivada as Vani
- Ramya Ponduri
- Sonakshi Verma
- Harshini
- Swara

== Music ==
The background score and songs were composed by Sricharan Pakala.

All lyrics are written by Chetan Prasad.

Track listing
No.	Title	Singer(s)	Length
1.	"Theme Song"	Sahithi Chaganti, Sricharan Pakala
2.	"Aigini"	Sindhu Budhavarapu

== Release and reception ==
Cheekatilo was released on 23 January 2026 on Amazon Prime Video.

Sanjana Pulugurtha of The Times of India rated it 3 out of 5 and cited it as a "well-staged thriller despite flaws", referring to the writing. Echoing the same, Sangeetha Devi Dundoo of The Hindu wrote that "Cheekatilo is an engaging, thoughtful drama that finds its strength in empathy rather than spectacle, but it could have benefited from sharper writing". Neeshita Nyayapati of Hindustan Times rated it 2.5 out of 5 felt that a film like this needed more "sensitivity and nuance" citing its subject.
