= Jessika Van =

American actress

- Occupation: Actress
- Years active: 2006–present

Jessika Van (Chinese: 范立美, pinyin: Fàn Lìměi) is an American actress. Van is most known for playing "Becca," the ringleader of the Asians or the Asian mafia in Season 2 and Season 3 of MTV's Awkward. She also played Kim, a Hong Kong Police Officer and sister of Detective Lee in the Rush Hour television series. She has also starred as the antagonist "Li Xue" in the 2019 12-episode Chinese series Yolk Man (蛋黄人).

== Career ==
Van starred as Grace Park opposite Justin Chon (who plays love interest Sid Park) in Benson Lee's film Seoul Searching, which premiered as an official selection of the 2015 Sundance Film Festival. She also played the role of the Sports Bar Waitress in the film The Gambler (2014) in a scene opposite both John Goodman and Mark Wahlberg where she remarks to Wahlberg not to pin the choice of beer on her; the film was directed by Rupert Wyatt and written by Oscar-award-winning screenwriter William Monahan. Van also starred as Annie in Junya Sakino's Sake-Bomb (2013) (also written by Jeff Mizushima) which premiered at the 2013 SXSW Film Festival. She also starred in Byron Q's film Bang Bang (2011), which won a Special Jury Award for Best First Feature, Narrative, at the 2011 Los Angeles Asian Pacific Film Festival. She also starred as Mia Ho in Danny Roth's feature comedy Foreign Exchange (2008).

Van played the reoccurring character "Koa Lin" on CW's The Messengers. Van also played the reoccurring character "Becca", the ringleader of the Asians, and the primary antagonist to Ming Huang (Jessica Lu) on MTV's Awkward. Van has also appeared on other TV shows such as playing a Goth character named "Sunshine" on Disney's A.N.T. Farm, playing "Stacey Tan" in the 2009 Without A Trace episode "Devotion," opposite David Huynh, and playing the younger Nikki Sun (Nikki Sun '89) on an episode of Cold Case, "Triple Threat" (2008).

Van had also been cast as Kim, the Hong Kong Police Officer that is also the younger sister of Detective Lee (played by Jon Foo) in the Rush Hour television series based on the Rush Hour series of films.

She has also provided the voice of "Akira" on Uncle Grandpa on Cartoon Network. She was also a voice actor for multiple kickball characters in an episode of the animated television series The Boondocks.

Van also appeared as "The Star" in Megan Lee's Music Video for Destiny, directed by Timothy Tau, as "Babe" in a comedy sketch YouTube video by The Fung Brothers about Jeremy Lin entitled "The Jeremy Lin Effect 2 (Linsanity)" also directed by Timothy Tau. She also appears as Casey in the web series It! People, Yuri in The Real Housewives of Horror, and as Carly in the web series Faulty Premise Life. She has also appeared in various videos by The Fung Brothers.

Van also starred as the main character, Tess, in Kai-Ting Tiffany Wu's short film Paper Lotus, which has screened at the Newport Beach Film Festival, the Palm Springs International Festival of Short Films, as well as the Taipei Film Festival. Van also stars in Jason Z. Wong's film Reunion alongside Tadamori Yagi, which has screened at the Boston International Film Festival, the LA Shorts Fest, the Newport Beach Film Festival and the Los Angeles Asian Pacific Film Festival. For her role as Hannah in that film, she won a Best Actress award at the 2013 Asians on Film Festival. She also appeared as Victoria Horne/Nabura in Timothy Tau's short film bio-pic, Keye Luke. Other short films she has appeared in include Chen Huang's Tea (opposite Archie Kao and James Kyson Lee), Sue Palmer's Road to Nanking, Danny Huang's The Promise with Christopher Dinh and Leonard Wu, Lior Chefetz' The Godmother (alongside Ron Yuan), Rafael F. Garcia's The Moral Thief, Sebastian Stenhoj's To Live and Dine in L.A. (alongside David Hasselhoff), and as Marilyn Monroe impersonator "Marilyn" in Maura Milan's Koreatown.

She also co-stars as the antagonist "Li Xue" in the 2019 Chinese TV series 蛋黄人/Yolk Man in 2019.

Van also played the role of Anna in the Chris Blake quarantine comedy, Distancing Socially filmed remotely at the height of the pandemic using the iPhone 11. The film was acquired and released by Cinedigm in October 2021.

In 2022, Van starred as Harper in the crime-comedy film Rattled and as Jessica in the film Hollywood Christmas.

== Filmography ==
=== Film ===
| Year | Title | Role | Notes |
|---|---|---|---|
| 2008 | Foreign Exchange | Mia Ho | |
| 2011 | Bang Bang | Jenn | |
| 2011 | Reunion | Hannah | Short film |
| 2012 | Keye Luke | Nabura / Victoria Horne | Short film |
| 2013 | Sake-Bomb | Annie | |
| 2014 | The Gambler | Sports Bar Waitress | |
| 2015 | Seoul Searching | Grace Park | |
| 2016 | Mike and Dave Need Wedding Dates | Jessika the Girl in Street | |
| 2017 | Luna | Luna | Short film |
| 2021 | Distancing Socially | Anna | |
| 2022 | A Hollywood Christmas | Jessica | TV movie on HBO Max |
| 2026 | Grind | Sarah | |
| 2026 | Making Space: A Goodbye Love Story | Cece | Short film; screened at Beverly Hills Film Festival |
| 2026 | The Toast | | Feature film, world premiere October 30th, Austin Film Festival. |

=== Television ===
| Year | Title | Role | Notes |
|---|---|---|---|
| 2010 | The Boondocks | Wushung Player | Voice role; episode: "The Red Ball" |
| 2011 | Faulty Premise Life | Carly | 4 episodes |
| 2013 | It! People | Casey | 4 episodes |
| 2012–2013 | Awkward | Becca | Recurring role, 6 episodes |
| 2014 | Uncle Grandpa | Akira | Voice role; episode: "Big in Japan" |
| 2014 | The Real Housewives of Horror | Yuri | 3 episodes |
| 2015 | The Messengers | Koa Lin | Main role |
| 2016 | Rush Hour | MSS Agent Kim Lee | Recurring role, 5 episodes |
| 2019 | Yolk Man (蛋黄人) | Li Xue | 5 episodes |
| 2020 | Bulge Bracket | Cathy | 6 episodes |
| 2021 | iCarly | Julia | Episode: "iRobot Wedding" |
| 2022 | The Rookie | Monica Ditmar | Episode: "Mother's Day" |
| 2022 | Paper Girls | Adult Missy Tieng | Episodes: "It Was Never About the Corn", "Matinee" |
| 2022 | American Horror Stories | Poppy | Episode: "Necro" |
| 2023 | Grey's Anatomy | Marni Young | Episode: "Training Day" |
| 2023 | Justified: City Primeval | Hina | Episode: "Kokomo" |
| 2026 | FBI | Jennifer Kuo | Episode: "Reticence" |

=== Video game ===
| Year | Title | Role | Notes |
|---|---|---|---|
| 2013 | Battlefield 4 | Huang "Hannah" Shuyi | |
| 2025 | Call of Duty: Black Ops 7 | Wei Lin | |

== Awards and nominations ==
| Year | Award | Category | Work | Result | Refs |
|---|---|---|---|---|---|
| 2013 | Los Angeles Movie Awards | Best Actress | Paper Lotus | Won | |
| 2013 | Asians On Film Festival | Best Actress – Short | Reunion | Won | |
