= Sierra Katow =

American comedian

- Born: Sierra Lynn Katow; Pasadena, California, U.S.
- Education: Harvard University (A. B.), Computer science
- Notable work: Last Comic Standing; Last Call with Carson Daly; Close Enough

Comedy career
- Years active: 2015–present
- Medium: Stand-up comedian, writer, actress, podcaster

Sierra Lynn Katow is an American stand-up comedian, actress, writer and podcaster.

== Early life ==
Sierra Lynn Katow was born to Vincent and Corinne Katow at the Huntington Memorial Hospital in Pasadena, California and is a fourth-generation American of Chinese and Japanese heritage. She grew up in La Cañada in Los Angeles County. Katow attended La Cañada Elementary School, La Cañada High School, and Harvard University, where she was part of a number of comedy groups including the Harvard College Stand-Up Comic Society and vice-president of The Harvard Lampoon; and from 2013 to 2014 a cartoonist for The Harvard Crimson, and graduated with a degree in Computer Science in 2016. While attending college, Katow performed in and around Boston and around Hollywood when home on summer break, and participated in a Lampoon roast of and award ceremony for Jimmy Fallon in 2015.

== Career ==
Katow began performing at comedy clubs at the age of 16, and broke into the West Coast stand-up industry during high school. During college she often performed at open mics at comedy clubs in the Boston area, and through this organised further gigs with fellow comedians while backstage.

She was the youngest comedian to feature on Season 9 of Last Comic Standing (2015), which she auditioned for during her junior year, and has also performed stand-up on television in Last Call with Carson Daly, Just For Laughs Digital, Laughs (on Fox) and Acting Out (MTV).

In 2020, Variety announced Katow was joining the cast of the Chris Blake quarantine comedy, Distancing Socially. The film was shot in 2020, using remote technologies and the iPhone 11. The film was acquired and released by Cinedigm in October 2021.

In 2021, Katow voiced two characters in Disney's Raya and the Last Dragon and appeared as recurring character Evangeline in Mindy Kaling's The Sex Lives of College Girls on HBO Max. Katow will create a short adult animated series to feature on Cake on FXX in 2022.

Katow has written for Take My Wife; Drop the Mic; Earth to Ned and Close Enough on HBO Max; The Wedding Coach on Netflix; and Eureka! on Disney Junior. She has also been involved in several projects with Wong Fu Productions, including appearing in and writing for the series Dating After College. She also appeared as Mulan in the Screen Junkies web production The Roast of Beauty and the Beast in 2017.

She co-hosted the comedy podcast SCUSSION with SCLARQ + SKATOW with fellow comedian and Harvard alumnus Sam Clark in 2016. Katow is the host of the podcast Stay Podsitive with Sierra Katow, which she started in 2019. As of January 2026, no new podcast episodes have been uploaded since April 2022.

Outside of comedy, Katow does freelance work as a full-stack web developer.

== Filmography ==
=== Film ===
| Year | Title | Role | Notes |
|---|---|---|---|
| 2021 | Raya and the Last Dragon | Merchant, Fang Officer (voice) | |
| 2021 | Distancing Socially | Mi Cha | |
| 2023 | Ant-Man and the Wasp: Quantumania | Waiter | |

=== Television ===
| Year | Title | Role | Notes |
|---|---|---|---|
| 2015 | Last Call with Carson Daly | Herself | Guest; Series 14, Episode 55: "Evan Peters/Sierra Katow/The Re-Licked Project" |
| 2015 | Last Comic Standing | Herself | Series 9, Episode 4: "The Invitationals: Last Chance to Advance" |
| 2015 | Laughs | Herself | Series 2, Episode 2: "Funny Boys and Girls" |
| 2016 | Acting Out | Herself - Comedian | Series 1, Episode 5 |
| 2016 | Girls Dorm | Sketchy | |
| 2018 | Straight Up, Stand Up | Herself | Series 1, Episode 4: "Bar Lubitsch" |
| 2018 | Take My Wife | PA | Series 2, Episode 7; writers' assistant, 8 episodes |
| 2018 | Drop the Mic | | Writers' assistant, 10 episodes |
| 2019 | Epic Night | | Writer |
| 2020 | Earth to Ned | Comedian | Series 1, Episode 2: "Laugh Your Ned Off"; also writer for Season 1 |
| 2021–2022 | The Sex Lives of College Girls | Evangeline | Recurring; 12 episodes |
| 2022–2023 | Eureka! | | Writer (8 segments), staff writer |
| 2024 | Exploding Kittens | | Writer (episode 5 "No Regrets"), executive story edtor |
| 2026 | Golden Axe | | Writer (episode 6 "Return to Wenisburg") |
| 2026– | Eternally Yours | | Executive story edtor |
| 2026 | Beavis and Butt-Head | | Writer (season 12, segment 11 "Double Vision") |

=== Web ===
| Year | Title | Role | Notes |
|---|---|---|---|
| 2016 | Kill Tony | Herself | Episode 140 (Joey Diaz and Jeff Garlin) |
| 2017 | How to Define the Relationship | Vicky | Wong Fu Productions short |
| 2017 | Screen Junkies Roasts | Mulan | Series 1, Episode 6: "The Roast of Beauty and the Beast" |
| 2018 | How Asians Celebrate Halloween | Ocean's 8 Awkwafina | Wong Fu Productions short |
| 2019 | Dating After College | Woman #1; writer | Wong Fu Productions short |
