= Lavrenti Lopes =

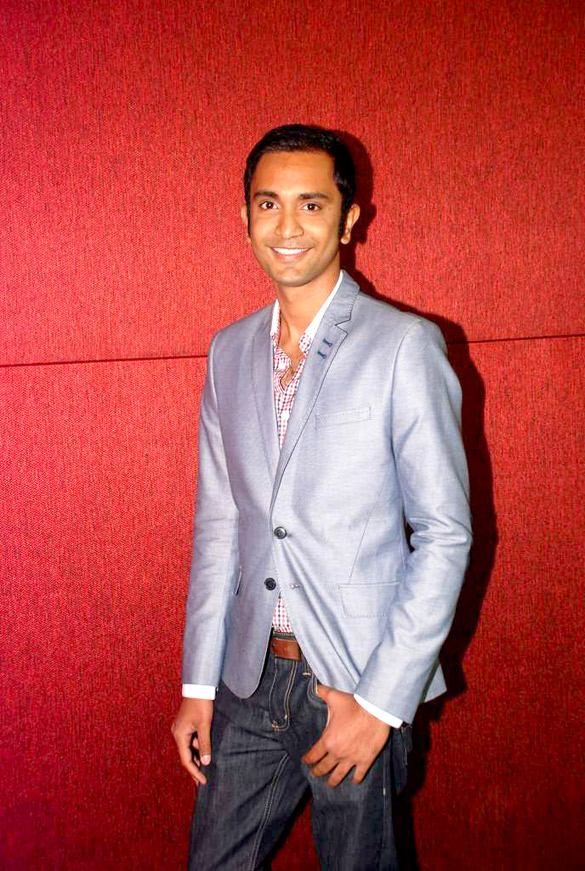
- Lavrenti Lopes at the Press conference of 'Love Lies & Seeta'
- Born: Mumbai, Maharashtra, India
- Occupation: Actor

Lavrenti Lopes is an Indian actor and model.

== Filmography ==
Movies
Year	Film	Role	Notes and Awards
2011	subHysteria	Faisal	
2012	Afghan Hound	Zemar	
2012	Desperate Endeavors	Dilip	
2012	Love, Lies and Seeta	Bhavuk	
2016	The Mad Ones	Nitin	Bentonville Film Festival
2017	Namour	Tomas	LA Film Festival winner

Television
Year	Show	Role	Notes and Awards
2012	The Wedding Band(TBS)	Jagdish	
2012	Review with Forest Macneil (Comedy Central)	Victor	
2012	Don't Trust the B— in Apartment 23	Clerk	
2013	New Girl	Gopi	
