= Earth to Ned =

American television series

- Genre: Puppetry; Improvisational comedy; Talk show
- Starring: Paul Rugg; Michael Oosterom; Colleen Smith
- Theme music composer: Gimme Moonz
- Country of origin: United States
- Original language: English
- No. of seasons: 1 (2 parts)
- No. of episodes: 20

Production
- Executive producers: Brian Henson; Vince Raisa; Joseph Freed; Allison Berkeley
- Running time: 23–25 minutes
- Production companies: The Jim Henson Company; Marwar Junction Productions

Original release
- Network: Disney+
- Release: September 4, 2020 – January 1, 2021

Earth to Ned is an American television show on Disney+. It stars Ned, an alien from outer space who comes to Earth on a mission to invade it. Upon arriving, he fell in love with its pop culture, and instead hosts a late night talk show to meet and be entertained by Earth's celebrities. Earth to Ned premiered on September 4, 2020, on Disney+ and consisted of ten episodes. Ten more episodes were released on January 1, 2021. The series was removed from Disney+ on May 26, 2023.

== Premise ==
Sent by his father, the Admiral of the Galactic Fleet, to conquer the planet, Ned arrives on Earth (classified as Planet 2187) only to become enchanted with Earth's celebrities. Instead of invading the planet, Ned buries the Battlecruiser Nova deep below Earth's crust and abducts celebrities by beaming them to his ship for interviews in the style of a late night talk show. Ned serves as the host and the show features Cornelius as an alien sidekick from a race of aliens called Cornisians that Ned's species had previously conquered, his ship's A.I. B.E.T.I., and an unspecified number of much smaller alien beings called CLODs (short for Cloned Living Organism of Destruction) who speak in gibberish and scare the guests. Ned and Cornelius broadcast their show from their spaceship-turned-television studio.

=== Format ===
Every episode typically begins with Ned facing some sort of issue or becoming intrigued by an average, every day cultural phenomenon such as sports, pets, or dreams. He will banter with Cornelius and B.E.T.I. before starting up the show. Cornelius will introduce the first guest, who is usually seen getting beamed into a waiting room (apparently while they were in the middle of some other activity) and will converse with B.E.T.I. before arriving on set. Sometimes depending on what Ned is up against, the guest will come straight to the set. Ned will go into the guest's background before segueing into the subject at hand. Sometimes Ned will have them play a game, or have the guest do something relating to their craft, though this is not always the case.

After the first guest is sent home, Ned will send Cornelius to the surface to learn more about the episode's subject. Cornelius will usually interact with a professional of some kind and occasionally will interact with another well known celebrity. Sometimes, Ned will instead play a video or Cornelius will be sent to fulfill a task of some kind instead. Afterwards, he is brought back where Ned brings on the second guest, who is immediately brought to the set. Once again, Ned goes through a similar interviewing set up and will sometimes have them play a game or not.

After the second guest is sent home, Ned will close the show out. A coda usually appears at the end of most episodes with Ned recording a status report of his supposed conquering of Earth which consists of him claiming that something went wrong and that he has to delay the attack. He instead talks about what he has learned about Earth's culture as part of his personal observation. It is implied that he is trying to subconsciously convince his father that Earth is not bad and should be spared.

== Characters ==
- Ned (performed by Paul Rugg) -- The 437-year-old spaceship captain and talk show host from an as-yet-unidentified alien race with four arms. He was tasked with leading an assault on Earth, but fell in love with the culture and decided to start a talk show instead. His father is the Admiral of the Galactic Fleet who is charged with conquering of the galaxy and it is heavily implied throughout the first season that he has a troubled relationship with him. Ned is egotistical and brash, but very curious nonetheless and wants to be informed of all things earth-related. He considers Ben Schwartz to be his arch-nemesis because in the future, he hosts the reboot version of this show. His favorite earth "cuisine" is mayonnaise and his real name is a high pitch scream. While providing the face performance and voice of Ned, Paul Rugg is assisted in performing Ned by Morgana Ignis, Donna Kimball, Allan Trautman (who leads the animatronic performance), and Jack Venturo.
- Cornelius (performed by Michael Oosterom) - The lieutenant and talk show co-host. He comes from a race of aliens called Cornisians who have always served Ned's species ever since Ned's kind conquered the Cornisians' homeworld of Cornassus and Cornelius lost his family when his planet was destroyed by Ned's species. Cornelius takes to the idea of being a co-host for Ned's show and will introduce the guests. Cornelius often gets sent to the surface to perform field reporting, which usually results in him getting absorbed into the complexities of the subject at hand. He is slightly inept, but witty and makes humorous comebacks when Ned insults him. Michael Oosterom is assisted in performing Cornelius by Nicolette Santino (who operates the left-hand) and Drew Massey while Kyle Pacek is the in-suit performer for Cornelius in full body shots.
- B.E.T.I. (voiced by Colleen Smith) - The spaceship's artificial intelligence. She is a charge of energy that powers the ship and doubles as a computer that can glean information. B.E.T.I. is sarcastic and cynical and is not above belittling Ned and Cornelius's intelligence. At one point, she felt insulted when guest Thomas Lennon corrected her about American Gothic. B.E.T.I. typically appears on a giant screen behind the set. B.E.T.I.'s digital build was done by Eri Hawkins, John Hold, Dan Ortega, and Patrick Palmer.
- CLODs (various puppeteers) - Short for Cloned Living Organism of Destruction, they are a group of small monster-like creatures implied to be created by B.E.T.I. from clone tissue that can eat mostly any material and speak in unintelligible grunts and growls. Most of them make up the house band in the first episode until Cornelius fired them for destroying their instruments.

Additional characters performed by Grant Baciocco, Greg Ballora, Kevin Carlson, Raymond Carr, Kevin Clash, Dorien Davies, Alice Dinnean, Artie Esposito, Peggy Etra, Genevieve Flati, Dan Garza, Brian Henson, Tim Lagasse, Bruce Lanoil, Amanda Maddock, Paul McGinnis, Ted Michaels, Alison Mork, Sarah Sarang Oh, Michelan Sisti, Eliza Skinner, John Tartaglia, Jack Venturo, Russ Walko, and Victor Yerrid.

== Production ==
Executive produced by Brian Henson (son of Jim Henson) and Vince Raisa (a Jim Henson Company veteran), Earth to Ned combines expert puppeteering with witty banter and carefully selected guest appearances. Henson remarked that the show had been something he had been working on for years and was based on the interesting concept of someone or something wholly unfamiliar with humans trying to figure them out. Because the episodes are available at any time of day and therefore accessible to viewers of all ages, Henson focused on making the content family friendly.

The character of Ned requires four puppeteers and two other operators, while Cornelius requires three puppeteers. All of the puppets are fully animatronic with no CGI involved.

Henson revealed that almost none of the interview segments are scripted, with Ned, Cornelius and the guests for each episode improvising the conversation for the various talk show segments.

== Episodes ==
No.	Title	Directed by	Written by	Guests	Original release date
Part 1
1	"Late Night Ned"	Tom Stern	Sierra Katow, Yassir Lester, Maggie Monahan, Eliza Skinner, Adam Stein, Nick Wiger	Andy Richter, Vanessa Hudgens Gillian Jacobs	September 4, 2020
Ned gives up on wanting to take over Earth and instead starts a talk show. Ned dispatches Cornelius to Earth to find some late night TV insiders to steal some secrets from as he meets some late night writers like Bryan and Louis from Jimmy Kimmel Live!, Candice from Lights Out with David Spade, and Aparna from Late Night with Seth Meyers as they tell him everything they know. Gillian Jacobs tells Cornelius about what celebrities do on late night talk show and about continuity. Then they do a game called "Mimic to Win It" with Cornelius doing an impression of a Blood Bat from the Dark Abyss and the Baron of the Citadel while Gillian tries her impression of Krong: Great Warlord of Praxis and succeeds in her impression of Anguish the Water Beast. In his report to his father the Admiral, Ned claims that a really important part of his ship fell off before he can invade and gives his personal observation about entertainment.
2	"Laugh Your Ned Off"	Bruce Leddy	Sierra Katow, Yassir Lester, Maggie Monahan, Eliza Skinner, Adam Stein, Nick Wiger	Kristen Schaal, Paul Scheer (co-starring Maria Bamford)	September 4, 2020
Ned tries to get to the bottom of understanding human comedy after Cornelius laughs at the comedic actions of the CLODs. Kristen Schaal talks about her early life, teaches Ned how to do different types of laughter, how to get a comedic start, and wants her to call Rula Lenska. Then they do a game of "Clash of the Jokes". Following B.E.T.I.'s "CLOD-Cast", Cornelius shows footage of his visit to an open mic night and learning about it from comedian Sierra Katow, trying his hand at it, meeting Maria Bamford who claims that he reminds him of Dave Chappelle, and a fall-out of his stand-up comedy. Paul Scheer talks about comedy and mentions how the CLODs are roasting Ned and learning about his relationship with his father which ends with Cornelius' Roaster Toaster getting beamed into outer space. In his report to the Admiral, Ned jokes that Earth is 100% invaded and gives his personal observation about human comedy. During the credits, the Roaster Toaster roasts the Moon, Venus, and the Andromeda Galaxy.
3	"I've Got a Ned Feeling About This"	Bruce Leddy	Sierra Katow, Jordan Morris, Maggie Monahan, Eliza Skinner, Adam Stein, Nick Wiger	Reggie Watts, Billy Dee Williams, BB-8	September 4, 2020
Instead of a talk show about slugs, Ned hosts a Star Wars-themed show after brushing up on the films, TV shows, and books. Reggie Watts names a CLOD Jean, talks about his first Star Wars experience, meeting Star Wars actors like John Boyega on The Late Late Show with James Corden, asking what color lightsaber he would have, and making up songs about outer space. The Roaster Toaster returns from the Moon in droid form as she malfunctions roasting Cornelius as B.E.T.I. summons BB-8 to examine the Roaster Toaster and fix it. Two CLODs dressed as Darth Vader and Obi-Wan Kenobi engage in a lightsaber fight. Ned has B.E.T.I. hail the Admiral only for the Admiral's second-in-command Vincent to answer. Vincent states that the Admiral is currently unavailable as he is currently bombarding Planet 89170 where he will see Ned when he sees him. Billy Dee Williams talks about he got the role of Lando Calrissian and engage in a game of "Vaporizer to the Head" where he must give truthful answers. In his report to the Admiral, Ned claims that a malfunction to the ship's nav computer prevented him from pulverizing Earth where it sent a laser beam to the wrong planet as B.E.T.I. works to fix the problem and gives his personal observation about the Star Wars franchise.
4	"Night of the Living Ned"	Tom Stern	Sierra Katow, Yassir Lester, Maggie Monahan, Eliza Skinner, Adam Stein, Nick Wiger	Eli Roth, Lil Rel Howery	September 4, 2020
With the CLODs sleep-deprived and terrified after watching horror movies, Ned wants to understand why we love to be scared of things. Eli Roth talks about the horror movies that he directed, how he got into making them, and his top three horror movies being The Shining, The Evil Dead, and The Texas Chain Saw Massacre. B.E.T.I. tells a ghost story that the ship is haunted by the ghost of an old alien with a golden arm. Ned dispatches Cornelius to find him a ghost as Cornelius arrives at the Hollywood Forever Cemetery where he meets its owner Tyler and learns that Judy Garland, Rudolph Valentino, Johnny Ramone are buried in his cemetery as he finds out that Tyler actually died in 1999 meaning that he was just talking to a ghost. After one CLOD turns into a Were-CLOD, Lil Rel Howery talks about his comedic start, re-enacts lines from Get Out, and mentions about first seeing It. In his report to the Admiral, Ned claims that the crystals used to power the paralytic laser have broke where they have to be replaced and gives his personal observation about humans experiencing fear regularly.
5	"A Ned's Best Friend"	Bruce Leddy	Sierra Katow, Yassir Lester, Maggie Monahan, Eliza Skinner, Adam Stein, Nick Wiger	Jenny Slate, Bindi and Robert Irwin	September 4, 2020
Ned gets advice on how to raise a pet or in his case a lemon that he names Daniel Day Lemon after Ned had a sneezing reaction to Cornelius' pet tortoise (who Cornelius keeps mistaking for a turtle). Jenny Slate talks about her work in animated projects, lends her voice to some of the CLODs, talks about how she responds to an animal's sweetness like her pet dog Reggie, talks about how lemons can't give affection towards him, and helps Ned throw off a call from the police about prank calls being traced to the ship by impersonating Angela Lansbury. Ned dispatches Cornelius to take Daniel Day Lemon to a groomer as he meets an animal stylist named Jess who dresses Daniel Day Lemon while discussing how she handles dogs and grooming Cornelius. After Cornelius' tortoise had left to live with tortoises on a farm upstate, Bindi and Robert Irwin describes the word "Crikey", give advice on how to handle a pet, give advice on talking to animals, and an interaction with puppies that were beamed on to the ship. In his report to the Admiral, Ned claims that his satellites are still scanning for the right place to strike and gives his personal observation on pets. Cornelius gets a postcard from his tortoise stating that he is enjoying his life on the upstate farm as Ned squeezes Daniel Day Lemon enough for lemon juice to strike his left eye. During the credits, Ned and Cornelius get a call from Angela Lansbury as Ned figures out that Jenny was impersonating her again.
6	"@NedFromTV"	Tom Stern	Sierra Katow, Yassir Lester, Maggie Monahan, Eliza Skinner, Adam Stein, Nick Wiger	NeNe Leakes, Michael Ian Black	September 4, 2020
Ned and Cornelius become addicted to their phones and social media as they make plans to understand social media. NeNe Leakes talks about what she uses her different phones, the meaning of her "bloop", her work on The Real Housewives of Atlanta, does some role-playing with B.E.T.I., what entrepreneur means, and the use of emojis. Ned dispatches Cornelius to find some social media experts and learn all of their secrets where he meets three teenagers who tell him about how to use his app and how to do selfies. Michael Ian Black talks about how he became comedy royalty, what people can post about on social media, how to master the selfie, and tries out the Ned filter that B.E.T.I. put on his phone.
7	"The Ned-aissance"	Tom Stern	Sierra Katow, Yassir Lester, Maggie Monahan, Eliza Skinner, Adam Stein, Nick Wiger	Raven-Symoné, Thomas Lennon (co-starring Hebru Brantley and Betsy Sodaro)	September 4, 2020
Ned tries to understand the concept of art and why people like it when the CLODs take up painting. Raven-Symoné talks about her clothing styles, her role of Raven Baxter on That's So Raven and Raven's Home, what makes her a "renaissance woman", the definition of art, and plays a game of "Art or Naw". After receiving a scheduled delivery of a picture of Ned in the style of The Scream, Ned dispatches Cornelius to a place where human art is created where he meets street artist Hebru Brantley where Cornelius makes his own street art. Thomas Lennon talks about how he shares the last name with John Lennon, his work on Reno 911!, the movies he wrote like Herbie: Fully Loaded and Night at the Museum, referencing his father's work at the Art Institute of Chicago, his identification of the Ned versions of known paintings, his love of art, and identifying the CLODs different artwork of Thomas. In his report to the Admiral, Ned claims that the mission was stalled because one of Cornelius' stomachs was aching and that he didn't want to do a repeat of the incident during the Ikupazorlap re-invasion and gives his personal observation of art. During the credits, a "Who is Cornanksky" video is shown where Betsy Sodaro gives her theory on who he is, Hebru states that Cornansky is an alien from outer space, and a pixelated Cornelius states that people should ask "Why is Cornansky".
8	"Nothin' But Ned"	Tom Stern	Sierra Katow, Yassir Lester, Maggie Monahan, Eliza Skinner, Adam Stein, Nick Wiger	Joel McHale, Gina Carano (co-starring Joey Muñoz)	September 4, 2020
Ned takes a look at the concept of sports and how fun they are. Joel McHale talks about his work of the University of Washington's football team, the little nuggets of different sports, and adding sports commentary to nature documentary called "Natural Athletes". Ned dispatches Cornelius to a pro-wrestling school where pro-wrestler Joey Muñoz tells him about wrestling as he takes on a wrestling alias named Corndog Jackson. Gina Carano talks about her mixed martial artist career, why the world needs sports, how mixed martial artists are done, her work in The Mandalorian, and competing with Cornelius in Star Wars trivia. In his report to the Admiral, Ned claims that he had to call a time-out on the invasion in order to make some adjustments and gives his personal observation of sports.
9	"You Better Work, Ned!"	Tom Stern	Sierra Katow, Jordan Morris, Maggie Monahan, Eliza Skinner, Adam Stein, Nick Wiger	Rachel Bilson, RuPaul Charles	September 4, 2020
Ned and Cornelius learn about fashion with the CLODs getting in on the act. Rachel Bilson talks about her look, her clothing design, styles Ned, and styles a CLOD. Ned dispatches Cornelius to get more information on fashion where he learns about fashion from a fashion stylist named Melissa and partakes in a fashion photo shoot. After the CLOD shirts lose their interest, B.E.T.I. beams them to the Moon. RuPaul Charles talks about what fashion means to him, his start on becoming the world's most famous drag queen, gives fashion advice, and sees the CLOD fashion show inspired by Bob Mackie's outfit designs for Cher. During the credits, the out of style CLOD shirts are floating on the Moon.
10	"Ned: The Musical"	Bruce Leddy	Sierra Katow, Jordan Morris, Maggie Monahan, Eliza Skinner, Adam Stein, Nick Wiger	Taye Diggs, Rachel Bloom (co-starring Joshua Bassett and Olivia Rodrigo)	September 4, 2020
Ned tries to get Cornelius to understand musicals by singing about them while making a musical of his own. Taye Diggs talks about his start as a dancer, his work in Rent, the harmonies, and plays a game called "Which Thing is Which Thing"? Following B.E.T.I. singing the "Beam Bounce" with CLODs and dancers, Ned dispatches Cornelius to learn to love musical numbers as he meets Joshua Bassett and Olivia Rodrigo from High School Musical: The Musical: The Series. Rachel Bloom talks about the 12 tones, going to musical theater school, improvises a song with Ned, her work on Crazy Ex-Girlfriend, and singing about why nobody likes on-set pranks. Cornelius sings what he learns about musicals. In his report to the Admiral, Ned claims in the style of a musical that he will get to the invasion on next Tuesday.
Part 2
11	"Dream a Little Dream of Ned"	Bruce Leddy	Dan Gregor, Sierra Katow, Jordan Morris, Maggie Monahan, Eliza Skinner, Adam Stein, Nick Wiger	Ginnifer Goodwin, Alan Tudyk	January 1, 2021
Ned becomes unnerved at the concept of dreams and what they mean. Ginnifer Goodwin about studying at the Royal Academy of Dramatic Arts, her dream role, the meaning of dreams, and considering Judy Hopps from Zootopia as her favorite role. Following B.E.T.I.'s use of a brain scanner where Ned has good dreams and Cornelius had nightmares, Ned dispatches Cornelius to a therapist to take care of this where he meets psychotherapist Brooke Sprowl. B.E.T.I. then uses the brain scanner on a Clod to see what it dreams about and then uses the brain scanner on herself which played a simulation where Earth to Ned stops production due to an earthquake that destroys the spaceship where B.E.T.I. survived by transferring her conscious into a smart microwave. Alan Tudyk talks about the different voices he did, his work on Resident Alien, the different dreams he had, and experiencing different simulations. In his report to the Admiral, Ned claims that a meltdown in their Elusibium Refinement Chamber forced them to take the weapons offline where B.E.T.I. will resolve it soon and gives his personal observation on human dreams.
12	"The Neddies"	Bruce Leddy	Sierra Katow, Yassir Lester, Maggie Monahan, Jordan Morris, Eliza Skinner, Adam Stein, Nick Wiger	D'Arcy Carden, Oliver Hudson, and Lisa Loeb (co-starring Howard Fine)	January 1, 2021
Ned hosts his own awards show called the 230th Lunar Rotation Neddie Awards and becomes obsessed with winning an award as B.E.T.I. claims that human awards have no meaning. D'Arcy Carden wins the award for First Guest where she talks about her work in The Good Place, what to do on the red carpet, her memory of the first award she got, distributes the award for Most Valuable Crew Member to B.E.T.I., distributes the award for Most Lovable to Cornelius, and distributes the award for Best Host to herself. Cornelius distributes the award for Best CLOD Ensemble to "The Clod, the Clod, and the Cloddy". Ned dispatches Cornelius to take an acting class in order to teach the CLODs how to act better where he meets the acting class's teacher Howard Fine. Ned does a memorium to the lost CLODs who actually mattered with Lisa Loeb singing "Goodnight, Sweet CLOD". Oliver Hudson wins the award for Next Guest where he talks about his parents Goldie Hawn and Kurt Russell, corrects Ned by stating that his sister Kate Hudson was in Almost Famous, talks about the awards for the TV shows that he has done, and presents the award for Best Ned to Oliver Hudson because he portrayed Oliver "Bed Head" Redson in the 2001 sitcom Ned of the Class. Though Ned does get the award for Best Boss from Cornelius and the CLODs.
13	"Trancendental Neditation"	Tom Stern	Dan Gregor, Sierra Katow, Yassir Lester, Maggie Monahan, Eliza Skinner, Adam Stein, Nick Wiger	Yvette Nicole Brown, Jack McBrayer	January 1, 2021
Ned learns about how to manage stress. Yvette Nicole Brown talks about how she enjoyed portraying Aunt Sarah in Lady and the Tramp and adopted one of Lady's stand-in doubles, her hosting gigs, and how love is stressful in her personal life. An incoming message blast from the Galactic Fleet arrives which salutes the victories of its commanders. Commander Snargloz has destroyed 3 planets, Commander Kizcam has destroyed 1 planet, Commander Borf has destroyed 2 planets, Commander Tunarollzoid has destroyed 4 planets, Commander Zort has destroyed 2 planets, Commander Grifwad has destroyed 7 planets, Commander Durbellorb has destroyed 2 planets, Commander Steinadmaxplord has destroyed 5 planets, Commander Boyopiter has destroyed 2 planets, Commander Zarnar has destroyed 1 planet, Commander Katows has destroyed 6 planets, Commander Lakeroxium has destroyed 3 planets, and Commander Ned has destroyed 0 planets. In retaliation of his fellow commanders' victories, Ned dispatches Cornelius to deal with stress management and visits a rage room where he learns about it from its manager Kimber. Jack McBrayer teaches Ned how to smile, talks how he enjoyed working in 30 Rock, his first encounter with Tina Fey at Second City Theater, does improv with Ned, Cornelius, and B.E.T.I., mentions how improv can be stressful, and plays the game "Which Thing is Which Thing"? A "Ned Knows" public service announcements has Ned talking about the dangers of beaches and vacations as demonstrated by CLODs. In his report to the Admiral, Ned claims that he can't find the detonator key on his key chain of a giant panda and gives his personal observation on stress management like vacations.
14	"Party Like It's Nineteen Ninety Ned"	Bruce Leddy	Sierra Katow, Yassir Lester, Maggie Monahan, Eliza Skinner, Adam Stein, Nick Wiger	Kevin Smith, Aisha Tyler (co-starring Ben Schwartz)	January 1, 2021
After watching Clueless, Ned becomes obsessed with the 90's and its impact on culture. The CLODs form the Fly CLODs. Kevin Smith talks about his different careers, his work in Clerks, what he knows about the 90's, and plays "Vaporizer to Your Head" where he enjoys the movies based on Marvel Comics. Ned dispatches Cornelius to the future to see if their show will be rebooted where he finds himself on Ned 3.0 that contains an Announcer CLOD, B.E.T.I., an older Cornelius, and Ben Schwartz as Ned with the first CLOD President of the United States alongside guest appearances from Zendaya and Matt Damon's clone. This information did not go well with Ned. A "CLOD Fashion Show" 90's Edition is shown. Aisha Tyler talks about how she is fluent is different languages, her work in stand-up, her portrayal of Charlie Wheeler on Friends which she calls her big break, how she was into NSYNC, and her a cappella work in college. Ned vows to Ben Schwartz if he is watching that he will never get his chair as he will be keeping an eye on him. In his report to the Admiral, Ned claims that a CLOD got into the primary buffer panel again which short-circuited the entire ship and gives his personal observation of the 90's. During the credits taking place back in the possible future, Ben Schwartz interviews the CLOD President of the United States.
15	"Alien vs. Nedator"	Tom Stern	Dan Gregor, Sierra Katow, Jordan Morris, Maggie Monahan, Eliza Skinner, Adam Stein, Nick Wiger	Sherri Shepherd, Penn & Teller	January 1, 2021
Ned believes conspiracy theories and wants to explore their validity. Sherri Shepherd supports Ned's claim that aliens built the Egyptian pyramids, her opinion on why conspiracy theories are popular, sorts the things in Ned's intergalactic conspiracy theory book from the real ones and the fake ones like the reptilian conspiracy theory, Bigfoot, and the Illuminati, and helps Ned to start some new conspiracy theories. Cornelius shows some undercover footage that he did to see what people think of aliens at a hip Hollywood café. Penn and Teller show of a magic trick and then talk about their first interest in magic.
16	"Ned Over Heels"	Bruce Leddy	Sierra Katow, Yassir Lester, Maggie Monahan, Eliza Skinner, Adam Stein, Nick Wiger	Alyson Hannigan, Ben Feldman	January 1, 2021
Ned gains a crush on Alyson Hannigan and learns about the ups and downs of love during his interview with her as she also talks about her first role in a commercial, her work in Flora & Ulysses with Ben Schwartz, would craft if she wasn't acting, information on her husband Alexis Denisof, and her work in Buffy the Vampire Slayer when it was hit. After he and Alyson decide to remain friends, Ned is informed of a power drain from B.E.T.I. where the CLODs are creating a dating profile for a fictitious woman named Bramantha in attempts to win the affections of actual humans through catfishing. Ned dispatches Cornelius to find out about surviving love as he meets a speed dating host named Elizabeth. A "Ned Knows" public service announcement talks about what to do if they aren't in love. Ben Feldman talks about his work in Superstore, the clues to being in love, how to get over a crush that didn't work out like his experience with Alyson Hannigan, and picking out the right picture for an Internet dating profile. In his report to the Admiral, Ned claims that the cannons are charging up and gives his personal observation of love.
17	"Ned vs. Food"	Tom Stern	Dan Gregor, Sierra Katow, Jordan Morris, Maggie Monahan, Eliza Skinner, Adam Stein, Nick Wiger	Roy Choi, Brenda Song (co-starring Vanessa French)	January 1, 2021
Ned decides to become a foodie after seeing Cornelius snacking on Earth food upon being awoken from his sleep cycle. Chef Roy Choi talks about when he wanted to become a food mogul, his previous work at a hotel, his start with a taco food truck, how Emeril Lagasse's show Essence of Emeril changed his life without him meeting Emeril, receives help from Ned and Cornelius in coming up with a catchphrase, his reaction to something that is delicious, and makes mayonnaise for Ned which he puts in his cup. The CLODs prep for their restaurant Glark Trough as a commercial for it is shown that involves a slop that causes anyone who eats it to develop a hive mind. When Ned states that they should visit that restaurant, B.E.T.I. mentions that Glark Trough and everyone in it was condemned for health code violations. Brenda Song talks about her early work where she did the Running Man for Little Caesars, the best part of portraying London Tipton on The Suite Life of Zack & Cody and The Suite Life on Deck, the description of craft services, why she likes French fries and considers mayonnaise her least favorite food, the description of leftovers, and plays the game "Eat it or Secret" where Ned got disgusted by a birthday cake slice, a doughnut, and a bowl of fruit salad. In his report to the Admiral, Ned gives his personal observation of Earth food.
18	"CyberNedics"	Tom Stern	Dan Gregor, Sierra Katow, Jordan Morris, Maggie Monahan, Eliza Skinner, Adam Stein, Nick Wiger	Mayim Bialik, Margaret Cho (co-starring Adam Lustick)	January 1, 2021
After an argument with B.E.T.I. about the pronunciation of pizza which led to her crashing, Ned and Cornelius are forced to go low tech with an earlier version of B.E.T.I. while discussing science and waiting for the current version of B.E.T.I. is restored. The CLODs take up the cleaning. Mayim Bialik mentions how her first name is "water" in Hebrew, talks about the meaning of neuroscience and her 12-year break from acting to do neuroscience work, how only her children call her doctor which she was kidding about, what she was doing after The Big Bang Theory had ended, how the Jewish people power down from their technology every week for 25 hours, and is read some poetry from the Ooze-A-Tron E-22 due to the current B.E.T.I. not being on to feed it the directives. Ned dispatches Cornelius to the Intergalactic Whiz Desk to get some information on how to operate the ship where he doesn't know certain information about the Battlecruiser Nova to the customer service representative. Due to the wait time to speak to the manager, Cornelius comes back old. Margaret Cho talks about what separates her from other comedians, would like to see food in pill form (which reminds Ned of Risomulin Tip-Four) and jet packs (which reminded Cornelius on how a jet pack burned his butt off on Belt Number 52), and plays a game called "Two Truths and a Lie". The current B.E.T.I. is done rebooting as she commented that she had to lie down in some rice due to coming in contact with water. She proceeds to de-age Cornelius and mentions that the earlier B.E.T.I. passed away in her sleep. In his report to the Admiral, Ned is joined by B.E.T.I. who mentioned that she had undergo a reboot which stalled the plans to destroy Earth and how she missed working for Ned and Cornelius during this time.
19	"Growing Up Ned"	Bruce Leddy	Sierra Katow, Yassir Lester, Maggie Monahan, Eliza Skinner, Adam Stein, Nick Wiger	Molly Ringwald, Chris Colfer, and Grace VanderWaal (co-starring Cristela Alonzo)	January 1, 2021
When a CLOD named Zupinzalad chews a hole through the spaceship and runs away, Ned begins to think about the concept of growing up. Molly Ringwald talks about how she helps her kids grow up, a theory on why Zoopinzalad left him, and plays the game "Buildungs Quote 'Em". Cornelius shows a film called "Your Changing CLOD Bod" that Cornelius and B.E.T.I. made which Ned takes credit for and was narrated by Cristela Alonzo. Ned dispatches Cornelius goes to look for Zupinzalad where he finds him with Grace VanderWaal. Ned was not pleased that Cornelius had failed to coax Zupinzalad back to the spaceship as the CLODs start to undergo their teething process. Chris Colfer talks about the definition of being a triple-threat which he is, helps Ned with his singing, talks about his books called The Land of Stories, the time he left his home, and the definition of puberty.
20	"Like Father Like Ned?"	Bruce Leddy	Dan Gregor, Sierra Katow, Jordan Morris, Maggie Monahan, Eliza Skinner, Adam Stein, Nick Wiger	Jason Ritter, Tig Notaro (co-starring Baron Vaughn)	January 1, 2021
While Ned is trying a dish that Roy Choi previously made as part of his homemade alien movie, B.E.T.I. notifies Ned that the Admiral's warship has entered the Solar System and he is coming to Earth. If he finds out that Ned hasn't gone ahead with destroying Earth, Cornelius and B.E.T.I claim that the Admiral will do the job himself causing Ned to do one final show to convince his father not to destroy Earth and dedicate it to his father. Jason Ritter talks about how he stopped trying to live up to the responsibilities that his father John Ritter and his grandfather Tex Ritter had, how his father didn't order him to be an actor and how it felt to feel strange to share him with the world, what he does with his father, advice on how Ned should handle his father. After Cornelius remembers his family and the planet Cornassus, Ned dispatches him to learn how to become the world's best party planner where he meets a man named Keith who is grilling food at a backyard boogie that his family members are attending as he is given advice to resign. Ned has a CLOD named CLOD-nelius grown to take his place as B.E.T.I. tries to get Ned to get the destruction of Earth underway by firing the weapons on Chicago enough to leave a hole on Earth. Before it can happen, Tig Notaro is brought onto the ship where she states that she didn't know that she wanted to do stand-off, did her first stand-up at a coffee shop in West Hollywood, what she shares in her comedy, how she deals with her family, how she stays calm, and claiming that Ned's crew would be a family to him. Ned then proceeds to do his final update on Earth to the admiral stating that it is not happening because of humans are a wonderful species worth saving except for Ben Schwartz, his crew is his family, and Earth is now his home. His broadcast is interrupted by a special report where a newsman reports on a spaceship hovering over Minneapolis and St. Paul, advises everyone to go be with their family as the end might be near, and even mentions his own regrets. People in an office look outside to see what is happening except for Zupinzalad under the alias of "Ernest Zupinzalad" who is busy on his computer. Cornelius sees the Admiral's spaceship in the sky while at Keith's house. B.E.T.I. quotes "He's here". Ned then quotes "Daddy".

== Release ==
Earth to Ned premiered on September 4, 2020, on Disney+. New episodes were released on January 1, 2021.

== Reception ==
=== Critical response ===
On the review aggregator website Rotten Tomatoes, 83% of 12 critics' reviews are positive, with an average rating of 6.60/10. The website's consensus reads, "With imaginative puppeteering and a dose of infectious sweetness, Earth to Ned is an intergalactic treat from the Jim Henson Company."

Anne Victoria Clark of Vulture called Earth to Ned a "joyful answer to our darkest worry," writing "At a time when it can feel like we have plenty of reasons to give up on humanity, it's refreshing to see how hard Ned is rooting for us. If The Muppet Show helped '70s America rediscover irreverent joy, Earth to Ned might be here to convince 2020 America that our world is worth saving." Joel Keller of Decider asserted, "Earth To Ned is weird, funny and actually heartwarming, a formula that's right in the Henson wheelhouse."

Robert Lloyd of Los Angeles Times ranked included the show in their "10 best TV shows of 2020" list, saying, "The humor is dry, the rhythms are loose and the mood is friendly, with a touch of acid." Garrett Martin of Paste ranked Earth to Ned 5th in their "Best Late Night Shows of 2020" list, and 14th in their "20 Funniest TV Shows of 2020" list.

=== Accolades ===
Earth to Ned was nominated for Excellence in Production Design for a Variety, Reality or Competition Series at the 2020 Art Directors Guild Awards.
