= Gaalivaana =

Indian Telugu-language crime thriller series

- Genre: Mystery; Crime thriller
- Created by: Harry and Jack Williams
- Based on: One of Us
- Screenplay by: Chandra Pemmaraju; Siddharth Hirwe; Riya Poojary; Anuj Rajoria
- Story by: Chandra Pemmaraju (also dialogues)
- Directed by: Sharan Koppisetty
- Creative director: Santosh Annaparthi
- Starring: Sai Kumar; Radhika Sarathkumar; Chandini Chowdary; Ashritha Vemughanti; Nandini Rai; Sri Lakshmi; Chaitanya Krishna; Surya Srinivas
- Music by: Hari Gowra
- Country of origin: India
- Original language: Telugu
- No. of seasons: 1
- No. of episodes: 7

Production
- Executive producers: Deepali Handa; Neelima S. Marar
- Producers: Sameer Gogate; Sharrath Marar
- Cinematography: Sujatha Siddharth
- Editor: Santhosh Kamireddy
- Production companies: BBC Studios; Northstar Entertainment

Original release
- Network: ZEE5
- Release: 14 April 2022

Gaalivaana (transl. Storm) is a 2022 Indian Telugu-language mystery crime-thriller web series directed by Sharan Koppisetty with the story adapted and written by Chandra Pemmaraju. Produced by BBC Studios in association with Northstar Entertainment, the series has an ensemble cast of Radhika Sarathkumar, Sai Kumar, Chandini Chowdary, Nandini Rai, Chaitanya Krishna, Thagubothu Ramesh, Sharanya Pradeep and Ashritha Vemuganti.

Based on BBC's original series One of Us, it premiered on 14 April 2022 on ZEE5. The series was simultaneously dubbed and released in Tamil as Kaarmegam.

== Synopsis ==
Ajay Varma and Geetha are childhood sweethearts, recently married and have just returned from their honeymoon. They are full of hope for the future-until their young lives are cut short by their brutal murder. Their two families, once split by old rifts, are now forced together in rage and grief. When the man who killed Ajay and Geetha crashes back into their lives, they face a choice that will have dark consequences for all of them. As they stumble down the dangerous path they've chosen, their journey twists and turns towards its devastating end.

== Cast ==
- Sai Kumar as Komarraju, Geetha's father
- Ashrita Vemuganti as Tulasi
  - Yashna Chowdary as Young Tulasi
- Chandini Chowdary as Shravani
- Nandini Rai as Nandini IPS
- Radhika Sarathkumar as Saraswathi, Ajay Varma, Shravani, and Marthand's mother
- Keshav Deepak as Ravindra Varma
  - Karthik as Young Ravindra Varma
- Chaitanya Krishna as Marthand
- Thagubothu Ramesh as SI Anjaneyulu; Nandini's close confident.
- Sharanya Pradeep as Jyothi
- Armaan as Srikanth
- Charith as Ajay Varma
- Nikhitha Shree as Geetha
- Nanaji Karri as Patamata Srinu
- Sri Lakshmi as Shakuntala
- Satish Saripalli as Satyanaryana
- Surabhi Jaya Chandra as Suribabu
- Naveen Sanaka as David Varma
- Surya Sreenivas as Dev
- Arun as Arjun Naidu
- Rohini Naidu as Latha

== Episodes ==
No.	Title	Directed by	Written by	Original release date
1	"The storm is coming"	Sharan Koppisetty	Chandra Pemmaraju	14 April 2022
Childhood sweethearts Ajay Varma and Geetha are brutally murdered on their return from the honeymoon. Soon their devastated families discover the identity of a badly injured stranger who turns up on their doorstep.
2	"One of us knows it all"	Sharan Koppisetty	Chandra Pemmaraju	14 April 2022
Nandini, a police officer from Vizag to investigate the young couple's murder. The two families have new problem to deal with, as they realise they are not above crime.
3	"The buried truth"	Sharan Koppisetty	Chandra Pemmaraju	14 April 2022
While both families struggle to hide the crime, someone among them is hiding the truth from everyone. Saraswathi stumbles upon something that either solve it all, or create a big dilemma for her.
4	"The knife knows the killer"	Sharan Koppisetty	Chandra Pemmaraju	14 April 2022
Savitri blackmails Komarraju to not reveal Srikanth's visit to the cattle barn the night Srinu died. Nandini is terrified to see the news of the young guy's death because of the drugs she supplied. Meanwhile, Ravindra Varma commits suicide, and Marthand gets arrested.
5	"Is it right to be wrong"	Sharan Koppisetty	Chandra Pemmaraju	14 April 2022
David Raju warns Nandini to help him escape the city. Srikanth leaks a shocking information to the police. Nandini and the police team find the clue they’ve been searching for.
6	"A truth greater than confession"	Sharan Koppisetty	Chandra Pemmaraju	14 April 2022
The two families are taken into custody. Finally, Marthand confesses to murder. Sravani's world shatters when Shakantulamma reveals the truth to her.
7	"An innocent mind knows no boundaries"	Sharan Koppisetty	Chandra Pemmaraju	14 April 2022
Shakuntala reveals how overlooking something in the past has now caught up to destroy two families. Saraswathi unleashes a mother's wrath. Tulasi crumbles while Komarraju realises everything that he has been holding on to is false.

== Production ==
In December 2021, Telangana Today reported that P. Sai Kumar is making his debut in web series. The makers told the media house that "We have already started the shoot of the web series. It's the first time that a European show has been adapted into Telugu. Suitable changes have been made to the original to suit the Telugu nativity,” said the makers. BBC is entering the regional market with the show." The final schedule of filming the series began in Gachibowli, Hyderabad in January 2022 and ended in February 2022.

== Reception ==
Thadhagath Pathi of The Times of India gave a rating of 2.5 out of 5 and praised the performance of lead actors P. Sai Kumar and Radhika Sarathkumar. Pinkvilla stated that it is "fairly gripping thriller that comes with a shocking twist" and also praised performances of lead actors. Echoing the same, a reviewer of Sakshi felt that mid episodes of the series were slow-paced but worked well. 123Telugu gave a rating of 3 out of 5 and wrote that "On the whole, Gaalivaana is a decent crime thriller that offers stellar performances by Sai Kumar, Radhika Sarathkumar and a couple of other actors. Some scenes in a couple of episodes make you press the forward button. Especially, the climax portion could have been written well to make the series a great thriller."

Nelki Naresh of Hindustan Times appreciated the performances and writing.
