= Arjun Gupta (actor) =

American actor

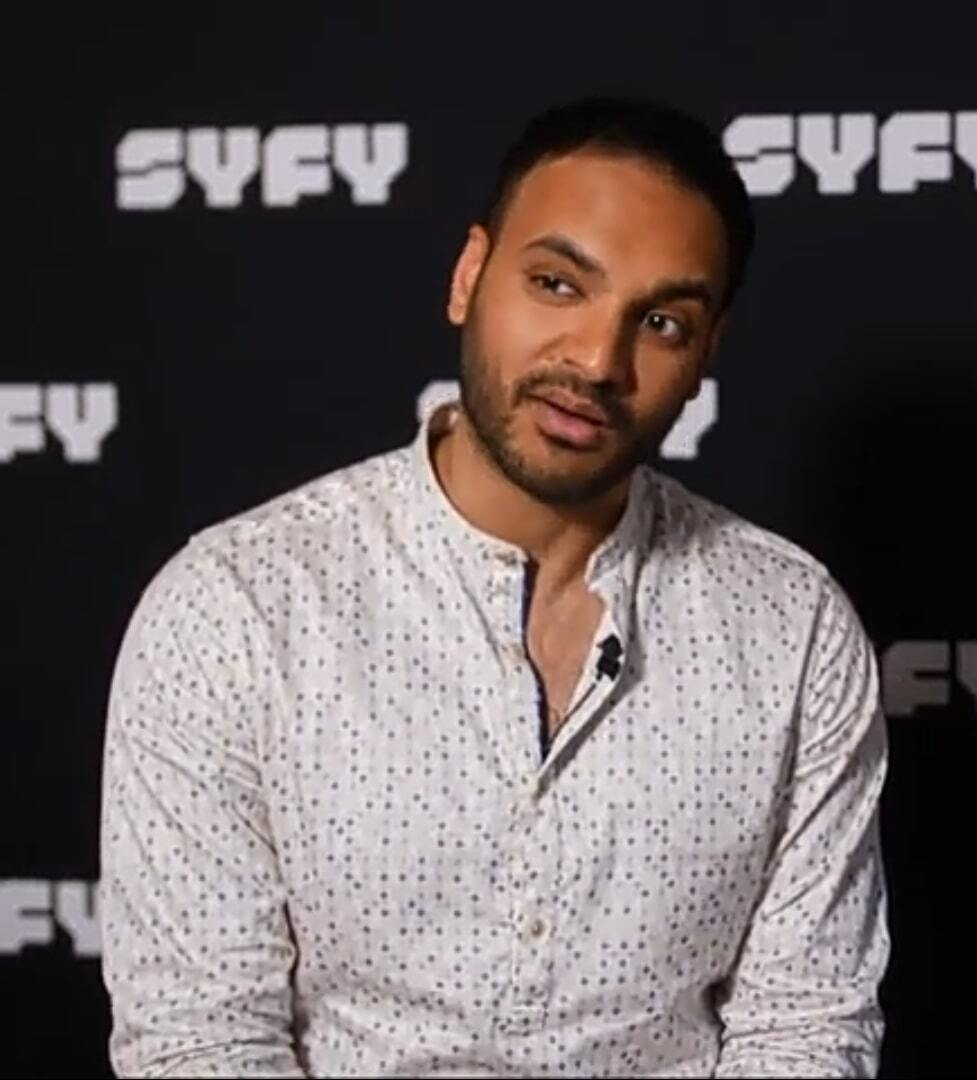
- Gupta in 2018
- Born: November 28, 1986 (age 39); Tampa, Florida, United States
- Occupation: Actor
- Years active: 2008–present
- Children: 1

Arjun Gupta (born November 28, 1986) is an American actor. He is known for his roles as substance-addicted nurse Sam on Showtime's Nurse Jackie and William "Penny" Adiyodi on Syfy's The Magicians.

== Life and career ==
Gupta was born in Tampa, Florida, United States to an Indian immigrant family. His father's name is Lalit, but known locally as "Al" and his mother is Anubha, but also known locally as "Annie", to help fit in with American life. He attended Berkeley Preparatory School, where he performed in several school plays. Subsequently, he went to New York University's Tisch School of the Arts where he graduated with a BFA degree in 2007. His first major motion picture was in 2009 acting alongside Uma Thurman in Motherhood.

In addition to acting and producing, Gupta co-founded a theater group in Southern California with other like-minded artists with the goal of providing a platform for underrepresented groups through the medium of original stories and re-tellings of classics that reflect the world today.

Gupta was among the 2012 Screen Actors Guild Awards nominees for Outstanding Performance by an Ensemble in a Comedy series. He also co-hosts the American Desis podcast with comedian Akaash Singh. Gupta voices the character Nikhil Sharma on the podcast Ars Paradoxica. He also won the 2014 Maverick Movie Awards Best Supporting actor award for his role in Bridge and Tunnel.

== Personal life ==
On April 9, 2018, he announced via Instagram that he was engaged to Varsha Harlalka. They were married the following year, in March 2019.

== Filmography ==
Film appearances by Arjun Gupta
| Year | Title | Role | Notes |
|---|---|---|---|
| 2009 | Motherhood | Mikesh | |
| 2012 | Love, Lies and Seeta | Rahul Mehra | |
| 2012 | Stand Up Guys | Dj | |
| 2013 | HairBrained | Princeton One | |
| 2014 | Bridge and Tunnel | Terry | |
| 2015 | The Diabolical | Nikolai | |
| 2015 | French Dirty | Steve | |
| 2025 | Love, Brooklyn | Patient | |

Television appearances by Arjun Gupta
| Year | Title | Role | Notes |
|---|---|---|---|
| 2009 | Redemption Falls | Tom | Television film |
| 2009 | Fringe | MIT guy #1 | 1 episode |
| 2009 | DeSiCiTi | Manbir | Television film |
| 2009–2012 | Nurse Jackie | Sam | Recurring role (seasons 1–4) |
| 2012 | Body of Proof webisodes | Raj Patel | Miniseries |
| 2012 | Checked Out | Rajit | 3 episodes |
| 2013 | Company Town | Jack | Television film |
| 2013 | Baby Sellers | Dilip | Television film |
| 2014 | Next Time on Lonny | Scott | 1 episode |
| 2014 | CSI: Crime Scene Investigation | Jack Ferris | 1 episode |
| 2014 | Gretch & Tim | Mike | Television film |
| 2014 | How to Get Away with Murder | Kan | 5 episodes |
| 2015 | The Walker | Michael | 3 episodes |
| 2015 | Limitless | Eli Whitford | 1 episode |
| 2015–2020 | The Magicians | Penny Adiyodi | Main role |
| 2016 | Powerhouse | Ravi | 1 episode |
