= Dilation (album) =

Live album by Rory Scovel
- Released: October 4, 2011
- Recorded: Punch Line San Francisco, April 2011
- Genre: Comedy
- Length: 59:58
- Label: Stand Up! Records

Rory Scovel chronology
| Dilation (2011) | Rory Scovel Live at Third Man Records (2013) |

Dilation is the debut album by comedian Rory Scovel released digitally on October 4, 2011 by Stand Up! Records.

== Track listing ==
| No. | Title | Length |
|---|---|---|
| 1. | "Hunger" | 5:45 |
| 2. | "Drive" | 5:33 |
| 3. | "Walk" | 4:41 |
| 4. | "Relax/Sit" | 9:20 |
| 5. | "Eat" | 2:48 |
| 6. | "Breathe" | 8:53 |
| 7. | "Expand" | 4:30 |
| 8. | "Wake Up" | 2:17 |
| 9. | "Smile" | 7:43 |
| 10. | "Live" | 5:59 |
| 11. | "Remember" | 4:06 |

== Reception ==
Dilation was met with positive reviews upon its release. The A.V. Club named it the 6th best comedy album of 2011, saying, "Dilation effortlessly bounces around myriad topics, and lets Scovel be an expert at all of them." LaughSpin says, "if you consider yourself a bit of comedy scholar, you’ll likely find great pleasure in Scovel’s unorthodox approach to cracking wise." The Huffington Post named Scovel and the album in their Guide to New Comedy Albums of 2011, saying, "He'll typically spiral a setup and punchline in circles and play with an audience's expectations with a masterfulness rarely seen in comedy today."
