= Foreign Exchange (2008 film) =

- Directed by: Danny Roth
- Written by: Elliot Phear; Joel Solomon; Tyler McGee; Danny Roth
- Produced by: Robert E. Baruc; Chris Cowels; Stan Erdreich; Chris Fenton; Jason Koren; Kevin McCafferty; Tyler McGee; Michael Parness; Elana Pianko; Danny Roth; Greg Weiss
- Edited by: Rob Krauss; John Quinn
- Production companies: Sychophant Films; Casting House; Full Glass Films; Shoot Productions
- Release date: September 9, 2008
- Country: United States
- Language: English

Foreign Exchange is a 2008 American independent film directed by Danny Roth.

== Production ==
The film's screenplay was by Joel Solomon and Elliott Phear.

== Plot ==
Four high school friends decide to take all easy classes their last year of high school. One of their classes is a program for housing foreign exchange students. The four students are having troubles with grades, aspirations and love and are helped out by the foreign exchange students that they were supposed to be helping out.

== Cast ==
- Ryan Pinkston ..... Dave
- Vanessa Lengies ..... Robyn
- Randy Wayne ..... Jay Noble
- Tania Raymonde ..... Anita Duarte
- Daniel Booko ..... Gordon "Shantz" Lally
- Aaron Hill ..... Christopher Hunter
- Jennifer Coolidge ..... Principal Lonnatini
- Ashley Edner ..... Jez
- Jessika Van ..... Mia Ho
- Curtis Armstrong ..... Marvin
- Clint Howard ..... Long Larry

== Production ==
The film was shot in Los Angeles, California.

== Home media ==
Foreign Exchange was released om DVD by FilmRise.

== Reception ==
Don Houston of DVD Talk wrote in his review: "could go into great detail about the specific elements of the movie but aside from pointing out there was a pool party, various hijinks relating to school, drug use, and a camping expedition, none of them worth your time considering how many funny movies are available at this writing."
