= Omi Vaidya =

American actor (born 1982)

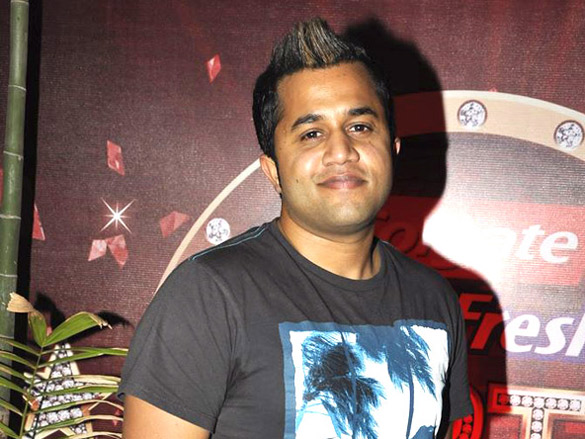
- Vaidya in 2011
- Born: January 10, 1982 (age 44); Yucca Valley, California, United States
- Education: University of California, Santa Cruz; Tisch School of Arts, New York University
- Occupations: Actor; film director; film editor; writer; television presenter
- Years active: 2003–present
- Known for: 3 Idiots (2009)
- Spouse: Minal Patel (m. 2009)
- Children: 2

Omi Vaidya (born January 10, 1982) is an American actor in Hindi cinema. He is best known for his performance as Chatur Ramalingam or "Silencer" in the 2009 comedy-drama film, 3 Idiots. In addition, Vaidya has played roles on The Office and Arrested Development. Omi has directed many short films and worked as a feature film editor. He has also appeared in a number of commercials and works as a producer.

== Background ==
Vaidya was raised in Joshua Tree in Yucca Valley, California. He graduated from the Los Angeles County High School for the Arts and later attended the University of California, Santa Cruz for two years. He then transferred to the Tisch School of the Arts at New York University and graduated with honors.

Vaidya commented on his background in an interview:

I live in Los Angeles, USA. That's where I grew up, but every year we used to come to India. My native place in India is Goa and I also did visit Mumbai quite often during my growing up days. I started acting when I was about six in Marathi mandal nataks and some English plays in the US. I learned more about acting in high school and that's when I became really serious about films as a career. I went to NYU film school and learned the ropes of filmmaking, editing, acting, etc. I learned the technical language used on the sets. After graduating in honors from NYU, I went back to Los Angeles and began auditioning for roles in T.V. serials and films.

== Career ==
After college, Vaidya began to work as an editor for horror and South Asian feature films. He continued to act as well and received small roles in television programs and commercials. After receiving a small role in Arrested Development, he was asked to audition for the role of Sadiq for The Office by the same casting director. He portrayed Sadiq in two episodes: "E-mail Surveillance" and "Fun Run." He was also seen in Bones.

=== 3 Idiots ===
Vaidya's most notable performance is in a supporting role in the 2009 Bollywood film, 3 Idiots as Chatur Ramalingam (or "The Silencer"). He received strong reviews for his performance. Vaidya auditioned for the role of Chatur while on a trip to Mumbai. After passing the first audition, he was asked during the second to read dialogue from Lage Raho Munna Bhai. Vaidya states that he "just rattled it off without exactly understanding the words, almost like the speech scene in 3 Idiots." After being signed for the part of Chatur, he was told not to study Hindi, not to watch Hindi films, and to gain weight.

Of his success in the film, Vaidya credits the atmosphere of the cast and crew stating that in Mumbai there is "a personal touch, unlike Hollywood. Even if they don't pay you by the hour and there is no extra time, there is warmth and care. I basically saw my Bollywood innings as a challenge. A lot of credit also goes to Raju and Abhijat Joshi for the way the character came across on screen." He was also discouraged from providing interviews before the release. Vaidya states: "Before the film released, I asked director Rajkumar Hirani if I could give a couple of interviews. He stopped me saying nobody knew me and I should wait till the film is released. My role was a surprise they had planned for the audience." Vaidya later recalled that, "When I was at the premiere of 3 Idiots, no one recognized me. I was a bit depressed but when it got over, it was difficult for me to even get out of the theater. I have been enamored by the love and appreciation I have received from the audience. Today, when I go out on streets, people come and shake hands with me. It feels nice."

=== Big in Bollywood ===
Big in Bollywood (2011) is a documentary film about American actor Omi Vaidya's journey from a struggling Hollywood actor to a successful Bollywood breakthrough with 3 Idiots. It was sold to Netflix and is now available on YouTube.

== Awards ==
2010 Screen Awards

- Won: Best Comedian – 3 Idiots
- Won: Most Promising Newcomer – Male – 3 Idiots

2010 IIFA Awards

- Nominated: Best Performance in a Comic Role – 3 Idiots
- Won: Star Debut of the Year – Male – 3 Idiots

2008 The Valley Film Festival

- Won: Best Short Film – The Desert Rose

2008 Port Townsend Film Festival

- Won: Best Film with Diversity Theme – The Desert Rose

2008 The Valley Film Festival

- Won: Best Student Film – Out of Time

== Selected filmography ==
=== Films ===
Year	Film	Role	Notes	Ref.
2007	Rolling	Assar		
2009	3 Idiots	Chatur Ramalingam a.k.a. "The Silencer"		
2011	Big in Bollywood	Himself	Documentary	
2011	Dil Toh Bachcha Hai Ji	Milind Kelkar		
2011	Desi Boyz	Ajay		
2012	Players	Sunny Mehra		
2012	Jodi Breakers	Nainsukhbhai Chamanlal Patel a.k.a. Nano		
2015	For Here or to Go	Lakshmi	Indian-American film	
2017	Mirror Game	Vikram		
2018	Blackmail	Boss DK		
2018	Astro	Dr. Ramesh		
2023	MR-9 : Do or Die	Faisal	American-Bangladeshi film	
2024	Aaichya Gavat Marathi Bol		Also director; Marathi film	

=== Television series ===
Year	TV Show	Role	Notes
2005–2007	The Office	Sadiq	Episodes: "E-mail Surveillance" "Fun Run"
2008	Life	Vairam	
2008	Bones	Hamid Hirani	Episode: The Crank in the Shaft
2009	Kath & Kim	Prakash	
2009	Kamen Rider: Dragon Knight	Fish	
2014	Growing Up Fisher	Elliot	
2016	Brown Nation	Balan Sree Ramakrishnan	
2019—present	Metro Park (web series)	Kannan	

=== As director ===
Year	Film	Notes
2007	Out of Time	Short Film
2007	The Desert Rose	Short Film

=== As editor ===
Year	Film	Notes
2003	Out of Time	Short Film
2004	Delusion	Short Film
2005	Bloodshed	Short Film
2006	The Gold Bracelet	Short Film
2007	Remember the Days	Short Film
2008	Blind Ambition	Short Film

== Personal life ==
Vaidya married Minal Patel on August 22, 2009. In 2015, Minal gave birth to their first child. Their second child was born in 2018. He is of Marathi descent.
