= Robbie (TV series) =

American comedy television series

- Genre: Comedy
- Created by: Rory Scovel; Stuart Jenkins; Scott Moran; Anthony King
- Starring: Rory Scovel; Sasheer Zamata; Mary Holland; Tre Stokes; Jill Jane Clements; Beau Bridges
- Country of origin: United States
- Original language: English
- No. of seasons: 1
- No. of episodes: 8

Production
- Executive producers: Rory Scovel; Anthony King; Scott Moran; Will Ferrell; Adam McKay; Betsy Koch; Owen Burke
- Camera setup: Single-camera
- Running time: 30 minutes
- Production company: Gary Sanchez Productions

Original release
- Network: CC.com
- Release: May 7, 2020

Robbie is an American comedy television series created by Rory Scovel, Stuart Jenkins, Scott Moran, and Anthony King. The series premiered on Comedy Central on May 7, 2020, and its entire first season was released on Comedy Central's YouTube channel, app, website, and on demand immediately following its premiere.

== Premise ==
Robbie, an overzealous small town youth basketball coach, attempts to step out of his father's shadow and lead his team to glory.

== Cast ==
- Rory Scovel as Robbie
- Sasheer Zamata as Ava
- Mary Holland as Janie
- Tre Stokes as Caleb
- Jill Jane Clements as Beatrice
- Beau Bridges as Robbie Walton Sr.

== Episodes ==
No.	Title	Directed by	Written by	Original release date
1	"Pilot"	Payman Benz	Story by : Rory Scovel & Stu Jenkins & Scott Moran and Anthony King; Teleplay by : Rory Scovel & Anthony King	May 7, 2020
2	"Robbie vs. the Room of Dreams"	Payman Benz	Anthony King	May 7, 2020
3	"Robbie vs. Rooney"	Payman Benz	Sean Clements	May 7, 2020
4	"Robbie vs. Tight Pants Tom"	Scott Moran	Rachelle Williams	May 7, 2020
5	"Robbie vs. Sugartown"	Anu Valia	Shaun Diston	May 7, 2020
6	"Robbie vs. Piano Chicken"	Anu Valia	Langan Kingsley & Mary Sasson	May 7, 2020
7	"Robbie vs. Ava vs. Danielle"	Payman Benz	Sean Clements	May 7, 2020
8	"Robbie vs. Janie's Husband"	Payman Benz	Anthony King	May 7, 2020
