= For Here or to Go? =

- Film poster
- Directed by: Rucha Humnabadkar
- Written by: Rishi Bhilawadikar
- Produced by: Rishi Bhilawadikar; CC Chainey; Rucha Humnabadkar; Vineet Sinha
- Starring: Ali Fazal; Melanie Chandra; Gaurav Dwivedi
- Cinematography: Tristan Nyby
- Edited by: Abhijit Deshpande
- Music by: Peter Scartabello; Manesh Judge; Ajit Singh
- Production company: Many Cups of Chai Films
- Release dates: February 2015 (Cinequest); 31 March 2017 (United States); 6 July 2018 (India)
- Running time: 105 minutes
- Countries: India; United States
- Language: English

For Here or to Go? is a 2015 Indian-American comedy drama film directed by Rucha Humnabadkar and starring Ali Fazal, Melanie Chandra and Gaurav Dwivedi.The film premiered at the 2015 South Asian International Film Festival.

== Plot ==
Vivek Pandit is an immigrant from India. While his visa was intact, he was hired as a software engineer at Fortune 500 company, Meridian Labs Corporate in Silicon Valley, California. However, when his visa is expired, he becomes the fighter against American immigration system in order to keep his immigration status and his job alive.

== Cast ==
- Ali Fazal as Vivek Pandit
- Melanie Chandra as Shveta
- Rajit Kapur as Vishwanath Prabhu
- Amitosh Nagpal as Amit
- Omi Vaidya as Lakshmi
- Samrat Chakrabarti as Sam
- Keith Stevenson as Raj Mehta
- Anita Vora as Priya
- Damien Chen as George
- Dee Marshall as Karen
- Alan Coyne as David
- Viji Nathan as Ma
- Robin Oleson as Carol Mehta
- Sathish Sattnathan as Raju
- Prashant Shindgikar as Visa Baba
- Gaurav Dwivedi as Ravi
- Sonalee Hardikar as Ravi's mother
- Amol Deshmane as Lakshmi's friend
- Abhimanyu Sarkar as friend
- Akaash Yadav as flash mob dancer
- Natosha Wengreen as yoga studio receptionist
- Christina Enneking as yoga instructor
- Sheila Dobee as attorney
- Apo W. Bazidi as Meridian Labs immigrant founder
- Kafi Payne as HR lady
- Kate Greenwood as Meridian Labs Corporate woman
- Rachel Lassman as special dating hostess
- Richa Moorjani as journalist at Speed Date
- Ajay Jain Bhutoria as man at the bar
- Mukund Marathe as audience member
- Rose Oser as girl in the grocery store
- Gursimran Singh as Gurmeet
- Samantha Solomon as deli cashier
- Ashok Tangri as Satpal Singh
- Ken Thrift as office worker
- Rashmi Rustagi as FBI officer #1
- Bekka Fink as FBI officer #2
- Kace Marshall as Junesco hiring manager
- Christina Marini as Junesco receptionist
- Angel Ordaz as Junesco engineer
- Abhay Paranjape as Desi engineer #1
- Girish Sherikar as Desi engineer #2
- Anuj Nijhawan as Desi engineer #3

== Reception ==
The film has a 41% rating on Rotten Tomatoes based on six reviews, with . On Metacritic, For Here or to Go? has a rank of 56 out of a 100 based on 4 critics, indicating "mixed or average" reviews.

Namrata Joshi of The Hindu wrote "Ali Fazal remains likeable despite all the mess surrounding him and Rajit Kapur as a veteran techie pining for India is all sincere in a film that he doesn't deserve to be trapped in".

Writing for The Hollywood Reporter, Frank Scheck commented "The subject matter's topicality doesn't provide sufficient compensation for the many dull patches in Rucha Humnabadkar's comedy/drama about a young Indian immigrant struggling to get his work visa extended".

Daphne Howland of The Village Voice had a different take on the film, her view was "There's nothing new about immigrants to America making compromises in their new country, but in the comic drama For Here or to Go?, the story gets a chai-infused, Silicon Valley-mired twist".

According to Tom Keogh of The Seattle Times "For Here or to Go? offers an insightful group portrait but lacks imagination in a romantic subplot and (except for a requisite Bollywood-style dance number) is visually dreary".

Eddie Cockrell of Variety pointed out that "Bhilawadikar's too-busy script nevertheless scores legitimate points", while Michael Rechtshaffen of the Los Angeles Times added "In attempting to address its many concerns, the film's agreeable, lightly satirical tone gives way to increasingly didactic dialogue and a stalling pace".

Awarding the film with 2.5 stars out of 5, Pallabi Dey Purkayastha of The Times of India wrote "For Here or To Go[?] is one of those indie flicks that have a good premise but lack depth in storytelling".
