= Sake-Bomb =

2013 Japanese-American film

- Film poster
- Directed by: Junya Sakino
- Written by: Jeff Mizushima
- Produced by: Junya Sakino; Hiromitsu Senoo
- Starring: Gaku Hamada; Eugene Kim; Marlane Barnes; Josh Brodis; Samantha Quan; Hiroyuki Watanabe; Dat Phan; Mary Carey; Denden
- Cinematography: Sam Yano
- Edited by: Jeff Mizushima
- Music by: Daichi Yoshida
- Production companies: Pictures Dept.; Buffalo 8 Productions; DiVerse Pictures
- Release date: March 8, 2013 (SXSW)
- Running time: 82 minutes
- Countries: United States; Japan
- Language: English

Sake-Bomb is a 2013 film directed by Junya Sakino, written by Jeff Mizushima, and starring Gaku Hamada and Eugene Kim as cousins who embark on a road trip in California. It is a shared Japanese and American production. It premiered at the 2013 SXSW film festival.

== Plot ==
After his girlfriend dumps him, Sebastian, a cynical and bitter Asian-American vlogger, meets his cousin Naoto, a Japanese tourist. Naoto has come to America to follow his ex-girlfriend, who left him without any explanation. Seeking answers for their respective relationship issues, the two embark on a road trip that results in culture clash between the two cousins and wider American culture.

== Cast ==
- Gaku Hamada as Naota
- Eugene Kim as Sebastian
- Marlane Barnes as Joslyn
- Josh Brodis as Michael
- Denden as Masa
- Chrissie Fit as Edie
- Samantha Quan as Tamiko
- Hiroyuki Watanabe as Takanori
- Jessika Van as Annie
- Jenn Liu as Olivia
- Dat Phan as Long Wang
- Mary Carey as Ms. Robinson

== Production ==
Besides a comedy enjoyable without thinking about heavy themes, director Sakino wanted to offer audiences subject matter with which broad audiences could identify if they looked closer. Aspects of the film were based on real experiences that Sakino and writer Mizushima faced as Asians in America. The crew was multicultural, and this caused real-life culture clashes.

== Release ==
Sake-Bomb premiered at the 2013 South by Southwest film festival. It was distributed in the UK by Third Window Films and in the US by First Pond.

== Reception ==
Kaori Shoji of The Japan Times rated it 3.5/5 stars and wrote, "It has its good points, but on the other hand, Sake Bomb seems to pander a bit much to the insecurities and sense of inadequacy that are a big part of life for Japanese living in America." Inkoo Kang of the Los Angeles Times called it "a thoughtful and moving road-trip dramedy" that is hurt by Mizushima's editing. Jamie S. Rich of The Oregonian wrote, "Sake-Bomb is a road-tripping culture-clash comedy with something to say, even though it's not always good at saying it." James Mudge of Beyond Hollywood described it as "a very enjoyable mix of serious and intriguing themes with a commercially friendly road-buddy comedy in the traditional Hollywood style."

The film won Best Narrative Feature at the 2013 San Diego Asian Film Festival. Mizushima won Outstanding Screenplay at the Los Angeles Asian Pacific Film Festival.
