= Rory Scovel =

American comedian and actor (born 1980)

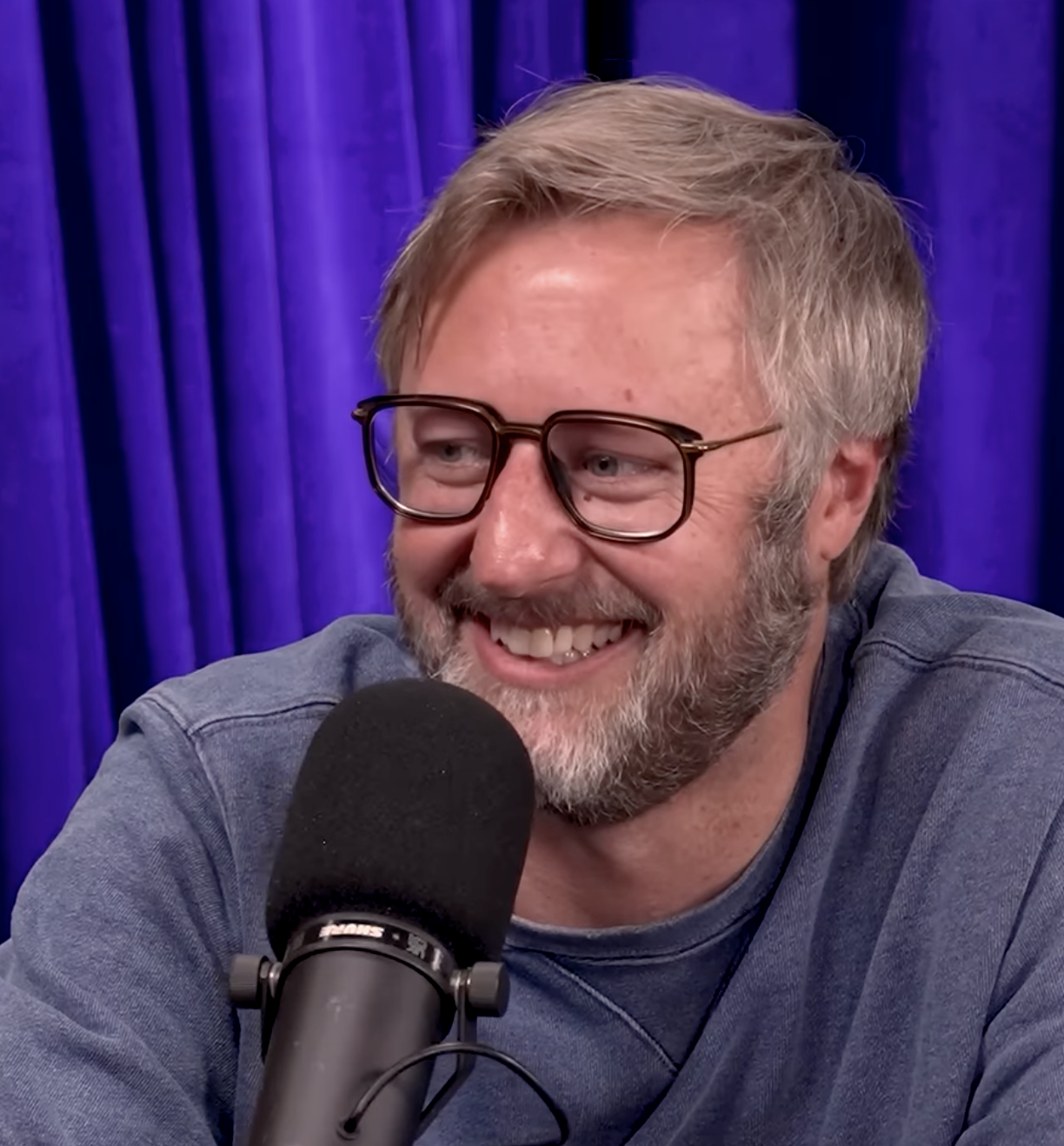
- Scovel in 2026
- Born: August 6, 1980 (age 46); Greenville, South Carolina, U.S.
- Occupations: Comedian; actor; writer
- Years active: 2004–present
- Spouse: Jordan Boughrum
- Children: 1
- Website: roryscovel.com

Rory J. Scovel (born August 6, 1980) is an American comedian, actor, and writer. He released his first stand-up comedy album Dilation in 2011. He has since released the stand-up specials The Charleston Special (2015), Rory Scovel Tries Stand-Up for the First Time (2017), Live Without Fear (2021), Religion, Sex, and a Few Things in Between (2024), and Show Must Go On (2026).

As an actor, he began his career as part of the main cast on the sitcoms Ground Floor (2013–2015) and Those Who Can't (2016–2019), co-starred in the romantic comedy film I Feel Pretty (2018), and also appeared in and wrote for the comedy series The Eric Andre Show (2012–2016). In the 2020s, he created and starred in his Comedy Central series Robbie (2020) and starred in the Apple TV+ series Physical (2021–2023).

== Early life ==
Rory J. Scovel was born in Greenville, South Carolina, on August 6, 1980. He has six siblings. He played basketball, tennis, and soccer as a child, and has described himself as hyperactive and a class clown. He attended St. Mary's Catholic School, then Christ Church Episcopal School, from kindergarten through eighth grade. He graduated from Greenville Senior High School in 1999. Scovel spent one year attending the University of Central Florida before enrolling at University of South Carolina Upstate, from which he graduated with a communications degree in 2003. While there, he played Division II soccer.

== Career ==
=== Comedy ===
Scovel first performed comedy in December 2003 at an open mic night in Spartanburg, South Carolina. He had just graduated from college and was working as a cameraman at WSPA, a local television station. The following year, he moved to Washington D.C., where he performed for three years. He then moved to New York City, where he performed for three years until he moved to Los Angeles, where he now lives.

In 2006, Scovel participated in the Seattle International Comedy Competition; he made it to the finals.

In 2010, he performed his first set for a late night show on Late Night with Jimmy Fallon. The following year, Scovel performed on Conan with comedian Jon Dore using the premise that the show had accidentally booked two comedians; Scovel would go on to perform on and be interviewed by Conan many times in the following decade. Scovel also released his first stand-up album with Stand Up! Records, Dilation. Scovel and the record were named by The Huffington Post as one of fourteen in their "Guide To New Comedy Albums of 2011".

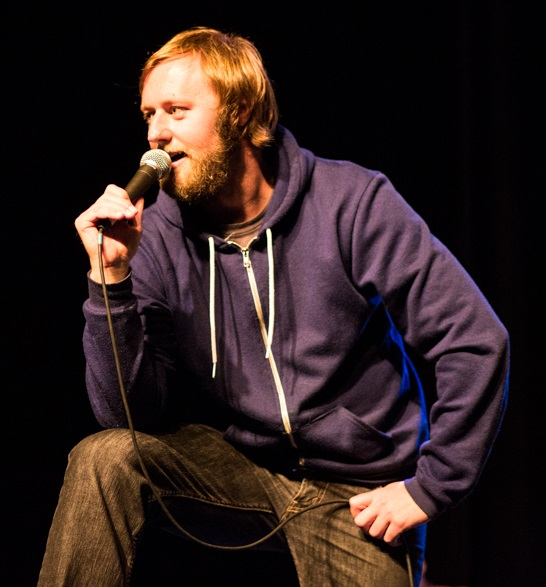
Scovel in 2013

In 2012, Scovel was named among the 10 Comics to Watch by Variety magazine. In April of that year, his set was featured on Comedy Central's The Half Hour. In 2013, he performed a show at the performance venue at Third Man Records, Jack White's record label. The live show was recorded to tape and transferred to vinyl. There is no digital version of this recording. White would later executive produce Scovel's 2017 special for Netflix.

In 2015, Scovel taped his first hour-long stand-up special at the Woolfe Street Playhouse in Charleston, South Carolina; the special was aptly named Rory Scovel: The Charleston Special. In 2017, his next special, Rory Scovel Tries Stand-Up for the First Time, was released by Netflix.

Scovel has opened for comedians such as Louis C.K., Nick Swardson, and Daniel Tosh. He has performed at the Montreal Just for Laughs Festival, the FYF Fest in Los Angeles, the Vancouver Comedy Festival, the Del Close Improv Marathon in New York, the Bumbershoot Festival in Seattle, and the Chicago Improv Festival.

=== Television and movies ===
Scovel's breakthrough acting role was as Harvard in the TBS sitcom Ground Floor. He was a main character for both seasons of the show, which aired from 2013 to 2015. Following the cancellation of Ground Floor, Scovel joined the main cast of Those Who Can't, which began airing on TruTV in 2016, reprising his role as Principal Quinn from the 2013 Amazon film of the same name. He had various small acting and voice acting roles throughout the 2010s, including recurring roles on MTV's Zach Stone Is Gonna Be Famous, NBC's Undateable, and TBS' Wrecked. Scovel had a small role in Demetri Martin's indie comedy film Dean. He had a supporting role in the 2017 wide-release comedy The House. Notably, he starred as the main love interest in the 2018 Amy Schumer comedy film I Feel Pretty.

Scovel was part of the writing staff for the second and fourth seasons of The Eric Andre Show, which aired in 2013 and 2016, respectively. He was featured in the show's "New Years Eve Spooktacular" as well as an episode in season two where he played the fictional Chef Rory Scovel.

In November 2018, it was announced that Comedy Central had green-lit an eight-episode scripted television series produced, co-written, and starring Scovel, called Robbie. In a February 2020 interview, Scovel disclosed that the show had been produced and was looking for a distributor. On May 6, 2020, Comedy Central announced that Robbie would premiere later that week. The show premiered on May 7, 2020, at which time Comedy Central released the series in its entirety on its streaming platform and YouTube. Robbie is Comedy Central's first binge-release. Recently, Scovel played the lead in the Chris Blake quarantine comedy, Distancing Socially filmed remotely using the iPhone 11. The film was acquired and released by Cinedigm in October 2021.

=== Podcasts ===
Since 2018, Scovel has co-hosted The Pen Pals Podcast with fellow comedian Daniel Van Kirk. Scovel has appeared on several popular podcasts, including Conan O'Brien Needs a Friend with Conan O'Brien, Comedy Bang! Bang! with Scott Aukerman, Doug Loves Movies with Doug Benson, Sklarbro Country with The Sklar Brothers, The Nerdist Podcast with Chris Hardwick, You Made It Weird with Pete Holmes, Maximum Fun's Stop Podcasting Yourself, The Dead Authors Podcast with Paul F. Tompkins, The Dollop live at the 2016 Riot LA Comedy Festival with Dave Anthony and Gareth Reynolds, The Todd Glass Show, and WTF with Marc Maron, Mega, and Films to Be Buried With with Brett Goldstein.

== Personal life ==
Scovel is married to actress Jordan Boughrum. They live in Los Angeles, where their daughter was born in 2015.

== Filmography ==
=== Films ===
Year	Title	Role	Notes
2007	Groom with a View	Organ Player	Short film
2009	Public Service	Leo's Agent	Voice, short film
2010	Seattle Komedy Dokumentary	Himself	
2011	Dead Monkey	Ricky	
2012	Is There?: Todd Glass for GLSEN	Party Guest	Short film
2012	Broken Mike	Himself	
2013	Documentary Subject Wanted with Rory Scovel	Himself	
2016	Dean	Eric	
2016	Reggie Watts: Spatial	Himself	
2017	The House	Joe	
2018	I Feel Pretty	Ethan	
2020	Two Pan Dan	Dan	Short film
2020	Gutbuster	Himself	
2021	Distancing Socially	Ben	
2022	Babylon	The Count	Nominated—Screen Actors Guild Award for Outstanding Performance by a Cast in a Motion Picture
2023	Old Dads	Terrance Huffy-Schwinn	
2025	You're Cordially Invited	Colton	
TBA	Judgment Day	TBA	Post-production

=== Television ===
==== As actor ====
Year	Title	Role	Notes
2011–2012	The Life & Times of Tim	Jim/Jerry	Voice, 2 episodes
2012–2016	The Eric Andre Show	Chef Rory Scovel/Himself	2 episodes; also writer for 20 episodes
2013–2015	Ground Floor	Harvard	20 episodes
2013	Zach Stone Is Gonna Be Famous	Pat	6 episodes
2014	Modern Family	Carl	Episode: "Marco Polo"
2014–2016	Undateable	Kevin	4 episodes
2016–2019	Those Who Can't	Principal Geoffrey Quinn	25 episodes
2016	Animals.	Ronnie	Voice, episode: "Dogs."
2016	Casual	Patrick	Episode: "The Magpie"
2016–2017	Wrecked	Corey	4 episodes
2017	Love	Gator	Episode: "The Work Party"
2017	The Great Indoors	Ricky	Episode: "Ricky Leaks"
2017	Powerless	Russell	Episode: "Win, Luthor, Draw"
2017	HarmonQuest	Unpredictable Witch	Episode: "Demon Realm Devilry"
2017	Do You Want To See a Dead Body?	Cool Pharmacist	Episode: "A Body and a Puddle (with Adam Scott and Terry Crews)"
2018	Another Period	Men's Club Member	Episode: "Olympics"
2018	Please Understand Me	Rory	Episode: "Rory & Natalie"
2019	Historical Roasts	William Shakespeare	Episode: "Cleopatra"
2019	Cake		Voice, episode: "Cache Flow"
2019	Mixed-ish	Bob Lee	Episode: "Papa Don't Preach"
2020–2021	Superstore	Dr. Brian Patterson	4 episodes
2020	Harley Quinn	Gus, Assassin, Maitre'd	Voice, 3 episodes
2020	Robbie	Robbie	8 episodes; also writer, creator, and executive producer
2020–2021	Black Monday	Agent Crandall	2 episodes
2021–2023	Physical	Danny Rubin	Series regular; 30 episodes
2022	Grace and Frankie	Officer Smith	Episode: "The Raccoon"
2024	Kite Man: Hell Yeah!	Gus	Voice
2024	Based on a True Story	Gustav	2 episodes
2026	Rooster	Officer Donnie Mullins	4 episodes
2026	Life, Larry and the Pursuit of Unhappiness	Jefferson Davis	Episode: "Deepthroat"

==== As himself ====
Year	Title	Role	Notes
2007	Live at Gotham	Himself	Episode #2.4
2010	Late Night with Jimmy Fallon	Himself	Episode #2.170
2011–2019	Conan	Himself	9 episodes
2011–2013	New York Stand-Up Show	Himself	2 episodes
2012	The Half Hour	Himself	Episode #1.1, also writer
2012	UnCabaret	Himself	Episode #1.4, also writer
2012	The Late Late Show with Craig Ferguson	Himself	Episode #8.242
2013	The Nerdist	Himself	Episode #1.3
2013	Funny as Hell	Himself	Episode #3.1, also writer
2013	All Growz Up with Melinda Hill	Himself	Episode: "Rory Scovel"
2013	Money From Strangers	Himself	3 episodes
2013–2017	@midnight	Himself	5 episodes
2013	The Pete Holmes Show	Himself	Episode: "Rory Scovel"
2016	Not Safe with Nikki Glaser	Himself	Episode: "Carpe Do 'Em"
2016	This Is Not Happening	Himself	Episode: 3.4 "Blunder", also writer
2018	The Jim Jeffries Show	Himself	Episode: "Questioning Trump's North Korea Strategy"
2019	2 Dope Queens	Himself	Episode: "Music"
2024	Office Hours Live with Tim Heidecker	Himself	Episode: #289

=== Stand-up specials ===
Year	Title	Released by	Notes
2011	Dilation	Stand Up! Records	
2013	Rory Scovel Live at Third Man Record	Third Man Records	
2015	Rory Scovel: The Charleston Special	Self	Released on Seeso
2017	Rory Scovel Tries Stand-Up for the First Time	Netflix	
2021	Rory Scovel: Live Without Fear	Self	Released on YouTube
2024	Rory Scovel: Religion, Sex, and a Few Things in Between	Max	
2026	Rory Scovel: Show Must Go On	Netflix	
