= Distancing Socially =

American comedy film directed and written by Chris Blake

- Official release poster
- Directed by: Chris Blake
- Written by: Chris Blake
- Produced by: Chris Blake; Milan Chakraborty; Josh Moody; Dave Moody
- Starring: Rory Scovel; Jessika Van; Alan Tudyk; Melanie Chandra; Sarah Levy; Connor Paolo; Andy Buckley; Jim O'Heir
- Cinematography: Josh Moody
- Edited by: Josh Moody
- Music by: Bryan Arata
- Production company: MonkeyRat Productions
- Distributed by: Cinedigm
- Release date: October 5, 2021
- Running time: 96 minutes
- Country: United States
- Language: English

Distancing Socially is an American comedy film funded and executive produced by Kathryne Duke, and written and directed by Chris Blake. The film stars Rory Scovel, Jessika Van, Alan Tudyk, Melanie Chandra, Sarah Levy, Connor Paolo, Andy Buckley, and Jim O'Heir.

The film was shot remotely on the iPhone 11 Pro at the height of the COVID-19 pandemic in 2020. Variety premiered the film's trailer on August 18, 2021, and announced that Cinedigm had acquired the North American rights to the film. It was released on October 5, 2021, by Cinedigm.

== Premise ==
Composed of a series of short vignettes that share a telecommunications application as a common thread, Distancing Socially focuses on loosely connected human interactions taking place virtually across a world in lockdown. The film is said to explore love, friendship, and the idea that a world of increased connectivity ironically leads to greater miscommunication.

== Cast ==
The cast includes:

- Rory Scovel
- Jessika Van
- Alan Tudyk
- Melanie Chandra
- Sarah Levy
- Connor Paolo
- Andy Buckley
- Jim O'Heir
- Emma Fitzpatrick
- Blythe Howard
- Sierra Katow
- Jay Larson
- Dawan Owens
- Willie Macc
- Ted Welch
- Graham Outerbridge
- Matthew Hancock

== Release ==
It was released on October 5, 2021, by Cinedigm.
