= Mirror Game =

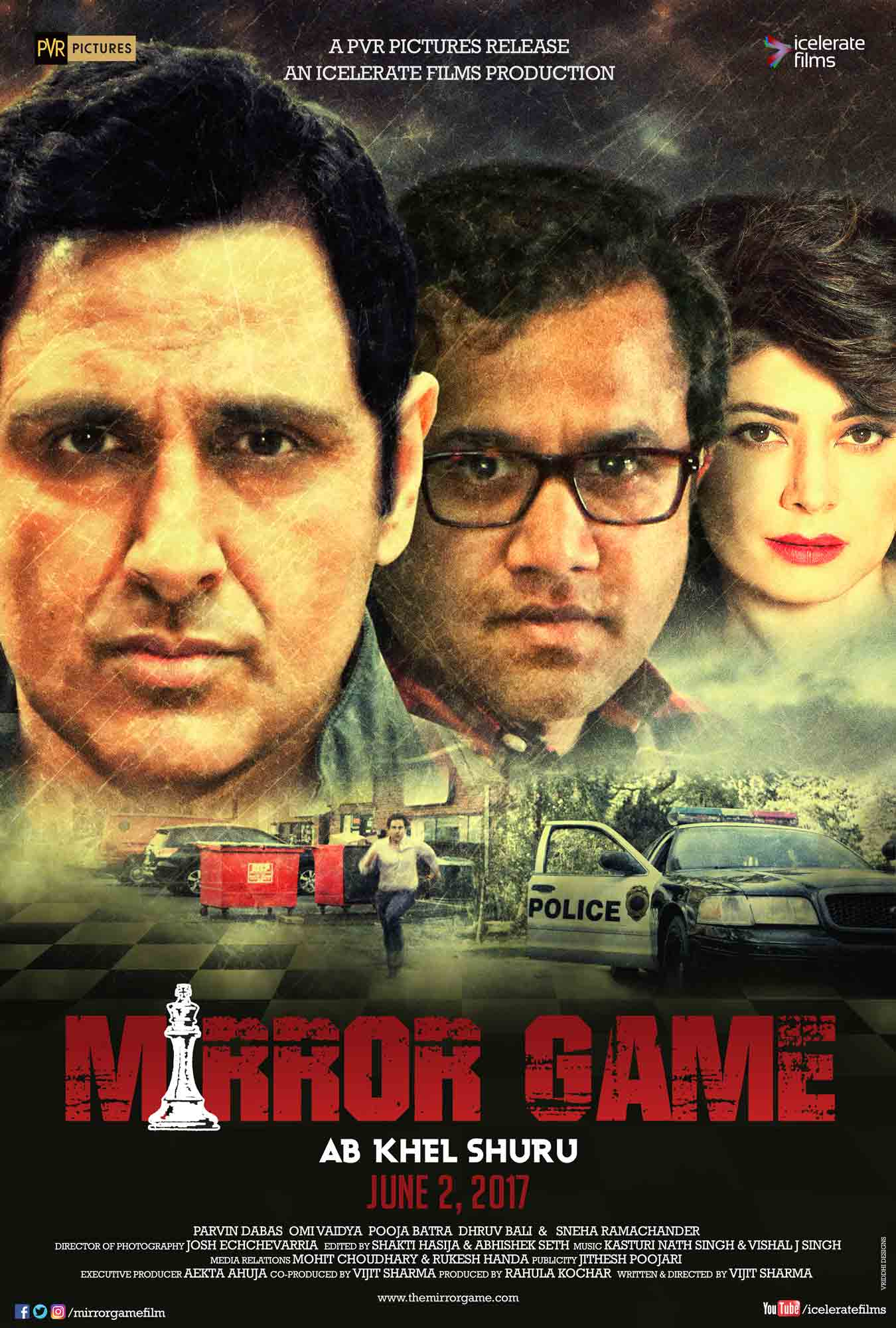
- Theatrical poster
- Directed by: Vijit Sharma
- Written by: Vijit Sharma
- Screenplay by: Vijit Sharma
- Produced by: Rahula Kochar
- Starring: Parvin Dabas, Dhruv Bali, Pooja Batra, Omi Vaidya
- Cinematography: Josh Echevarria
- Edited by: Shakti Hasija, Abhishek Seth
- Music by: Kasturi Nath Singh, Vishal J. Singh
- Production company: Icelerate Films
- Distributed by: PVR Pictures
- Release date: 2 June 2017
- Running time: 108 minutes
- Country: India
- Language: Hindi

Mirror Game is an Indian psychological thriller film written and directed by Vijit Sharma and produced by Rahula Kochar for Icelerate Films. The film was released by PVR Pictures on 2 June 2017. The film stars Parvin Dabas, Pooja Batra and Omi Vaidya in lead roles.

== Plot ==
Mirror Game follows University Professor Jay Verma. Stuck in a crumbling marriage and a failing career, Jay seeks a way out of his troubles. Ronnie, an ambitious student, approaches Professor Verma asking for help with a thesis. Verma sees this as an opportunity and, in return for his help, makes Ronnie an offer that he hopes will solve all his problems. Ronnie accepts, but soon things start to spiral out of control and Professor Verma begins to question his sanity.

== Cast ==
- Parvin Dabas as Jay Verma
- Omi Vaidya as Vikram Jaykar
- Pooja Batra as Dr. Shonali Roy
- Sneha Ramachander as Det. Shenoy
- Shanti Akkineni as Tanya Verma
- Mandi Sidhu as Alisa Mistry
- Dhruv Bali as Ronnie Bhanot

== Soundtrack ==
The soundtrack for the film was largely made by mother-son duo Kasturi Nath Singh and Vishal J. Singh. Additional songs were contributed by Derick Gomes, Superzero and Esfand.

#	Title	Lyrics	Music	Singer	Length
1	Chor Aur Police	Siddhant Kaushal	Kasturi Nath Singh, Vishal J. Singh	Vishal J. Singh	3:38
2	Dagha	Siddhant Kaushal	Kasturi Nath Singh, Vishal J. Singh	Prashant Vadhyar	3:47
3	Peecha Chorey Naa	Siddhant Kaushal	Kasturi Nath Singh, Vishal J. Singh	Shilpa Surroch	4:49
4	Jaahil	Vishal J. Singh	Vishal J. Singh	Sneha Khanwalkar	3:38
5	Jay's Theme	Kasturi Nath Singh, Vijit Sharma	Kasturi Nath Singh, Vishal J. Singh	Kasturi Nath Singh (feat. Parvin Dabas)	3:24
6	In My Way	Derick Gomes/ Superzero	Derick Gomes/ Superzero	Derick Gomes/ Superzero	3:32
7	Angel of Chances (Ronnie's Song)	Esfand	Esfand	Esfand	4:26

== Awards ==
This film has received the following awards:

Festival/ Awards	Location	Category	Year	Outcome
Asian One Awards	Mumbai, India	Best Actor	2017	Won (Parvin Dabas)
Delhi International Film Festival	Delhi, India	Best Actor	2016	Won (Parvin Dabas)
Delhi International Film Festival	Delhi India	Best Director	2016	Won
Golden Gate International Film Festival	San Francisco, USA	Best Feature	2016	Won
Newark International Film Festival	Newark, USA	Best Feature	2016	Nominated
Newark International Film Festival	Newark, USA	Best Actress	2016	Nominated (Pooja Batra)
Golden Gate International Film Festival	San Francisco, USA	Best Director	2016	Nominated
Golden Gate International Film FEstival	San Francisco, USA	Best Actor	2016	Nominated (Parvin Dabas)
Jersey City International Television and Film Festival	Jersey City, USA	Closing Night Feature	2016	-
Golden Door International Film Festival	Jersey City, USA	Official Selection	2016	-
Washington DC South Asian Film Festival	Washington, DC, USA	Official Selection	2016	-

== Critical reception ==
The film received mixed reviews. New Indian Express gave the film three stars and called it "an engaging, well-etched whodunit". Rohit Bhatnagar of The Deccan Chronicle described the film as "layered". Business Standard gave the film three stars. Film Companion said the film was "semi-competent". Asian Age reviewed the film positively, describing it as "engaging", as did IndiaGlitz.com.
