= Love, Lies and Seeta =

- Directed by: Chandra Pemmaraju
- Written by: Chandra Pemmaraju
- Produced by: Chandra Pemmaraju
- Starring: Melanie Kannokada; Arjun Gupta; Lavrenti Lopes; Michael Derek
- Cinematography: Lukasz Pruchnik
- Edited by: Kenneth Fabritius
- Music by: Dan Omelia; Robopop; Wired Beats
- Release dates: 19 February 2012 (IIFF, USA); 18 May 2012 (India)
- Running time: 100 minutes
- Country: United States
- Language: English

Love, Lies and Seeta is a 2012 Indian-American independent romantic comedy film written, produced, directed by Chandra Pemmaraju. Starring Melanie Kannokada, Arjun Gupta, Lavrenti Lopes, Michael Derek, it is built around three distinctly different guys all of whom pine for the same beautiful girl. The movie premiered at the India International Film Festival (IIFF) of Tampa Bay in Florida and went on to play in various international film festivals before having a limited theatrical release in India on May 18, 2012, by Cinemax. The film marks Melanie Kannokada's debut as lead in a feature film.

== Cast ==
- Melanie Kannokada as Seeta
- Arjun Gupta as Rahul
- Lavrenti Lopes as Bhavuk
- Michael Derek as Tom
- Ryan Vigilant as Tom Cruise
- Leah Kavita as Ramya
- Caroline Korale as Caroline
- Aaron Katter as Bud
- Daniel Wilkinson as Young John McKinsey, and
- Rob Byrnes as John McKinsey

== Production ==
The film was shot completely in Manhattan and Brooklyn in NYC with an ensemble Indian American cast. The movie was produced in micro-budget and shot on location using sync sound. The movie is first of its kind where it was funded and supported by film enthusiasts. By using crowd sourcing method the producers raised all the money for its production.

=== Music ===
The film features original music by various Independent musicians including Robopop, Timblane, New Life Crisis, Matt Hartke, La Dauphine and Wiredbeats.

== Release ==
On May 18, 2012, Cinemax Motion Pictures Pvt Ltd, India released the film theatrically on a limited basis in the Indian sub-continent. The film will be distributed by NYC based The Vladar Company in digital North American regions.

== Critical reception ==
The film received mixed reviews. Y. Sunita Chowdhary from The Hindu called it "a reasonably engaging watch". The Times of India gave the movie a rating of 1 out of 5 and said that, "Director of this Indie-film, Chandra Pemmaraju, set out to make a love story against the backdrop of an electrifying NYC, but ended up with a film which reminds you of a bad episode of an American sitcom". Blessy Chettiar of DNA India gave the film a rating of 1 out of 5 and said that, "Love Lies and Seeta could have been a commendable indie effort. The lack of a watertight screenplay and very casual treatment reduces it to one of those amateur film school projects." Bollywood Life criticized the acting as well as execution of the film and said that, "Actors are uncomfortable and lack energy, making the film boring".

== Accolades ==
Love Lies and Seeta was the closing night feature at the India International Film Festival (IIFF) of Tampa Bay in Florida in February 2012, and was opening night feature film in Art of Brooklyn International Film Festival in NY, August 2012. It played in various film festivals such as, NewFilmmakers Film Festival, New York; Riverside International Film Festival, CA; won the Award of Merit in Indie Fest, US; Won an Honorary Mention Award in Los Angeles New Wave Indie Fest and was a part of NFDC Film Bazaar at International Film Festival of India, Goa. The movie also played in Mumbai Film market and was nominated for the Best Film, Best Direction, Best Cinematography and Best Actor categories at the World Music & Independent Film Festival 2012, Washington D.C.
