= Chandra Pemmaraju =

Indian-American film writer and director

- Occupation: Filmmaker

Chandra Pemmaraju is an Indian-American film writer and director.

== Early life and career ==
Pemmaraju's interest in creative fields over the years has been expressed in the form of short plays that he wrote & directed while in India. A film enthusiast and strong desire to pursue movie making as a medium to create and express art has made him to take the plunge in 2008, switching from a financial services career in to filmmaking. Since then, he had made short films, and independent films that have been well received at various international film festivals in the United States and India.

He has written, produced, and directed May Beetle, Kissing Miss Jones and worked in the screenplay department, production management for Life! Camera Action.... He was also invited to curate a Bollywood Night in the New Filmmakers Festival in New York.

== Filmography ==
Year	Name	Producer	Director	Screenwriter	Other
2008	May Bettle	Yes	Yes	Yes	Short film
2009	Kissing Miss Jones	Yes	Yes	Yes	Short film
2012	Life! Camera Action...	No	No	No	Creative director
2012	Love Lies and Seeta	Yes	Yes	Yes	
2015	Selfie	No	Yes	Yes	(telefilm) a segment from the TV series Darr Sabko Lagta Hai / creative associate
2016	Midnight Delight	No	No	No	Assistant director / creative director
2017	A Gentleman	No	No	No	Creative associate
2020	Stay Safe, Baby!	Yes	Yes	Yes	Short film
2022	Gaalivaana	No	No	Yes	TV show
2026	Cheekatilo	No	No	Yes	

== Festivals & nominations ==
May Beetle (2008)

- Premiered at the New Film Makers Film Festival, Anthology Archives in New York City

Kissing Miss Jones (2009)

- Premiered at the New York Indian Film Festival 2009
- New Film Makers Film Festival, New York
- Indian International Film Festival of Tampa Bay 2010

Love Lies and Seeta (2012)

- Official Selection at the NFDC Film Bazaar, International Film Festival of India 2011, Goa India
- Closing Night Feature at the Indian International Film Festival of Tampa Bay 2012, Florida
- Official Selection at the Spring Film Festival 2012 – New filmmakers 2012, New York City
- Official Selection at the Riverside International Film Festival 2012, California
- Honorary Mention Award at the Los Angeles New Wave International Film Fest 2011, USA
- Official Selection at the Mumbai Film Mart, Mumbai Film Fest, India
- Official Selection at the Art of Brooklyn Film Fest 2012, USA
- Nominated for the Best Film, Best Direction, Best Actress & Actor in leading role at the World Music and Independent Film Festival, Washington DC 2012
- Award of Excellence for Best Feature & Best Direction at the Indie Fest
