= Melanie Chandra =

American actress

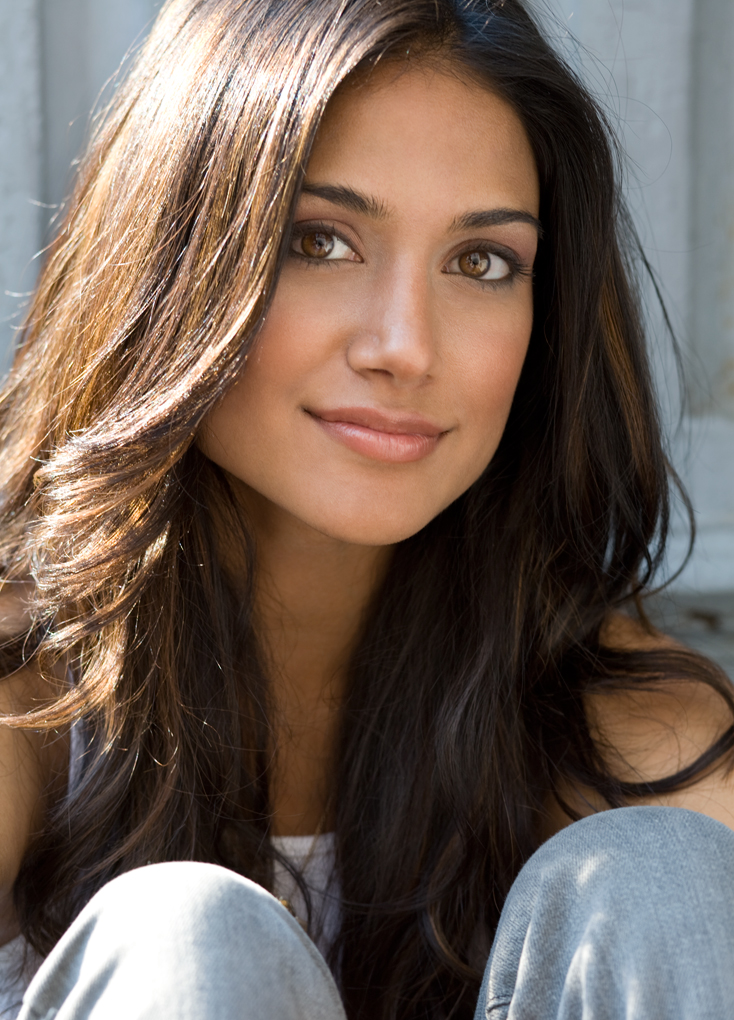
- Melanie Chandra
- Born: Melanie Kannokada; February 28, 1986 (age 40); Park Ridge, Illinois, U.S.
- Occupations: Model, actress
- Years active: 2008–present
- Spouse: Neeraj Chandra (m. 2015)
- Children: 2

Melanie Chandra (née Kannokada; born February 28, 1986) is an American actress, model, and co-founder of Hospital for Hope. She is best known for her roles as Malaya Pineda on the CBS medical drama Code Black and Mel in the Comedy Central television movie Hot Mess Holiday.

== Early life and education ==
Melanie Chandra was born Melanie Kannokada to Malayali Indian parents Suresh Kannokada and Sujatha in Park Ridge, Illinois.

After high school, Chandra earned a Mechanical Engineering degree from Stanford University. Upon graduation, Chandra initially began working at consulting firm McKinsey & Company, which she left to concentrate on her interest in modeling and acting. She stated that she found the management job "intellectually fascinating" but not something she wanted to do "getting up every morning".

== Career ==
After finishing college, Chandra entered and won the 2007 Miss India America contest. Chandra worked as a model and commercial actress in national and international campaigns for Nescafe, Verizon, Glamour Magazine, P&G, Crocs, Acura, Herbal Essences, LG, and Clinique. In fall 2011, she was selected as one of the five faces of Bare Escentuals international "Be A Force of Beauty" campaign. In fall 2012, she was selected to model in a five-page editorial spread for Vogue India Magazine.

Within a week of moving to Los Angeles to pursue an acting career, Chandra successfully auditioned for guest star role in the CBS hit sitcom Rules of Engagement opposite comedian David Spade. She starred in the CBS show Code Black and has guest starred in ABC Family's The Nine Lives of Chloe King, NBC's Parenthood and CBS's NCIS: Los Angeles. She also had a large recurring role on HBO's The Brink opposite Jack Black and Aasif Mandvi. In 2019, it was announced she will be developing a series called "Attachment" with HBO, alongside her co-creator and writer, Amy Aniobi, and Reese Witherspoon's Hello Sunshine. In 2019, Chandra stars in Surina & Mel, a show about two American-born South Asian women living in New York City figuring out adulthood. Chandra starred in the October 2021 comedy Distancing Socially. The film was shot at the height of the COVID-19 pandemic in 2020, using remote technologies and the iPhone 11.

In 2022, Chandra starred in the movie Lie Hard, a comedy about a pathological liar who borrows $4 million from a crime syndicate to purchase a mansion in order to impress his girlfriend's wealthy parents.

== Personal ==
Chandra is also a co-founder of Hospital for Hope, a non-profit providing healthcare services in rural India. She is also a trained pianist. Chandra is a 2nd degree black belt in Shotokan Karate and a two-time bronze medalist in the Pan American games, where she represented the United States in sparring as part of the United States Junior National Karate Team in São Paulo in 2000, Caracas in 2001, and Orlando in 2002.

== Filmography ==
=== Television ===
Year	Title	Role	Network	Notes
2011	Rules of Engagement	Simran	CBS	Guest star
2011	The Nine Lives of Chloe King	Nikki Amaral	ABC Family	Guest star
2012	Parenthood	Kirstin Mitai	NBC	Guest star
2013	Writer's Block	Vandana	MTV Desi	Series regular
2014	NCIS: Los Angeles	Ayesha	CBS	Guest star
2015–2017	Code Black	Malaya Pineda	CBS	Series regular
2015	The Brink	Fareeda	HBO	Recurring
2016	Nashville	Stephanie Leigh	ABC	Guest star
2016	Brown Nation	Roli	Netflix	Recurring
2017	Law & Order: Special Victims Unit	Lela Samra	NBC	Guest star
2024	Elsbeth	Morgan Lee	CBS	Guest star
2025	Grey's Anatomy	Shruti Kotwani	ABC	Guest star

=== Film ===
Year	Title	Role	Notes
2010	Bicycle Bride	Beena	
2012	Love Lies and Seeta	Seeta McKinsey	Leading Actress @ Indiefest 2012; Nominated – Best Actress @ World Music and Independent Film Festival
2013	D for Dopidi	Shalini	Debut Indian Telugu Film
2015	For Here or to Go?	Shveta	Indo-American film
2020	Draupadi Unleashed	Sita	Limited release
2021	Distancing Socially	Ella	
2021	Clifford the Big Red Dog	Susan	
2021	Hot Mess Holiday	Mel	TV movie
2022	Lie Hard	Katie Reynolds	
2023	Onyx the Fortuitous and the Talisman of Souls	Jesminder	
