= That Championship Season (disambiguation) =

That Championship Season is a 1972 play by Jason Miller.

That Championship Season may also refer to:

- That Championship Season (1982 film), a film adaptation directed by Jason Miller
- That Championship Season (1999 film), a TV film adapted by Jason Miller and directed by Paul Sorvino
