= Once Upon a Time in Queens =

- Theatrical release poster
- Directed by: David Rodriguez
- Written by: David Rodriguez
- Produced by: Kevin Kelly, Andrea Kelly, David Rodriguez
- Starring: Paul Sorvino; Michael Rapaport; Chazz Palminteri; Renee Props; Andrea Nittoli; Lev Gorn; Paul Ben-Victor; Steven Bauer; Hassan Johnson; Kevin Kelly; Johnny Williams; Olivia Panepinto
- Cinematography: John Barr
- Edited by: Frank Reynolds
- Music by: Geoff Zanelli
- Production companies: Grindstone Entertainment Group, Lions Gate Films Home Entertainment
- Distributed by: Grindstone Entertainment Group, Lions Gate Films Home Entertainment
- Release dates: June 2013 (Seattle); November 11, 2014
- Running time: 100 minutes
- Country: United States
- Language: English

Once Upon a Time in Queens is a 2013 American post-mob film written and directed by David Rodriguez, starring Paul Sorvino, Michael Rapaport and Chazz Palminteri.

== Plot ==
Joseph "Mr. Joe" Scoleri (Paul Sorvino) was a major Mafia mob boss back in the 1980s, somewhat like John Gotti. He is let out of a prison in Pennsylvania after serving 20 years, but is released conditionally, on probation, because of ill health. He moves back into his row house in his old neighborhood in Queens, where he was much loved and respected years ago. His daughter Rita Scoleri (Renee Props) is working but she shares the house with him.

He is immediately warned by his lawyer (Chazz Palminteri) that the terms of his release stipulate that he must have no contact of any kind with any Mafia members, or he goes back to jail. And his doctor explains to him that he is in very bad shape—he has severe cardiomyopathy, which will inevitably lead to heart failure at some point in the near future.

Mr. Joe discovers, mostly from hearsay, that the Mafia has changed a lot (it sounds to him as if it's deteriorated) since he went into jail, and so has the world in general, even in his old neighborhood. He is struck in particular how the young people show no respect any more.

However, Mr. Joe has a much younger next-door neighbor, Bobby DiBianco (Michael Rapaport), who is a hard-working family man who owns a deli. Bobby is kind enough to try to take care of what he sees as a nice elderly man; Bobby was too young in the 1980s to understand the crimes Mr. Joe was guilty of.

On the home front, Mr. Joe's 42-year-old daughter, Rita, explains to him that she is a lesbian—something that at first he finds completely repugnant.

Dominic Salerno Jr., (Lev Gorn), the thuggish son of a mobster who is no longer powerful, starts a confrontation in Bobby DiBianco's deli. During the scuffle, the thug punches Rita Scoleri in the face, sending her flying. The shocking confrontation causes an older neighbor, Carmine LaRocca, who is sitting in the deli and inadvertently shoved by Dominic, to die from a heart attack.

At Carmine's funeral, Mr. Joe speaks in Italian to an active mobster. It is not clear what is being planned, but they agree to something.

Mr. Joe has dinner with Rita and her girlfriend. They all get on really well, and he surprises them by asking when they will present him with a grandchild.

It turns out that Mr. Joe has set something up so that he himself can attack the young thug. As Mr. Joe approaches Dominic to talk with him, Dominic's bodyguards walk away, allowing Mr. Joe to kill Dominic with a claw hammer. After the deed is done, Mr. Joe immediately suffers heart failure, collapses and dies on the sidewalk.

Years pass, and we see Rita and her girlfriend at home with a baby, listening to a recording that Mr. Joe made back when he was still in prison.

== Cast ==
- Paul Sorvino as Mr. Joe
- Michael Rapaport as Bobby DiBianco
- Chazz Palminteri as Ben Rose
- Renee Props as Rita Scoleri
- Andrea Nittoli as Michelle DiBianco
- Lev Gorn as Dominic Salerno Jr.
- Steven Bauer as P.O. Ramirez
- Paul Ben-Victor as Vinnie Nero
- Hassan Johnson as FBI Agent Butler
- Kevin Kelly as FBI Agent O'Bannon
- Johnny "Roastbeef" Williams as Carmine LaRocca
- Olivia Panepinto as Olivia DiBianco
- Andrea Navedo as Anna Vasco
- Roberta Wallach as Angela LaRocca
- William DePaolo as Anthony Quick
- Michael Sorvino as Dr. Shapiro

== Awards ==
The film was an Official Selection of the 2013 Seattle International Film Festival, an Official Selection of the 2013 Austin Film Festival, and an Official Selection of the 2014 Florida Film Festival.
