= D. W. Brown =

American actor, instructor and producer (born 1961)

David Wayne "D. W." Brown (born June 30, 1961) is the co-owner and head instructor at the Joanne Baron/D.W. Brown Studio in Santa Monica, California. He has acted in, directed, produced and written films. He also has acted on television. In theater, he has worked as an actor and a director.

== Writer, Director, Actor ==
D.W. Brown first acted at the age of 15, in his hometown theater company in Tucson, Arizona, starring in "Desire Under The Elms". He moved to Los Angeles and first appeared as an actor on television as well as film in 1982, in The Facts of Life and Fast Times at Ridgemont High, respectively. He began to write and direct movies in 1996.

He worked with The Ensemble Studio Theater, developing plays for production and directing his own works as well as those of others. He directed "Fleas" and "Porno Stars At Home," which won awards for both of its leading ladies.

He has written and directed short films including "One Clean Move," starring Harry Hamlin and Gary Busey, which was honored at The Taos Film Festival and purchased by The Sundance Channel, and "The Need For Flowers" that received a "Best Actor" nomination at The Method Fest Film Festival. He co-produced and co-wrote the film "Perfume" (a Sundance Festival selection).

== Joanne Baron / D.W. Brown Acting Studio ==
Brown discovered a profound appreciation of the Meisner Technique after extensive training and subsequently became an instructor. He has trained actors, writers, and directors for the past 20 years at The Joanne Baron/DW Brown Studio, of which he is co-owner with his wife of nearly 20 years, Joanne Baron. His former students include Leslie Mann and Robin Wright.

== Filmography ==
- The Facts of Life episode: Jo's Cousin (1982) Bud Largo
- Fast Times at Ridgemont High (1982) Ron Johnson
- Weekend Pass (1984) Paul Fricker
- Mischief (1985) Kenny
- The Twilight Zone episode: Quarantine (1986) John
- One Clean Move (1996) Buck; director; writer
- Allie & Me (1997) co-executive producer
- Perfume (2001) Morton
- The Haunting in Connecticut (2009) Dr. Brooks
- On the Inside (originally titled In Northwood) (2011) Bearded Man; director; writer

== Publications ==
- "You Can Act – A Complete Guide for Actors" 2009.
