= Abigail Hawk =

American actress (born 1982)

- Born: Abigail Diane Gustafson; April 18, 1982 (age 44); Atlanta, Georgia, U.S.
- Education: University of Maryland, College Park
- Occupation: Actress
- Years active: 1995–present
- Spouse: Bryan Spies (m. 2009)
- Children: 2

Abigail Hawk (born Abigail Diane Gustafson; April 18, 1982) is an American actress known for playing Samantha Bonner in the 1995 television series Reality Check, Detective Abigail Baker in Blue Bloods (2010–2024), and Ellie in Almost Paris. For her performance in Almost Paris, Hawk won the Best Actress award at the 2017 Golden Door Film Festival.

== Early life ==
Born in Atlanta, Georgia, Hawk attended the North Springs Charter School of Arts and Sciences, in Sandy Springs, Georgia. While a student, she appeared in the TV series Reality Check. She received a bachelor of fine arts in theatre from the University of Maryland, College Park in 2004.

== Career ==
At first she found a number of small parts in productions including Law & Order: Special Victims Unit, and Across the Universe.

In 2010, Hawk began her long-running role on Blue Bloods. In that series, she plays Detective 1st Grade Abigail Baker, a member of the Police Commissioner's (Detective) Squad who serves as the primary aide to Police Commissioner Frank Reagan (Tom Selleck). Hawk's character was introduced in the first season of the series (although Detective Baker's name was shown as "Det. Melissa Baker" in the closing credits, it was changed to "Det. Abigail Baker" in subsequent episodes). Since that time, Hawk has appeared in all but a handful of episodes (over 200 through season 11), despite being billed as "Guest Star".

She also appeared in Body of Proof, season one, episode three titled "Talking Heads", in 2011.

In 2016, she played the main character, Riley Thomas, in the holiday TV movie A Christmas in Vermont. That same year, she played Ellie in Domenica Cameron-Scorsese's directorial debut Almost Paris, for which she won the "Best Actress" award at the 2017 Golden Door Film Festival.

In October 2017, Hawk was a guest of honor at the Spring Gala of HeartShare Human Services of New York, and received the Linda Dano Award.

== Personal life ==
Hawk is married to Bryan Spies, a paramedic for the Fire Department of New York City. As of 2024, the couple has two pre-teen sons.

Hawk publicly shared about how she struggled with postpartum depression after the birth of her younger son.

== Filmography ==
=== Film ===
Year	Title	Role	Director	Notes
2007	Across the Universe	Protester / Flower Child	Julie Taymor	Uncredited
2008	The Unidentified	Sara	Kevan Tucker	
2010	The Tragedy of Maria Macabre	Maria Macabre	Rachel Klein, Sean Gill	Short film
2016	Almost Paris	Ellie	Domenica Cameron-Scorsese	Winner, "Best Actress", 2017 Golden Door Film Festival
2018	Rich Boy, Rich Girl	Mia	Judy San Roman, Andrew Damon Henriques	
2019	Bubble Girl	Eva Young	Peter McGennis	
2020	Joy & Hope	Denise	Candice T. Cain	
2020	Brother's Keeper	Ashley Mitchell		
2020	The Wrong Path	Bonnie Lang	Andrew Damon Henriques	
2021	Assault on va-33	Mrs. Welch	Christopher Ray	
2021	The Wrong Path	Bonnie Lang		
2021	The Maltese Holiday	Kristen		
2022	The Only Woman in the World	Erin	Debra Markowitz	
2023	Daruma	Anna		
2024	Regarding Us	Constance	David Beck and Jennifer Bobbi	

=== Television ===
Year	Title	Role	Notes
1995	Reality Check	Samantha Bonner	14 episodes
2006	Law & Order: Special Victims Unit	Paramedic	Episode: "Informed"
2010–2024	Blue Bloods	Det. Abigail Baker	Recurring role
2011	Body of Proof	Jenny Avery	Episode: "Talking Heads"
2012	Are We There Yet?	Gina	Episode: "The Quarantine Episode"
2015	The Jim Gaffigan Show	Chloe	Episode: "Red Velvet If You Please"
2016	A Christmas in Vermont	Riley Thomas	TV movie
2018	Law & Order: Special Victims Unit	Maggie Householder	Episode: "The Undiscovered Country"
2023	My Wife's Hidden Lover	Phoebe	TV movie
2025	FBI	Caroline Eugene	Episode: "Devoted"

=== Other ===
Year	Title	Role	Notes
2020	Bromance	Melissa	Web series; 4 episodes
