= HeartShare Human Services of New York =

HeartShare Human Services of New York, originally founded in 1914 as the Catholic Guardian Society of the Archdiocese of New York (sometimes referred to as the Catholic Guardian Society of Brooklyn and Queens), is a nonprofit human-services and foster-care organization in New York City. As of 2019, it was the third-largest children's services provider in the city.

== History ==
The Catholic Guardian Society of the Archdiocese of New York was established on January 1, 1914, to assist teens transitioning from orphanages and institutions to life on their own, when neither the law nor society provided any protections. At its inception, it "had under its care 300 children", with activities all over Long Island, but focused on Brooklyn. The 1922 Catholic Encyclopedia described the organization as:

The Catholic Guardian Society of the Archdiocese of New York supervises the children discharged from the Catholic institutions for dependent children, and cooperates with similar societies in other parts of the United States. The children under its care are in two groups, those returned to relatives and those discharged directly to the Society. The service rendered the first group consists of visiting them in their homes at least twice a year for at least three years, following up their school and church attendance, their reception of the Sacraments, their work, and their general conduct. They are given the use of the Society's employment bureau and recreational activities.

In 1921, reportedly, "over 12,000 visits were made by the Society's agents, nearly 4,000 children visited the Society's offices, and over 2,000 boys and girls attended the Society's annual reunion". At that time, the president of the society was Archbishop Patrick Joseph Hayes. In 1978, the Society spearheaded an effort to find foster homes for all of the 300 minority children in New York City in need of foster homes. In 1983, the organization opened a new counseling and abuse prevention program in East Brooklyn, which was formally dedicat4ed in 1984. In 1985, former social worker Bill Guarinello was named CEO of the Catholic Guardian Society, and was additionally named president of the organization in 1993. In August 1992, the organization announced that effective September 1 of that year, it had changed its name to HeartShare Human Services of New York.

The organization has partnered with numerous celebrities, including Lauren Hutton, Linda Dano (for whom an annual award bestowed by the organization is named), Abigail Hawk, and Danny Aiello (who partnered with the group in the mid-1990s "to create the Frances Aiello Day Habilitation Program, a treatment center in Brooklyn". In September 2000, the organization withdrew its float from the New York City Columbus Day Parade after event organizers forbade the organization from having members of the cast of The Sopranos ride its float, due to negative stereotypes of Italian Americans portrayed on the show. The show's cast members did appear at a dinner in Spring Lake Heights, New Jersey, in support of the organization the following year.

HeartShare has been a party to several National Labor Relations Board cases involving alleged misconduct by the organization with respect to efforts by employees to form a labor union. In a case filed in 1995, and finally decided by the United States Court of Appeals for the Second Circuit in 1997, HeartShare was found liable for refusing to negotiate with a union formed at the Francis Aiello Day Treatment Center. The court also found that the individual center was an appropriate bargaining unit because its immediate supervision was separate from other centers, and employees had a lack of contact and interchange with employees of other centers.

== Programs and services ==
=== Developmental disabilities services ===
ArtShare for HeartShare is available to children and adults with intellectual and developmental disabilities, who create multimedia works, as well as jewelry making and design.

=== HeartShare St. Vincent's Services ===
HeartShare St. Vincent’s Services was established in 2014. The American Dream Program offers college tuition help, room, board, and other benefits, such as counseling and support, to young people in foster care. In January 2019, the program received a $20,000 donation from the Northfield Bank Foundation.

=== Awards ===
The organization periodically gives recognition to philanthropists "whose commitment to family and community transforms the landscape for underserved and marginalized populations."
