= Murdered Innocence =

1995 film by Frank Coraci

- VHS cover
- Directed by: Frank Coraci
- Screenplay by: Fred Carpenter; Frank Coraci; Steven Peros
- Story by: Norman Rafsol
- Produced by: Phyllis Alia; Fred Carpenter
- Cinematography: William Francesco; Rob Loscalzo
- Edited by: Tom Lewis; Suzanne Pillsbury
- Music by: Alan Pasqua
- Release date: 1995
- Running time: 80 minutes
- Country: United States
- Language: English

Murdered Innocence is a 1995 drama film directed and co-written by Frank Coraci, in his directorial debut.

== Plot ==
The film is a murder mystery about a young mother who is murdered.

== Cast ==
- Jason Miller as Detective Rollins
- Fred Carptener as Scott Baron
- Jacqueline Macario as Lauren
- Gary Aumiller as William "Teach" Spence
- Ellen Greene
- Victor Campos as The Warden

== Production ==
Steven Peros was a screenwriter. The film's music was by Alan Pasqua.

Murdered Innocence was filmed on Long Island. The budget for the film was $1 million.

== Reception ==
A review in Daily News described the film as "deserving of noir fans attention" and stated that "Coraci and crew's urgent exploration of the theme of shared guilt enables Murdered Innocence to overcome a sketchy script." The film was reviewed by Joe Hill in Filmdienst, a German-language film magazine. The film won the Long Island Film Festival.
