= Weekend Pass =

1984 American film

- Theatrical release poster
- Directed by: Lawrence Bassoff
- Screenplay by: Lawrence Bassoff
- Story by: Mark Tenser
- Produced by: Michael D. Castle; Marilyn Jacobs Tenser
- Starring: D. W. Brown; Peter Ellenstein; Patrick Houser; Chip McAllister; Pamela G. Kay; Hilary Shapiro
- Cinematography: Bryan England
- Edited by: Harry B. Miller III
- Music by: John Baer
- Production company: Marimark Productions
- Distributed by: Crown International Pictures
- Release date: February 3, 1984
- Running time: 92 minutes
- Country: United States
- Language: English
- Box office: $21,058,000

Weekend Pass is a 1984 U.S. comedy film written and directed by Lawrence Bassoff, based on a story by Mark Tenser.

== Premise ==
Four Navy recruits fresh from boot camp graduation in San Diego spend a weekend pass together out on the town in Los Angeles before shipping out for further training.

== Principal cast ==
- Patrick Houser as Webster Adams
- Chip McAllister as Bunker Hill
- D.W. Brown as Paul Fricker
- Peter Ellenstein as Lester Gidley
- Pamela Kay Davis as Tina Wells
- Hilary Shapiro as Cindy Hazard
- Annette Sinclair as Maxine
- Daureen Collodel as Heidi Henderson
- Phil Hartman as Joe Chicago
- Grand L. Bush as Bertram
- Henry G. Sanders as Officer Henry

== Production notes ==
Weekend Pass was shot on location in Los Angeles and Venice Beach, California.
