= Reality Check (American TV series) =

- Starring: Ryan Seacrest
- Country of origin: United States
- No. of episodes: 14

Production
- Production companies: S & S Productions

Original release
- Release: 1995

Promotional image

Reality Check was a 1995 television show starring Ryan Seacrest as Jack Craft, a 19-year-old inventor who gets stuck in his computer mainframe project on June 8, 1995. The two Bonner siblings (Samantha and Nicholas) reactivate the computer on September 17, 1995, attempting to get Jack Craft out of the mainframe, while also encountering additional members of the project.

The show was broadcast under syndication with each episode running for 15 minutes including commercials. It was produced in association with S & S Productions and ran for fourteen episodes before ending.

== Characters ==
- Abigail Gustafson - Samantha Bonner
- John Aaron Bennett - Nicholas Bonner
- Ryan Seacrest - Jack Craft
- Tom Greer - Will
- Maria Cabini - Isis
- Blake Heron - Bud McNeight
- Yasmine Seyfi - Yasmine Shanna
- Marsha Crenshaw - DEV the computer, and additional voices
- Mike Dyche - Glitch and voices

== Episodes ==
- "Note Of A Different Color" - Samantha composes an Earth Day song with the help of animated computer program Mr. Re.
- "The Great Escape"
- "The Ole Ballgame" - Nicholas learns about swinging strategies with the help of Jack and guest star Terry Pendleton.
- ? - This episode travelled through time for what had happened in the 1960s, 1970s (featuring Jack Craft), 1980s (featuring Isis), and 1990s.
