= Federico Castelluccio =

Italian-American actor (born 1964)

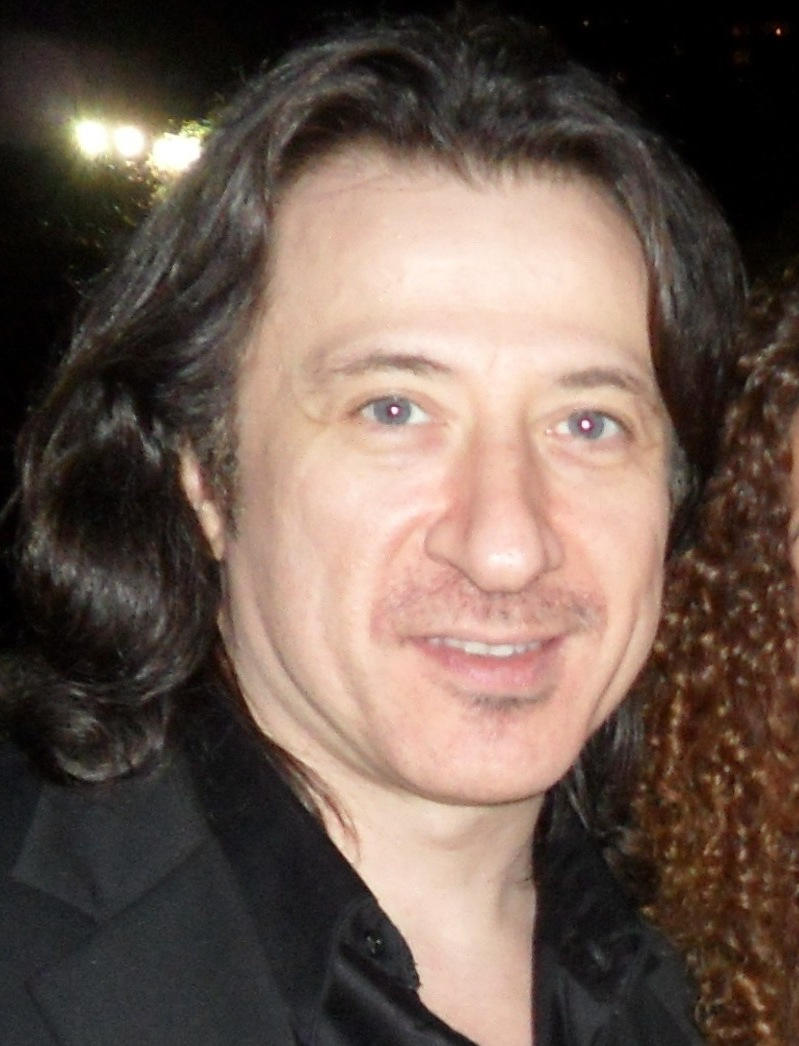
- Castelluccio in 2011
- Born: April 29, 1964 (age 62); Naples, Campania, Italy
- Education: School of Visual Arts (BFA)
- Occupation: Actor
- Years active: 1986–present

Federico Castelluccio (/fɛdəˈriːkoʊ kæstɛˈluːtʃoʊ/; Italian pronunciation: [fedeˈriːko kastelˈluttʃo]; born April 29, 1964) is an Italian-born American actor and painter. He is best known for his role as Furio Giunta on the HBO series The Sopranos.

== Early life ==
Born in Naples, Italy, Castelluccio moved with his family to Paterson, New Jersey, when he was three years old. In 1982, Castelluccio was awarded a full scholarship to the School of Visual Arts in New York City, where he earned a BFA in painting and media arts. Prior to winning the scholarship, he received an opportunity to create a painting for actor George Burns.

== Career ==
Castelluccio began his career as an actor in 1986. Some of his film credits include Made with Jon Favreau, Fire with Paul Campbell and 18 Shades of Dust with Danny Aiello. In television, his credits include NYPD Blue and his best known role, in the HBO hit series The Sopranos, as the Neapolitan enforcer Furio Giunta.

He also appeared in A Guide to Recognizing Your Saints which debuted in 2006 at the Sundance Film Festival and received two awards, one for best dramatic directing and another for best dramatic ensemble, headed by Robert Downey Jr., Chazz Palminteri, and Rosario Dawson.

Other film projects include the biographical El Cantante; Aftermath, a crime thriller; and The Obscure Brother, filmed in southern Italy, a short film that he executive produced and acted in; 2003's La Araña; the 2008 comedy Capers; Lucky Days; and the 2009 Forget Me Not. In television, Castelluccio played the lead role in Dragon Dynasty, a telefilm that aired on the Sci-Fi Channel. He also appeared in the episode of Kenny Vs. Spenny titled "Who Can Produce The Best Commercial".

In 2014, Castelluccio acted in Don Capria's short film Eulogy, acting alongside Michael Kaves. With the rest of the cast, they won Best Ensemble at the Queens World Film Festival.

In 2016, Castelluccio directed the feature film The Brooklyn Banker. In 2017, Castelluccio directed the TV pilot Outcall.

During the fourth season of Celebrity Apprentice, Castelluccio was asked by Donald Trump to judge which celebrity designed the best hat. Castelluccio eventually chose La Toya Jackson. She was awarded $25,000 for her charity, the AIDS Project Los Angeles.

== Painting discovery ==
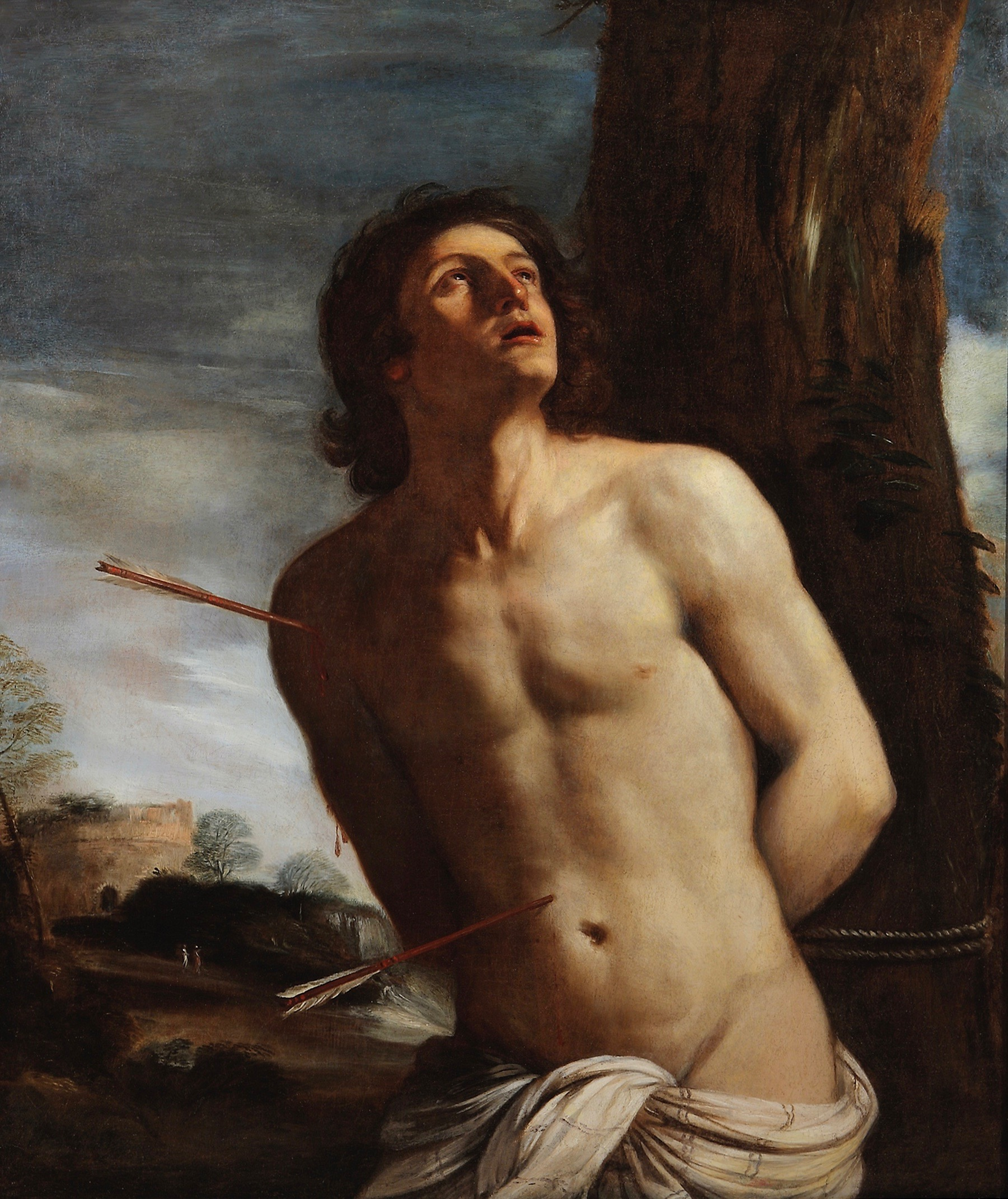
A painting by Guercino showing the Martyrdom of Saint Sebastian, which was discovered by Castelluccio

Castelluccio discovered a 17th-century painting by Italian baroque painter Guercino at a Frankfurt gallery and subsequently purchased it at auction in 2014 after it had been incorrectly identified as an 18th-century painting. He purchased the painting for approximately $68,000. After restoration, insurance, shipping, and other expenses, his total costs came to $140,000. The work's actual value was subsequently placed at approximately $10 million.

== Filmography ==
=== Film ===
Year	Title	Role	Notes
1997	Grind	Bar Patron	
1999	18 Shades of Dust	Bouncer #1	
2001	Made	Doorman	
2002	Fire	Jack	Video
2003	La Araña	Bobby	Short
2004	Return of Fire	Jack	Video
2004	Volare	Paolo Bongiovanni	Short
2005	In Hot Water	Father Sal Manella	Short
2006	A Guide to Recognizing Your Saints	Antonio's Father	
2006	Dragon Dynasty	Marco	TV movie
2006	El cantante	Jerry Massucci	
2007	The Obscure Brother	Father	Short
2007	The Hit	Sal	Short
2008	Lucky Days	Vincent	
2008	Proud Iza	Samuel Stein	Short
2008	The Bronx Balletomane	Joey	Short
2008	The Brooklyn Heist	R. Fadagucci	
2008	Speak Now or Forever Hold Your Peace	Louie the Bartender	
2009	The Pink Panther 2	Turin Guide	
2009	Forget Me Not	Samaratian	Short
2010	Bicycle Lessons	Himself (voice)	Short
2010	Lily of the Feast	Santo Bastucci	Short
2010	For Customers Only	Mr. Sierra	Short
2011	Keep Your Enemies Closer	Agent Lepari	Short
2011	The Decoy Bride	Marco	
2011	The Orphan Killer	Dr. Morris	
2012	The Trouble with Cali	Chassidic Bouncer	
2012	Pollination	Father	Short
2012	Brutal	Kastriot Morina	
2012	Delivering the Goods	Enzo	
2013	Stanley's Adventures	-	Short
2013	Aftermath	Darrell	
2013	Checkmate, Keep Your Enemies Closer	Agent Lepari	Short
2013	House of Shadows	Father Nicola de Mundo	
2014	Eulogy	Martin	Short
2015	Dutch Book	Mel	
2015	Leaves of the Tree	Dr. Ferramanti	
2015	Fall 4 You	Nicky	Short
2016	Outcall	Jerry	
2016	The Brooklyn Banker	Zucci	
2018	Toy Gun	Sante Cassoria	
2018	Sarah Q	Barry Homburg	
2019	Exit 0	Detective Mueller	
2020	5th Borough	Agent Miguel Alvarez	
2021	The War of the Worlds 2021	New Yorker	Short
2021	The Stakeout	Detective Mancini	Short
2023	The Families Feud	Rider of the Valkyries	
2024	Cabrini	Senator Bodio	

=== Television ===
Year	Title	Role	Notes
1991–96	Another World	Maltese Guard	Regular Cast
2000–02	The Sopranos	Furio Giunta	Recurring Cast: Season 2, Main Cast: Season 3-4
2003	NYPD Blue	Brian Vaughn	Episode: "It's to Die For"
2004	The Bronx Bunny Show	Himself	Episode: "Episode #1.9"
2008	Law & Order: Criminal Intent	Frank Chess	Episode: "Contract"
2009	Celebrity Ghost Stories	Himself	Episode: "Episode #1.3"
2011	The Apprentice	Himself/Guest Judge	Episode: "The Art of the Deal"

=== Music video ===
Year	Song	Artist
2006	"Rockstar"	Nickelback

== Accolades ==
- 2015 - Best Ensemble - shared with the rest of the cast of Eulogy - Queens World Film Festival
