= Joanne Baron =

American actress

- Occupation: Actress
- Years active: 1978–present
- Spouse: D.W. Brown (1985-present)

Joanne Baron is an American actress and Meisner technique acting coach. She was raised in Providence, Rhode Island and attended Classical and Pawtucket High Schools.

== Actress, producer ==
Baron's film acting credits include Valley Girl, National Lampoon's Joy of Sex, Real Genius, Introducing Dorothy Dandridge, Drag Me to Hell, Spider-Man 2, The Prince & Me, Allie & Me, Universal Soldier, Someone to Watch Over Me. Television appearances include roles on the Emmy award winning television show Mad Men, Law & Order, The Shield, Curb Your Enthusiasm, and the ABC series Lovers and Other Strangers. She acted as executive producer for the TV movie Profoundly Normal starring Kirstie Alley and as producer on the films Perfume, Brooklyn Babylon, and Allie & Me, for which she won Best Actress at the River Run Film Festival. Joanne also has extensive stage credits including There Once Was a Girl from Pawtucket staged in Los Angeles and which received two Dramalogue Awards in 1997.

== Meisner Technique master teacher ==
Baron is known for her dedication to the work of Sanford Meisner and is a teacher of the Meisner technique, having owned a studio specializing in that technique since 1975. She studied under William Esper, a prominent Meisner instructor and alumnus of the Neighborhood Playhouse, who founded the MFA and BFA Professional Actor Training Programs at Rutgers University. Her former students include actors Halle Berry, Robin Wright, Mariska Hargitay, Patrick Dempsey, Leslie Mann, as well as directors Martha Coolidge and Tom Shadyac.

== Joanne Baron / D.W. Brown Acting Studio ==
For nearly fifty years, Baron has been co-owner and artistic director of the Joanne Baron / DW Brown Studio in Santa Monica, California, (an offshoot of The William Esper Studio in New York) with her husband, actor, acting coach and director, D.W. Brown. Former students include Luca Bercovici, Ekin Tunçay Turan, Leslie Mann,

== Filmography ==
=== Film ===
Year	Title	Role	Notes
1978	Eyes of Laura Mars	Linda	
1981	C.O.D.	Rosalie	
1983	Valley Girl	Prom Host	
1984	Joy of Sex	Miss Post	
1985	Real Genius	Mrs. Taylor	
1987	Someone to Watch Over Me	Helen Greening	
1987	Medium Rare	Ruth	
1992	Eye of the Storm	Margaret	
1992	Universal Soldier	Brenda	
1994	Pet Shop	Marilyn Yeagher	
1996	The Dentist	Mrs. Saunders	
1996	Scene of the Crime	Marsha Levine	AKA, Ladykiller
1997	The Big Fall	Mrs. Brody	Video
1997	Allie & Me	Allie Dadadad	
1997	St. Patrick's Day	Priss	
2001	Brooklyn Babylon	Aunt Rose	
2001	Perfume	Janice Crawford	
2001	Burning Down the House	Brenda Goodman	
2001	Strings	Barbara	
2001	Hard Luck	Gretchen	
2001	The Theory of the Leisure Class	Barbara Beamer	
2001	The Myersons	Marilyn	
2003	Intoxicating	Dr. Eilene Preminger	
2004	The Prince & Me	Margueritte	
2004	Spider-Man 2	Skeptical Scientist	
2005	Horror High	Ms. Prudence	Video
2006	Kalamazoo?	Mrs. Goldman	
2006	Material Girls	Gretchen	
2006	School for Scoundrels	Lois	
2006	Coffee Date	Mrs. Orsini	
2006	Pittsburgh	Joanne	
2006	God's Waiting List	Beryl	
2007	Stand Up	Suzanne	
2007	Blur	Penelope	
2007	The Ungodly	Megan	
2007	Steam	Diane	
2008	Damage Done	Mrs. Park	
2008	The Flyboys	Ms. Poulson	
2008	Chinaman's Chance: America's Other Slaves	Elizabeth	
2008	Black Crescent Moon	Bitsy	
2008	iMurders	Christine Jensen	
2009	An American Girl: Chrissa Stands Strong	Mrs. Ziminsky	Video
2009	Everybody Dies	DEB	
2009	Heidi 4 Paws	Detie (voice)	
2010	Frankie & Alice	Susan Shaw	
2010	Bare Knuckles	Dorothy	
2011	On the Inside	Mrs. Standings	
2011	Life at the Resort	Nadya	
2011	Stan	Shelly Frankle	
2012	This is 40	Vice Principal Laviati	
2012	The Trouble with Cali	Zelda Hirschorn	
2012	3 Days of Normal	Liz	
2013	Decoding Annie Parker	Florence	
2013	Enemy Empire	Oracle	
2014	Murder of a Cat	Phyllis	
2014	Tribute	Sheila Spicer	Short
2015	I Remember You	Katie	
2015	The Sound of Magic	Maggie	
2016	Indignation	Mrs. Greenberg	
2016	Killer Assistant	Janet McAlper	
2016	Criticsized	Hilary Stone	
2017	Price for Freedom	Haleh	
2017	Man with Van	Hargrove	
2017	Deadly Exchange	Ruth	
2018	Frank & Ava	Hedda	
2018	Railroad to Hell: A Chinaman's Chance	Elizabeth	
2018	Kill Thy Neighbor	Katherine	
2019	The Creatress	Mrs. Freeman	
2020	Sno Babies	Sister Margaret	
2021	Tango Shalom	Hanna Meyer	
2021	Bart Bagalzby and the Garbage Genie	Maggie	
2022	Halloween Ends	Joan Cunningham	
2023	Critters, Carnivores and Creatures	Marilyn Yeagher	

=== Television ===
Year	Title	Role	Notes
1983	Lovers and Other Strangers	Brenda	Episode: "Pilot"
1985	The Twilight Zone	Mrs. Beacham	Episode: "Night of the Meek"
1986–1988	Sledge Hammer!	Mrs. Flambo, Wanda Hobbs	Episodes: "Under the Gun", "Death of a Few Salesmen", "Model Dearest"
1988	A Year in the Life	Margo	Episode: "Common Ground"
1988	First Impressions	Rhonda	Episode: "Pilot"
1989	Prime Target	Mrs. Weissman	TV film
1989	Chicken Soup	Mrs. Levine	Episode: "Community Service"
1992	Crazy in Love	Mona Tuckman	TV film
1992	Civil Wars	Mrs. Delvechio	Episode: "Grin and Bare It"
1993, 1995	Sisters	Edie, Stevye D'Lay	Episodes: "A Kick in the Caboose", "Word of Honor"
1998	Martial Law	Judith Jacobs	Episode: "How Sammo Got His Groove Back"
1999	Veronica's Closet	Brenda	Episodes: "Veronica's Desk Job", "Veronica's Night at the Theater", "Veronica Says Goodbye"
2000	Diagnosis: Murder	Rabbi Nussbaum	Episode: "All Dressed Up and Nowhere to Die"
2001	The Ponder Heart	Miss Teacake Magee	TV film
2001	Going to California	Barbara	Episode: "Hurricane Al: A Tale of Key Largo"
2003	Street Time	Beverly	Episode: "Hostage"
2004	Strong Medicine	Brenda	Episode: "Ears, Ho's & Threat"
2004	ER	Virgie	Episode: "NICU"
2007	While the Children Sleep	Mel Olson	TV film
2008	The Shield	Marianne	Episode: "Family Meeting"
2010	Law & Order	Danielle Payne	Episode: "Blackmail"
2010	Medium Rare	Ruth	Episode: "1.1"
2010	Law & Order: Criminal Intent	Hildy Glaser	Episode: "Three-in-One"
2011	L.A. Noire	Elinor Hopkin (voice)	Video game
2011	Curb Your Enthusiasm	Rabbi Stein	Episode: "Palestinian Chicken"
2012	The Unknown	Susan	Episode: "Yesterday"
2013–14, 2017, 2019	Law & Order: Special Victims Unit	Diane Schwartz	Episodes: "Military Justice", "Glasgowman's Wrath", "The Newsroom", "Brothel"
2014	Rake	Anne	Episode: "Cannibal"
2015	The Bar Mitzvah Club	Mrs. Goldstein	TV film
2016	Murder in the First	Ruth Adler	Episode: "Follow the Money"
2017	Grace and Frankie	Cheryl	Episode: "The Other Vibrator"
2017	Lady Dynamite	Barb Persecki	Episode: "Wet Raccoon"
2017	Romance at Reindeer Lodge	Val	TV film
2018	Bad Escorts	Mrs. Worthington	Episodes: "Training Day", "Revelations and Blindfolds", "Rendezvous"
2019	Total Eclipse	Ms. Reardon	Episodes: "Future Self", "Brownie Points", "One Turkey Sandwich", "Breakout", "Ditch Day", "Lights Out", "Millwood Casanova", "Sam's Jam", "Come with Me"
2019	Crashing	Shoshanna	Episode: "The Temple Gig"
2019	This Is Us	Gina	Episode: "Flip a Coin"
2022	Euphoria	Judy Daley	Episode: "Ruminations: Big and Little Bullys"
2022	Billions	Lorna MacGowan	Episode: "Lyin' Eyes"
2023	The Lincoln Lawyer	Margo Schafer	Episodes: "Discovery", "Suspicious Minds"
2023	The Morning Show	Brenda Litchfield	Episode: "The Overview Effect"
