= On the Inside (film) =

- Theatrical Poster
- Directed by: D.W. Brown
- Screenplay by: D.W. Brown
- Story by: D.W. Brown
- Produced by: George Elish; Michael D. Jones; Jamie Kennedy; Bart Rachmil; Michael Rachmil; Elsa Ramo; Mike Wittlin
- Starring: Nick Stahl; Dash Mihok; Olivia Wilde
- Cinematography: David A. Armstrong
- Edited by: Bart Rachmil
- Music by: Haim Mazar
- Release date: July 24, 2012
- Country: United States
- Language: English
- Budget: $4 million

On the Inside is a 2012 thriller film written and directed by D.W Brown. The film was released on DVD and Blu-Ray on July 24, 2012.

== Plot ==
Allen Meneric (Nick Stahl) is sent to a hospital for the criminally insane to be evaluated after he brutally murders his girlfriend’s alleged rapist. He very quickly becomes surrounded by evil psychopaths, people with seemingly mild personality disorders, sarcastic guards and indifferent doctors.

In a courtyard Allen has a chance meeting with Ben (Pruitt Taylor Vince). Ben's outgoing pleasant nature helps to initiate a friendship with Allen who is more inclined to keep to himself. Ben's state of mind, however, fluctuates and leads to endless droning, short-term memory loss, and occasional catatonic episodes as the film progresses.

Ben introduces Allen to Carl Tarses (Dash Mihok) who strikes fear into everyone he meets. He has deeply rooted emotional problems from parental abuse in his childhood. Terrorizing people gives Carl a sinister form of satisfaction. Things erupt between Carl and Allen after Carl describes some of his prior heinous acts to him.

Allen's good behavior gets him transferred to a minimum security section of the hospital where low risk males and females are able to interact. There he meets Mia (Olivia Wilde) who is both beautiful and bipolar. Mia and Allen instantly fall for each other and their budding romance causes them to smile and laugh for the first time. In a tragic twist of fate, Allen and Mia's private encounter, arranged by Mrs. Standings (Joanne Baron), a sincere and caring staff member, is violently interrupted by Tarses as he attempts to escape from the hospital.

== Production ==
All of the filming took place in Pittsburgh in the Prospect Street School in the city's Mt. Washington neighborhood. Originally titled “In Northwood,” the film was renamed as part of the producer’s effort to shift the focus away from the facility where Allen Meneric (Nick Stahl) was committed to the demons lurking in the minds of all of the characters in the story.

== Cast ==
- Nick Stahl as Allen Meneric. Allen is left emotionally disturbed and crippled by guilt following a traumatic childhood event. Flashbacks help the viewer develop an understanding of the depth of Allen's character.
- Dash Mihok as Carl Tarses. Carl is a psychopathic killer and a terrifying individual. His psychosis was most likely related to physical and sexual abuse from his father during pre-adolescence. He killed his father when he was 14.His twisted mind is revealed when he tells Allen of his crimes.
- Olivia Wilde as Mia Conlon. At first glance, Mia appears normal but she is extremely introverted and has a severe mood disorder. During a bipolar episode, she committed a crime that led to the deaths of an elderly couple.
- Pruitt Taylor Vince as Ben Marshall. Ben's pleasant nature is misleading. He can be violent and unpredictable as he vacillates between lucidity and schizophrenia.
- Shohreh Aghdashloo as Dr. Lofton. Dr. Lofton is an unethical psychiatrist on staff at Northwood. She is eager to use the patients to test experimental drugs but does not continue the successful treatments because of cost. She is also remiss in assuring basic safety and security precautions for the staff or patients.
- Tariq Trotter as Tom Bogotus. Tariq is the lead singer in the band, "The Roots," and is also known as "Black Thought." Tom Bogotus is one of the head guards in the hospital and arguably the sanest character in the story. Tom sees the good in Allen and tries to help him whenever possible.
- Daniel Franzese as Paul Warren
- Daniel London as Nathan Parks
- D.W. Brown as Bearded Man
- Joanne Baron as Mrs. Standings
- Haley Webb as Allen's Girlfriend
- Eric Jaeger as Young Man

== Reception ==
Thomas Spurlin of DVDTalk said of the film: "Brown's film lacks the convincing expressive tension and thematic point it needs around the story's shocking turns to justify its gritty psychological approach, one wanting to latch onto a statement about innocuous persons within institutions that doesn't materialize." Mike Gencarelli gave the film three out of five stars, saying: "It was a decent surprise overall."
