= Leaves of the Tree =

- Film poster
- Directed by: Ante Novakovic
- Screenplay by: Ante Novakovic; David Healey
- Based on: Kindness for the Damned by D.J. Healey
- Produced by: Joanna Lu; Donna McKenna; Perla Montemayor; Ante Novakovic; Kresh Novakovic
- Starring: Eric Roberts; Sean Young; Federico Castelluccio; Armand Assante
- Cinematography: John Schmidt
- Edited by: Ulysses Guidotti
- Music by: Randy Edelman
- Production company: Gogi Productions
- Release date: April 10, 2015 (WorldFest-Houston)
- Running time: 96 minutes
- Countries: United States; Italy
- Language: English

Leaves of the Tree is a 2015 Italian-American mystery drama film directed by Ante Novakovic and starring Eric Roberts, Sean Young, Federico Castelluccio and Armand Assante. It is based on the book Kindness for the Damned by D.J. Healey. It is also Novakovic's feature directorial debut.

== Cast ==
- Eric Roberts as Patrick
- Sean Young
- Federico Castelluccio as Dr. Ferramanti
- Kresh Novakovic
- Marisa Brown
- Armand Assante as Joe Buffa
- Sarah Sebastiana
