= The Brooklyn Banker =

- Directed by: Federico Castelluccio
- Written by: Michael Ricigliano Jr.
- Produced by: Craig Cohen; TJ Sansone
- Starring: Troy Garity; David Proval; Elizabeth Masucci; Paul Sorvino
- Cinematography: Ken Kelsch
- Edited by: Ray Hubley
- Music by: Tim Starnes
- Production companies: Classified Pictures; Pinstripe Entertainment; Jackson Leonard Productions
- Distributed by: TriCoast Entertainment
- Release date: August 5, 2016
- Running time: 95 minutes
- Country: United States
- Language: English

The Brooklyn Banker is a 2016 American action crime drama film written by Michael Ricigliano Jr., directed by Federico Castelluccio and starring Troy Garity, David Proval, Elizabeth Masucci and Paul Sorvino.

== Cast ==
- Troy Garity as Santo
- Paul Sorvino as Benny
- David Proval as Manny
- Elizabeth Masucci as Ann Bastucci
- John Bedford Lloyd as Agent Cahil
- Arthur J. Nascarella as Father Matteo

== Release ==
The film was released on August 5, 2016.

== Reception ==
The film has a 20% rating on Rotten Tomatoes based on five reviews. Kyle Smith of the New York Post awarded the film two and a half stars out of four.

Daniel M. Gold of The New York Times gave the film a negative review and wrote, "So much pedigree, so little payoff."

Craig D. Lindsey of The Village Voice also gave the film a negative review and wrote, "Unfortunately, this low-budget production comes up short in many places: limited performances, barely developed characters, a muddled script."
