= The Trouble with Cali =

- Directed by: Paul Sorvino
- Written by: Amanda Sorvino
- Produced by: Michael Sorvino
- Starring: Laurence Leboeuf; Paul Sorvino; Glynnis O'Connor; Joanne Baron; Frank Adonis; Raviv Ullman; Mira Sorvino; RZA
- Cinematography: Ruben Russ
- Edited by: Kimberly Generous White; David A. Davidson
- Release date: February 21, 2012 (Sedona Arizona Film Festival)
- Country: United States
- Language: English

The Trouble with Cali is an American drama film directed by Paul Sorvino and written by his daughter Amanda Sorvino. It stars Sorvino, Laurence Leboeuf, Glynnis O'Connor, Raviv Ullman, Peyton List, Federico Castelluccio, Melle Mel, Joanne Baron, Frank Adonis, Mira Sorvino, and RZA.

The film will not be released in theaters as a distribution deal was not able to be successfully negotiated spurring contention with Lackawanna County, Pennsylvania, residents as $500,000 in tax payer funds was used to finance the film. Subsequently, the Scranton Cultural Center hosted a free premiere of the film on July 9, 2015, with additional showings on July 10, 2015 and July 11, 2015.

== Cast ==
- Laurence Leboeuf as Cali Bluejones
- Paul Sorvino as Ivan Bluejones
- Glynnis O'Connor as Avie Bluejones
- Chris Meyer as Vail Bosenthall
- Joanne Baron as Zelda Hirschorn
- Frank Adonis as Uncle Vito
- Annie Golden as Mrs. Katie Saperstein
- Mira Sorvino as The Ballet Master
- Raviv Ullman as Lois
- Peyton List as Young Cali Bluejones
- RZA as Himself
- Bill Sorvino as Jimmy Lamberchin
- Michael Sorvino as Young Guido
- Federico Castelluccio as Hasidic Bouncer
- Melle Mel as Himself
