= That Championship Season (1982 film) =

1982 film by Jason Miller

- Theatrical release poster
- Directed by: Jason Miller
- Screenplay by: Jason Miller
- Based on: That Championship Season by Jason Miller
- Produced by: Menahem Golan; Yoram Globus
- Starring: Robert Mitchum; Martin Sheen; Bruce Dern; Paul Sorvino; Stacy Keach
- Cinematography: John Bailey
- Edited by: Richard Halsey
- Music by: Bill Conti
- Distributed by: The Cannon Group, Inc.
- Release date: December 9, 1982; (New York City premiere)
- Running time: 110 minutes
- Country: United States
- Language: English
- Box office: $40,000

That Championship Season is a 1982 American sports drama film based on the 1972 play of the same name. It stars Robert Mitchum, Martin Sheen, Bruce Dern, Stacy Keach and Paul Sorvino, the only cast member to have previously appeared in the play.

== Plot ==
It has been 25 years since the 1957 Fillmore High School basketball team won the Pennsylvania state championship. The coach and four of the victors regularly gather to relive the glory of their shining moment.

As teenage teammates they could read each other's moves on the court without fail. As middle-aged men, each is facing his own different mid-life crisis. With a former coach that still addresses problems as if his boys are having a bad game, the friends' longtime loyalty to one another begins to unravel.

George Sitkowski is mayor of Scranton and engaged in a fierce campaign for re-election. James Daley is an overwrought and underpaid school principal while his brother, Tom, has become a drifter with a serious drinking problem. Phil Romano is the wealthiest among them. He often bends the law and even betrays a friend to indulge his own needs, but George badly needs his support.

The intended celebratory nature of this reunion is quickly dissipated. Various contentions arise among the four old teammates, who quickly turn on one another. The coach's bigotry—then and now—and his selfish disregard for fair play are brought again to the surface. The absence of the team's star player, who hates the coach, serves to further spotlight the futility and hollowness of this gathering.

== Cast ==
- Robert Mitchum as Coach Daniel B. Delaney
- Martin Sheen as Tom Daley
- Stacy Keach as James Daley
- Bruce Dern as George Sitkowski
- Paul Sorvino as Phil Romano
- Arthur Franz as Macken

== Production ==
Jason Miller's play opened off-Broadway in 1972. After critical acclaim and 144 performances, it moved to a Broadway theater for a run of 844 more performances before closing on April 21, 1974.

Scenes from the film were shot in Taylor, Pennsylvania in the summer of 1982. Miller cited his upbringing and education in Scranton and said he was "only giving back to Scranton what it gave to me." Locations during the three weeks of Scranton shooting included Nay Aug Park and the then-vacant Erie-Lackawanna Railroad Station.

The score by composer Bill Conti was supplemented by the West Scranton High School Band. A limited-release 1200 copy soundtrack cd was released on the La-La Land Records label in 2009.

William Friedkin was originally going to direct the movie (he had worked with Jason Miller before on The Exorcist). Before he dropped out, Friedkin offered the part of Coach Delaney to William Holden. Holden was interested but died before he could accept the part.

The stars and director were paid $250,000 each plus a percentage of the profits. The film did a great deal to help the reputation of the fledgling Cannon Films, who financed it.

== Critical reception ==
As of September 2019, the film has a 71% rating on Rotten Tomatoes.

Los Angeles Times critic Sheila Benson observed similarities to the plot of the Robert Altman film Come Back to the Five and Dime, Jimmy Dean, Jimmy Dean, but said that while the Altman film "resonates deeply," Championship Season "doesn't even last until its over." She criticized Mitchum's performance as lacking power, and that the film was replete with racist dialogue without making it clear if the racism was embraced by the characters.

Writing in The New York Times, Vincent Canby called the cast "excellent" and said Mitchum's "laid-back, relaxed authority works very well for the coach, possibly because it hides for as long as possible the revelation that the coach is not only a sentimental bigot but an adolescent emotionally and as underhanded as any of his 'boys.'" But Canby criticized the upbeat ending as "unbelievable and, worse, attempts to balance - in a wishy-washy way - the terrible truths that have been so carefully laid out earlier."

New York Daily News critic Kay Gardella wrote that "Miller's vitriolic play loses much of its dramatic intensity on the screen." She praised the performances but said that Mitchum's performance "seems a little sluggish."

Gannett News Service said that the Scranton locations sometimes serve only to "disguise the fact that it is essentially a play, not a movie." Critic Bernard Drew said that Miller had broken up his acts, which had sustained audience attention as a play, "into a series of confrontations."

Diego Galán of El País wrote "Jason Miller makes his [film] with the wisdom of an orthodox narrator and a collaboration with five fine actors. Without them, the only dramatic situation in the film would be diminished".

== Awards ==
Bruce Dern won the Silver Bear for Best Actor at the 33rd Berlin International Film Festival.

However, the film was not a hit at the box office, and it lost money.

== Subsequent adaptation ==
In 1999, Sorvino directed an adaptation of the play for Showtime in which he played Mitchum's role as the coach. This version co-starred Vincent D'Onofrio, Gary Sinise, Tony Shalhoub and Terry Kinney.

== Home media ==
In 2004, the film was released on DVD by MGM Home Entertainment.

== See also ==
- List of basketball films
