= Paul Sorvino =

American actor (1939–2022)

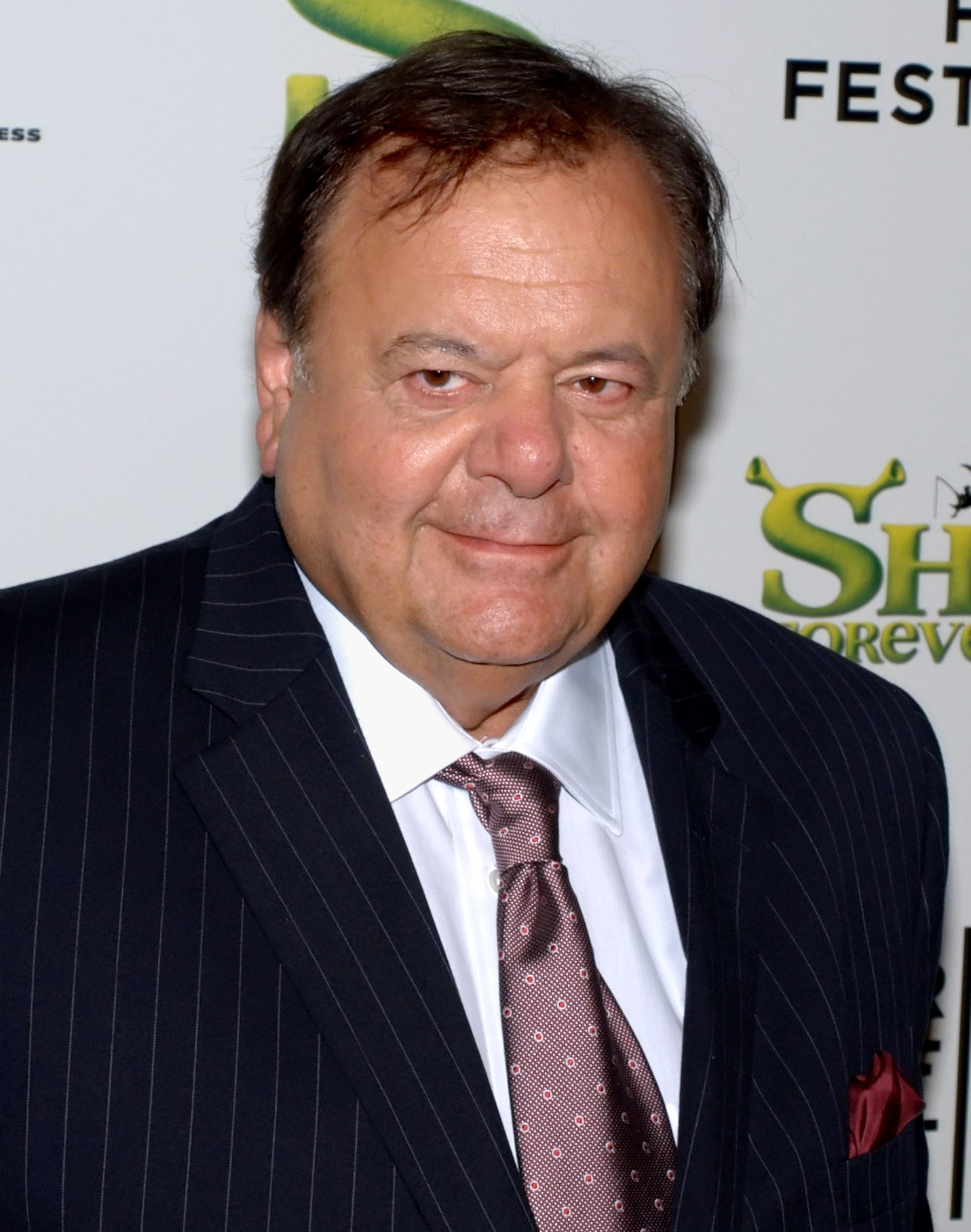
- Sorvino in 2010
- Born: Paul Anthony Sorvino; April 13, 1939; New York City, U.S.
- Died: July 25, 2022 (aged 83); Jacksonville, Florida, U.S.
- Resting place: Hollywood Forever Cemetery
- Occupation: Actor
- Years active: 1956–2022
- Spouses: Lorraine Davis (m. 1966; div. 1988) Vanessa Arico (m. 1991; div. 1996) Dee Dee Benkie (m. 2014)
- Children: 3, including Mira, Michael

Paul Anthony Sorvino (/sɔːrˈviːnoʊ/, Italian: [sorˈviːno]; April 13, 1939 – July 25, 2022) was an American actor. He often portrayed authority figures on both the criminal and the law enforcement sides of the law.

Sorvino was particularly known for his roles as Lucchese crime family caporegime Paulie Cicero (based on real life gangster Paul Vario) in Martin Scorsese's 1990 gangster film Goodfellas and as NYPD Sergeant Phil Cerreta on the TV series Law & Order. He also played a variety of father figures, including Juliet's father in Baz Luhrmann's 1996 film Romeo + Juliet, as well as guest appearances as the father of Bruce Willis' character on the TV series Moonlighting and the father of Jeff Garlin's character on The Goldbergs. He was in additional supporting roles in A Touch of Class (1973), Reds (1981, as Louis C. Fraina), The Rocketeer (1991), Nixon (1995, as Henry Kissinger), and The Cooler (2003).

Usually cast in dramatic supporting roles, he occasionally acted in lead roles in films including Bloodbrothers (1978), and also in comedic roles including his turn as a bombastic Southern evangelist in Carl Reiner's Oh, God! (1977). Sorvino was nominated for a Tony Award for Best Actor for the 1972 play That Championship Season; he later starred in the film and television adaptations, directing the latter. He was the father of actors Mira Sorvino and Michael Sorvino.

== Early life and education ==
Sorvino was born on April 13, 1939, and raised in the Bensonhurst section of Brooklyn. His mother, Angela Maria Mattea (née Renzi; 1906–1991), was a homemaker and piano teacher who was born in Connecticut to Italian (Molisan) parents from Casacalenda. His father, Fortunato “Ford” Sorvino (1902–1995), was an Italian (Neapolitan) immigrant who worked in a robe factory as a foreman.

Sorvino attended Lafayette High School (where he was a classmate of Peter Max, a painter and artist), graduated, and then went to the American Musical and Dramatic Academy.

== Career ==
Sorvino began his career as a copywriter in an advertising agency. He took voice lessons for 18 years. While attending The American Musical and Dramatic Academy, he decided to pursue a career in theatre. He made his Broadway debut in the 1964 musical Bajour, and six years later he appeared in his first film, Carl Reiner's Where's Poppa?, starring George Segal and Ruth Gordon. In 1971, he played a supporting role in Jerry Schatzberg's critically acclaimed The Panic in Needle Park, starring Al Pacino and Kitty Winn.

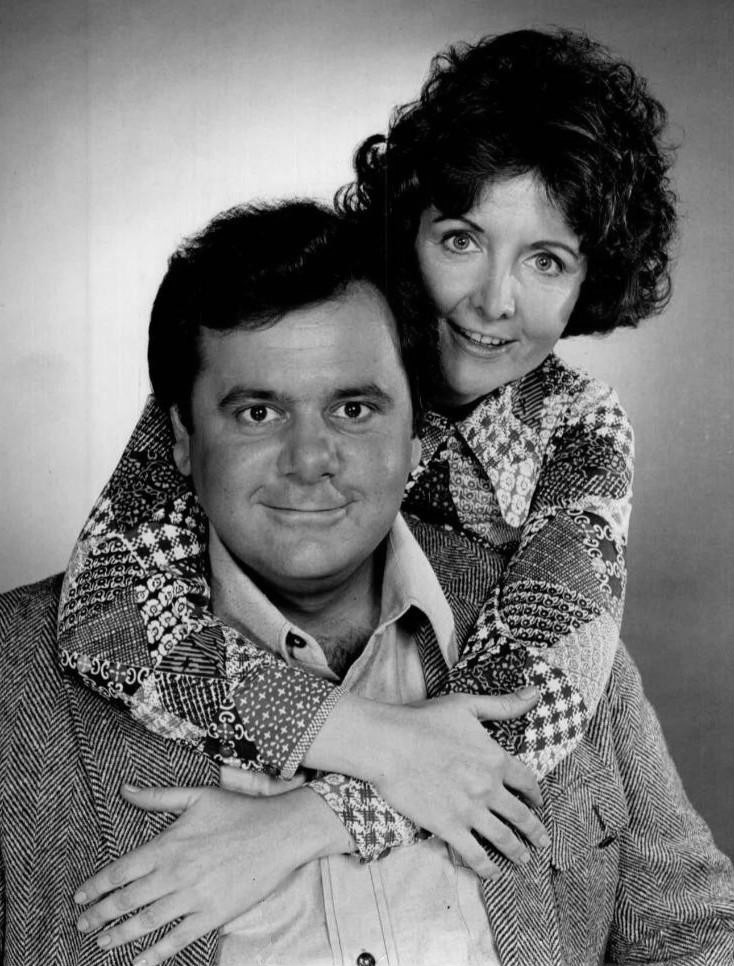
Sorvino with Mitzi Hoag in 1975

Sorvino received critical praise for his performance as Phil Romano in Jason Miller's 1972 Broadway play That Championship Season, a role he reprised in the 1982 film version. He acted in another George Segal-starring film with a prominent supporting role in the Academy Award-winning romantic comedy A Touch of Class (1973). In It Couldn't Happen to a Nicer Guy (1974), he played Harry Walters, a real estate salesman randomly picked up by a beautiful woman (JoAnna Cameron) and raped at gunpoint as a prank. He appeared in the 1976 Elliott Gould/Diane Keaton vehicle I Will, I Will... for Now. He starred in the weekly series We'll Get By (1975, as George Platt), Bert D'Angelo/Superstar (1976, in the title role), and The Oldest Rookie (1987, as Detective Ike Porter). He also directed Wheelbarrow Closers, a 1976 Broadway play by Louis La Russo II, which starred Danny Aiello.

In 1981, Sorvino played the role of Italian-American communist Louis C. Fraina in Warren Beatty's film Reds. He appeared in Larry Cohen's 1985 horror film The Stuff as a reclusive militia leader, alongside future Law & Order co-star Michael Moriarty. Sorvino also helped found the American Stage Company, a group that launched several successful Off-Broadway shows in 1986.

In 1991, Sorvino took on the role of Sergeant Phil Cerreta (replacing actor George Dzundza in a new role) on the popular series Law & Order. Sorvino was initially excited about the role but left after 29 episodes, citing the exhausting filming schedule, a need to broaden his horizons, and the desire to preserve his vocal cords for singing opera. Sorvino's exit from the series came in an episode in which Sgt. Cerreta is shot in the line of duty and transferred to an administrative position in another precinct. He was replaced by Jerry Orbach.

In 1993, Sorvino substituted for Raymond Burr in a Perry Mason TV movie, The Case of the Wicked Wives. He had earlier appeared as Bruce Willis' father in the weekly series Moonlighting and the "Lamont" counterpart in the never-aired original pilot for Sanford and Son. Some of his most notable film roles were caporegime Paul Cicero in Martin Scorsese's Goodfellas (1990) and Henry Kissinger in Oliver Stone's Nixon (1995). In addition to Goodfellas, Sorvino also played mob bosses Eddie Valentine in The Rocketeer and Tony Morolto in The Firm.

Sorvino founded the Paul Sorvino Asthma Foundation; he intended to build asthma centers for children and adults across the United States. In 1998, he narrated the series The Big House for The History Channel. In 1999, he directed and again starred in (albeit playing a different role) a TV version of That Championship Season.

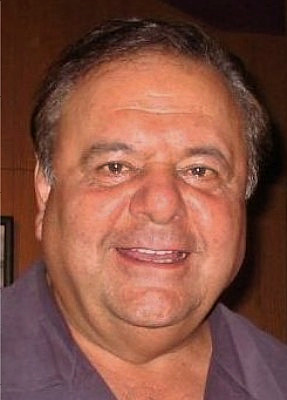
Sorvino in 2008

In Hey Arnold!: The Movie, Sorvino voiced the main antagonist, Mr. Scheck, the CEO of Future Tech Industries, who wants to convert Arnold's neighborhood into a huge shopping mall. From 2000 to 2002, Sorvino had a lead role as Frank DeLucca in the television drama That's Life. He also starred in the comedy Still Standing as Al Miller, father to Bill (Mark Addy). Sorvino filmed The Trouble with Cali in the Scranton/Wilkes-Barre area of Pennsylvania. He directed and starred in the film, and his daughter Mira also played a lead role.

Sorvino played GeneCo founder Rotti Largo in the 2008 musical film Repo! The Genetic Opera. Working with Repo! director Darren Lynn Bousman again, Sorvino played God in The Devil's Carnival, a short film screened on tour beginning in April 2012.

Sorvino's final motion picture The Ride was released posthumously in 2022. Sorvino appeared alongside Dean Cain, D.B. Sweeney, and his wife Dee Dee, in his final performance. Sorvino's scenes were filmed in Jacksonville, Florida.

== Personal life ==
Sorvino lived in Los Angeles and Madison, Indiana. He has three children: Mira, Michael, and Amanda from his first marriage with Lorraine Davis.

On January 17, 2007, news reports detailed that he pulled a gun in front of Daniel Snee, an ex-boyfriend of his daughter Amanda, after the man pounded on her hotel room door and made threats. Amanda testified that Snee threatened to kill her at a hotel on January 3 in Stowe, Vermont. She said she locked herself in the bathroom and called both the police and her father. Her 67-year-old father showed up before the police, she testified. When police arrived, the young man was arrested and charged with disorderly conduct, she said. As a deputy sheriff in Pennsylvania, Sorvino was legally authorized to carry a gun in different states. He did not point the gun at Snee or threaten him.

In March 2008, Sorvino and his daughter, Amanda, lobbied with Americans Against Horse Slaughter in Washington, D.C., for the U.S. Congress to pass the American Horse Slaughter Prevention Act (S311/HR503). The Sorvinos run a private horse rescue operation in Gilbert, Pennsylvania.

Sorvino was also an accomplished sculptor, specializing in cast bronze. In December 2008, his sculpture of the late playwright Jason Miller was unveiled in Scranton, Pennsylvania. In addition, he guest-starred on the 2008 album of Neapolitan singer Eddy Napoli, Napulitanata, performing a duet of the song "Luna Rossa".

In 2007, Sorvino launched Paul Sorvino Foods to market a range of pasta sauces. Based on his mother's recipe, the product appeared in supermarkets in the northeastern United States in late 2009. Three years later, Sorvino became part owner in Janson-Beckett Cosmeceuticals.

In an April 2014 interview, Sorvino said, "Most people think I'm either a gangster or a cop or something, but the reality is I'm a sculptor, a painter, a best-selling author, many, many things—a poet, an opera singer, but none of them is gangster, but, you know, obviously I sort of have a knack for playing these things. It's almost my later goal in life to disabuse people of the notion that I'm a slow-moving, heavy-lidded thug, and most people's impression of me is that—because of the success of Goodfellas and a few other things, but they forget that I was also Dr. Kissinger in Nixon, the deaf lawyer in Dummy, and they forget a lot of things that I've done. It would be nice to have my legacy more than that of just tough guy."

Before screening his film Once Upon a Time in Queens at the Florida Film Festival in Orlando in April 2014, Sorvino revealed that he practiced New Formalism, by writing rhymed and metrical verse after the heyday of Modernist poetry, and recited one of his own poems as an example.

In December 2014, Sorvino married political pundit Dee Dee Benkie after he met her while appearing as a guest on Your World With Neil Cavuto.

In January 2018, Sorvino found out that Harvey Weinstein allegedly sexually harassed his daughter Mira, and blacklisted her within the film industry after she rejected the film mogul's sexual demands. In response, Sorvino told TMZ, "He's going to go to jail. Oh yeah. That son of a bitch. Good for him if he goes, because if not, he has to meet me. And I will kill the motherfucker. Real simple. If I had known it, he would not be walking. He'd be in a wheelchair. This pig will get his comeuppance. The law will get him. He's going to go to jail and die in jail."

=== Death ===
Sorvino died of natural causes at Mayo Clinic Florida in Jacksonville Beach on July 25, 2022, aged 83. He was interred at Hollywood Forever Cemetery.

== Filmography ==
Key
†	Denotes films that have not yet been released

=== Film ===
Year	Title	Role	Notes	Ref(s)
1970	Where's Poppa?	Owner of 'Gus & Grace's Home'		
1971	The Panic in Needle Park	Samuels		
1971	Cry Uncle!	Coughing Cop		
1971	Made for Each Other	Gig's Father		
1972	Dealing: Or the Berkeley-to-Boston Forty-Brick Lost-Bag Blues	Taxi Driver		
1973	A Touch of Class	Walter Menkes		
1973	The Day of the Dolphin	Curtis Mahoney		
1974	The Gambler	"Hips"		
1975	Angel and Big Joe	Joe "Big Joe"		
1976	I Will, I Will... for Now	Lou Springer		
1977	Oh, God!	Reverend Willie Williams		
1978	Bloodbrothers	"Chubby" De Coco		
1978	Slow Dancing in the Big City	Lou Friedlander		
1978	The Brink's Job	"Jazz" Maffie		
1979	Lost and Found	Reilly		
1980	Cruising	Captain Edelsen		
1981	Reds	Louis Fraina		
1982	Melanie	Walter		
1982	I, the Jury	Detective Pat Chambers		
1982	That Championship Season	Phil Romano		
1983	Off the Wall	Warden Nicholas F. Castle		
1985	The Stuff	Colonel Malcolm Grommett Spears		
1985	Turk 182	Himself		
1986	A Fine Mess	Tony Pazzo		
1986	Vasectomy: A Delicate Matter	Gino		
1990	Dick Tracy	"Lips" Manlis		
1990	Goodfellas	Paul Cicero		
1991	The Rocketeer	Eddie Valentine		
1991	Age Isn't Everything	Max		
1993	The Firm	Tommie Morolto	Uncredited	
1995	Cover Me	J.J. Davis		
1995	Nixon	Henry Kissinger	Nominated – Screen Actors Guild Award for Outstanding Performance by a Cast in a Motion Picture	
1996	Love Is All There Is	Piero Malacici		
1996	Romeo + Juliet	Fulgencio Capulet		
1997	American Perfekt	Sheriff Frank Noonan		
1997	Men with Guns	Horace Burke		
1997	Money Talks	Guy Cipriani		
1997	Most Wanted	CIA Deputy Director Ken Rackmill		
1998	Bulworth	Graham Crockett		
1998	Knock Off	Harry Johanson		
2000	Longshot	Laszlo Pryce		
2000	The Amati Girls	Joe		
2001	Perfume	Lorenzo Mancini		
2001	See Spot Run	Sonny Talia		
2001	Witches to the North	Gallio		
2002	Ciao America	Antonio Primavera		
2002	Hey Arnold!: The Movie	Alphonse Perrier du von Scheck	Voice role	
2003	The Cooler	Buddy Stafford		
2003	Mambo Italiano	Gino Barberini		
2004	Mr. 3000	Gus Panas		
2006	Mr. Fix It	Wally		
2007	Greetings from the Shore	"Catch" Turner		
2008	Last Hour	Maitre Steinfeld	Direct to video	
2008	Carnera: The Walking Mountain	Ledudal		
2008	Repo! The Genetic Opera	Rotti Largo		
2009	The Wild Stallion	Nolan	Direct to video	
2011	Kill the Irishman	Tony 'Fat Tony' Salerno		
2012	The Trouble with Cali	Ivan		
2012	The Devil's Carnival	God		
2012	For the Love of Money	"Red"		
2012	Divorce Invitation	Daniel Miller		
2013	How Sweet It Is	Mike "Big Mike" Cicero		
2013	Once Upon a Time in Queens	Joe Scoleri		
2013	The Immigrant	Yeshiva Principal		
2015	Hybrids	The Count		
2015	Careful What You Wish For	Sheriff Jack "Big Jack"		
2015	No Deposit	Alfie		
2015	Sicilian Vampire	Jimmy Scambino		
2015	Cold Deck	"Chips"		
2016	Alleluia! The Devil's Carnival	God		
2016	Chasing Gold	Frank		
2016	The Brooklyn Banker	Benny		
2016	Detours	Joe DiMaria		
2016	The Bronx Bull	Giuseppe LaMotta		
2016	The Red Maple Leaf	Joseph Palermo		
2016	Rules Don't Apply	Vernon Scott		
2016	A Winter Rose	'Skippy'		
2017	Lost Cat Corona	Uncle Sam		
2017	Abe & Phil's Last Poker Game	Phil		
2017	Undercover Grandpa	Giovanni		
2017	Executor	Father Antonio		
2018	Acts of Desperation	Chief Lassiter		
2020	Most Guys Are Losers	Grandpa		
2021	The Birthday Cake	Uncle Carmine		
2022	The Ride	Paulie Amato		
2025	Pursued	Grandpa	Posthumous release	
TBA	My Jurassic Place †	Mr. McCormack	Posthumous release	

=== Television ===
Year	Title	Role	Notes	Ref(s)
1974	It Couldn't Happen to a Nicer Guy	Harry Walters	Television film	
1975	We'll Get By	George Platt	Main role	
1976	The Streets of San Francisco	Sergeant Bert D'Angelo	"Superstar"	
1976	Bert D'Angelo/Superstar	Sergeant Bert D'Angelo	Main role	
1977	Seventh Avenue	Dave Shaw	Miniseries	
1979	Dummy	Lowell Myers	Television film	
1983	Chiefs	Sheriff Skeeter Willis	Miniseries	
1985	Surviving: A Family in Crisis	Harvey	Television film	
1985	Wes Craven's Chiller	Reverend Penny	Television film	
1986	Moonlighting	David Addison Sr.	"The Son Also Rises"	
1987-1988	The Oldest Rookie	Detective Ike Porter	Main role	
1989	Murder, She Wrote	Al Sidell	"Three Strikes, You're Out"	
1991-1992	Law & Order	Sergeant Phil Cerreta	Main role	
1993	A Perry Mason Mystery: The Case of the Wicked Wives	Anthony Caruso	Television film	
1994	Star Trek: The Next Generation	Nikolai Rozhenko	"Homeward"	
1994	Parallel Lives	Ed Starling	Television film	
1994	Without Consent	Dr. Winslow	Television film	
1996	Escape Clause	Lieutenant Gil Farrand	Television film	
1997	Joe Torre: Curveballs Along the Way	Joe Torre	Television film	
1997	Duckman	Variecom CEO	Voice role Episode: "How to Suck in Business Without Really Trying"	
1998	Houdini	Blackburn	Television film	
1998	The Big House	Narrator	Main role	
1999	That Championship Season	Coach	Television film Also director	
2000	Cheaters	Constantine Kiamos	Television film	
2000	The Thin Blue Lie	Frank Rizzo	Television film	
2000 & 2002	That's Life	Frank DeLucca	Main role	
2004 & 2006	Still Standing	Al Miller	4 episodes	
2009	Doc West	Sheriff Roy Basehart	Television film	
2009	Santa Baby 2: Christmas Maybe	Santa Claus	Television film	
2012	Imaginary Friend	Jonathan	Television film	
2012	Jersey Shore Shark Attack	Mayor Palantine	Television film	
2014	Elementary	Robert Pardillo	"All in the Family"	
2014	The Goldbergs	Ben 'Pop-Pop' Goldberg	"The Most Handsome Boy on the Planet"	
2016	Grandfathered	Jack Martino	Episode: "Jimmy's 50th, Again"	
2017	Bad Blood	Nicolo Rizzuto	Main role	
2017	Criminal Minds: Beyond Borders	Dr. Dominico Scarpa	"II Mostro"	
2019-2021	Godfather of Harlem	Frank Costello	Main role	
