= Frank Coraci =

American film director and screenwriter

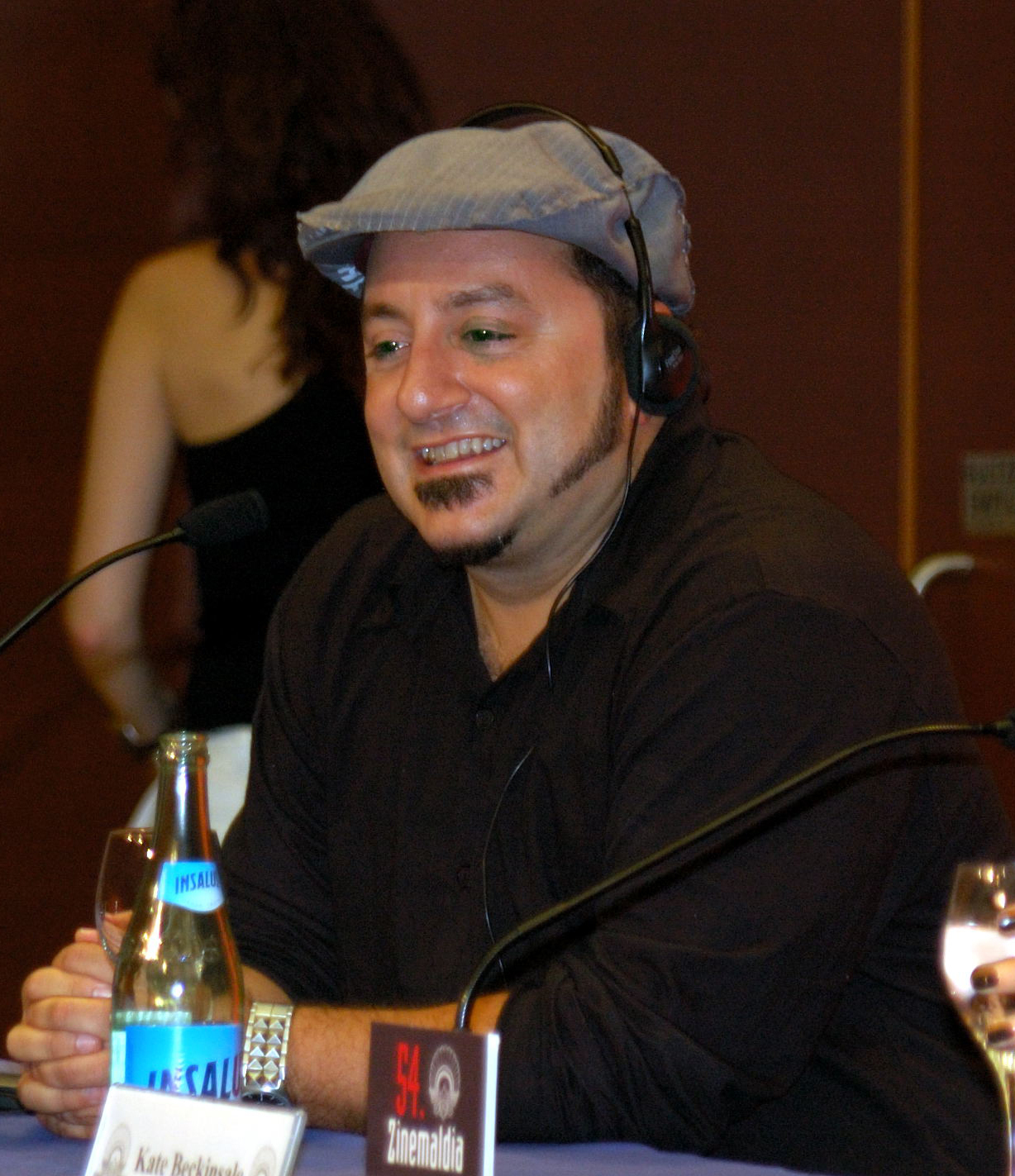
- Coraci at the San Sebastián International Film Festival in 2005
- Born: February 3, 1966 (age 60); Shirley, New York, U.S.
- Education: New York University (BFA)
- Occupations: Film director, screenwriter, actor
- Years active: 1995–present

Frank Coraci (born February 3, 1966) is an American film director, actor and screenwriter best known for his work with actor Adam Sandler.

== Biography ==
Coraci was born in Shirley, New York. In 1984, he graduated from William Floyd High School, where he was on the wrestling team for several years. In 1988, he graduated from New York University's Tisch School of the Arts with a Bachelor of Fine Arts in film. He has directed three successful films with Adam Sandler (The Wedding Singer, The Waterboy and Click) and several music videos for the actor. He worked as an actor in Sandler's video clip "The Lonesome Kicker," playing the character that gives the song its name.

He directed the movie Around the World in 80 Days, starring Jackie Chan, which turned out to be a box office flop, grossing only $24 million in the U.S. (made on a budget of $110 million).

Coraci also directed Zookeeper, a romantic comedy starring Kevin James and Rosario Dawson that was released in 2011.

== Filmography ==
Film

Key
†	Denotes films that have not yet been released

Year	Title	Work			Notes
Year	Title	Director	Producer	Writer	Notes
1995	Murdered Innocence	Yes	No	Yes	
1998	The Wedding Singer	Yes	No	No	
1998	The Waterboy	Yes	No	No	
2004	Around the World in 80 Days	Yes	No	No	
2006	Click	Yes	No	No	
2011	Zookeeper	Yes	No	No	
2012	Here Comes the Boom	Yes	No	No	
2014	Blended	Yes	No	No	
2015	The Ridiculous 6	Yes	No	No	
2019	Hot Air	Yes	Yes	No	
TBA	Lost Weekend †	Yes	Yes	No	Pre-production
TBA	Verona Spies †	Yes	Executive	No	Pre-production

Television

Year	Title	Notes
2007	I'm in Hell	TV movie
2016	Graves	Episode "Through a Glass Gravely"
2017	The 13th Jockey	TV mini series

Actor

Year	Title	Role	Notes
1996	Murdered Innocence	Wacko on bus	
1998	The Waterboy	Roberto	
2003	Last Man Running	Rick's Roommate	
2004	Around the World in 80 Days	Angry Dapper Pedestrian	
2006	Grandma's Boy	Cousin Steven	Uncredited
2006	Click	Male Nurse	
2012	Here Comes the Boom	Disoriented Gym Patron	
2017	Sandy Wexler	Mustachioed Referee	
2025	Happy Gilmore 2	1950’s Mobster	
