= That Championship Season (1999 film) =

- Genre: Drama
- Written by: Jason Miller
- Directed by: Paul Sorvino
- Starring: Vincent D'Onofrio; Terry Kinney; Tony Shalhoub; Gary Sinise; Paul Sorvino
- Theme music composer: Larry Blank
- Country of origin: United States
- Original language: English

Production
- Executive producer: Gary Sinise
- Producer: Steve Greener
- Cinematography: Bruce Surtees
- Editor: Leo Trombetta
- Running time: 130 minutes
- Production companies: MGM Television; Metro-Goldwyn-Mayer

Original release
- Release: June 6, 1999

That Championship Season is a 1999 American made-for-television drama film about the 20th reunion of four members of a championship high school basketball team and their coach. The film is based on Jason Miller's 1972 Pulitzer Prize-winning play of the same name, and is the second film adaptation of the play, after the 1982 feature film. The film was directed by Paul Sorvino, who also stars as the coach; he had earlier appeared, as one of the former players, in both the original stage production and the 1982 film.

In addition to Sorvino, That Championship Season stars Vincent D'Onofrio, Terry Kinney, Tony Shalhoub and Gary Sinise, who portray the four former players. The screenplay was by Miller, who had also written the screenplay for the 1982 film.

== Plot ==
Phil, James, George, and Tom meet 20 years after their championship high school game at a special reunion at their high school. Afterwards, they decide to visit the home of their old coach. While at first it seems they are all having a few harmless drinks, the night soon takes a violent turn as several things are realized; Phil is having an affair with George's wife, George (who is running for mayor) is firing James, who is his campaign chairman, and Tom has become a reeling drunk.

With the help of their old Coach, the men try to put their lives back together—but the Coach proves to be nothing they believed him to have been, and worse than no help; in fact, his involvement with each of the men's lives proves to have done them all much more harm than good. This is particularly glaring because of the refusal of the star player, who still hates the Coach after all these years, to attend the reunion.

== Featured cast ==
Actor	Role
Vincent D'Onofrio	Phil Romano
Terry Kinney	James Daly
Carol Lawrence	Claire's Mother
Jerri Manthey	Claire (as Jerri Lynn London)
Tony Shalhoub	George Sitkowski
Gary Sinise	Tom Daley
Paul Sorvino	Coach

== See also ==
- List of basketball films
