= The Ride (2022 film) =

Film directed by Adam Marino

- Directed by: Adam Marino
- Screenplay by: Adam Ninyo; Patrick Moore
- Story by: Joe Costa; Denise Carey-Costa
- Produced by: Jessica Roszko
- Starring: Savanah Joeckel; Mark Justice; Paul Sorvino; Dee Dee Sorvino; D. B. Sweeney; Dean Cain
- Cinematography: Adam Marino
- Edited by: Adam Marino
- Music by: Matthew Cravener
- Production companies: 2 Tree Films; Spotlight Feature Films
- Release date: January 15, 2022 (Southeast Regional Film Festival)
- Running time: 90 minutes
- Country: United States
- Language: English

The Ride is a 2022 American thriller drama directed by Adam Marino and starring Savanah Joeckel, Mark Justice, Paul Sorvino (in his final screen appearance before his death), Dee Dee Sorvino, D. B. Sweeney and Dean Cain.

== Cast ==
- Savanah Joeckel as Angela Jones
- Mark Justice as Laz Jones
- Paul Sorvino as Paulie Amato
- Dee Dee Sorvino as Dee Amato
- D. B. Sweeney as Gas Station Owner
- Dean Cain as Mark Smith

== Production ==
The film was shot in Jacksonville, Florida.

== Release ==
The Ride premiered at the Southeast Regional Film Festival in Jacksonville on January 15, 2022. It was released in Beverly Hills on October 19, 2022.
