= Michael Sorvino =

American actor and producer (born 1977)

- Born: Michael Davis Sorvino; November 21, 1977 (age 48); Tenafly, New Jersey, U.S.
- Other names: Mike Sorvino
- Education: Rutgers University
- Occupations: Actor; producer
- Years active: 1993–present
- Father: Paul Sorvino
- Relatives: Mira Sorvino (sister), Amanda (sister)

Michael Davis Sorvino (born November 21, 1977) is an American actor and producer. He is best known as the voice of Tommy Angelo, the protagonist in the action-adventure game Mafia (2002). His work also includes roles in the films Summer of Sam (1999), The Trouble with Cali (2012) Once Upon a Time in Queens (2013), and Almost Paris (2016), among others. He is the son of actor Paul Sorvino and Lorraine Ruth Davis and the brother of actress Mira Sorvino.

== Career ==
Michael Davis Sorvino was born on November 21, 1977 in Tenafly, New Jersey to actor Paul Sorvino and graduated from Tenafly High School in 1996. He went on to graduate from Rutgers University's Mason Gross School of the Arts in New Brunswick, New Jersey with a Bachelor of Fine Arts Degree in Theater (Acting) in May 2001. Sorvino first started acting in 1993 with a part in the film Amongst Friends. He had a recurring role in 2005 on the television mini-series Human Trafficking. He also voiced the lead character Thomas "Tommy" Angelo in the action-adventure game Mafia (2002).

Sorvino also produced and acted in the 2016 comedy drama film Almost Paris, which was directed by Domenica Cameron-Scorsese.

He is currently in development on the feature film Big Enzo's Wedding, which he is producing and acting in as well.

== Filmography ==
=== Film ===
Year	Title	Role	Notes
1993	Amongst Friends	Kid in Fight	
1995	Sweet Nothing	Waiting Customer	
1999	Summer of Sam	Bowler at Diner	
2001	Perfume	Mario Mancini	
2003	Gods and Generals	Federal Soldier	
2007	Blind Luck	David	(Short)
2007	Blur	James	
2010	Mineville	Robert Laremy	
2010	In the End	Michael Bennett	(Video short)
2011	Hunting Season	David	
2012	The Trouble with Cali	Young Guido	
2013	How Sweet It Is	Butler	
2013	Once Upon a Time in Queens	Dr. Shapiro	
2016	Chasing Gold	Jeff Wagner	
2016	Almost Paris	Mikey-Mike	
2017	The Depths	Jimmy / Noir Film Narrator	

=== Television ===
Year	Title	Role	Notes
2005	Human Trafficking	Mischa	5 episodes
2010	Hillers	Tommy	Unknown episodes
2016	You Are Nothing	Ellen's Husband	Unknown episodes

=== Video games ===
Year	Title	Voice role	Notes
2002	Mafia	Tommy Angelo	
2010	Mafia II	Tommy Angelo	Archival audio
