= Almost Paris =

- Film poster
- Directed by: Domenica Cameron-Scorsese
- Written by: Wally Marzano-Lesnevich
- Produced by: Wally Marzano-Lesnevich; Michael Sorvino
- Starring: Wally Marzano-Lesnevich; Michael Sorvino; Abigail Hawk
- Distributed by: Freestyle Digital Media
- Release date: April 24, 2016 (Tribeca)
- Country: United States
- Language: English

Almost Paris is a 2016 American comedy-drama film directed by Domenica Cameron-Scorsese and starring Wally Marzano-Lesnevich, Michael Sorvino and Abigail Hawk. It is Cameron-Scorsese's feature directorial debut.

== Plot ==
Set after the 2008 mortgage crisis, the film follows Max, a former banker who returns to his hometown after losing his job. His past actions in the financial sector have contributed to the economic difficulties of people in his community. As he attempts to rebuild his life, Max takes a position at a local bank, where he faces ethical challenges while dealing with clients in financial distress. His return also brings him into conflict with family members and former acquaintances affected by his earlier decisions. Over time, Max seeks to repair these relationships and reassess his role within the community.

== Cast ==
- Wally Marzano-Lesnevich
- Susan Varon
- Joanna P. Adler
- Ryan McCarthy
- Adam LeFevre
- Abigail Hawk
- Adrian Martinez
- Michael Sorvino

== Release ==
The film premiered at the Tribeca Film Festival on April 24, 2016. Freestyle Digital Media acquired North American distribution rights to the film in November 2017. The film was released in theaters and on digital platforms on January 9, 2018.

== Reception ==
Alan Ng of Film Threat awarded the film two stars out of five.
