= Perfume (2001 film) =

2001 film about the fashion industry directed by Michael Rymer

- Teaser poster
- Directed by: Michael Rymer; Hunter Carson
- Written by: Michael Rymer; L. M. Kit Carson
- Produced by: L. M. Kit Carson; Cynthia Hargrave; Nadia Leonelli; Fredrik Sundwall
- Starring: Paul Sorvino; Leslie Mann; Jeff Goldblum; Rita Wilson; Jared Harris; Joanne Baron; Michelle Williams; Mariel Hemingway
- Cinematography: Rex Nicholson
- Edited by: Dany Cooper
- Music by: Adam Plack
- Distributed by: Lionsgate (Select territories); Minerva Pictures (Italy)
- Release date: January 26, 2001 (Sundance)
- Running time: 106 minutes
- Country: United States
- Language: English

Perfume is a 2001 American film directed by Michael Rymer, and featuring an ensemble cast, starring Paul Sorvino, Leslie Mann, Jeff Goldblum, Mariel Hemingway, Rita Wilson, Jared Harris, Joanne Baron and Michelle Williams. All dialogue was improvised by the actors. The film premiered at the 2001 Sundance Film Festival.

== Plot ==
A week prior to a New York Fashion Week, various models, photographers, agents, reporters, publicists and designers, involved in the fashion industry, find themselves embroiled in conflicts.

Anthony is a fashion photographer who has to reinvent himself after his signature heroin chic style has become overused and obvious. Janice Crawford, powerful chief editor of A Magazine, offers Anthony the chance to prove himself with a cover shot. In the meantime, Janice's estranged daughter Halley resurfaces unexpectedly.

Camille is an up-and-coming fashion designer who's leaving the small atelier owned by Roberta Colaredo to join the large fashion house Fantasia, for which her current lover, Jamie, works as a talent scout. When Camille takes a deal, Roberta finds her atelier is set back.

Lorenzo Mancini is a famous Italian fashion designer who learns that he's dying of cancer, but keeps the news from his former wife Irene and his boyfriend Guido while also trying to prevent his son Mario from changing their family business into a new line that panders to hip hop culture. Lorenzo meets with some hip hop artists who help open his mind to Mario's idea to cater to new clientele. Guido contacts Irene who tells their son and daughter about the cancer diagnosis, so they are able to say goodbye.

== Cast ==
- Jared Harris as Anthony, a fashion photographer
- Michelle Forbes as Francene, Anthony's live-in girlfriend
- D.W. Brown as Morton, Anthony's assistant
- Estella Warren as Arrianne, a model who refuses to do a nude shot with Anthony
- Sonja Sohn as Dandy, Arrianne's agent
- Mariel Hemingway as Leese Hotton, a famous actress Anthony is hired to shoot for the cover of A Magazine
- Joanne Baron as Janice Crawford
- Angela Bettis as Wilemina, Janice Crawford's assistant
- Mariska Hargitay as Darcy, an editor at A Magazine
- Michelle Williams as Halley Crawford, Janice Crawford's estranged daughter
- Leslie Mann as Camille, a talented designer working for Roberta Colaredo's atelier
- Hunter Carson as Paul McMichaels, Camille's friend
- Jeff Goldblum as Jamie, a talent scout for the Fantasia firm and Camille's recent hook-up
- Harris Yulin as Phillip Brosco, a high-ranking manager at Fantasia
- Rita Wilson as Roberta Colaredo
- Morena Baccarin as Monica, Roberta Colaredo's assistant
- Troy Garity as Simon, Roberta Colaredo's staffer
- Lucy Gordon as Sarah, Roberta Colaredo's staffer
- Steven Chester Prince as Dennis, Roberta Colaredo's business manager
- Carmen Ejogo as Chloe, Roberta Colaredo's English designer
- Amber Valletta as Blair, Roberta Colaredo's shoe designer
- Harry Hamlin as Hancock, Roberta Colaredo's boyfriend
- Michelle Monaghan as Penny, Roberta Colaredo's model who decides to leave her atelier
- Paul Sorvino as Lorenzo Mancini
- Peter Gallagher as Guido, Lorenzo Mancini's live-in boyfriend
- Sônia Braga as Irene Mancini, Lorenzo Mancini's ex-wife
- Gaby Hoffmann as Gabriella Mancini, Lorenzo Mancini's daughter
- Michael Sorvino as Mario Mancini, Lorenzo Mancini's son
- Carmen Electra as Simone, Mario's girlfriend
- Robert Joy as Andrew, Lorenzo Mancini's butler
- Kyle MacLachlan as the business manager pitching Lorenzo Mancini the extravagant "music underwear" idea
- Omar Epps as J.B., a famous rapper who tries to launch his own fashion line through Lorenzo
- Coolio as T, an associate of J.B.
- Nabila Khashoggi as Kelley
- Lee Tergesen as a lawyer

== Production ==
The film was shot in 20 days in New York. All actors were required to improvise their own dialogue based on a detailed outline by Michael Rymer and L.M. Kit Carson.

Jeff Goldblum served as an executive producer.

== Reception ==
Todd McCarthy of Variety wrote, "Another attempt to nail the fashion industry, Perfume is more coherent and serious-minded than Robert Altman's mess Ready to Wear, but remains a less alluring creation." McCarthy noted the characters felt thinly developed and lamented how the film’s "lack of interest in exposition, basic information about the relationships of many of the characters — whom they work for and why they’re behaving the way they are — remains vague for a considerable time." Buzz McClain of AllMovie was more critical, writing, "In the end, you learn nothing about the fashion industry, you glean no insight into the characters, and you feel as if you've watched an acting class of self-conscious performers. If anything, Perfume only serves to point out how good Altman is."

On the review aggregator website Rotten Tomatoes, 11% of 9 critics' reviews are positive.

== Accolades ==
Independent Spirit Awards

- Nominated—Producers Award: Nadia Leonelli
