= Frank Adonis =

American actor (1935–2018)

- Adonis in Raging Bull, 1980
- Born: Frank Testaverde Scioscia; October 27, 1935; Brooklyn, New York, U.S.
- Died: December 26, 2018 (aged 83); Las Vegas, Nevada, U.S.
- Occupation: Actor
- Years active: 1971–2017
- Spouse: Denise Adonis
- Children: 3

Frank Testaverde Scioscia (October 27, 1935 – December 26, 2018) was an American actor. He was perhaps best known for playing the mobster Anthony Stabile in the 1990 film Goodfellas.

== Life and career ==
Adonis was born in Brooklyn, New York. His first film role was in 1971 in The French Connection, where he played the uncredited role of a bidder at a car auction in New York. During the 1970s Adonis appeared in films such as Shaft's Big Score!, Cops and Robbers, Lucky Luciano, Crazy Joe, The Gambler and The Gang That Couldn't Shoot Straight. In 1978, he co-starred in the film Eyes of Laura Mars, in which he played the role of Detective Sal Volpe.

In 1980 Adonis co-starred in the film Raging Bull, where he played the role of Patsy. He appeared in further films including Goodfellas, Spike of Bensonhurst, Wolfen, King of New York, Ace Ventura: Pet Detective, Find Me Guilty, The Trouble with Cali, True Romance, Casino, Ghost Dog: The Way of the Samurai, The Juror and Wall Street. In 2002, Adonis played the lead role of a bereaved Mafia gangster in the film High Times' Potluck. He directed the film One Deadly Road, and wrote for the 2007 film The Woods Have Eyes.

His television credits include The Equalizer (4 episodes), The Sopranos, Law & Order: Criminal Intent and New York Undercover. His last credit was in the 2017 film Proximity to Power.

== Death ==
Adonis died in December 2018, after a long battle from complications of kidney disease in Las Vegas, Nevada, at the age of 83.

== Filmography ==
=== Film ===
Year	Title	Role	Notes
1971	The French Connection	Bidder at New York Car Auction	Uncredited
1971	The Gang That Couldn't Shoot Straight	Palumbo Mafia Hood	Uncredited
1972	Shaft's Big Score!	Rip	Credited as Frank Scioscia
1973	Cops and Robbers	Picnic Hood	Credited as Frank Scioscia
1973	Lucky Luciano	Killer of Gene Giannini in New York	Uncredited
1974	Crazy Joe	Falco Family Soldier Gate Guard	Uncredited
1974	The Gambler	Man in Park with Donny	Credited as Frank Scioscia
1974	The Sister in Law	Benjo	Credited as Frank Scioscia
1976	Patty	The Sports Promoter	Credited as Frank Scioscia
1978	Eyes of Laura Mars	Sal Volpe	
1979	Punk Rock	Bartelli	Credited as Frank Martin
1980	Raging Bull	Patsy	
1981	Wolfen	Scola	
1987	One Way Out	Tough in the Warehouse	Credited as Frankie Adonis
1987	Wall Street	Charlie	
1988	Spike of Bensonhurst	Vinaca	
1990	King of New York	Paul Calgari	
1990	Goodfellas	Anthony Stabile	
1992	Bad Lieutenant	Large	
1993	True Romance	Frankie	
1994	Ace Ventura: Pet Detective	Vinnie	
1995	Finding Interest	The Godfather	
1995	Casino	Rocky	
1996	The Juror	DeCicco	
1998	Mob Queen	Maderiaga	
1999	Ghost Dog: The Way of the Samurai	Valerio's Bodyguard	
1999	Black & White	Frank	
2001	Mafioso: The Father, the Son	Luca Veneri	
2002	High Times' Potluck	Frank	
2006	Find Me Guilty	Phil Radda	
2006	Saddam	Joe DiBello	
2007	The Woods Have Eyes	Bubba	
2012	The Trouble with Cali	Uncle Vito	
2017	Proximity to Power		Final role

=== Television ===
Year	Title	Role	Notes
1985–1987	The Equalizer	Limo Driver	3 episodes "The Distant Fire" (S1.E8) "Back Home" (S1.E13) "Memories of Manon (Part 2)" (S2.E16)
1989	The Equalizer	Chauffeur	Episode: "Past Imperfect" (S4.E10)
1989	America's Most Wanted: America Fights Back	Fran Deciccio	Episode: "Paul Castellano"
1996	New York Undercover	Sonny Bruno	Episode: "Checkmate"
2000	The Sopranos	Guest #1	Episode: "House Arrest"
2004	Law & Order: Criminal Intent	Eddie	Episode: "Fico Di Capo"
