= Jason Miller (playwright) =

American actor and playwright (1939–2001)

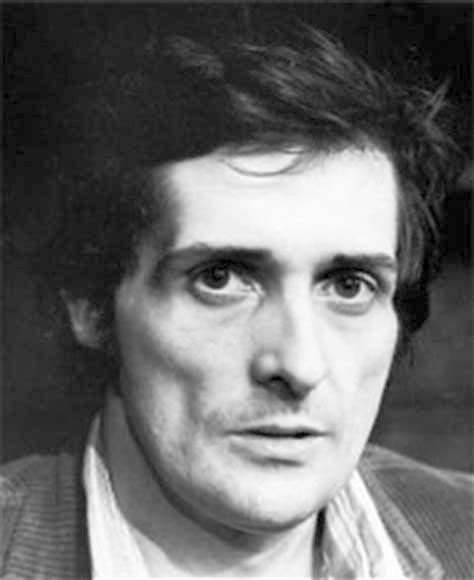
- Miller, c. 1972
- Born: John Anthony Miller Jr. April 22, 1939; New York City, U.S.
- Died: May 13, 2001 (aged 62); Scranton, Pennsylvania, U.S.
- Education: University of Scranton (BA); Catholic University (MA)
- Occupations: Playwright, actor
- Years active: 1972–2001
- Spouses: Linda Gleason (m. 1963; div. 1973) Susan Bernard (m. 1974; div. 1983) Ruth Josem (m. 1984; div. 1990)
- Children: 4, including Jason Patric and Joshua John Miller

John Anthony Miller Jr. (April 22, 1939 – May 13, 2001), better known by his stage name Jason Miller, was an American playwright and actor. He won the 1973 Pulitzer Prize for Drama and Tony Award for Best Play for his play That Championship Season, and was nominated for the Academy Award for Best Supporting Actor for his performance as Father Damien Karras in the 1973 horror film The Exorcist, a role he reprised in The Exorcist III (1990). He later became artistic director of the Scranton Public Theatre in Scranton, Pennsylvania, where That Championship Season was set.

== Early life ==
John Anthony Miller Jr. was born in Queens, New York City to Mary Claire (née Collins), a teacher, and John Anthony Miller Sr., an electrician. His ancestry was primarily Irish Catholic, with some German.

His family moved to Scranton in 1941, where Miller was educated at St. Patrick's High School and the Jesuit-run University of Scranton, where he received a degree in English and philosophy. He then attended the Catholic University of America in Washington, D.C., as a graduate student in the speech and drama department. Although the Associated Press reported upon his passing that he earned a master's degree there, Miller had claimed that he was asked to leave the school before taking a degree "for never attending classes, never taking tests and never getting the girls back to their dormitory by 10 o'clock." During this time, he taught drama and English at nearby Archbishop Carroll High School.

== Career ==
Miller attracted fame in 1972 by winning a Pulitzer Prize for his play, That Championship Season, which also won the 1973 Tony Award for Best Play. The original Broadway cast featured Charles Durning, Richard Dysart, and Paul Sorvino. That same year, he was offered the role of the troubled priest, Father Damien Karras, in William Friedkin's horror film The Exorcist (1973), for which he was nominated for an Academy Award for Best Supporting Actor. After his nomination for The Exorcist, he was offered the lead role in Taxi Driver (1976) but turned it down to do Robert Mulligan's The Nickel Ride.

In 1982, Miller directed the screen version of That Championship Season. Featured in the cast were Robert Mitchum (replacing William Holden, who died before filming began), Paul Sorvino, Martin Sheen, Stacy Keach, and Bruce Dern. His own film career was sporadic, as he preferred to work in regional theatre. He starred as Henry Drummond, opposite Malachy McCourt as Matthew Brady, in the Philadelphia production of Inherit The Wind.

Miller worked as artistic director with The Scranton Public Theatre. With SPT, he directed and starred in various productions including Blithe Spirit, Harvey, California Suite, Crimes of the Heart, and The Lion in Winter. He acted occasionally in feature films, including The Devil's Advocate (1977), The Dain Curse (1978), The Ninth Configuration (1980), Toy Soldiers (1984), The Exorcist III (1990) and Rudy (1993), playing Notre Dame football coach Ara Parseghian.

In 1998, he toured the country in his one-man play Barrymore's Ghost, ending the tour with a four-month run off-Broadway. In October 2000, he performed Barrymore's Ghost in a successful and critically acclaimed production directed by Michael Leland at Theatre Double main stage in Philadelphia. Miller's last project was a 2001 revival of The Odd Couple for the Pennsylvania Summer Theatre Festival, in which he was to appear in the role of Oscar Madison, but he died of a heart attack before the production opened.

== Personal life ==
Miller was the father of actors Jason Patric (by first wife Linda Gleason, daughter of Jackie Gleason) and Joshua John Miller (by second wife Susan Bernard).

As of 1972, he was a resident of Neponsit, Queens, New York. He moved to Upper Saddle River, New Jersey, in 1973.

In 1982, he returned to Scranton to become artistic director of the Scranton Public Theatre, a regional theatre company founded the year before.

== Death ==
On May 13, 2001, Miller died of a heart attack in his hometown of Scranton, Pennsylvania.

In 2004, actor Paul Sorvino, a longtime friend of Miller's and a cast member of all three versions of That Championship Season, was commissioned by Scranton to create a bronze bust of the late playwright and actor. The statue was unveiled in December 2008.

In March 2011, the first Broadway revival of That Championship Season opened. The cast comprised Brian Cox, Kiefer Sutherland, Jim Gaffigan, and Miller's elder son, actor Jason Patric. The urn containing Miller's ashes was placed on the set by Patric, who played the role Miller had based on himself.

== Filmography ==
Year	Title	Role	Notes
1973	The Exorcist	Father Damien Karras	Nominated — Academy Award for Best Supporting Actor
1974	The Nickel Ride	Cooper	
1975	A Home of Our Own	Father William Wasson	TV film
1976	F. Scott Fitzgerald in Hollywood	F. Scott Fitzgerald	TV film
1976	El Perro	Aristides Ungria	a.k.a. The Dog aka Vengeance (US home release title)
1977	The Devil's Advocate	Dr. Meyer	
1978	The Dain Curse	Owen Fitzstephan	Miniseries
1979	Vampire	John Rawlins	TV film
1980	The Ninth Configuration	Lt. Frankie Reno	a.k.a. Twinkle, Twinkle, Killer Kane
1980	The Henderson Monster	Dr. Tom Henderson	TV film
1980	Marilyn: The Untold Story	Arthur Miller	TV film
1981	The Best Little Girl in the World	Clay Orlovsky	TV film
1982	That Championship Season		Screenwriter / Director; Nominated – Golden Berlin Bear at the 33rd Berlin International Film Festival
1982	Monsignor	Don Vito Appolini	
1984	Toy Soldiers	Sarge	
1984	A Touch of Scandal	Garrett Locke	TV film
1984	Terror in the Aisles		Archival footage
1987	Light of Day	Benjamin Rasnick	
1987	Deadly Care	Dr. Miles Keefer	TV film
1990	The Exorcist III	Patient X (Father Damien Karras)	
1992	Small Kill	Mikie	
1993	Rudy	Ara Parseghian	
1995	Mommy	Lieutenant March	
1995	Murdered Innocence	Detective Rollins	
1998	Trance	The Doctor	a.k.a. The Eternal
1999	That Championship Season		TV film Screenwriter
2000	Slice		unproduced film
2002	Paradox Lake	camp director	filmed 1997–98; released posthumously
2003	Finding Home	Lester Bownlow	Released posthumously
2023	The Exorcist: Believer	Father Damien Karras	Archive footage

== Bibliography ==
- Nobody Hears a Broken Drum (1970)
- Lou Gehrig Did Not Die of Cancer (1971)
- That Championship Season (1972)
- Barrymore's Ghost (2000)
- Three One-Act Plays (1973, drama)
