= Renee Props =

American actress (born 1962)

- Born: Babette Renee Propps; February 15, 1962 (age 63); Cordell, Oklahoma, U.S.
- Occupation: Actress
- Years active: 1981–present

Renee Props (born February 15, 1962, in Cordell, Oklahoma) is an American actress. She is best known for the role of Ellie Snyder on the CBS daytime soap opera As the World Turns which she played for four years. She is also known to Seinfeld fans as Lois in the sixth-season episode "The Race", and for the role of "Nicki" in the film Get Shorty with Danny DeVito and John Travolta.

Her early break came with a starring role in the "Maigret en Arizona" episode of the French television series Les Enquêtes du Commissaire Maigret, and a couple of years later with John Hughes placing her in his 1985 film Weird Science.

Props has guest-starred on the TV shows Law & Order, Silver Spoons, Knight Rider, Hill Street Blues, The Facts of Life and others. She was a regular on one of the first series Showtime created, Hard Knocks, which also starred Bill Maher.
