= Allie & Me =

- Directed by: Michael Rymer
- Starring: Lyndie Benson
- Release date: 1997
- Running time: 85 minutes
- Country: United States
- Language: English

Allie & Me is a 1997 comedy film directed by Michael Rymer and starring Lyndie Benson. It won an award at the 1997 RiverRun International Film Festival.

== Cast ==
- Lyndie Benson as Michelle Halaburton
- Joanne Baron as Allie Dadadad
- James Wilder as Rodney Alexander
- Steven Chester Prince as Detective Simon Burke
- Ed Lauter as Detective Frank Richards
- Harry Hamlin as Dustin Halaburton
- Lainie Kazan as Camille Alexander
- Julianne Phillips as Angela Nansky
- Dyan Cannon as Christine Brown
- Briony Behets as Woman in Salon
