= That Championship Season =

1972 play

- Original language: English
- Written by: Jason Miller
- Characters: The Coach; George Sitkowski; Phil Romano; James Daley; Tom Daley
- Setting: The Coach's home in Scranton, Pennsylvania, 1972

Premiere
- Date: May 2, 1972
- Place: Estelle Newman Theatre, The Public Theater, New York City

That Championship Season is a 1972 play by Jason Miller. It was the recipient of the 1973 Pulitzer Prize for Drama and the 1973 Tony Award for Best Play.

== Plot synopsis ==
The setting is 1972 at the Coach's home in Scranton, Pennsylvania. On the 20th anniversary of their victory in the Pennsylvania state championship game, four members of the starting lineup of a Catholic high school basketball team have gathered to celebrate. This reunion may be their last chance to reminisce with each other due to their Coach's illness. The fifth member of the starting lineup, Martin (who made the game-winning shot), has refused to attend the reunion. He bears a grudge against the Coach for reasons that do not become clear until late in the play.

George Sitkowski has become Scranton's mayor, but he has proven inept and unpopular, and he is likely to lose his re-election bid. The fact that his challenger is Jewish is particularly irritating to him.

Phil Romano has become a millionaire in the strip mining business, using his close ties to Sitkowski to obtain mining permits. Though Romano helps George financially, he is carrying on an affair with George's wife.

James Daley is a local junior high school principal. His brother Tom is an unsuccessful, embittered, cynical alcoholic and good-for-nothing writer.

None of the men's lives have turned out as they had hoped. On some level, all still look to the Coach for guidance. The Coach has always been the embodiment of old-school Catholicism (Senator Joseph McCarthy and Father Charles Coughlin are heroes of his). He was also the one person in their lives who was sure of everything, and his absolute certainty and confidence gave them a sense of security. While the Coach thought he was teaching his players how to be men, they instead became emotional adolescents who still needed him to tell them how to live their lives. The Coach's pep talks, which had always inspired them, were beginning to sound hollow. Only now do they realize that the Coach was a bigot, a bully, and a fraud.

== Productions ==
=== Off-Broadway (1972) ===
The play made its off-Broadway debut at the Estelle Newman Theatre on May 2, 1972, where it ran for 144 performances, closing on September 3, 1972. It was directed by A.J. Antoon, and it won the Pulitzer Prize for Drama.

=== Broadway (1972–1974) ===
A transfer of the off-Broadway production opened on Broadway at the Booth Theatre, running for 700 performances, opening on September 14, 1972, and closing on April 21, 1974. This production won the 1973 New York Drama Critics' Circle, Drama Desk, and Tony Award for Best Play. The production starred Richard Dysart, Charles Durning, Paul Sorvino and Michael McGuire.

=== Off-Broadway revival (1999) ===
A short-lived off-Broadway revival played from April 21 to May 2, 1999, at the Second Stage Theatre. It was directed by Scott Ellis, with lighting by Kenneth Posner, and lasted for 14 performances.

=== Broadway revival (2011) ===
Gregory Mosher directed a revival of the play on Broadway at the Bernard B. Jacobs Theatre. Previews began on February 9, 2011, with a limited engagement from March 6 to May 29, 2011. It starred Brian Cox as Coach, Jim Gaffigan as George Sikowski, Chris Noth as Phil Romano, Jason Patric (Miller's son) as Tom Daley and Kiefer Sutherland as James Daley. Highlights of the production were released on February 25, 2011. The revival was met with an indifferent reception from critics.

== Reception ==
At the time of its premiere, That Championship Season was a critical success. Those who liked the play complimented its humor, dialogue, and characters. Reviewing the Broadway production, Clive Barnes of the New York Times wrote, "Mr. Miller has a perfect ear and instinct for the rough and tumble profanity of locker-room humor. The coarsely elegant gibes go along with Mr. Miller’s indictment of a society, which opens with an ironic playing of the National Anthem and then lacerates the sickness of small-town America full of bigotry, double-dealing, racism, and hate."

== Film adaptations ==
Miller wrote and directed the film adaptation of the play that was released in 1982. Robert Mitchum starred as the Coach. Bruce Dern, Stacy Keach, Martin Sheen, and Paul Sorvino completed the cast.

In 1999, Miller wrote another screenplay for television directed by Paul Sorvino, who also played the Coach. This version also starred Vincent D'Onofrio, Terry Kinney, Tony Shalhoub, and co-producer Gary Sinise.

== Awards and nominations ==
=== Original Broadway production ===
Year	Award	Category	Nominee	Result
1973	Tony Award	Best Play		Won
1973	Tony Award	Best Actor in a Play	Paul Sorvino	Nominated
1973	Tony Award	Best Direction of a Play	A. J. Antoon	Won
1973	Tony Award	Best Scenic Design	Santo Loquasto	Nominated
1973	Tony Award	Best Lighting Design	Ian Calderon	Nominated
1973	Pulitzer Prize	Drama	Jason Miller	Won
